= History of Lisbon =

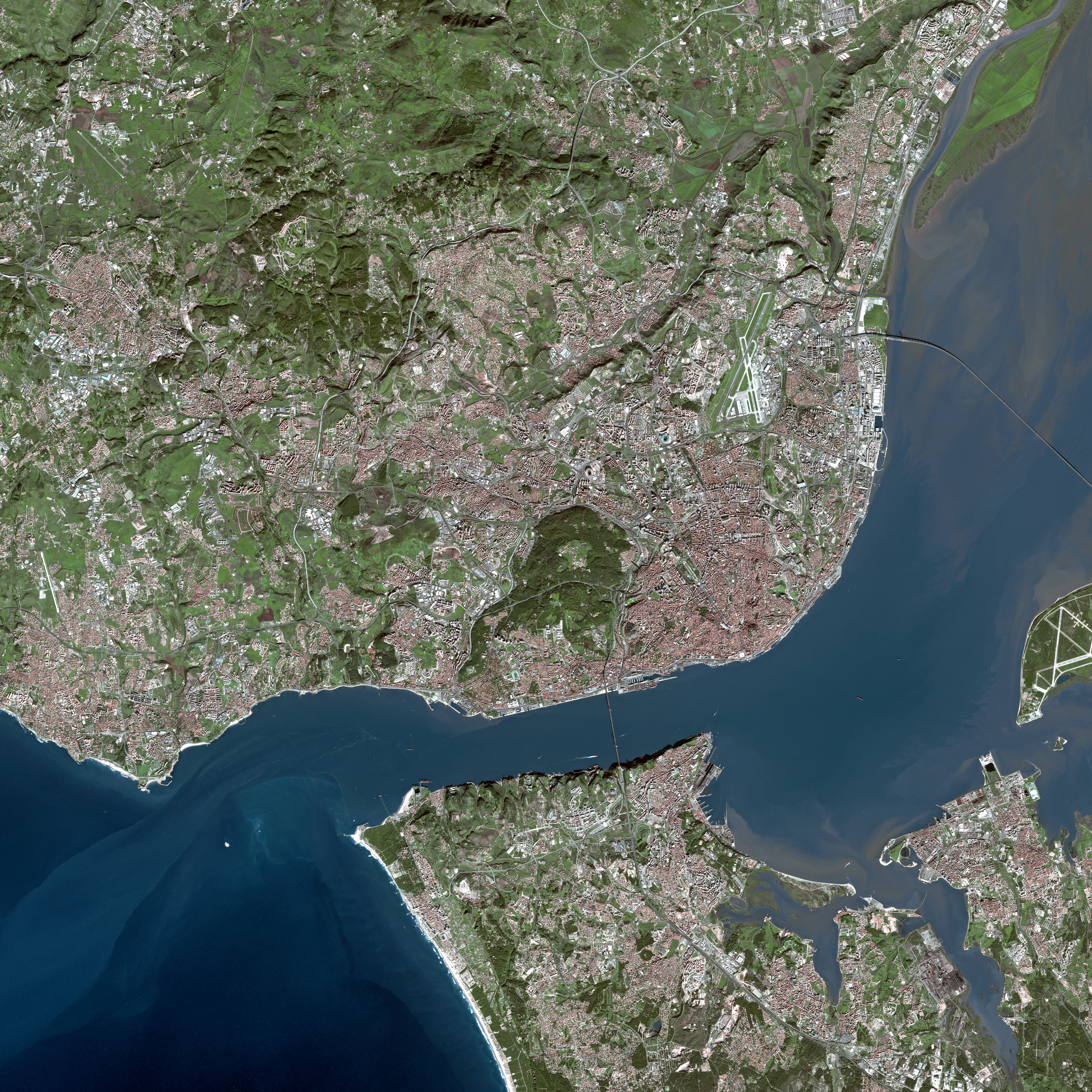
SPOT Satellite image of Lisbon on the north bank of the Mar da Palha (Sea of Straw), right. The Atlantic Ocean is to the left.

The history of Lisbon, the capital city of Portugal, revolves around its strategic geographical position at the mouth of the Tagus, the longest river in the Iberian Peninsula. Its spacious and sheltered natural harbour made the city historically an important seaport for trade between the Mediterranean Sea and northern Europe. Lisbon has long enjoyed the commercial advantages of its proximity to southern and extreme western Europe, as well as to sub-Saharan Africa and the Americas, and today its waterfront is lined with miles of docks, wharfs, and drydock facilities that accommodate the largest oil tankers.

During the Neolithic period, pre-Celtic peoples inhabited the region; remains of their stone monuments still exist today in the periphery of the city. Lisbon is one of the oldest cities in western Europe, with a history that stretches back to its original settlement by its indigenous peoples, and the eventual establishment of Phoenician and Greek trading posts (c. 800–600 BC), followed by successive occupations in the city of various peoples including the Carthaginians, Romans, Suebi, Visigoths, and Moors. Roman armies first entered the Iberian peninsula in 219 BC, and occupied the city of Olissipo (Lisbon) in 205 BC, after winning the Second Punic War against the Carthaginians. With the collapse of the Roman Empire, waves of Germanic tribes invaded the peninsula, and by 500 AD, the Visigothic Kingdom controlled most of Hispania.

In 711, Muslims, who were mostly Berbers and Arabs from the Maghreb, invaded the Christian Iberian Peninsula, conquering Lisbon in 714. What is now Portugal first became part of the Emirate of Córdoba and then of its successor state, the Caliphate of Córdoba. Despite attempts to seize it by the Normans in 844 and by Alfonso VI in 1093, Lisbon remained a Muslim possession. In 1147, after a four-month siege, Christian crusaders under the command of Afonso I captured the city and Christian rule returned. In 1256, Afonso III moved his capital from Coimbra to Lisbon, taking advantage of the city's excellent port and its strategic central position.

Lisbon flourished in the 15th and 16th centuries as the centre of a vast empire during the period of the Portuguese discoveries, This was a time of intensive maritime exploration, when the Kingdom of Portugal accumulated great wealth and power through its colonisation of Asia, South America, Africa and the Atlantic islands. Evidence of the city's wealth can still be seen today in the magnificent structures built then, including the Jerónimos Monastery and the nearby Tower of Belém, each classified a UNESCO World Heritage Site in 1983.

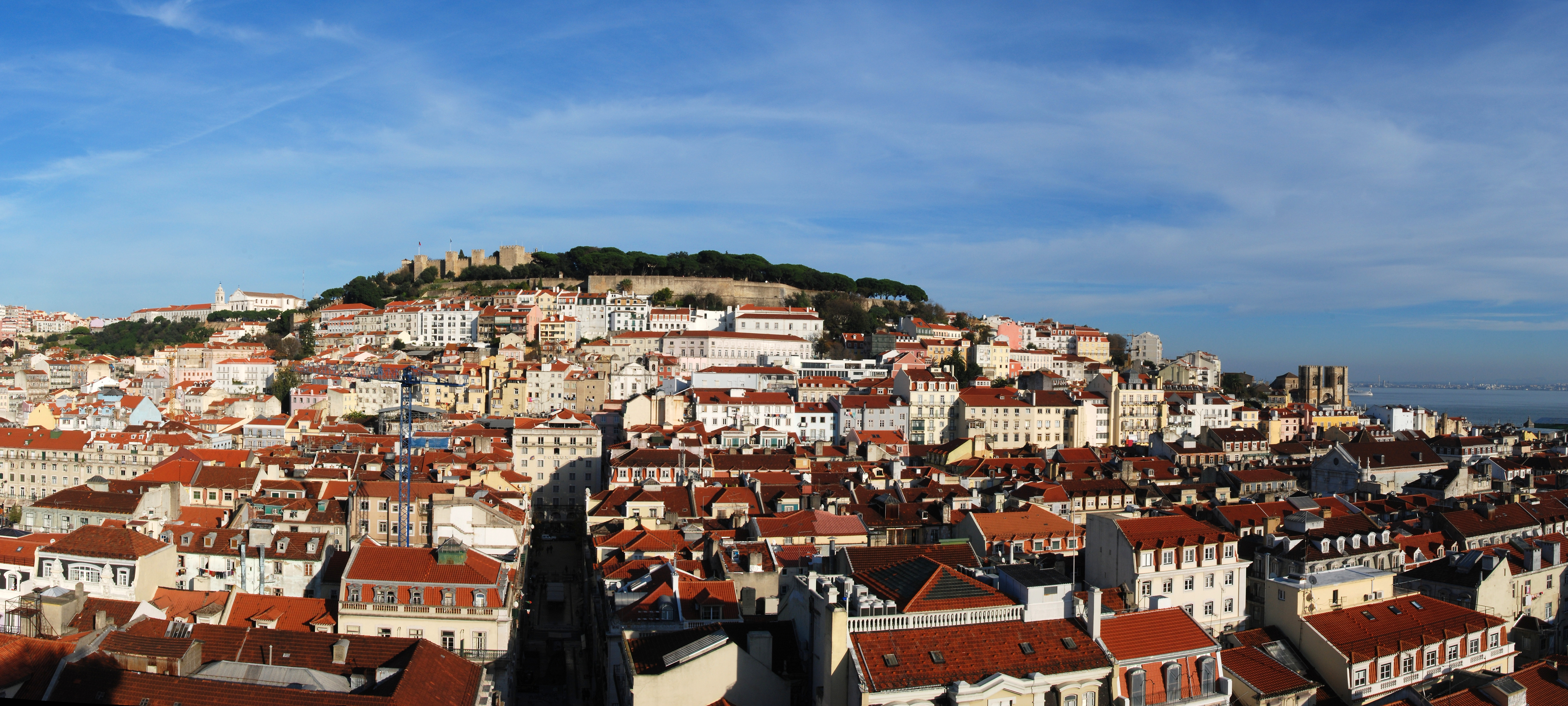
Panoramic view of Lisbon, showing the Castle hill and the Cathedral

The 1755 Lisbon earthquake, in combination with subsequent fires and a tsunami, almost totally destroyed Lisbon and adjoining areas. Sebastião José de Carvalho e Melo, 1st Marquis of Pombal, took the lead in ordering the rebuilding of the city, and was responsible for the creation of the elegant financial and commercial district of the Baixa Pombalina (Pombaline Lower Town).

During the Peninsular War, (1807–1814) Napoleon's forces began a four-year occupation of the city in December 1807, and Lisbon descended with the rest of the country into anarchy. After the war ended in 1814, a new constitution was proclaimed and Brazil was granted independence. The 20th century brought political upheaval to Lisbon and the nation as a whole. In 1908, at the height of the turbulent period of the Republican movement, King Carlos and his heir Luís Filipe was assassinated in the Terreiro do Paço. On 5 October 1910, the Republicans organised a coup d'état that overthrew the constitutional monarchy and established the Portuguese Republic. There were 45 changes of government from 1910 through 1926.

The right-wing Estado Novo regime, which ruled the country from 1926 to 1974, suppressed civil liberties and political freedom in the longest-lived dictatorship in Western Europe. It was finally deposed by the Carnation Revolution (Revolução dos Cravos), launched in Lisbon with a military coup on 25 April 1974. The movement was joined by a popular campaign of civil resistance, leading to the fall of the Estado Novo, the restoration of democracy, and the withdrawal of Portugal from its African colonies and East Timor. Following the revolution, there was a huge influx into Lisbon of refugees from the former African colonies in 1974 and 1975.

Portugal joined the European Community (EC) in 1986, and subsequently received massive funding to spur redevelopment. Lisbon's local infrastructure was improved with new investment and its container port became the largest on the Atlantic coast. The city was in the limelight as the 1994 European City of Culture, as well as host of Expo '98 and the 2004 European Football Championships. The year 2006 saw continuing urban renewal projects throughout the city, ranging from the restoration of the Praça de Touros (Lisbon's bullring) and its re-opening as a multi-event venue, to improvements of the metro system and building rehabilitation in the Alfama.

== Prehistory to the Neolithic period ==
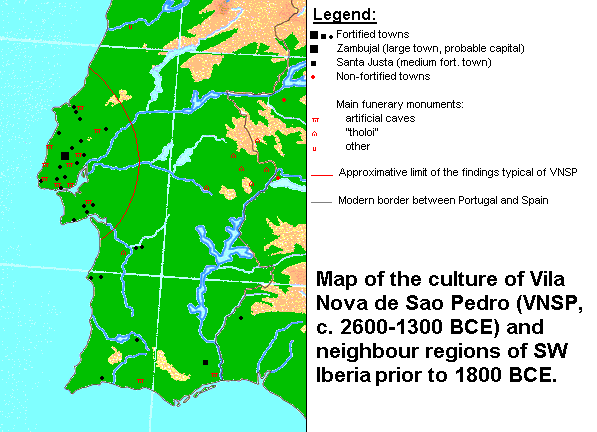
Lisbon area settlements prior to 1800 BC

There are traces of human occupation for many thousands of years in the area of what is now Lisbon. Its terrain was made attractive by the advantages of dwelling near the River Tagus and its estuary. The first human inhabitants were probably the Neanderthals, who gradually became extinct about 30,000 years ago when modern humans entered the Iberian Peninsula. During the Neolithic period, the region was inhabited by an unknown people who lived in farming communities near the coast. Some of the megalithic burial chambers in the region around Lisbon appear to have been built by Mesolithic pastoral-hunting peoples. They built religious monuments called megaliths, dolmens and menhirs that still survive in the periphery of the city. Permanent settlements are not shown in the archaeological record until c. 2500 BC.

== Antiquity ==
Writers in the Middle Ages such as theologian Isidore of Seville, and historian Lucas de Tuy, Bishop of Tuy, refer to ancient popular legends that the city of Lisbon was founded by the mythical hero Odysseus. The Estrímnios (in Portuguese) are given by some historians as the first known native people of Portugal. Called Oestrimni (Latin for "people of the far west") by the Romans, they extended their territory from present-day Galicia to the Algarve during the Late Bronze Age (1200–700 B.C.). These indigenous communities engaged in maritime and overland commerce, their fortified settlements dominating trade on the larger rivers and coastal estuaries of central southern Portugal.

The Indo-European Celts entered the Iberian peninsula in the first millennium BC and gradually spread west to the Atlantic, intermarrying with the native Pre-Indo-European population, and thus giving rise to Celtic-speaking local tribes such as the Cempsi and Sefes or Ophis ("People of the Serpents"). They colonised the fertile lands of Oestriminis and formed a territory known to the Greeks as Ophiussa (Land of Serpents), stretching from the Douro to the Tagus.

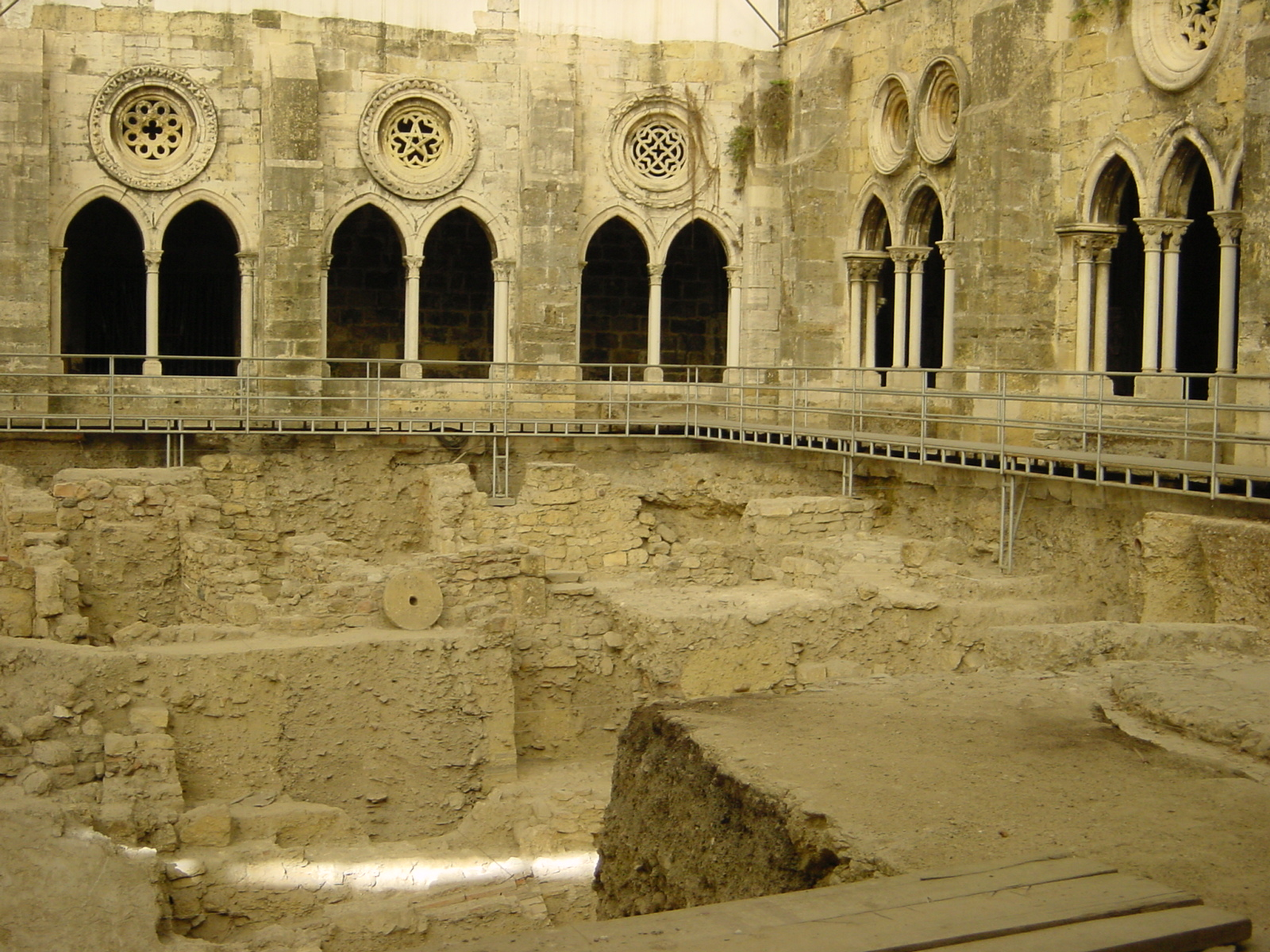
Phoenician archaeological dig in the Lisbon Cathedral cloisters

Although the first fortifications on Lisbon's Castelo hill are known to be no older than the 2nd century BC, recent archaeological finds have shown that Iron Age people occupied the site from the 8th to 6th centuries BC. This indigenous settlement maintained commercial relations with the Phoenicians, which would account for the recent findings of Phoenician pottery and other material objects. Archaeological excavations made near the Castle of São Jorge (Castelo de São Jorge) and Lisbon Cathedral indicate a Phoenician presence at this location since 1200 BC, and it can be stated with confidence that a Phoenician trading post stood on a site now the centre of the present city, on the southern slope of the Castle hill.

The Phoenicians are known to have traded with the resident Oestrimni and related tribes. The harbour of the Mar da Palha (Sea of Straw), a large basin in the estuary of the River Tagus near the river's mouth, is the best natural port on the Atlantic coast of Portugal, stretching 23 km at its widest point. This would have made it an ideal location for a settlement to unload and reprovision Phoenician ships sailing on trade voyages. Legend tells that they sailed to Cornwall in Britain and the legendary Tin Islands, or Cassiterides, to buy tin from the natives, but this is unsubstantiated.

Iberia before Carthaginian conquests, c. 300 BC

The Phoenicians established a trading post at the site, supposedly called Alis Ubbo, meaning "Pleasant Haven" or "Safe Harbour" in the Phoenician language. It may have been an outpost of the Tyrian colony at Gadir (Cádiz). The indigenous settlement extended from the highest hill in the vicinity, where the Castle and Cathedral now stand, to the Tagus.

For centuries, the Phoenicians had cultivated relationships with the indigenous peoples on the Atlantic coast of Iberia. From what was a simple outpost for trade with northern Europe, the Tagus settlement became an important centre of commercial trade where they exchanged their manufactured products for valuable metals, salted fish and salt with the inland tribes of the region accessible by the Tagus. Although Phoenician remains from the 8th century BC have been found beneath the medieval Sé de Lisboa (Lisbon Cathedral), most modern historians believe that Lisbon was founded as an ancient indigenous settlement that maintained commercial relations with the Phoenicians (accounting for the discovery of Phoenician pottery and artefacts at the site). It is possible that the Phocaean Greeks at one time also had a trading station at the mouth of the Tagus, but were eventually driven out as the Phoenician colony of Carthage increasingly dominated maritime commerce in the western Mediterranean and expanded its naval power, with control of localised mercantile relations with Olissipo passing to that city.

A multitude of Lusitanian deities, including Aracus, Carneus, and Bandiarbariaicus were worshiped at the city by the original inhabitants of the Turduli settlement.

=== Olisipo: Roman Lisbon ===
Roman conquest of Hispania

The suffix "-ippo" (-ipo), present in "Olissipo" (the Roman name of Lisbon), is typical of Tartessian or Turdetani linguistic influence. Lisbon's name was written Ulyssippo in Latin by the geographer Pomponius Mela, a native of Hispania. It was referred to as "Olisippo" by Pliny the Elder and by the Greeks as Olissipo (Ὀλισσιπών) and Olissipona (Ὀλισσιπόνα). According to local legend, the location was named for the mythical Ulysses, who founded the settlement. Later, the Greek name appeared in Vulgar Latin in the form Olissipona, mentioned in the Etymologies of Saint Isidore of Seville.

Recent archaeological finds show that Lisbon grew around a pre-Roman settlement on the hill of the Castelo de São Jorge, as its ancient name, Olissipo, indicates. During the Second Punic War, Mago, the younger brother of Hannibal, was stationed with his troops among the Cynetes, or Conii, in the Algarve, while Hasdrubal Gisco was encamped at the mouth of the Tagus on the Atlantic coast. After the defeat of Hannibal at the Battle of Zama in 202 BC, Rome decided to deprive Carthage of its most valuable possession, Hispania (the name given by the Romans to the whole of the Iberian Peninsula). With the decisive victory of Scipio at the Battle of Ilipa in Spain in 206 BC, the Carthaginian hold in Iberia was broken.

Following the defeat of the Carthaginians in eastern Hispania, the pacification of the West was led by Consul Decimus Junius Brutus Callaicus. Brutus obtained the alliance of Olissipo by integrating it into the Empire in 138 BC. when the Romans sought to conquer the Lusitanians and other peoples of the northwest Iberian Peninsula. He also fortified the city, building defensive city walls against Lusitanian raids and rebellions. The townspeople fought beside the Roman legions against the Celtic tribes; in return the city became a Municipium Cives Romanorum and was given the name Olisipo Felicitas Julia by either Julius Caesar or Octavian. Local authorities were granted self-rule over a territory that extended 50 kilometres (31 mi), and was integrated within the Roman province of Lusitania, whose capital was Emerita Augusta. The city was granted the Latin Rights (ius Latii), giving its citizens the privileges of Roman citizenship and exempting them from paying taxes. The city population was around 30,000 at the time. Among the majority of Latin speakers lived a large minority of Greek traders and slaves.

Earthquakes were documented in 60 BC, several from 47 to 44 BC, several in 33 AD and a strong quake in 382 AD, but the exact amount of damage to the city is unknown. The town was located between the Castle Hill and the Baixa, but most riparian areas were at the time still submerged by the Tagus. Olissipo in Roman times was an important commercial centre, providing a link between the northern countries and the Mediterranean Sea. Its main products were garum, a fish sauce considered a luxury, salt and the Lusitanian horses renowned in antiquity.

=== Invasions and the Germanic tribes ===
Visigothic Kingdom

After the disintegration of the Roman empire and the subsequent feudalisation of society, the first waves of invaders, including Alans, Germanic tribes, Huns, and others, swept into the peninsula. Initially accepted as settlers in lands depopulated by the terrible epidemics (probably measles and smallpox) that killed much of the population, their incursions soon gave way to military expeditions with the sole object of plunder and conquest.

In the early 5th century the Vandals took Olissipo, followed by the Alans. In 419 Olissipo was plundered and burnt by the Visigothic king Walia, who founded the Visigothic kingdom in Spain. Remismund conquered Lisbon in 468 with the help of a Hispano-Roman called Lusidius, and finally in 469 it was integrated into the Suevi kingdom whose capital city was Braga. After the invasion, the Visigoths set up their court in Toledo and following several wars during the 6th century, conquered the Suevi, thus unifying the Iberian Peninsula, including the city they called Ulixbona. During this tumultuous time, Lisbon lost its political links with Constantinople, but not its commercial connections. Merchant Greeks, Syrians, Jews, and others from the East formed communities that exchanged local products with the Byzantine Empire, Asia and India.

== Middle Ages ==
=== Al-Us̲h̲būna: Muslim Lisbon ===
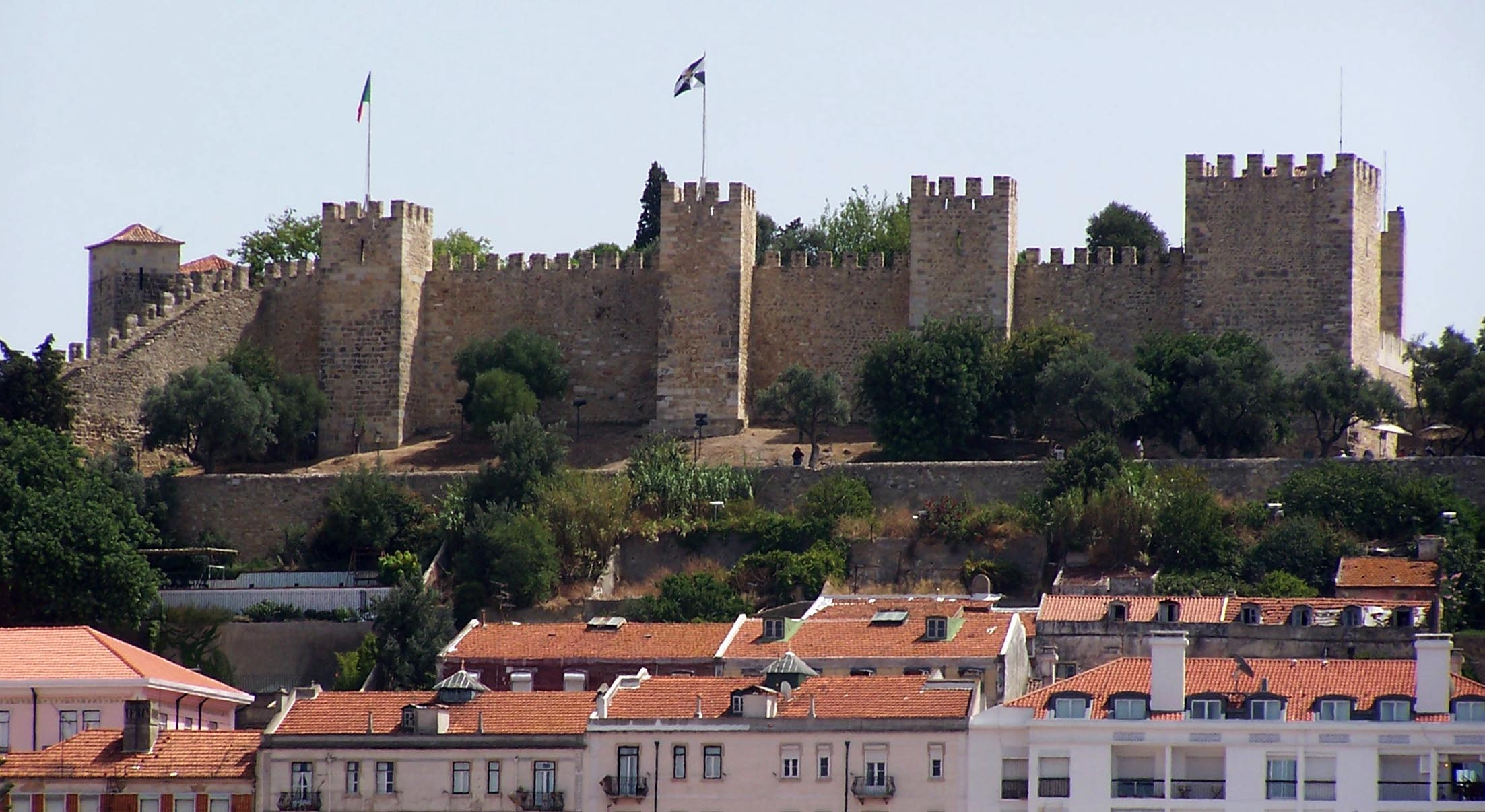
The visible profile of the Castle of São Jorge overlooking the historical centre of Lisbon

After three centuries of looting by invaders and the devastation of its economy, Ulixbona was reduced to little more than a village by the beginning of the 8th century. In 711, taking advantage of a civil war in the Visigothic Kingdom, the Arabs, led by Tariq ibn Ziyad, invaded the Iberian Peninsula with their Moorish troops. Ulixbona, like the rest of the western peninsula, was conquered by the troops of Abdelaziz ibn Musa, a son of Tariq, who took the city in 714.

Lisbon, known to the Arabs as "al-Us̲h̲būna" or al-ʾIšbūnah الأشبونة, again became a major commercial and administrative centre for the territory along the Tagus, collecting its raw products and exchanging them for goods from the Arabic Mediterranean, particularly Morocco, Tunisia, Egypt, Syria and Iraq. According to contemporary accounts, the city was one of the largest cities in Europe at the time, several times larger than Paris and London, which then had only 5,000–10,000 inhabitants each.

Most of the Hispano-Roman inhabitants adopted the Arabic language of the Muslim invaders, who, although a minority among the population, had become the new elite. The members of the Mozarabic Christian population had their own bishop, and were speakers of Arabic, or a variety of Vulgar Latin. Speaking the Mozarabic language, a Romance language similar to that spoken in Galicia and the northern provinces, was tolerated by the Muslim authorities as one of the rights of residence allowed the dhimmi, in exchange for their paying a tax, the jizyah. This Mozarabic community, which followed the heretical Arian Christian rites and customs of the Visigoths, was usually ostracised by Roman Catholics.

The Jewish community, which had existed since the city's earliest days, grew more influential as Jews established themselves as merchants and gained the financial advantage of living in the city's rising commercial hub. Besides salt, fish and horses, they traded spices from the Levant, medicinal herbs, dried fruit, honey and furs. The Saqaliba (Arabic:Saqāliba), slaves from Eastern Europe who served as mercenaries, joined the population and also acquired a prominent position in society. The Slavic slave Sabur al-Saqlabi ((Sabur the Slav)) became, during what was later known as the régulo eslavo, ruler of the Taifa of Badajoz. He was the son of Sabur al-Jatib, a Slav who had been in the service of al-Hakam II. His sons Abd al-Aziz ibn Sabur and Abd al-Malik ibn Sabur ruled successively as emirs of the Taifa of Lisbon.

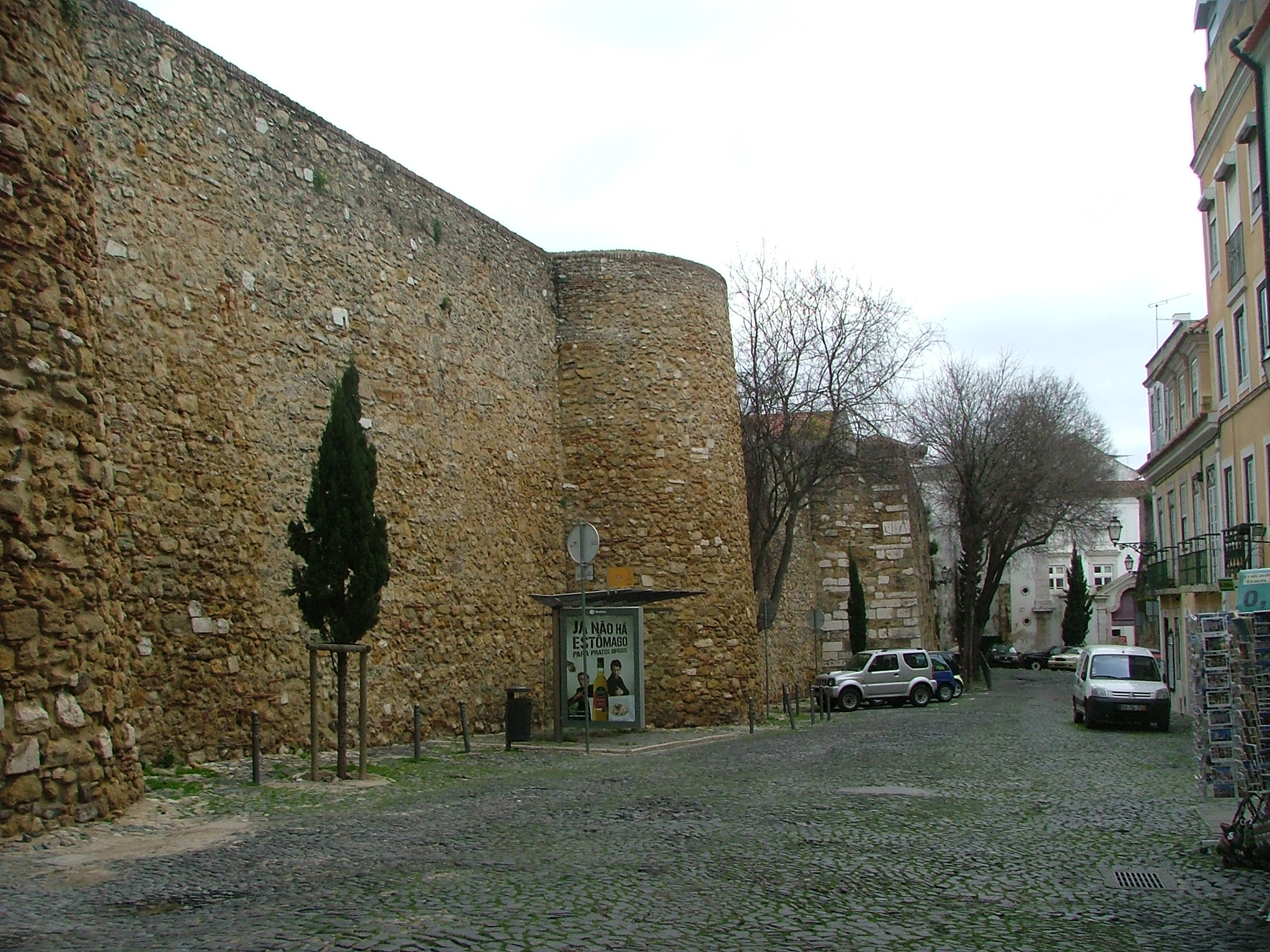
Moorish walls, part of the Cerca Moura surrounding the city

Al-Us̲h̲būna was renovated and rebuilt in the customary pattern of the Middle Eastern city: high walls (muralhas) surrounding the main buildings, which were a large mosque, a castle at the top of the hill (which in modified form became the Castelo de São Jorge), a medina or urban centre, and an alcácer, or fortress-palace for the governor. The Alfama neighbourhood grew next to the original urban core. The citadel of al-Madan, now the city of Almada, was built on the south bank of the Tagus to protect the port.

The Arabs and Berbers introduced new methods of irrigated agriculture that were much more productive than the old Roman system of irrigation. The waters of the Tagus and its tributaries were used to irrigate the land in summer, producing several crops a year of vegetables including lettuce and annual crops of oranges.

Lisbon became part of the Umayyad Caliphate based in Damascus, Syria, soon after the beginning of Muslim rule in Iberia. An ongoing rebellion (740–743) of the Berber or "Moorish" elite against the Umayyads had spread through the Maghreb (North Africa) and across the Strait of Gibraltar to al-Andalus, but needed reinforcements to defeat the caliphate. When the Umayyad dynasty was finally toppled by the Abbasid Revolution in 750, Abd al-Rahman I, an Umayyad prince, fled with his family from the capital in Damascus across North Africa to al-Andalus, and gained independence from the new Abbasid Caliphate. There he established the Umayyad Emirate of Córdoba and Lisbon came under its dominion.

With the beginning of the Reconquista, the opulent al-Us̲h̲būna became a target of raids by the Christians, who plundered the city first in 796 and on other occasions in the following years, led by King Alfonso II of Asturias, but the border between Muslim and Christian Iberia remained north of the Douro. In 844 several dozen Viking boats sailed into the Sea of Straw. After a siege of 13 days, the Scandinavians conquered the city and the surrounding territory, but eventually retreated in the face of continued resistance by the townspeople led by their governor, Wahb Allah ibn Hazm.

At the beginning of the 10th century, various Islamic sects rose in al-Us̲h̲būna and converted the Hispano-Roman population. These sects were a form of political organization in revolt against the hierarchical system of the Muslim conquerors which institutionalised obstacles to their social mobility. The elite descendants of Muhammad ranked first, then full-blooded Arabs, then Berbers or Moors, and lastly the Arabised Muslims and Hispano-Romans. Several Hispano-Roman leaders emerged, including Ali ibn Ashra and others, who claimed to be prophets or descendants of `Alī ibn Abī Ṭālib, regarded by Shias as the first Imam. With their allies in other cities they started civil wars against the Sunni Arab troops. The Mozarabs and the Jews were treated even worse, sometimes suffering outright persecution.

The king of Asturias, Ordonho I, took the city in 851, as did Alfonso VI of León in 1093 when al-Mutawakkil of Badajoz surrendered al-Us̲h̲būna, S̲h̲antarīn (Santarém), and S̲h̲intra (Sintra) to Alfonso in 1093, but it was soon retaken by the Amoravids in 1094. An unsuccessful new attack by the Vikings followed in 966.

With the fragmentation of the Caliphate of Córdoba around the year 1000 as a result of political infighting, the notable leaders of al-Us̲h̲būna oscillated between obedience to the Taifa of Badajoz or to that of Ishbiliya (Seville), and were able to manoeuvre politically to obtain considerable autonomy. This situation lasted a short time until the return of the division of the Taifa brought autonomy and prosperity for al-Us̲h̲būna. In 1111 a new pan-Hispanic Caliphate was established after an Almoravid invasion from the deserts of Morocco led by the caliph Ali ibn Yusuf. His general, Zir ibn Abi Bakr, Yusuf's nephew, forced Lisbon to surrender in 1111 after several unsuccessful attempts, and was later stopped in the region of Tomar by Gualdim Pais, Grand Master of the Order of Knights Templar of Portugal. This new caliphate did not last long, and soon the times of divided taifas and a powerful al-Us̲h̲būna had returned.

=== Conquest of al-Us̲h̲būna ===
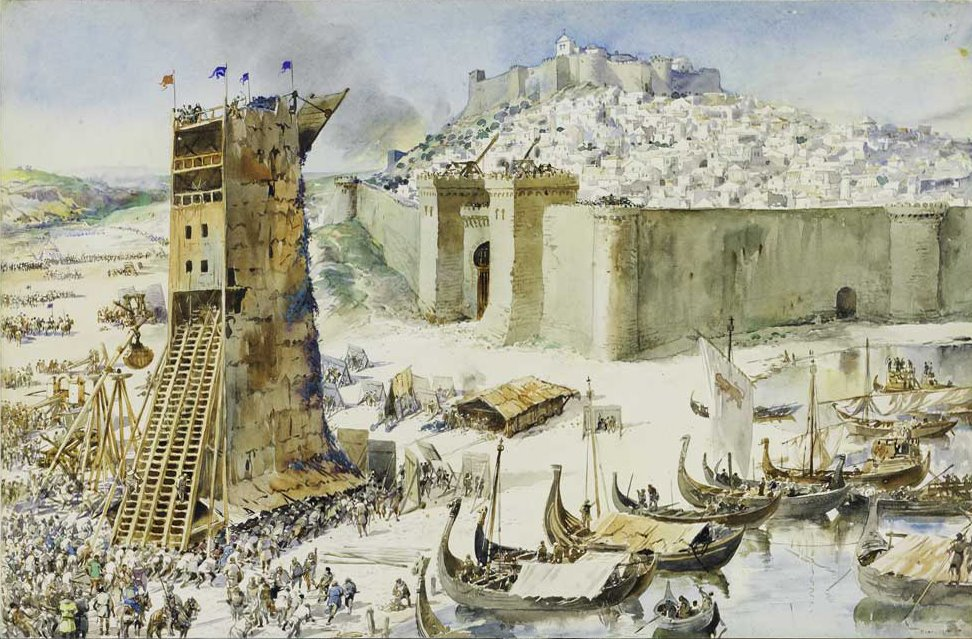
The Siege of Lisbon in 1147, part of the Reconquista (painted in 1917)

Internal dissensions eventually divided the loyalties of the kingdoms in al-Andalus of the 11th century; the collapse of the Caliphate of Córdoba in 1031 led to a period of smaller successor states (taifas), while the Kingdom of León lying directly to the north was ceded the county of Portugal. The history of the county is traditionally dated from the reconquest in 868 by Vímara Peres of the city of Portucale (Porto), which was the port of Cale, the present Gaia. Although the county had its seat at Guimarães, the economic strength that enabled its autonomy was based in Portucale. The isolated Atlantic province, recently centred in Coimbra, separated from the Kingdom of León to become the independent Kingdom of Portugal in 1139. It was eventually attached to Lisbon, thus integrating the territories adjoining the entire length of the Tagus.

Famed for its opulence, al-Us̲h̲būna's capture would bring the kingdom great prestige. Afonso I and his Christian forces first attempted to conquer the city in 1137 but failed to breach the city walls. In 1140 crusaders passing through Portugal launched another unsuccessful attack. According to the Anglo-Norman chronicler, in June and July 1147 a more numerous force of crusaders, consisting of 164 boatloads of English, Norman, and Rhenish crusaders, left from Dartmouth in England bound for the Holy Land. Bad weather forced the ships to stop on the Portuguese coast at Porto where they were persuaded to join in a new assault on the city. While the Portuguese forces attacked by land, the crusaders, lured by promises of booty to be taken and prisoners to be ransomed, set up their siege engines, among them catapults and towers, and attacked both by sea and land, preventing the arrival of reinforcements from the south. In their first encounters the Muslims killed many Christians; this affected the Crusader's morale, and occasioned several bloody conflicts between the various Christian contingents.

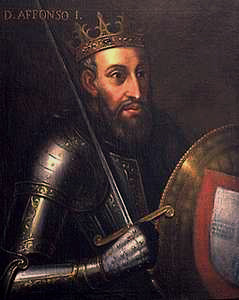
Portrait of King Afonso I of Portugal

Legend has it that after many previous attempts, the Portuguese knight Martim Moniz led an attack on the castle doors and when he saw the Moors closing them, blocked the doorway with his own body, allowing his companions to enter, and was crushed. With the success of the crusaders' assault on the city's walls with siege engines, the Moors capitulated on 22 October. According to an account by the priest Raol addressed to Osbert of Bawdsley (Osbernus), Germans from Cologne and the Flemish cohort violated their oaths to the king of Portugal after entering the city and plundered it. These crusaders behaved in a wanton manner, looting Muslims and Mozarabs indiscriminately, debauching virgins and even cutting the throat of the elderly Mozarab bishop. Afterwards, an epidemic of the plague killed thousands among the Mozarabic and the Muslim populations.

Afonso I officially took possession of the city on 1 November, when the Great Mosque in the Moorish Aljama was dedicated to St. Mary in a religious ceremony converting it to a Cathedral. He appointed Gilberto of Hastings, an English crusader, the first Catholic bishop of the city, and granted lands and titles to many of the most prominent crusaders in the region.

=== Medieval Christian Lisbon ===
After conquering the city, Afonso I received information that the relics of Saint Vincent of Saragossa were buried in the Algarve. He made his way southward to reclaim the martyr's remains. but when he arrived at the village it had been totally destroyed and there was no sign of the burial site. A flock of crows was seen flying over the place when the remains were finally found in 1176, and according to legend, two crows accompanied the boat that was carrying them all the way to Lisbon. In commemoration of this story, the crow was chosen to adorn the city's coat of arms as a symbol of its faithful guardians; but the fearless birds are no longer found in the area.

Three years later, in 1150, Afonso I built a cathedral on the site of the Great Mosque, now the Sé. The original Christian edifice built on the site had been converted into a mosque by the Moors, but when Afonso took the city, the building was already decrepit. He had the structure rebuilt and enlarged under the name of the first cathedral of Lisbon, Santa María, and all the privileges of Mérida, the ancient ecclesiastical capital of the former Roman province of Lusitania, passed to the new diocese.

Lisbon Cathedral is the seat of the Patriarch of Lisbon

Afonso I granted Lisbon a Foral in 1179, and tried to restore the city's commercial connections by inaugurating a major new fair or market. Consequently, the Portuguese merchants, Christian and Jewish, not only reestablished some of the old trade links of al-Us̲h̲būna with Seville and Cádiz, and in the Mediterranean with Constantinople, but also opened up new trade routes to the ports of northern Europe that the Muslims rarely visited because of religious differences. Lisbon became a conduit for maritime trade between the North Sea and the Mediterranean, and thanks to advances in navigation, the volume of ocean shipping increased. Portuguese merchants opened trade houses in Seville, Southampton, Bruges, and in the cities of the Hansa, which later joined to form the Hanseatic League. Meanwhile, the Portuguese Jews continued to trade with their relatives in North Africa. They exchanged Portuguese olive oil, salt, wine, cork, honey and wax as well as wool and fine linen textiles, tin, iron, dyes, amber, guns, furs and artisanal works of the north for the spices, silks and herbal remedies of the Mediterranean countries, in addition to the gold, ivory, rice, alum, almonds and sugar bought from the Arabs and Moors. Shipyards were founded to build more commercial and military vessels for the naval fleet (armada) essential to protect this trade from Saracen pirates. Increasing demand for goods by the growing populations of Europe in the 12th and 13th centuries stimulated innovations in the construction of boats, the sturdy but clumsy barge (barca) becoming obsolete when a gradual synthesis of Christian, Viking and Arabic sea-going knowledge led to the development of the caravel (first mentioned in the early 13th century), the first truly seaworthy Atlantic sailing ship. Professions in the maritime industry, such as those of ships-carpenters and sailors, were allowed certain privileges and protections, including the creation in 1242 of a maritime judicial office in Lisbon called the Alcaide do Mar (Alcaide of the Sea).

An indirect effect of this economic dynamism was that Lisbon's trade contributed to the ruin of the south German merchants, who engaged in the same commerce by using a more costly land route between the ports of Italy and those of the Netherlands and the Hansa that was only viable when Muslim pirates and their ships controlled southern Spain and the Strait of Gibraltar. As the Holy Roman Empire lost influence over its kingdoms, duchies and city-state constituents, the German merchants, hitherto the masters of European trade, were forced to seek new markets in the East.

With the new prosperity and increased security of Lisbon after the final conquest of the al-Gharb or al-Garve (Arabic: al-Gharb, "the west"), in 1256 Afonso III took note of its obvious advantages and chose the largest and most powerful city in the kingdom for his capital, moving his court, the national archives and the treasury from Coimbra to Lisbon. Denis, the first Portuguese king to rule at Lisbon during all his reign, created the university in 1290, which was transferred to Coimbra in 1308 because of increasing conflicts between the students and Lisbon residents. At this time the area where the Praça do Comércio (Commerce Square) is today was reclaimed from the sea by draining the already muddy terrain (the river flowed freely until the time of the conquest, but had become clogged due to sediment deposits). New streets were laid out, such as Rua Nova, while the Rossio square became the city centre, stealing that distinction from the Castle hill. Other construction projects initiated by King Denis included a wall to protect the Cais da Ribeira from pirate raids, and reconstruction of the Alcáçova or Moorish Palace (later destroyed in the 1755 earthquake) and the Sé.

Just as there were Portuguese communities in the cities of northern Europe, there were colonies of merchants from the rest of Europe in Lisbon, then one of the most important cities in international trade. Not counting the Jewish population (already established as a Portuguese minority), the Genoese were the most numerous expatriate community, followed by those of the Venetians and other Italians, and the Dutch and English. These merchants brought new cartographic and navigational techniques to Portugal, as well as an understanding of financial and banking practices and of the mercantilism system, not to mention the knowledge gained through their contacts with Byzantine and Muslim middlemen of the origins of imported Asian luxury goods such as silks and spices.

Political tensions with Castile were counterbalanced by an alliance made in 1308 by King Denis between Portugal and England, the main trading partner of Lisbon (and also of Porto), which has continued uninterruptedly until the present. This alliance later fought on one of the two sides of the so-called Caroline War; the second phase of the Hundred Years' War, on the other were Castile and France. During Ferdinand's reign, Portugal started a war with Castile, and Lisbon boats armed with cannons were recruited to participate in an unsuccessful Genoese attack on Seville. In response to this provocation, the Spaniards laid siege to Lisbon, taking it in 1373, but departed when they were paid a ransom. It was following this calamity that the Great Fernandine Walls (Grandes Muralhas Fernandinas de Lisboa) of Lisbon were built.

On the lower end of the social scale in Lisbon were all types of labourers and street merchants, as well as fishermen and farmers of vegetable gardens. In this era the streets were occupied by tradesmen who had organised artisans' guilds directed by masters of their respective trades. These included: Rua do Ouro (Goldsmiths' Street), Rua da Prata (Silversmiths' Street), Rua dos Fanqueiros (Drapers' Street), Rua dos Sapateiros (Cobblers' Street), Rua dos Retroseiros (Mercers' Street) and Rua dos Correeiros (Saddlers' Street). Such corporations were formed for social protection and to educate apprentices, and were employed to enforce a system of price controls for the benefit of their members. The aristocracy, attracted to Lisbon by the court, established its presence in the city with the building of large palaces, and served in the bureaucratic offices of governmental administration. But the most powerful segment of society in Lisbon, even after the city gained its status as the nation's capital, was the bourgeoisie, the merchant class that was the economic powerhouse of this rising commercial centre, now among the most important in Europe. They were the magnates of commerce who controlled the city and its oligarchic council. It was to serve their needs that business professionals organised in the city: bankers to raise capital and coordinate the financial risks; lawyers to protect the rights of citizens and handle their legal cases; naval architects and marine engineers to build boats, and scientists to design their navigational instruments. With their political influence, they could extract from the monarchy concessions that favored their mercantile interests, and were a great impetus for exploration to find new markets. A mutual benefit association, the Companhia das Naus, was founded in 1380 as a kind of insurance company which required the payment of compulsory quotas from all ship owners in exchange for the sharing of losses after shipwrecks. As an umbrella organisation covering more than five hundred large vessels owned by the magnates of the city, it was the forerunner of Portuguese overseas expansion. With rising profits, the wealthiest merchants acquired titles of nobility, even as the poorer nobles engaged in trade.

Minorities in the city included Sephardic Jews and Muslims (not only the Moors but also Arabs and Islamised Arabic-speaking Latinos). There was a large Jewish quarter occupying the parishes of St. Mary Magdalene, St. Julian and St. Nicholas along the Rua Nova dos Mercadores, where the Great Synagogue was located. The Jews (perhaps 10% of the population, or even more) were great traders, who took full advantage of connections to their coreligionists throughout Europe, North Africa and the Middle East. Those who did not engage in trade were largely scholars or professionals such as doctors, lawyers, cartographers and other specialists in the sciences or arts. The Jewish community's business activities were fundamental to the vitality of the city's economy. The Jews of Lisbon included such distinguished families as the Abravanels, descendants of Samuel Abravanel, a converso who had served as royal treasurer in Andalusia and comptroller in Castile. He apparently fled to Portugal with his family where they reverted to Judaism and later served in high governmental positions. No matter how eminent a social position individual Jews of Lisbon might attain, however, they were always the first victims of popular revolts. Their living quarters were segregated from those of the rest of the population and they were forbidden to go out at night; as well as being forced to wear distinctive clothes and to pay extra taxes.

The Moorish quarter was the corresponding ghetto for Muslims, containing the Great Mosque situated on the Rua do Capelão (Chaplains Street). However, they were not as prosperous nor as educated as the Jews, since the Muslim elites had fled to North Africa, while the Jews, who were literate speakers of Portuguese, had no other homeland. Most Muslims were workers in low-skilled, low-wage jobs and many were slaves of Christians. They had to display identifying symbols on their robes and pay extra taxes, and suffered the violence of the crowds. The deprecatory term saloio (countryman) came from a special levy, the salaio, that the Muslims who cultivated gardens within the city limits had to pay. Likewise, the term alfacinha (little head of lettuce) came from the cultivation by the Moors of lettuce plants, then little consumed in the north.

The city's prosperity was interrupted in 1290 by the first major earthquake in its recorded history, with many buildings collapsing and thousands of people dying. Earthquakes were recorded in 1318, 1321, 1334, and 1337; the temblor of 1344 leveled part of the Cathedral and the Moorish palace, or Alcáçova, and later quakes occurred in 1346, 1356 (destroying another portion of the cathedral), 1366, 1395 and 1404, all probably resulting from displacements in the same geological fault. Famine in 1333 and the first appearance of the Black Death in 1348 killed half the population; new outbreaks of lower mortality occurred in each succeeding decade. The aftermath of these disasters, in Lisbon as well as in the rest of Europe, led to a series of religious, social, and economic upheavals, destroying the vibrant European civilization of the Middle Ages and the spirit of universal Christianity symbolised by the soaring Gothic architecture of its cathedrals. Yet it also paved the way for the emergence of a new civilization with the coming of the age of discovery and the rise of a revitalised spirit of scientific inquiry.

=== Revolution: the 1383–1385 crisis and its aftermath ===
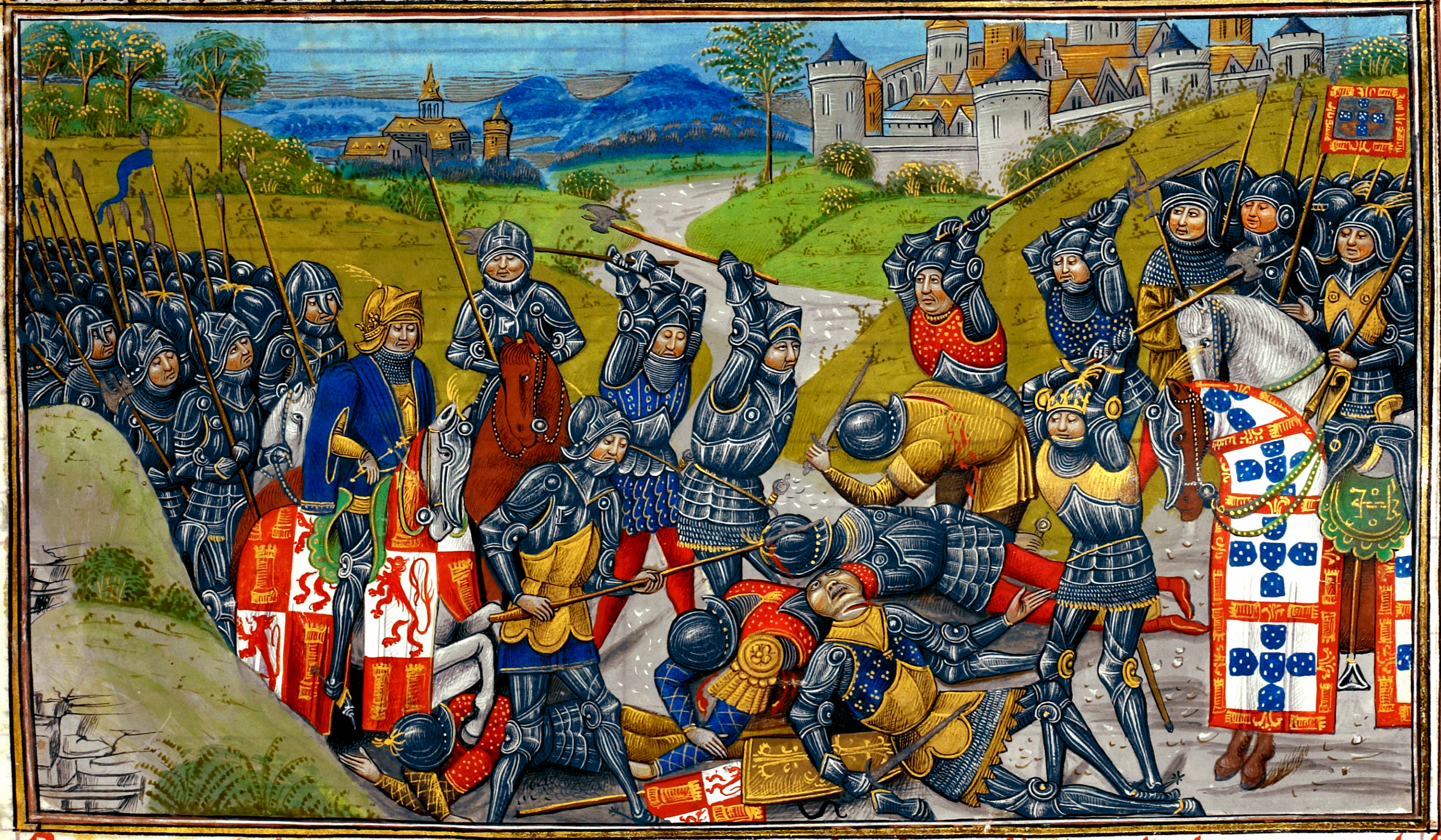
In the battle of Aljubarrota, the new bourgeois elite of Lisbon and their national allies defeated the old feudal aristocracy and its ally, Castile.

A new chapter in the history of Lisbon was written with the social revolution of the 1383–1385 Crisis. This was a time of civil war in Portugal when no crowned king reigned. It began when King Ferdinand I of Portugal died without male heirs, and his kingdom ostensibly passed to the King of Castile, John I of Castile. The powerful aristocrats and clerics in the north of Portugal owned large estates in the south acquired during the redistribution of land after the Reconquista; their cultural point of view was similar to that of the Castilians, with an emphasis on social distinctions based on the possession of land. They were invested in the spirit of Crusade against the Moors from the Maghreb and the potential benefits of the union of all Hispania. However, these were not the main concerns of the merchants of Lisbon (many of them small gentry). For them, union with Castile meant a severing of trade links with England and the countries of northern Europe, and also with the Middle East; as well as a diversion of attention from their privileges and the building of commercial ships to the privileges of the nobles (fidalgos) and the waging of war with land armies. This helps explain why the merchants and lesser nobles supported the cause of the Master of Avis.

The war fought in 1383–1385 was at bottom a war between the conservative land-owning medieval aristocracy (very similar to and allied with their Galician and Castilian counterparts) centred in the former County of Portugal in Minho (except the bourgeois city of Porto, a Lisbon ally, among a few other cities and personages of the north), and the rich merchants of the pluralistic society of Lisbon. The nobles had reclaimed the country from the Muslims and founded the northern counties—as their alliance with the Castilian nobility was reestablished, the increasing dominance of Lisbon threatened their supremacy. For the merchants of Lisbon, a commercial city, the feudal practices and land wars of the Castilians were a threat to their business interests. It was the bourgeoisie who, with their English connections and substantial capital, would win the struggle. The Master of Avis was acclaimed King John I of Portugal, his forces having survived the Siege of Lisbon in 1384 and won the Battle of Aljubarrota in 1385 against the forces of Castile and the northern Portuguese nobles, under the leadership of his constable Nuno Álvares Pereira/ The new Portuguese aristocracy rose from the merchant class of Lisbon, and it is only from this date that the centre of power in north Portugal actually moved to Lisbon, it becoming a sort of city-state, whose interests almost entirely determined the course of the country's independence.

The new bourgeois nobles built their palaces and stately homes in the Santos neighbourhood; other important buildings included the university, which had returned to Lisbon in the Alfama; the Carmo Church (Igreja do Carmo); the Alfândega (Customs Building); and some of the first residential buildings built in medieval Europe with several floors (up to five). The town had the narrow, winding streets characteristic of medina quarters, mostly unpaved, its houses alternating with gardens and orchards. As the city continued to grow, the widespread abandonment of highly productive Moorish irrigation techniques meant that it had to import wheat from Castile, France, the Rhineland and even Morocco. With this expansion into the countryside, the adjacent territory became suburbs like those of other European commercial cities. Lisbon, along with Antwerp, served the same function of an organised trade centre on the Atlantic coast as Venice, Genoa, Barcelona or Ragusa on the Mediterranean; or Hamburg, Lubeck and the other cities on the Baltic Sea. Wanting to improve public hygiene, the city council in 1417 prohibited garbage piles near the Carmo Monastery and other areas, and in 1426 another law was enacted prohibiting the dumping of trash in the streets, under penalty of paying a fine.

Portuguese foreign policy promoted the interests of Lisbon: trade and cooperation agreements were signed with the commercial city-states of Venice (accord of 1392), Genoa (1398), Pisa and Florence, whose merchants had already formed communities in the city, and many of whom were naturalised and married into the Portuguese nobility. Ceuta on the north African coast was captured by the Portuguese in 1415, giving Lisbon's merchants a base from which to attack Saracen pirates and better local control of the Mediterranean trade that passed through the Strait of Gibraltar, as well as the importation of Moroccan wheat at the best prices. Moreover, at this time Ceuta received caravans bearing gold and ivory, a trade Lisbon wanted to dominate, and it was feared that its Castilian rivals in Seville or the Aragonese of Barcelona might seize the outpost. A renewed alliance with England, one of its most important trade partners, was pursued.

== Lisbon, mistress of the seas ==
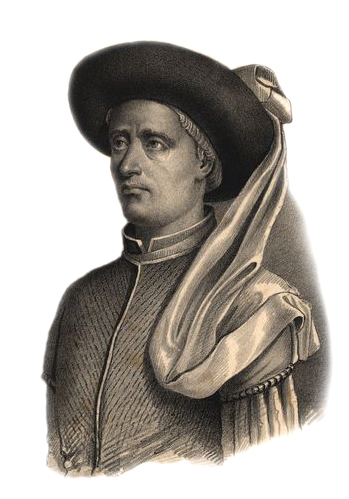
Prince Henry the Navigator

The prosperity of Lisbon was threatened when the Ottoman Empire invaded and conquered the Arab territories of North Africa, Egypt and the Middle East in the 15th century. The Turks were initially hostile to the interests of Lisbon and its allies in Venice and Genoa; consequently the trade in spices, gold, ivory and other goods suffered heavily. The merchants of Lisbon, many of them descendants of Jews or Muslims with links to North Africa, reacted by seeking to negotiate directly with the sources of these goods, without using Muslim mediators. The Portuguese Jews' connections with the Jews of the Maghreb, and the conquest of Ceuta, allowed the Lisbon merchants to spy on the Arab merchants. They learned that the gold, slaves and ivory brought to Morocco in the great caravans travelled through the Sahara desert from the Sudan (which at that time included all the savannas south of the desert, the current Sahel). and that spices like black pepper were transported to Egyptian ports on the Red Sea from India. The new strategy of the merchants of Lisbon – Christian and Jewish Portuguese, Italian and Portuguese-Italian – was to send ships to the sources of these valuable products.

Prince Henry, based in the city of Tomar, was the major proponent of this initiative,. As headquarters of the Order of Christ (formerly the Knights Templar), and with a large community of Jewish merchants, the city was also very connected to Lisbon by its trade in grains and nuts (one of Lisbon's main exports). The ready access to large amounts of capital and knowledge of the Orient that the Templars and the Jews had were key to achieving the objectives of the Lisbon merchants. Although Prince Henry was the driving force of this project, it was not actually of his own design, but rather had been conceived by the merchants of Lisbon. Those who supported the monarchy financially by the payment of taxes and customs tariffs, making it virtually independent of the resources of the territorial nobles, bent it to their own mercantilist purposes. Prince Henry was, however, the organiser of the state's policy of dirigisme (state-directed investment): the substantial risk involved and the capital needed to finance the opening of new trade routes required the cooperation of all merchants throughout the realm (just as today many large capital projects are undertaken with international cooperation). Henry organised and supervised preparations by the Portuguese merchant fleet to reach the sources of gold, ivory and slaves, efforts that the merchants themselves had managed inefficiently. Using funds made available by the Order of Christ, mariners' schools were founded to centralise the resources and practical knowledge of the merchants of Lisbon. Several expeditions were launched under contract to some of the most influential of the bourgeoisie in Lisbon, and the Gulf of Guinea was finally reached around 1460, the year Prince Henry died.

After Henry's death, by which time the sea route was already open, the expansion of the African trade led to the rise of a private sector in the Portuguese economy. In 1469, Afonso V granted the Lisbon merchant Fernão Gomes the monopoly of this trade, in exchange for exploring 100 leagues southward on the West African coastline each year for five years, and payment of an annual rent of 200,000 reais. With his profits from the African trade, Gomes assisted Afonso in the conquests of Asilah, Alcácer Ceguer, and Tangier in Morocco, where he was knighted

Meanwhile, there were new attempts by the remaining feudal nobles of northern Portugal to retake control of the kingdom, frustrated as they were by the growing prosperity of Lisbon's merchants in contrast to their own loss of income. Their purpose was to seek further conquest in North Africa, which offered the prospect of more and relatively easy victories. Such a campaign would be favorable to the interests of the feudal nobles, who stood to gain lands and tenants in Morocco by waging war, but was anathema to the merchant nobles and Jews in Lisbon who would be paying the extra taxes needed to finance such expeditions. The merchants favored investing the resources of the kingdom and its military forces in the discovery of new African and Asian markets, not in augmenting the power of the hostile and pro-Castilian Portuguese nobility. The ongoing disputes that John II engaged in against these nobles, with the backing of the merchants, demonstrate the underlying reality of the conflict between Lisbon and the former County of Portugal, birthplace of the nation: its resolution would set the future course of the country. Following the exposure of several conspiracies and various other incidents of their treachery, the northern nobles again sought the aid of their Castilian counterparts, but Lisbon and its merchants eventually prevailed: the ringleaders of one plot were executed, including the Duke of Braganza in 1483 and the Duke of Viseu in 1484. A great confiscation of estates followed and enriched the Crown, which now became the sole political power of the realm, aside from the Catholic Church. John II famously restored the policies of active Atlantic exploration, reviving the work of his great-uncle, Henry the Navigator. The Portuguese explorations were his main priority in government, pushing ever further south on the west coast of Africa with the purpose of discovering the maritime route to India and breaking into the spice trade. The colonial ventures in north Africa were abandoned to pursue trade in the new lands discovered further south.

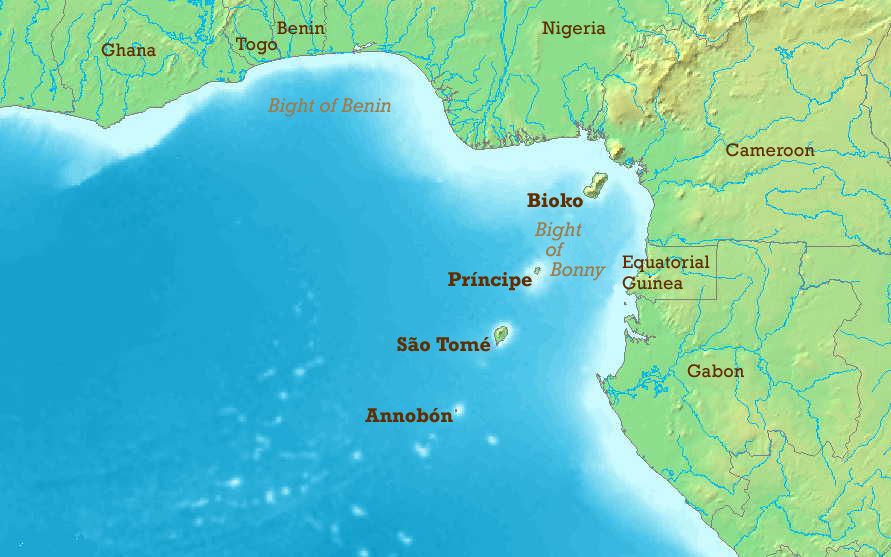
Gulf of Guinea

As the islands of Madeira and the Azores were colonised, the Crown encouraged production of commercial products for export to Lisbon, primarily cane sugar and wine, which soon appeared in the markets of the capital. In the recently discovered land of Guinea, cheap products like metal pots and cloth distributed from Lisbon-controlled depots were exchanged for gold, ivory and slaves. The natives of the region relocated their economic activities closer to the coast for this European trade, but their settlements were left unmolested because such campaigns of conquest were deemed too costly. Sham weddings between officials of the trading posts and the daughters of local chieftains were made to facilitate commerce, albeit with an aim for profit, not colonisation. The result was a new impetus to trade in Lisbon: wheat was shipped from Ceuta, as well as musk, indigo, other clothing dyes, and cotton from Morocco. Significant amounts of gold were obtained from Guinea and the Gold Coast; other sources of this precious metal were sorely lacking in Europe of the late 15th century. Berber slaves from the Canaries and later, black Africans, were trafficked in the often brutal slave trade.

The best markets and most valuable products were to be found, however, in India and the East. The war between the Ottoman Empire and Venice resulted in greatly increased prices for black pepper, other spices, and silks brought by the Venetians to Italy from the Ottoman-controlled Egypt, which received Arabian boats sailing from India at its ports on the Red Sea (and thence to Lisbon and the rest of Europe). To circumvent the "Turkish problem", a voyage of discovery to be captained by Vasco da Gama was organised, again on the initiative of the Lisbon merchants, but this time with royal funding; his boats arrived in India in 1498.

Before the end of the 16th century, the Portuguese merchant fleets had reached China (where they founded the commercial colony of Macau), as well as the island archipelagos of present-day Indonesia and Japan. They established the ports of call of the Eastern trade route and made commercial agreements with the chiefs and kings in Angola and Mozambique. A large colonial empire was consolidated by Afonso de Albuquerque, his armed forces securing those ports on the Indian Ocean in locations convenient for ships outbound from Lisbon against competition from the Turks and Arabs. Local territories were generally not seized, excepting the ports that carried on a profitable trade with the natives. Meanwhile, on the other side of the world, Pedro Álvares Cabral had arrived at Brazil in 1500.

Lisbon from Georg Braun and Frans Hogenberg's atlas Civitates orbis terrarum, 1572

As the Portuguese merchant fleets established the ports of call of the Eastern trade route and made commercial agreements with their rulers, Lisbon gained access to the sources of products it exclusively sold to the rest of Europe for many years: in addition to African products including pepper, cinnamon, ginger, nutmeg, herbs, and cotton fabrics, as well as diamonds from Malabar in India transported on the Carreira da Índia ("India Run"), it sold Moluccan spices, Ming porcelain and silk from China, slaves from Mozambique, brazilwood and Brazilian sugar. Lisbon also traded in fish (mainly salted cod from the Grand Banks), dried fruit, and wine. Other Portuguese cities, like Porto and Lagos, contributed to foreign trade only marginally, the country's commerce being practically limited to the exports and imports of Lisbon. The city still controlled much of the commerce of Antwerp through its depot there, which exported fine fabrics to the rest of Europe. The German and Italian merchants, seeing their trade routes, by land in the case of the first, and by the Mediterranean sea in the second, mostly abandoned, founded large trading houses in Lisbon for re-exporting goods to Europe and the Middle East.

As Lisbon became the prime market for luxury goods to satisfy the tastes of the elite classes all across Europe: Venice and Genoa were ruined. The Lisbons controlled for several decades all trade from Japan to Ceuta. In the 16th century Lisbon was one of the richest cities in the world, and the city gained a mythic stature. England and the Netherlands were obliged to imitate the Portuguese mercantile model to halt the loss of foreign exchange. Meanwhile, merchants migrated from all over Europe to establish their businesses in Lisbon, and even some Indian, Chinese, and Japanese traders found their way to the city. Large numbers of African and a few Brazilian Indian slaves were imported at this time as well. During the reign of King Manuel I, festivals were celebrated on the streets of Lisbon with parades of lions, elephants, camels and other animals not seen in Europe since the time of the Roman circus. In 1515, Afonso de Albuquerque presented an Indian rhinoceros to King Manuel, who had it let loose in a ring with an elephant to test the reputed mutual animosity of the two species. The rhinoceros was then forwarded as a gift to Pope Leo X. In Europe the prestige of Lisbon and its land discoveries had grown so great that when Thomas More wrote his book Utopia, about the political system of an ideal and imaginary island nation, he tried to further its plausibility by saying that the Portuguese had discovered it.

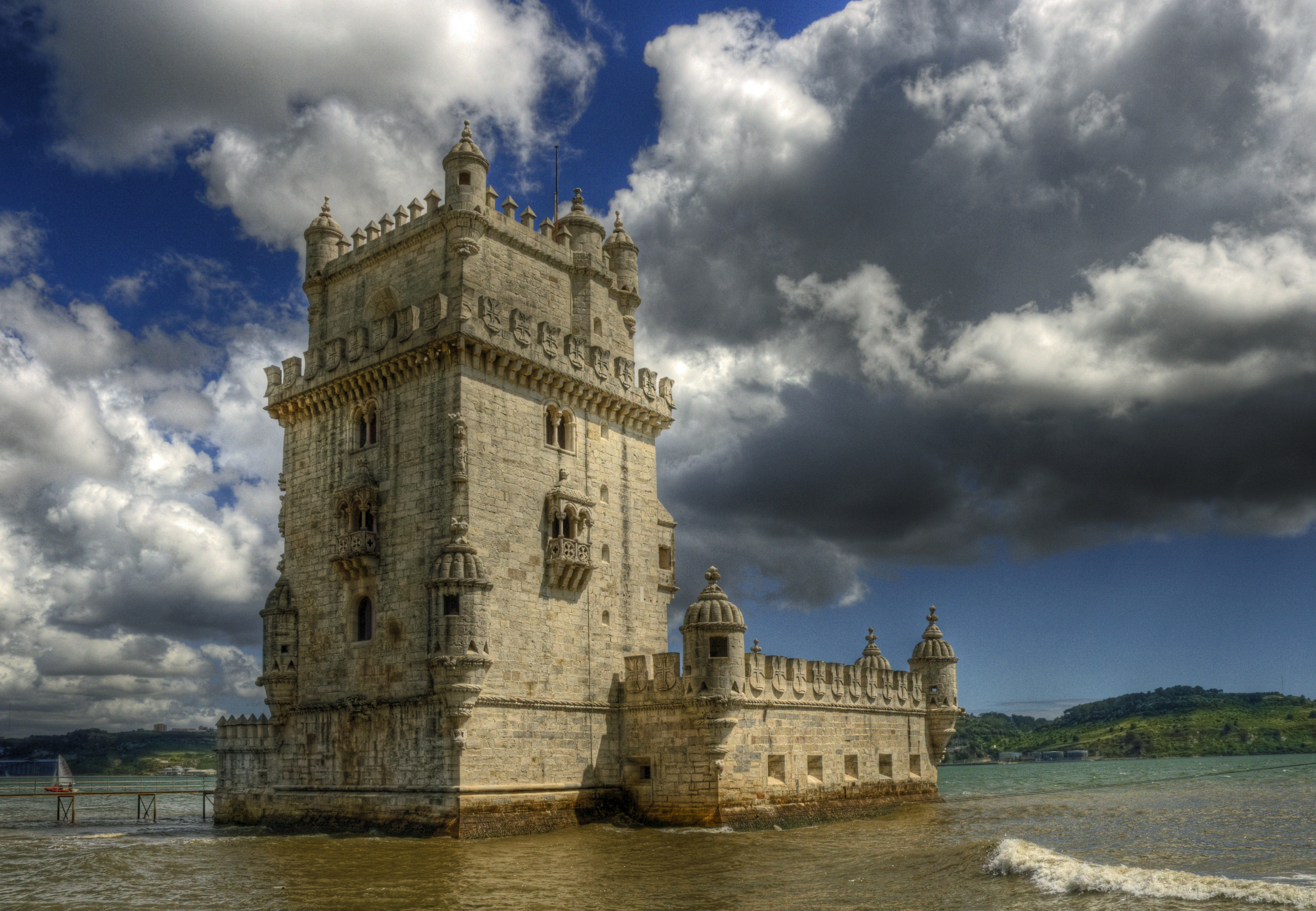
Belém Tower

To organise private trade and manage the collection of taxes, the great Portuguese trading houses of the capital were founded in the late 15th-century: the Casa da Mina ( House of Mina), the Casa dos Escravos (House of Slaves), the Casa da Guiné (House of Guinea), the Casa da Flandres (House of Flanders), and the famous Casa da Índia (House of India). Their huge revenues were used to finance construction of the Jerónimos Monastery and the Torre de Belém (Belém Tower), prominent examples of the Manueline architectural style (evocative of the overseas discoveries and trade), the Forte de São Lourenço do Bugio with its garrison and heavy artillery on an island in the Tagus, the Terreiro do Paço (Palace Square), the new and imposing Paço da Ribeira or Ribeira Palace (destroyed in the earthquake of 1755), and the "Arsenal do Exercito" (Military Arsenal), all raised next to the Mar da Palha; and even the Hospital Real de Todos-os-Santos (Royal Hospital of All Saints). Numerous palaces and mansions were built by the merchants with their profits. As the city expanded and reached nearly 200,000 inhabitants, the Bairro Alto urbanisation (known initially as Vila Nova de Andrade) was developed by the wealthy Galicians Bartolomeu de Andrade and his wife, and quickly became the richest neighbourhood in town.

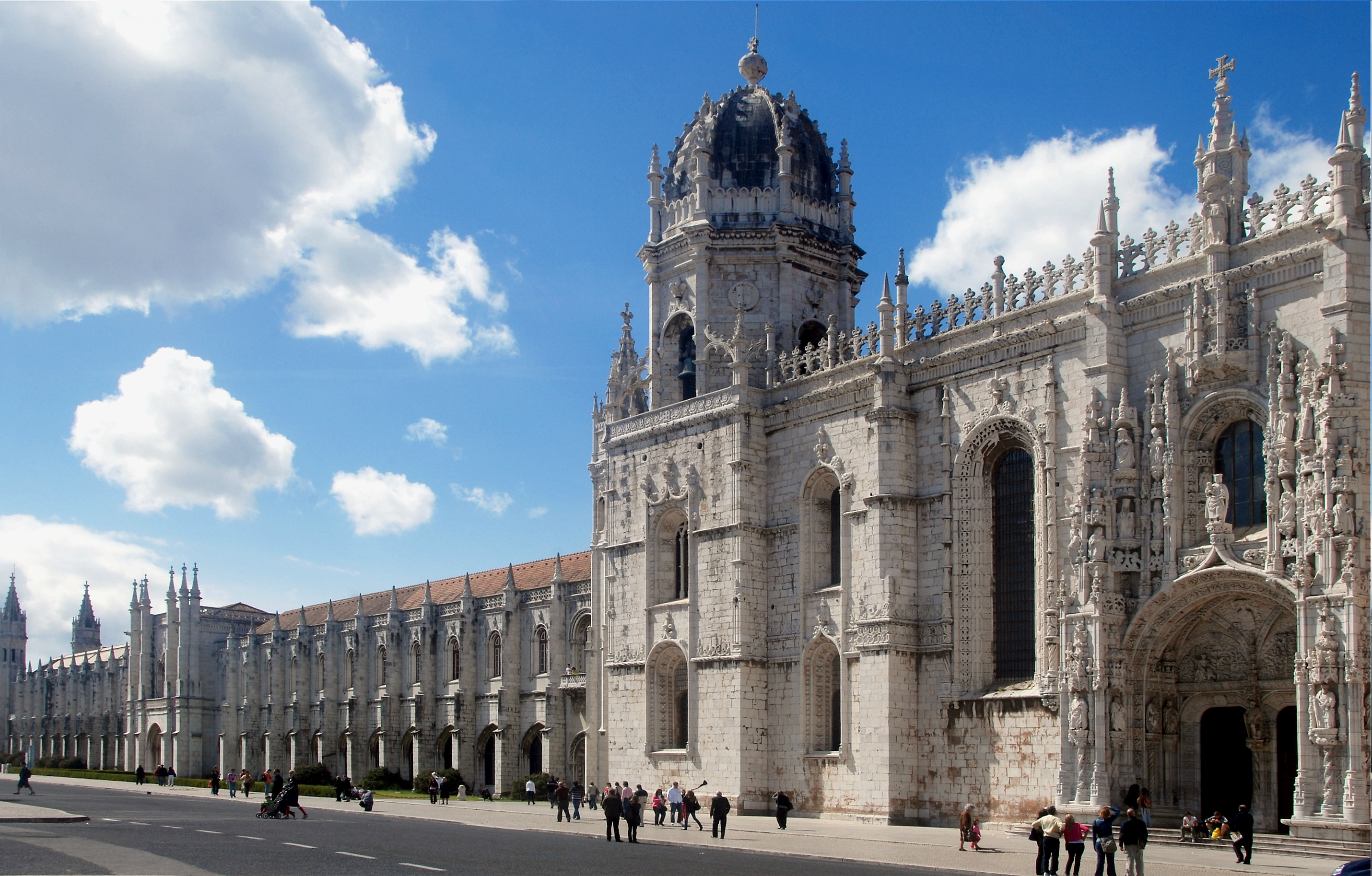
Jerónimos Monastery

The 16th century in Lisbon was the cultural golden age for Portuguese science and arts and letters: among the scientists who called the city home were the humanist Damião de Góis (friend of Erasmus and Martin Luther), the mathematician Pedro Nunes, the physician and botanist Garcia da Orta and Duarte Pacheco Pereira; and the writers Luís de Camões, Bernardim Ribeiro, Gil Vicente and others. Isaac Abravanel, one of the greatest Hebrew philosophers, was appointed the King's Treasurer. All social classes benefited from the city's prosperity, although the urban nobility serving in royal administration and the bourgeoisie benefited the most, but even the common people enjoyed luxuries unattainable to their English, French or German contemporaries. Heavy manual labour was done by African slaves and by Galicians. The first African slaves were sold in Praça do Pelourinho (Pelourinho Square); they were separated from their families, worked all day without pay, and were subject to brutal treatment. The Galicians, although uprooted from their homes, certainly found their lot improved, considering their miserable condition in rural Spain, and their language being very similar to Portuguese facilitated their integration into Portuguese society. By the mid-16th century, ten percent of Lisbon's population was of African descent.

The Jewish population, as always, included some of the poor, as well as scholars, merchants, and financiers who were among the most educated and wealthy citizens in the city. A commentary on the Pentateuch, written in Hebrew by Moses ben Nahman, and published by Eliezer Toledano in 1489, was the first book printed in Lisbon. In 1496, the Spaniards expelled the Jews from Spanish territory, motivated by a fundamentalist spirit that demanded an exclusively Christian kingdom. Many of the Jews fled to Lisbon, and may have temporarily doubled its population. Although acknowledging the central importance of the Jews to the city's prosperity, Manuel I decreed in 1497 that all Jews must convert to Christianity, only those who refused being forced to leave, but not before the expropriation of their property. His desire to wed Princess Isabel of Castile, daughter of the Catholic Monarchs, who required that he first expel all the Jews of Portugal, is generally given as his reason for the forced conversions. For many years these New Christians had practiced Judaism in secret or openly despite the riots and the violence perpetrated against them (many Jewish children were torn from their parents and given to Christian families who treated them as slaves). For now, they were tolerated till the start of the Inquisition in Portugal decades later. Without the disadvantage of being considered Jewish, they were able to rise in the social hierarchy, even to the higher ranks of the court. Again the elite descendants of the ancient families of the old aristocracy of Asturias and Galicia created barriers to the social ascent of Jews, who were often better-educated and more proficient than their antagonists. The anti-semitic movement among the Old Christians infected the common people, and in 1506, spurred by the perceived blasphemy of some injudicious remarks uttered by a converso over the occurrence of a supposed miraculous event at the Church of São Domingos, and then further inflamed by the invective of three Dominican friars, culminated in a massacre of New Christians, in which between 3,000 and 4,000 people were killed. The king was at Evora when these events occurred, but angered when he received the news, he ordered an investigation which resulted in two of the instigating friars being excommunicated and burned alive, and the Dominicans were expelled from their convent.

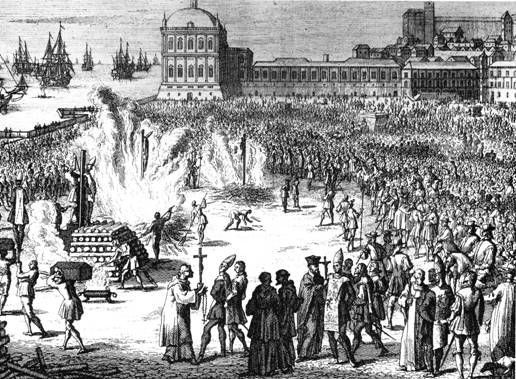
Burning at the stake by the Portuguese Inquisition at the Terreiro do Paço in front of the Ribeira Palace

As a result of the dissension aroused by this catastrophe, King Manuel was persuaded by the territorial nobles to introduce the Inquisition (which did not become formally active until 1536) during the reign of his son and successor, King John III, and legal restrictions were imposed on all descendants of New Christians (similar to those the Old Christians had imposed on the Jews), to prevent them from threatening senior government posts held by the Old Christian aristocracy. The first auto-da-fé was held at the Palace Square in 1540. Besides the Inquisition, other social problems arose; in 1569 the great Plague of Lisbon killed 50,000 people.

The inquisition put to death many of the New Christians, and expropriated the property and wealth of many others. The riches of even some Old Christian merchants were expropriated after false anonymous complaints were made that the inquisitors accepted as valid, since the property of the condemned reverted to themselves. On the other hand, few merchants would not have had some New Christian ancestry, as marriages between the children of Christian and Jewish partners in the major firms were commonplace. The Inquisition thus became an instrument of social control in the hands of the Old Christians against almost all the Lisbon merchants, and finally restored their long lost supremacy.

In this climate of intolerance and persecution, the expansion of the economy enabled by the genius of the traders was undone by the large landowners (whose collectible rents were much less than the receipts of the merchants), and the prosperity of Lisbon was destroyed. The former climate of liberalism conducive to trade disappeared and was replaced by Catholic fanaticism and a rigid conservatism. The noble elites persecuted those who were alleged to be not of "pure blood" and truly Old Christian. Many of the merchants fled to England or the Netherlands, bringing their naval and cartographic knowledge with them as they settled in those places. Lisbon was taken by the feudal mentality of the great nobles, and the Portuguese merchants, with no security or social support and unable to obtain credit during the persecutions of the Inquisition, could not compete with the English and Dutch merchants (many of them of Portuguese origin) who subsequently took over the markets of India, the East Indies and China.

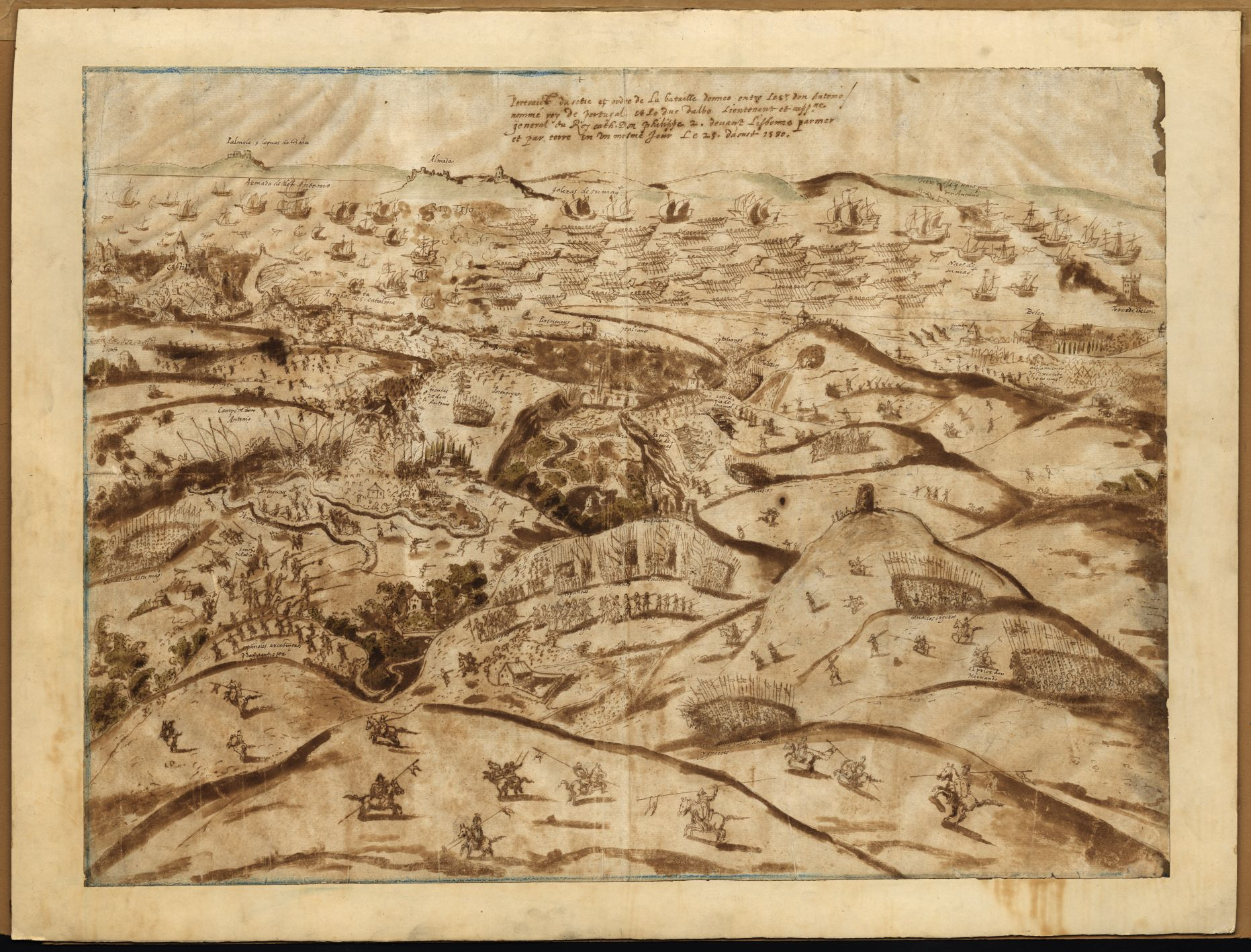
Battle of Alcântara (1580)

The young king Sebastian I was burning with zeal to go to Morocco and stop the advances of the Turkish-supported armies, an enterprise which held the promise of more land and revenues in North Africa for the nobles (they perhaps believing this would allow them to maintain their economic supremacy over the merchants), but the mercantile bourgeoisie also supported the effort as it would benefit Portuguese commerce in North Africa. Sebastian used much of Portugal's imperial wealth to equip a large fleet and gather an army. He and the flower of the Portuguese nobility were killed in the military disaster of the Battle of Alcácer Quibir in 1578, his death triggering a succession crisis, where the main claimants to the throne were Philip II of Spain and António, Prior of Crato. The remaining Portuguese nobles and the high clergy were gathered once again to the arms of their like-minded counterparts, the Castilians, and supported Philip, a maternal grandson of Manuel I of Portugal. Philip sent an army of 40,000 men under the command of the Duke of Alba to invade Portugal. They defeated António's troops at the Battle of Alcântara and Philip was crowned Philip I of Portugal in 1581. Thus he at least partly fulfilled the ambition of his father, the Habsburg King Carlos I of Spain (also Charles V of the Holy Roman Empire), who was famously quoted by Friar Nicolau de Oliveira: "Se eu fora Rei de Lisboa eu o fora em pouco tempo de todo o mundo" ("If I were King of Lisbon, I would soon rule over all the world.") The union of Portugal with Spain lasted sixty years (1580–1640).

== Philippine dynasty ==
The Philippine Dynasty was the third royal house of Portugal. It was named after the three Spanish kings who ruled Portugal from 1581 to 1640 in a dynastic union of the Castilian and Portuguese crowns. The three kings, all named Philip, belonged to the House of Habsburg. The 16th century was the golden age of Lisbon, a time when the city became the European hub of commerce with Africa, India, the Far East and, later, Brazil, accumulating great riches through the importation of spices, slaves, sugar, textiles and other goods. Nevertheless, the sixty years of Habsburg rule in Portugal beginning in 1580 coincided with a period of economic distress, social upheaval, and warfare in Europe that spread around the world through the colonial empires.

When King Sebastian of Portugal died at Alcácer Quibir in 1578 without heirs, he was succeeded by his great-uncle Henry of Portugal, who reigned until his own death on 31 January 1580. Henry also lacked heirs, and his death triggered the succession crisis of 1580, in which the main claimants to the throne were Philip II of Spain and Anthony, Prior of Crato. Philip was crowned king of Portugal as Philip I in 1581, beginning the union between the two nations known as the Iberian Union. After a three-year-long war with Anthony and his foreign allies, the resistance crumbled and the union was consolidated.

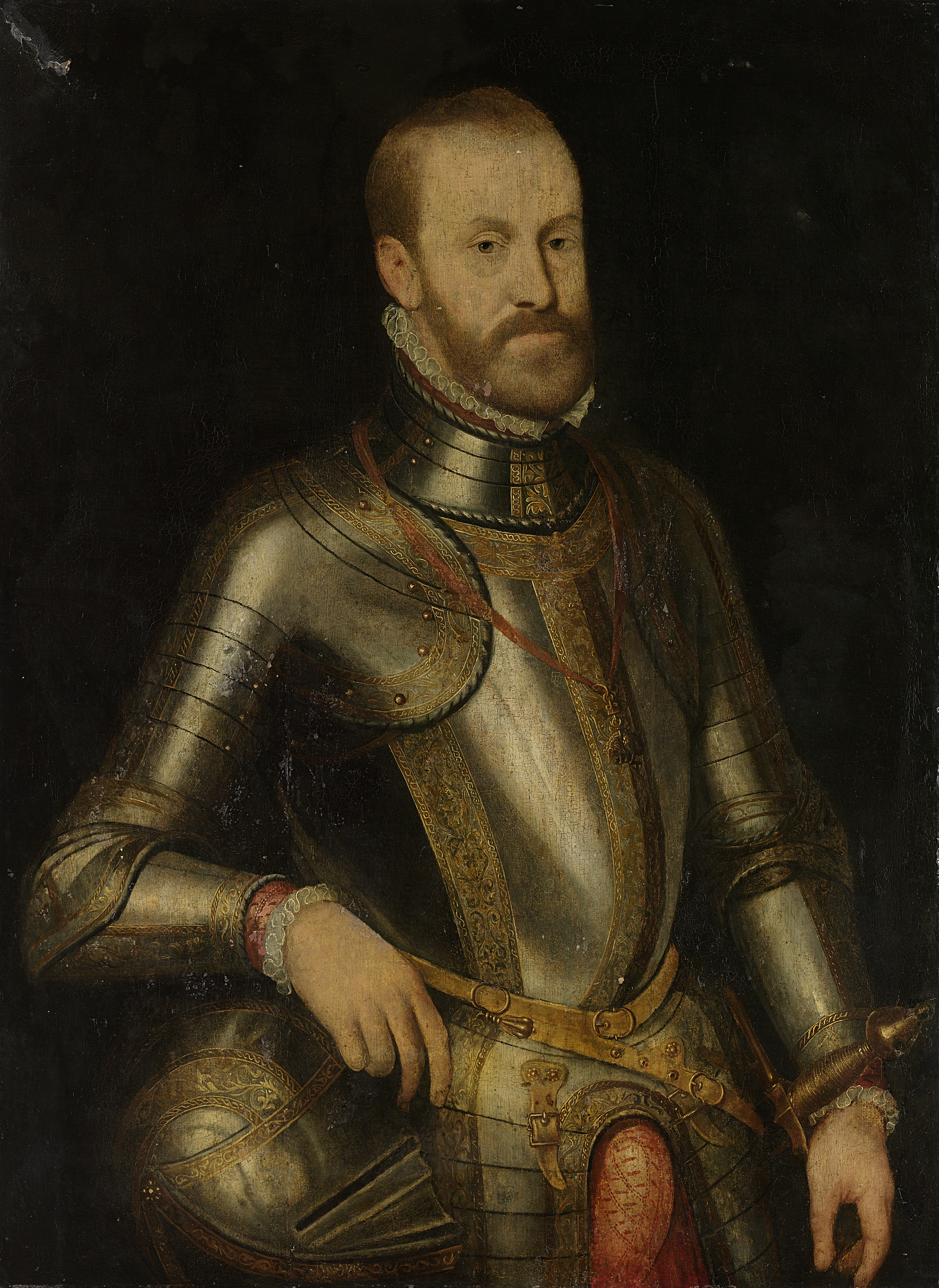
Philip II of Spain

In 1580, Philip started a series of construction works and renovations throughout Portugal, seeking to rehabilitate the kingdom after the War of the Portuguese Succession. During his three-year stay in Lisbon, from 1580 to 1583, Philip considered making the city the imperial capital of his trans-European monarchy and empire. To better suit the city for his extravagant court, he ordered the remodeling and expansion of Ribeira Palace, under the supervision of Filippo Terzi of Bologna, the Master of the Royal Works. The king decided to modernise the palace, stripping it of its early renaissance Manueline style and converting it into a monumental Mannerist complex. The highlight of the Philippine renovations was the reconstruction and enlargement of the Torre do Rei (Tower of the King), which transformed the three-story Manueline tower that housed the Casa da Índia into a five-story Mannerist tower, complete with an observatory and one of the largest royal libraries in all of Europe.

Philip also ordered the reconstruction of the Monastery of São Vicente de Fora (Mosteiro de São Vicente de Fora), a prime example of ecclesiastical structures built to reinforce a religious piety that instilled a sense of loyalty to the Catholic monarchy. The plan for the building, produced by Juan de Herrera in Madrid, was adapted in Lisbon by Filippo Terzi. Other works were begun to defend against pirate raids from the north, with new city walls and fortifications built according to military engineering principles of the time: these included the Torre do Bugio on an island in the middle of the Mar del Plata; and others in Cascais, Setúbal and on the south bank of the Tagus. Dutch and English pirates, among them Francis Drake, made several attacks on some Portuguese town squares, but did not dare to attack Lisbon.

Philip attempted to reconcile the interests of the Portuguese nobility in acquiring more territory in Europe with those of the clergy in halting the spread of Protestantism, as well as those of the bourgeoisie in eliminating mercantile competition and privateering by the English and Dutch. All the boats capable of military action in Lisbon, Seville and Barcelona were gathered in an armada sent against England in 1588 with the express purpose of escorting an army from Flanders to invade the island nation across the Channel. The strategic aim was to overthrow Queen Elizabeth I and the Tudor establishment of Protestantism in England. Philip sent the large mercenary infantry regiments (terços) of the Army of Flanders, commanded by the Duke of Parma, to the coast of Flanders in preparations for the invasion. A combination of severe storms in the North Atlantic, the faster and more maneouverable ships of the English navy, and the superior seamanship of the English admirals resulted in the destruction of the Spanish fleet and put an end to these plans.

From the Portuguese succession crisis in 1580 to the beginning of the reign of the monarchs of the House of Braganza in 1640 was an era of transition in Lisbon. The Portuguese Empire's spice trade was near its height at the start of this period, having expanded to global influence after Vasco da Gama had finally reached the East by sailing around Africa to India in 1497–1498. Da Gama's achievement completed the exploratory efforts inaugurated by Henry the Navigator, and opened an oceanic route for the profitable spice trade into Europe that bypassed the Middle East, greatly enriching the city's merchants as well as the royal treasury.

Throughout the 17th century, the increasing predations and surrounding of Portuguese trading posts in the East by the Dutch, English and French, and their rapidly growing intrusion into the Atlantic slave trade, undermined Portugal's near monopoly on the lucrative oceanic spice and slave trades. This sent the Portuguese spice trade into a long decline. The diversion of wealth from Portugal by the Habsburg monarchy to help support the Catholic side of the Thirty Years' War also strained the union, although Portugal did benefit from Spanish military power in retaining Brazil and in disrupting Dutch trade. Over time, Portugal became economically dependent on its colonies, first India and then Brazil.

As the Dutch and English made encroachments on the overseas trade, they were unable to seize the Spanish territorial empires of Mexico and Peru, so they concentrated on taking the Portuguese trading posts, ports and coastal colonies that provided the goods trafficked in Lisbon. The northeastern ports of Brazil, the Cape of Good Hope, other ports in East Africa, Ceylon, Malacca and the Moluccas Islands were taken, as well as the island of Formosa (Taiwan) and the trade concession in Japan.

Lisbon, with its merchants persecuted by the Inquisition (which expropriated the property of Crypto-Jews and even that of genuine Christians), and having already lost much of its fleet in the disaster of the Spanish Armada, as well as paying high taxes to support the armies of the Spanish nobles in Europe, began gradually to lose its overseas ports and its access to foreign products. Although the Portuguese royal monopoly suffered from competition by the Dutch joint-share trading companies, the private enterprises of the Portuguese merchants faced only limited competition from their European rivals until 1600. In the 17th century their share of the Asian trade declined and profits shrank, but they lost no markets in Asia to the Dutch and English trading companies through the 1630s. However, from the 1640s and 1650s onward the northern European merchants dominated the Atlantic economy and overseas trade.

With the rise of bureaucratic government ("government by paper") in the administration of the empire during the Philippine age, the Spanish inevitably found deficiencies in Portuguese administration both in Portugal and its overseas colonies, to the point that a new code of Portuguese law, the Ordenações Filipinas (Philippine Decrees), was promulgated in 1603. The city's mercantile operations and Its potential as a centre of maritime trade were described by the Portuguese cartographer, Pedro Teixeira Albernaz, who conducted a survey in 1622 of all the coasts of the Iberian peninsula at the order of Philip III. The results were published at Madrid in 1634.

Portugal was brought low during the final years of the reign of Philip III, as the Spanish officials often flagrantly violated the conditions granted by Philip I, which were the original contract and unalterable constitution of Portugal while it was subject to the monarchs of Castile. Lisbon, the once great cosmopolitan city, was reduced to the rank of a provincial city with no influence among the higher Spanish nobility who governed from Madrid, their conservative and fundamentalist Catholic capital. Lisbon lost much of its population and its importance to the world economy as its mercantile activity shrank. With economic decline, unemployment and crime increased greatly, adding to the misery of the common people. The Spanish authorities were obliged to introduce a kind of auxiliary police force, the Quadrilheiros, whose members patrolled the streets to control street crime, fights, sorcery and gaming.

Half a century of continual war and more than a century of depredations by privateers and pirates weighed heavily on the administration and defence of the Portuguese empire, spread as it was across Asia, Africa and America, and exhausted the Portuguese treasury. In 1640, Count-Duke de Olivares, royal favourite of Philip IV and prime minister of Spain, imprudently chose to levy a special tax upon Portugal in violation of its constitution, at the very time when the Catalans, a merchant people like those of Lisbon, and also oppressed by Castilian taxes, were on the verge of armed rebellion. Then the prime minister of Portugal, Miguel de Vasconcelos, on the advice of the Spanish nobility, and with the complicity of the Portuguese feudal nobles, announced the Spanish minister's intention of abolishing the Portuguese Cortes, and of making the country a mere province of Castile with its own representatives in the Castilian Cortes. This provocation was the last straw for those Portuguese who desired the restoration of Portugal's independence.

== Portuguese Restoration War ==
During the so-called 'Philippine dominion', royal power in Portugal was administered mostly by viceroys and governors; this period ended in 1640 when the Portuguese Restoration War was initiated against Spain, and Portugal regained its independence (the Restauração) under the Braganza (Bragança) dynasty.

The merchants of Lisbon allied themselves with the lower and the middle Portuguese nobility and entreated the Duke of Braganza to accept the throne. According to some historians he was really as indifferent as he seemed and it was the ambition of his wife and of his allies that made him king. Some of them assert as well that the duke was hesitant because he, like the rest of the high nobility, benefited by Madrid's rule, but that the prospect of becoming king finally persuaded him. In any event, on 1 December 1640, the conspirators assailed the royal palace and the citadel of Lisbon, and meeting little resistance, acclaimed the duke as the new King of Portugal, John IV (João IV).

== Brazilian gold ==
Post-Restoration Lisbon was increasingly dominated by Catholic religious orders. Traditionally, the second and third sons in a family, who received no inheritance from the father under the law of primogeniture, had gone into trade or other business overseas, but under current depressed economic conditions they took refuge in religious orders where they obtained church sinecures or lived off alms. This led to such a proliferation of priests, nuns and friars that they became a significant proportion of the population.

The financial plight of the country was finally relieved, not by the successful prosecution of state-issued directives, but by the colonial government's exploitation of the deposits of gold discovered 1693–1695 in what is now the state of Minas Gerais (General Mines) in Brazil. The Portuguese state charged a tax of one-fifth of the gold extracted from the mines, known as the royal fifth (quinto del rey), which began arriving in Lisbon in 1699; revenues rose quickly, peaking at more than 3 tonnes annually in the early 1750s, representing almost the entire budget of the state. With the large income generated by this surge in gold production, opulent buildings were commissioned by the clergy and the aristocracy of Lisbon. These were built in the new Baroque architectural style of the Counter-Reformation; among them were several palaces and the Church of Santa Engrácia (Igreja de Santa Engrácia), which in the 20th century was converted into the National Pantheon (Panteão Nacional).

In contrast to the luxurious lifestyle of the elite classes, the common people generally lived under wretched conditions, even though demand for manual labour to construct new buildings increased as the population grew. The first descriptions of Lisbon as a dirty and degraded city were written in this period, just two centuries after its having been among the most prosperous and cosmopolitan in Europe.

The late 17th-century discoveries of gold and diamond deposits in Brazil were the most important such finds ever made in the colonial New World. Between 1700 and 1800 a thousand metric tonnes of gold were recorded as received by the Portuguese treasury, and another thousand tonnes may have evaded the royal fifth. Around 2.4 million carats of diamonds were extracted from the alluvial sources in Minas Gerais, while an unknown amount was smuggled out. These riches had a great economic impact there and in the mother country, encouraging large numbers of Portuguese to emigrate to the colony and giving it a more European character. Many of the settlers found their way to the gold-bearing region in the Atlantic Forest {Mata Atlântica}, where they could become prosperous enough to buy African slaves.

Increasing demand from Brazil benefited the merchants of Lisbon, who supplied the colonials with cloth and metal wares, as well as luxury items including spices, porcelain, silks, and velvets from Europe and Asia. Competition with British-financed merchants, who had direct access to sources for the precious metals mined in Brazil, caused the Lisbon merchants to enter the more open market of Luanda where they purchased captive Africans. They sold these slaves in exchange for gold at Rio de Janeiro, the port city that grew on the Atlantic coast to satisfy the demand for import goods created by the mining activities of Minas Gerais. To secure a larger portion of the lucrative Brazilian gold market, the Rio merchants worked out a strategy of obtaining slaves from traders in Angola.

== Earthquake of 1755 and Pombaline era ==
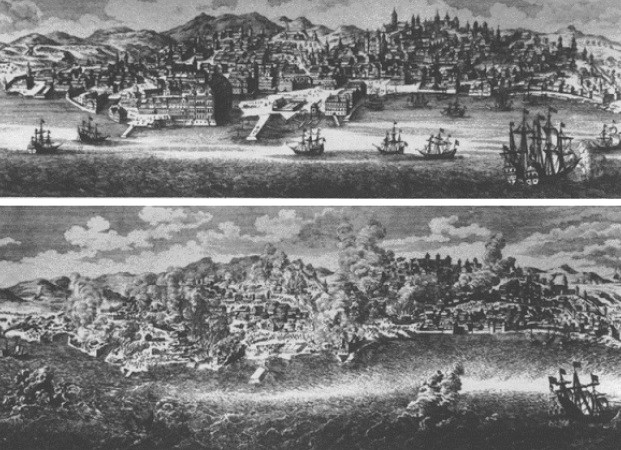
Lisbon before and after the 1755 earthquake

A new era began in Lisbon on 1 November 1755, All Saints Day, when a devastating earthquake, one of the most powerful in recorded history, destroyed two thirds of the city. The first shock struck at 9:40 a.m., followed by another tremor at 10:00 a.m., and a third at noon. Many persons rushed to those squares beside the River Tagus with enough space to escape the collapsing structures of the city, but were drowned by a 7-metre high tsunami that flooded the river's mouth about half an hour later. After the earthquake, the tsunami, and subsequent fires, Lisbon lay in ruins. The large Royal Turret, the Casa das Índias, the Carmo Convent (Convento da Ordem do Carmo), the Court of the Inquisition, and the Hospital de Todos-os-Santos were destroyed. Thousands of buildings collapsed, including many churches, monasteries, nunneries, and palaces. Of the 20,000 less solidly built houses of the lower classes, 17,000 were destroyed. Many buildings occupied by the rich in the Bairro Alto neighbourhood survived, as well as some buildings made of solid stone in a few other areas. Major fires raged in the city for six days and there was rampant looting. Of the city's 180,000 inhabitants, between 30,000 and 60,000 died, while many others lost their entire property. The Marquis of Pombal, who was inspired by the new political, economic, and scientific theories of the Enlightenment and had such influence over the king that he was de facto ruler of Portugal, seized the opportunity presented by the catastrophe to implement in Portugal some of the liberal reforms that had been tried successfully in other western European countries.

In 1756, the French philosopher and voice of the enlightenment, Voltaire, published a poem entitled Poème sur le désastre de Lisbonne ("Poem on the Lisbon Disaster") which expressed the shock and disillusionment of European intellectuals after the Lisbon earthquake, as well as his own rejection of the philosophical optimism popularised by the English poet, Alexander Pope, in his poem, An Essay on Man. Voltaire subsequently used the catastrophic event in his novella Candide, published in 1759, to satirise Leibnizian optimism, religion, and war.

Military engineers and surveyors under the supervision of chief engineer General Manuel da Maia (1672–1768), Colonel Carlos Mardel (1695–1763), and Captain Eugénio dos Santos (1711–1760) were ordered by the Marquis of Pombal to draw up plans for the rebuilding of the city, to inventory property claims, and to ensure that debris was removed safely and the bodies of the dead were disposed of in a sanitary manner. The Águas Livres Aqueduct (Aquaducto das Águas Livres), built by order of John V and put into service in 1748, was so well constructed that it was unharmed by the earthquake of 1755; it had 127 masonry arches, the highest of which is in the stretch crossing the Alcântara valley, and is 65 metres (213 ft) high.

As part of the reconstruction of downtown Lisbon, a new naval arsenal was erected by order of Pombal at the same site on the banks of the Tagus, west of the royal palace, where many of the ships of the Portuguese age of exploration were built, among them the naus and galleons that had opened the trade route to India. It was a vast building containing naval magazines and offices of different departments of the naval service. Renamed the Arsenal Real da Marinha (Royal Navy Shipyard), the official maritime works of the Ribeira das Naus continued operating there as in the expansive days of Manuel I, who had ordered the construction of new shipyards (tercenas) on the site of the medieval shipyards.

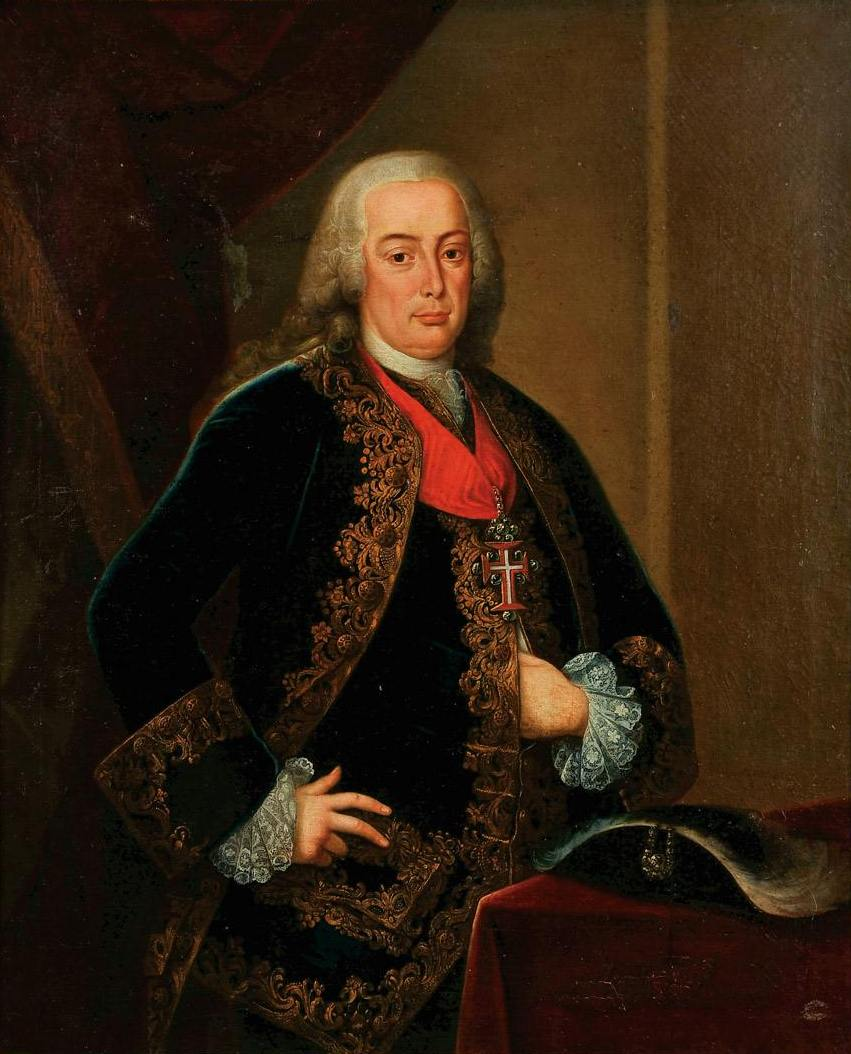
Marquis of Pombal

The 1st Marquis of Pombal, who had been born into the lower-ranking nobility, became effectively prime minister to Joseph I, after brief careers in the Portuguese army and the diplomatic service He famously responded to the king's query regarding what he should do about the devastation caused by the earthquake: "Bury the dead. Feed the living. Rebuild the city." This was a succinct expression of Pombal's approach to the recovery of the city's economy and social structure.

The marquis, after he had ordered a review of the actual situation through an unprecedented population survey, refused the counsel of some of his advisers who wished to move the capital to another city, and initiated reconstruction in Lisbon according to new theories of urban planning. The royal income from Brazil paid for almost the entire reconstruction project, its cost amounting to over 20 million silver cruzados. The city also received emergency aid from England, Spain and the Hansa, and subsequently filled with construction sites. Most of the Portuguese aristocracy took refuge on their country estates around Lisbon, while King Joseph and his court took up residence in a huge complex of tents and barracks built in Ajuda, on the outskirts of the city. This became the centre of Portuguese political and social life for a couple of years after the great earthquake, while repairs were made on the royal palace in Belém, then still an area outside the city.

Church of Saint Anthony, in Lisbon, the birthplace of Saint Anthony of Padua, also known as Anthony of Lisbon. It was fully rebuilt after the 1755 earthquake to a Baroque-Rococo design by architect Mateus Vicente de Oliveira

.

Most of the reconstruction was carried out, however, in the old city centre with a new layout approved by the marquis and designed by Eugenio dos Santos and Carlos Mardel, for the Baixa, the neighbourhood hardest hit by the earthquake. Their plan fit the pragmatic spirit of the age of Enlightenment, with the narrow old streets being replaced by wide straight avenues arranged orthogonally. These not only allowed proper ventilation and lighting of the streets, but also allowed for better security, including police patrols and access to buildings in case of fire, as well as measures to prevent the spread of fire to neighbouring structures. The buildings had to conform to regulations based on a consistent policy, with the architectural team defining which façade designs were allowed, and the rules of construction for all buildings. They aimed to reorganise the social structure of the city, with a new emphasis on mercantile business, and developed a set of rules for the construction of housing better able to survive a powerful earthquake.

The critical architectural innovation designed for this purpose consisted of a wooden skeleton called the gaiola pombalina (Pombal Cage), a flexible rectangular frame with diagonal braces enabling structures to withstand the overload and stress of an earthquake without coming apart. This wooden frame was erected atop walls with barrel vault arches on a masonry foundation, giving solidity and weight to the first floor of the buildings, intended for occupation by shops, offices and warehouses. All new structures in the downtown area were erected on pine log pilings driven into the sandy soil of the Baixa, to ensure the effective support of their weight. They were arranged according to their importance in a horizontal hierarchy based on proximity to the street (the uppermost storey would be reserved for poorer families with few possessions, usually having lower ceilings, communal balconies, smaller windows and smaller rooms). All the buildings had masonry firewalls separating them from each other. The standardization of façades, windows, doors, simple geometric patterns in the hallway tiles, etc. permitted accelerated progress of the works through the mass production of these elements on site.

The entire area was laid out along neo-Classical lines with classical proportions according to architectural rules of composition using the golden ratio. The structural core of the new city was the Rua Augusta, connecting the northern limit of the city, the Rossio, and the southern boundary, the Praça do Comércio, commonly referred to as the "Terreiro do Paço" (Palace Square), opening onto Rua Augusta through the triumphal Arco da Vitória (erected to commemorate the city's reconstruction but not finished until 1873). This plan is integral to the design of what was intended to be the new heart of commercial activity in the reconstructed city. The buildings surrounding the Palace Square were built to contain warehouses and the large commercial buildings expected to stimulate mercantile activity in the plaza, but after several years of abandonment were eventually occupied by government ministries, courts, the Navy Yard, the Customs building, and the stock exchange during the reign of Queen Maria I.

A new market was designed, although it was ultimately never built, at the north end, parallel to Rossio, at the square originally called Praça Nova (New Square), and today known as the Praça da Figueira. Despite their fervent desire to complete the project, rebuilding Lisbon took much longer than Pombal and his staff expected, its reconstruction not being completed until 1806. This was due largely to the lack of capital among the bourgeoisie of a city in crisis. With ruthless efficiency Pombal limited the power of the Church, expelled the Jesuits from Portuguese territories and brutally suppressed the power of the conservative territorial aristocracy. This led to a series of conspiracies and counter-conspiracies, culminating with the torture and public execution in 1759 of members of the Távora family and its closest relatives, who were implicated in a plot to assassinate the king, dispatch Pombal and put the conservative Duke of Aveiro on the throne. Some historians argue that this charge is unsupportable, that it was a hoax perpetrated by Pombal himself to limit the growing powers of the old aristocratic families.

By the 1770s Pombal had effectively neutralised the Inquisition, consequently the new Christians, still the majority of the educated and liberal middle class of the city and the country, were freed from their legal restrictions and finally allowed access to the high government positions previously the exclusive monopoly of the 'pureblood' aristocracy. Industry was supported in a somewhat dirigiste, but vigorous, manner, several royal factories being established in Lisbon and other cities that thrived. After the Pombaline period there were twenty new plants for every one that had previously existed. The various state-imposed taxes and duties, which had proven burdensome to trade, were abolished in 1755. Throughout the implementation of these initiatives by the Junta do Comércio, Pombal relied on donations and loans made by the merchants and industrialists of Lisbon.

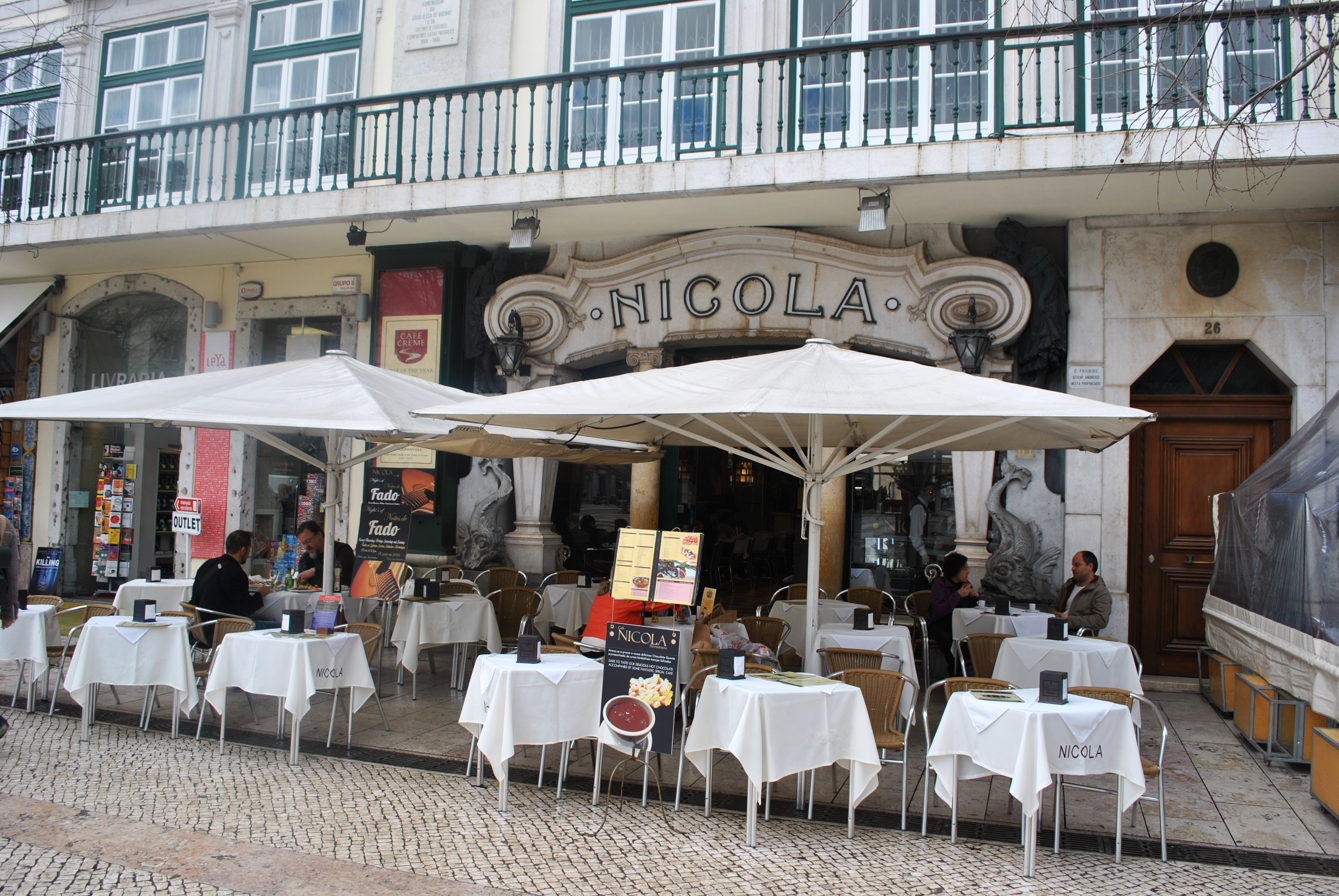
Nicola in Rossio Square

Signs of a recovering economy emerged slowly under the Portuguese economic renewal policy. The city grew gradually to 250,000 inhabitants who settled in all geographical directions, occupying the new neighbourhoods of Estrela and Rato, while its new industrial centre concentrated around the recent water supply brought by the aqueduct to the water tower of Alcântara. Many factories arose in the area, including the royal ceramic factory and the silk factory of Amoreiras, where mulberry trees were grown to provide leaves to feed the larvae of the silkworms used by the local silk factories. The Prime Minister tried continually to stimulate the rise of middle class, which he saw as essential to the country's development and progress. The first cafes owned by Italians were founded in the city around this time: some survive today such as Martinho da Arcada (1782) in the Palace Square and the Nicola in Rossio Square, whose Liberal owner, among others, illuminated the façade after each Progressive political victory. The richest burghers acquired the habit of holding social soirées, with the unprecedented participation of women, while among the conservative nobility women held their traditional place and did not participate. In this manner a self-conscious bourgeois middle class rose again from the people of Lisbon, composed of both New Christians and Old Christians; these were the source of the national Liberal and Republican political movements, their presence manifested by the publication of several new newspapers in the capital.

Pombal was forced to resign after the death of King Joseph and the ascension to the throne of his daughter, the very religious Maria I, whose great contribution to the nation's cultural patrimony was the building of the Basílica da Estrela. Under the advisement of the clergy and the conservative nobles, she dismissed the prime minister and sought to limit and even reversed some of his progressive reforms, a movement called the Viradeira. Economic conditions had greatly improved in the Pombaline era, but began to deteriorate under the new regime while budgetary problems mounted. To deal with rising poverty and crime, a police force was created in 1780 under the leadership of Diogo Pina Manique. Secular political persecution resumed at this time. The police hounded, arrested, tortured and expelled progressive partisans: Freemasons, Jacobins and liberals; as well as their newspapers, were censored. Many literary works by liberal Protestants or philosophers were banned and the cafes where they congregated were watched by plainclothes policemen. Cultural expression was controlled and any manifestations less than rigidly Catholic were outlawed, including the ancient Carnival. Conversely, Portuguese theatre was stimulated by the construction in 1793 of the Teatro de São Carlos in Chiado, which replaced the opera house destroyed during the earthquake. It was, however, funded by the private sector.

== Civil war: liberals and conservatives ==
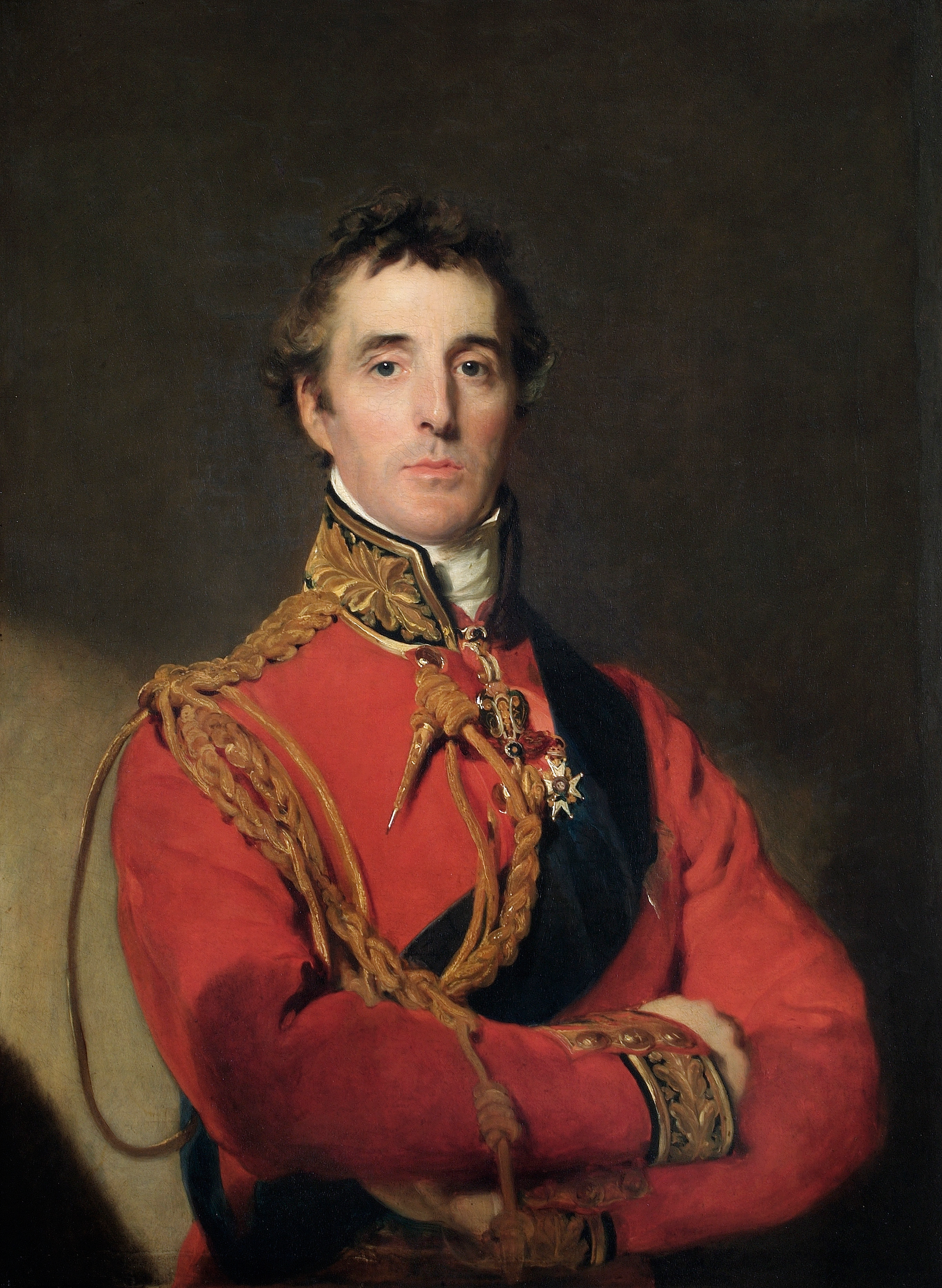
Sir Arthur Wellesley, 1st Duke of Wellington

In the last quarter of the 18th century, the American Revolution, begun in 1776, galvanised liberal ideas of government throughout Europe. When the French Revolution erupted in France in 1789, the liberal partisans of Lisbon rejoiced in the downfall of the French aristocracy. The revolutionary movement in Paris was quickly radicalised, however, when its leadership fell into the hands of the extreme left. The bourgeoisie felt threatened and called to power the politically centrist Napoleon Bonaparte, who eventually declared himself Emperor of France. The foreign policy he deployed in his struggle against Great Britain during the Napoleonic Wars is referred to as the Continental System or Continental Blockade (known in French as Blocus continental). After the French declaration of war against the United Kingdom in 1793, Portugal signed a treaty of mutual aid with Britain. As a response to the naval blockade of the French coasts enacted by the British government in 1806, Napoleon issued the Berlin Decree, which effected a large-scale embargo against British trade, which Portugal defied. After the Treaty of Tilsit was signed in July 1807, Napoleon attempted to capture the Portuguese fleet as well as members of the royal House of Braganza, and to occupy the Portuguese ports, but failed. The Portuguese population rose in revolt against the French invaders, causing Napoleon to send General Junot at the head of a large army to conquer the country. The prince regent of Portugal, later King John VI, who had formally governed the country on behalf of Maria I since 1799, took his fleet and transferred the Portuguese Court to Brazil with a British Royal Navy escort just before Napoleonic forces invaded Lisbon on 30 November 1807. Since Portugal was an ally of Great Britain, the British Army under Arthur Wellesley, future Duke of Wellington intervened, and the Peninsular War began.

When Junot entered Lisbon on 30 November 1807, the Portuguese royal family, aristocracy and high clergy had already set sail for Brazil the previous day. The French Army was initially well received by Lisboners, General Junot taking up residence in the Queluz National Palace (Palácio Nacional de Queluz). and redecorating it. The bourgeoisie of Lisbon discussed the new liberal ideas in conversations with French officers in the cafes of the city, particularly the Nicola in Rossio square, where the French established their headquarters. The people expected a continuation of the political reforms enacted by the Marquis of Pombal, but Junot did not want to risk stimulating radical ideas and did nothing along those lines. Napoleon proposed that Lisbon should be incorporated directly into the French Empire, while the old Portucale of northern Portugal would be resurrected as the 'Kingdom of Northern Lusitania' in the province of Entre Douro e Minho. Meanwhile, 50,000 Spanish and French troops roamed the countryside arresting, killing, plundering and raping the citizenry.

The lack of any movement by General Junot to enact reforms and the violent behavior of the French soldiers finally compelled the Junta Provisional do Supremo Governo do Reino (Provisional Board of the Supreme Government of the Kingdom) to seek the aid of England, which sent an expeditionary force led by Wellesley and William Beresford. The French were outnumbered, and Junot was forced to retreat in late 1808 following a withdrawal agreement with the British, who simultaneously entered the town and set up their headquarters in Arroios. The British received control of Lisbon's and Portugal's governments from Prince Regent John, who now resided in Rio de Janeiro, and administered them as virtual colonies of Great Britain. Lisbon suffered economically with the opening of the ports of Brazil to England. Following the French withdrawal, the Portuguese populace was free to avenge itself on their francophile compatriots for the brutality and depredations of the French.

Meanwhile, to control access to the capital, Wellington's chief engineer, Richard Fletcher, built the defensive lines known as the Lines of Torres Vedras across the peninsula on which Lisbon sits, using Portuguese workmen. Bounded by the Atlantic Ocean on one side and the Tagus on the other, the city was reachable only by a narrow stretch of land blocked by a range of hills stretching from Sintra to Torre Vedras, which since Roman times had marked the bounds of Lisbon's territory. Conceived by Fletcher and a Portuguese major, Neves Costa, the Lines proved impregnable to the French invasion force (Armée de Portugal) commanded by Marshal André Masséna, who withdrew in defeat in March 1811, after which the British and some Portuguese troops under General Wellington left Portugal to launch another offensive against the French army in Spain. This offensive culminated with a victory at Vittoria, effectively ending French control of Spain. Napoleon was finally defeated 18 June 1815 at Waterloo by a coalition of Britain, Prussia, Austria and Russia.

Beresford was made a Lieutenant-General in the British army and given command of the Portuguese army in 1809, with the rank of Marshal to bolster his authority over the Portuguese generals. He remained in the country long after the French withdrew in 1811, and, although he took his orders from King John, acted as a virtual dictator, becoming increasingly despotic after 1815, when Brazil was declared a kingdom.

A conspiracy against John and the Regency Council, organised by General Gomes Freire de Andrade, leader of the Portuguese partisans of France (Partido Francês), was discovered at Lisbon in May 1817; on the orders of Marshal Beresford, the principals were promptly arrested and tried. The object of the conspirators was to overthrow the British, to put Beresford to death, and to set up a revolutionary government. Gomes Freire, formerly commander of the Portuguese Legion in Napoleon's army, was sentenced to death with eleven of his accomplices, and on 18 October 1817 they were executed. He and seven others were hanged, their bodies burnt, and their ashes thrown into the Tagus.

The bourgeoisie of Lisbon chafed under the British occupation; in 1820 the Liberals of Porto rebelled and took control of the city, followed by a coup d'état in Lisbon and the expulsion of the British governors. The Cortes were then convoked by the Liberals, one of them enacting the Constitution of 1822 (actually written in 1820)," a charter of human rights that ended the privileges of the clergy and the nobility.

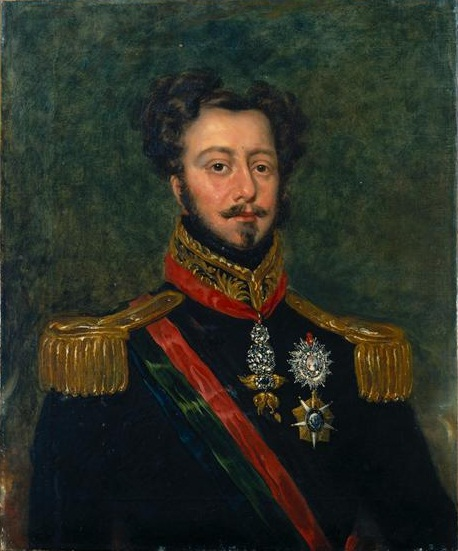
Pedro IV of Portugal

The years of political struggle between the conservative authoritarian absolutists and the progressive constitutionalist Liberals over the issue of royal succession, lasting from 1828 to 1834, was a complex period in Lisbon's history. In 1828, Prince Michael, whom the absolutists wanted to rule Portugal as an absolute monarch, returned from exile in Vienna. Conservative politicians, clergymen and aristocratic supporters of Queen Carlota manipulated political developments and proclaimed him king, starting a civil war against the forces of the Liberal constitutionalists who supported his brother, Emperor Peter I of Brazil. Peter's forces won the war in 1834 and he became Pedro IV of Portugal, but the new Constitution as promulgated was more conservative than expected by the people. However, it did present some liberal reforms, such as restoration of freedom of the press, mandatory education, abolishment of the slave trade in the African colonies, extinction of the religious orders and confiscation of their convents, as well as the expropriation of many other properties of the Catholic Church, which had supported the Miguelists. The Liberals of Lisbon soon became disillusioned with Pedro and formed new political conspiracies. On 9 September 1836, the politicised population, many of them petty bourgeois and literary intellectuals, joined with the National Guard to drive the Cartistas (Chartists) from power and forced Queen Maria II to reinstate the 1822 Constitution. Members of the government installed following this revolution were called Setembristas, after their short-lived movement, the Setembrismo, which was launched in September. The absolutists attempted a coup in 1836, and again in 1837. The country was divided into two opposing radical groups that refused to engage in a dialogue. Seeing opportunity in this chaotic state of affairs, the great northern European powers planned the division of its provinces and colonies.

The period of Liberal government (1820–1842) was marked by wars and guerrilla actions, but even so, many reforms and public works projects were introduced. The long-planned project to provide lighting in the city was finally implemented; and introduced in many private homes of the bourgeoisie between the years 1823 and 1837. Initially, lamps were lit by olive oil, and later fish oil, then were replaced by gas lamps in 1848. A new network of roads was constructed; and a line of steamships went into service linking Lisbon to Porto by sea. Plans were made to launch the construction of railways, but the war with the Conservatives made this impossible, and the first railroad line in Portugal, the Caminhos de Ferro Portugueses, between Lisbon and Carregado, would not open until 1856.

This period was marked by a partial loss of Lisbon's economic vitality when Brazil became independent and its gold and other products no longer flowed into the capital. During the Cabralismo, the period from 1842 to 1846 when António Bernardo da Costa Cabral dominated Portuguese politics, noble titles were assigned to many of the more important bourgeoisie, as a compromise with the Conservative Party that had some success. With the loss of earnings from Brazil, dependence on the state became attractive for the leisure class, who feared competition from the neo-aristocrats and supported traditionally rigid social divisions. It was at this time that titles of 'Baron' and 'Viscount' multiplied among the landed property owners, many of them hereditary, but many others being limited to the life of the beneficiary receiving rents from the state or engaged in the corrupt politics of the time. The territorial aristocracy acquired the habit of spending the winters in Lisbon, staying in their manor houses (solars) only in summer. However, it was the common people who suffered most from the wars and the loss of Brazil, as the city's economy stagnated and it lost its international influence, going from the fifth most populous city in Europe to the tenth and continuing downward. Employment opportunities became more precarious and poverty again increased.

== Lisbon between Europe and Africa ==
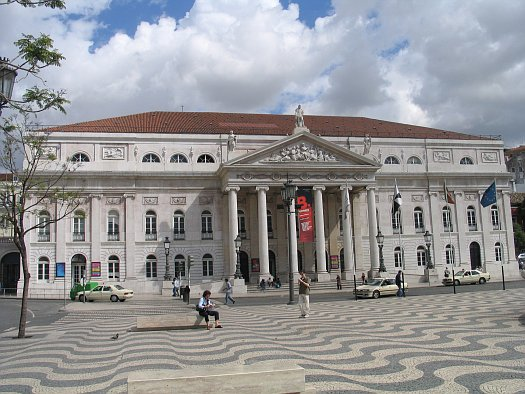
The D. Maria II National Theatre

Following the end of the wars and conflicts between absolutist conservatives and liberals, Lisbon was in a declining economic situation, having lost the gold and commodities monopoly of Brazil, the source of most of its wealth since the end of the 16th century. The northern European nations had prospered through industrialisation, and become rich through trade in the Americas (Great Britain would dominate the Brazilian market) and Asia. Portugal's downturn seemed irreversible.

Unable to decisively defeat the Liberals, and frightened by the economic downturn that conservative policies had led Portugal into since the 16th century, in contrast to the success of liberal England, France and the Netherlands, the absolutists who dominated the country and the capital partially relented. Limited reforms would be allowed in exchange for defending the conservative and religious values of a mostly rural population, with political power remaining in the hands of the large landowners. Elections would be held, but only those qualified by ownership of substantial property would be allowed to vote. The patronage of the state would be shared with the neo-aristocrats and titles granted to the large bourgeoisie and capitalists. The ruling classes would retain their privileges and subsidies from the state, and industrialisation would be limited to their interests.

In this period Lisbon was a poor and dirty city compared to the cities of northern Europe. Almost all its commercial importance derived from the monopoly it held on the products of the Portuguese colonies, especially Angola and Mozambique. The country itself was described in London, Paris and Berlin as an extension of North Africa, meaning a territory unable to govern itself. The first large-scale emigrations began, and many thousands of poor Lisbons departed for Brazil, not to take government administrative jobs, but rather to rise from the lower levels of the Portuguese social scale: Despite the poverty and backwardness of most of the country, a rich upper class rose in Lisbon which spent lavishly and behaved as if it belonged to the elite of northern Europe, while governing a rural and backward country crippled by economic protectionism, and lacking systems to provide state-funded education and health care. With the decreasing importance of land as a factor of wealth, the landed aristocracy and gentry orbited the royal court, living luxuriously on allowances and salaries distributed by the state using taxes collected from the middle and lower classes. A regime "of genteel manners" was established which ceased political persecution, but also halted any reforms; corruption was routine and almost always went unpunished. Occasionally, an exceptional politician who was amenable to change and willing to invest time and effort to bring it about would appear in the succession of mostly idle and corrupt administrators. The Prime Minister Fontes Pereira de Melo reacted against protectionism and fought for economic liberalisation and expanded industrialisation; various economic and industrial developments were encouraged under his leadership, which was focused primarily on the development of infrastructure.

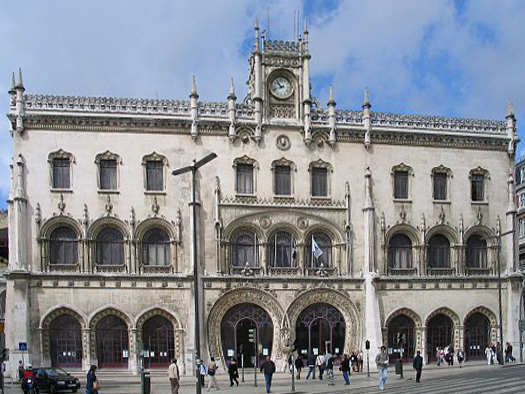
Neo-Manueline façade of Rossio Railway Station in Lisbon

A railway line connecting Lisbon to Porto and intervening cities was constructed, with two new train stations: Santa Apolónia and Rossio. Electric lighting was introduced as a public utility in 1878, replacing gas lighting. The first master plans of urban development were drawn up.in response to the need to reverse the city's reputation as a dirty, backward capital that shocked visitors from northern Europe. Its inhabitants were encouraged to use the decorative ceramic tiles called azulejos on the exteriors of their houses and to paint the facades pink, according to municipal guidelines (the numerous buildings with decorated tiles of this period dominate the city centre today). The first plumbing systems were installed and sewage and water treatment plants built in response to the cholera epidemics that killed thousands. Using the labour of the impoverished working class, it was now possible to pave both the new and the old streets (as well as Rossio Square) as had been done on a smaller scale in the 16th century, with the centuries-old traditional technique, known as calçada, of laying cobblestones. Other important innovations were the American street cars (passenger vehicles on rails pulled by horses), introduced in 1873; they were replaced in 1901 by electric trams, which still exist today, and the funiculars and cable cars that were installed on several of the ciiy's hills after 1880.

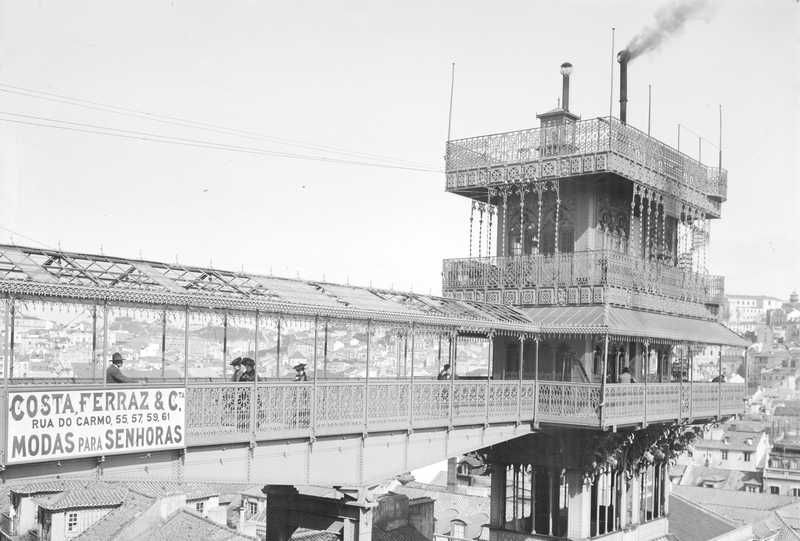
A photograph of the Santa Justa Lift, as it appeared prior to a 1907 conversion to electric power.

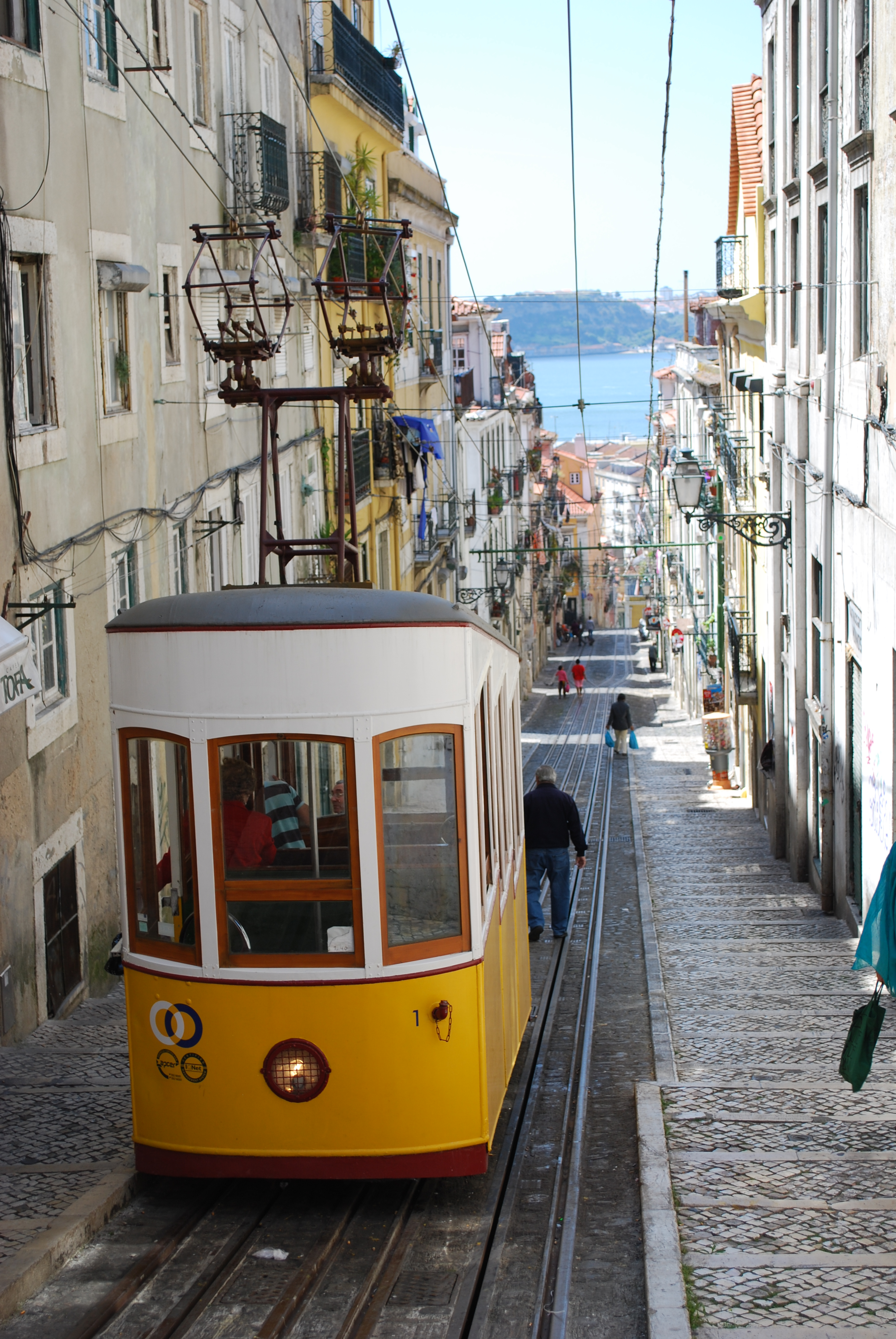
Elevador da Bica, The Bica funicular was opened on 28 June 1892

The cultural and commercial centre of the city moved to the Chiado. With the old streets of the Baixa already occupied, the owners of new stores and clubs established their businesses in the newly annexed hillside neighbourhood, which was rapidly developed. Clubs founded there included institutions like the Grémio Literário (Literary Guild), founded by the writers Almeida Garrett and Alexandre Herculano and described in the famous stories of Eca de Queiroz. Its elegant salons were frequented by Garrett and Herculano, as well as Ramalho Ortigão, Guerra Junqueiro, and Pedro de Oliveira Martins, among others. Clothing stores carried the latest Paris fashions and other luxury products, and department stores were built and set up in the style of Harrods of London or the Galeries Lafayette in Paris, as well as new Luso-Italian cafes like Tavares and Cafe Chiado.

Buildings rose and roads were constructed in the new neighbourhoods north of Lisbon, works initiated by the city council with the support of the bourgeoisie. In 1878 the public promenade was demolished; it was replaced in 1886 by the Avenida da Liberdade (Liberty Avenue), designed by Ressano Garcia to be the central urban axis of the city, connecting the Baixa with the newly developed areas of the city and extending into agricultural land in anticipation of further urban expansion. At the head of the avenue was constructed Marquis of Pombal Square (Praça do Marquês de Pombal), the new geographical centre of Lisbon, from which radiated the newly built avenues of Lisbon. The upper class of Lisbon built palaces on these thoroughfares; the most important was the Avenida Fontes Pereira de Melo, running northeast and ending in the new Praça Duque de Saldanha, whence it became a part of another great avenue, today República but initially Ressano Garcia. In the vicinity was the Campo Grande (then an open field and not a Garden) and the new Campo Pequeno bullring, completed in 1892 in a Moorish Revival architectural style. New neighbourhoods were built nearby on plans similar to that of the Baixa, including Campo de Ourique to the west, and Estefânia to the east. Adjacent to the Estefânia neighbourhood was the grand new avenue Avenida Rainha Dona Amélia (now rebuilt as Avenida Almirante Reis), linking it to the plaza at Martim Moniz. All these new developments transformed the city. The lower middle class and the common people settled in the eastern side of the city, while the upper middle classes and the wealthy bourgeoisie moved to the western side, with the Baixa being the location of the larger retail establishments.

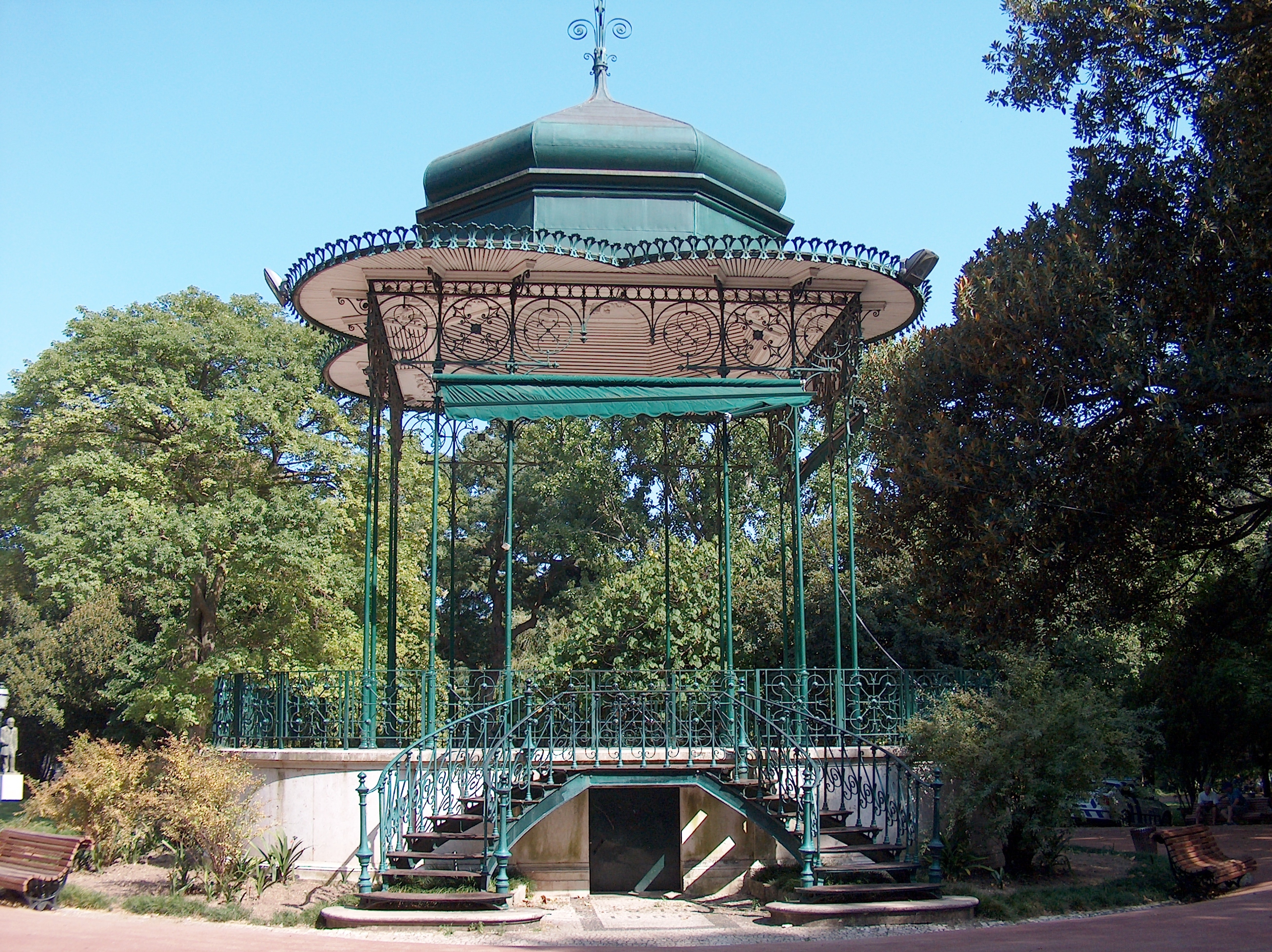
Bandstand in the Jardim da Estrela

In the cultural realm, this was the period when bullfighting and fado became popular entertainments, soon joined by the popular theatre and theatrical revues (imported from Paris) which, along with classical comedies and dramas, competed with the new theatres of the capital. A typically Portuguese entertainment of the time was the oratory, a competition in which actors corrupted the old art of António Vieira, vying for prizes in the performance of florid and usually superficial arguments in song. The first large public gardens were created around this time, imitating Hyde Park in London and the gardens of German cities; the first was the Jardim da Estrela (located opposite the Basilica da Estrela), where the Lisbon bourgeois resorted on the weekends.

Socially, the upper classes of Lisbon were now a mix of conservative nobles who were forced to accept, albeit reluctantly, some liberal ideas, and the newly entitled bourgeois who held many conservative ideas. They were joined by the Brazilians, many of them formerly poor and uneducated immigrants who had immigrated to Brazil and grown rich, then returned to the city, eager to find acceptance in higher social circles. Lisbon was the industrial centre of the country, despite its industrialisation being minimal compared to that of England or Germany. The poorer strata of Lisbon society grew exponentially with the arrival of the first workers to man the new factories. They often lived in miserable slums, amidst raging epidemics of cholera and other diseases, working all day just to have enough to eat.

Prior liberal governments had betrayed the middle class, whose taxes paid for the luxuries of the leisure classes, but they, receiving nothing in return, were invigorated by a new, more radical liberal movement, which threatened not only the old landowners but also the new capitalist barons and viscounts who depended on the largesse of the state.

An alliance between the most educated workers and the middle class was borne of the new radical liberalism, better known as Republicanism because of its opposition to the alliance of former liberals who now depended on the monarchist state (the newly entitled bourgeois) and the conservative monarchists of the old aristocracy, as well as large capitalists, landowners and dependents of the royal court.

== 1910 Revolution ==
The colors of the Republican Party inspired the flag of Portugal

With the emergence of a compromise government between the more right wing Liberals and the more moderate conservatives, as manifested in the constitutional monarchy, the lack of development and further notable reforms in the country led the more left wing Liberal party, made up mostly of middle class partisans, to reformulate its policy objectives. Thus was born a Republican Party that advocated radical liberal reforms such as universal suffrage, the end of the privileges of the Catholic Church and rents given to the nobles, and above all, the overthrow of a political elite discredited by its corruption and incompetence. The country went into debt and was increasingly dependent on the northern provinces of the country. The humiliation of submitting to the ultimatum of 11 January 1890 issued by Great Britain, an allied nation, was undoubtedly a cathartic episode. Britain demanded that Portugal surrender what are now Zambia and Zimbabwe and abandon its plans to acquire lands in this part of Africa that it needed to connect Angola and Mozambique.

The conditions that made possible the Republican rise to power were above all economic. In the last quarter of the 19th century, a slow but vigorous industrialisation began in Portugal, concentrated in Lisbon and Porto. Although the people of the country remained mostly rural and Catholic, reflexively supporting the king and the Church, a new social class made up of industrial workers formed in Lisbon (and to a lesser extent in Porto and Beira) who shared most of the progressives' ideas. The manufacture of tobacco products and matches were the major industries in Lisbon at the time, but there were also textile, glass, rubber and canning factories, among many others. In total, at the end of the 19th century there would be tens of thousands of workers in various industries out of a total population of over 300,000 people. The first "industrial zones" of Lisbon were established in the Alcántara, Bom Sucesso and Santo Amaro neighbourhoods, thanks to the production of electricity coming from the Tejo Power Station in Belém. Living conditions for the new working class in Lisbon were miserable. Coming in large numbers from rural areas, they lived in tin shanties in large neighbourhoods with no infrastructure on the outskirts of town, their children often working long hours in the factories. Others came in large groups from the same village, and settled in abandoned lots, tents, and pátios in the former parish of Graça, located at the top of the Castelo hill and known for its courtyards. The first workers' districts appeared at this time, with dwellings built at minimal cost by entrepreneurs to attract the workforce. As the working poor struggled under deteriorating economic conditions and falling wages, the nation came increasingly under the control of an oligarchy of the rich.

The first trade unions were organised at this time, many of which were affiliated with anarchists. Instead of joining the new Marxist party as elsewhere in Europe, other workers gathered around the middle and professional classes of the Republican Party, and supported their candidates in the elections of 1899 and 1900. As a result, the party, very weak in the north of the country, with the exception of Porto, gained increasing influence in the capital. Despite championing property rights and the free market, the Republicans promised to improve working conditions and pass social measures. However, the upper classes still lived in a society apart, unable to respond to the new political environment except with repression. The result was increasingly violent actions among the populace.

Facing republican dissent, Prime Minister João Franco dissolved the Câmara dos Deputados (Chamber of Deputies) and established an authoritarian government in 1907 with the backing of the elite. He was still in office when the king of Portugal, Carlos I, and his son and heir to the throne, Luis Filipe, were killed in the Terreiro do Paço on 1 February 1908 by assassins sympathetic to republican interests and aided by elements within the Portuguese Carbonária, disenchanted politicians and anti-monarchists. In 1909 the workers of Lisbon organised extensive strikes, and in 1910 Lisbon finally revolted. The population formed barricades in the streets and guns were distributed. Ordered to suppress the revolution, the army was decimated by defections. On 5 October of the same year the armed forces deposed the monarchy, ending the government's subordination to the interests of Great Britain. The rest of the country, although still deeply rural, Catholic and conservative, followed the capital's lead and accepted the republican regime, and the First Republic was proclaimed.

The writer and politician Teófilo Braga was acclaimed President of the Provisional Government of the Portuguese Republic and led the government until approval of the Constitution in 1911, which marked the beginning of the First Republic. The old Republican Party would not survive the creation of the Republic, factions quickly developing between groups within the party to form new organizations. Liberal measures were enacted in 1911 with the passage of the "Separation Act", or Lei de Separação da Igreja do Estado (Law on the Separation of Church and State), including the right to divorce and the right to strike, as well as social support for workers implemented by creation of the welfare state (Estado Providência). Subsequently, the tax structure was modified from a model based on contributions from workers and the middle classes to one that taxed the rich more heavily. The privileges of the nobility and the Church were rescinded, while religious orders were again expelled and some of their property seized by the state.

== First Republic ==
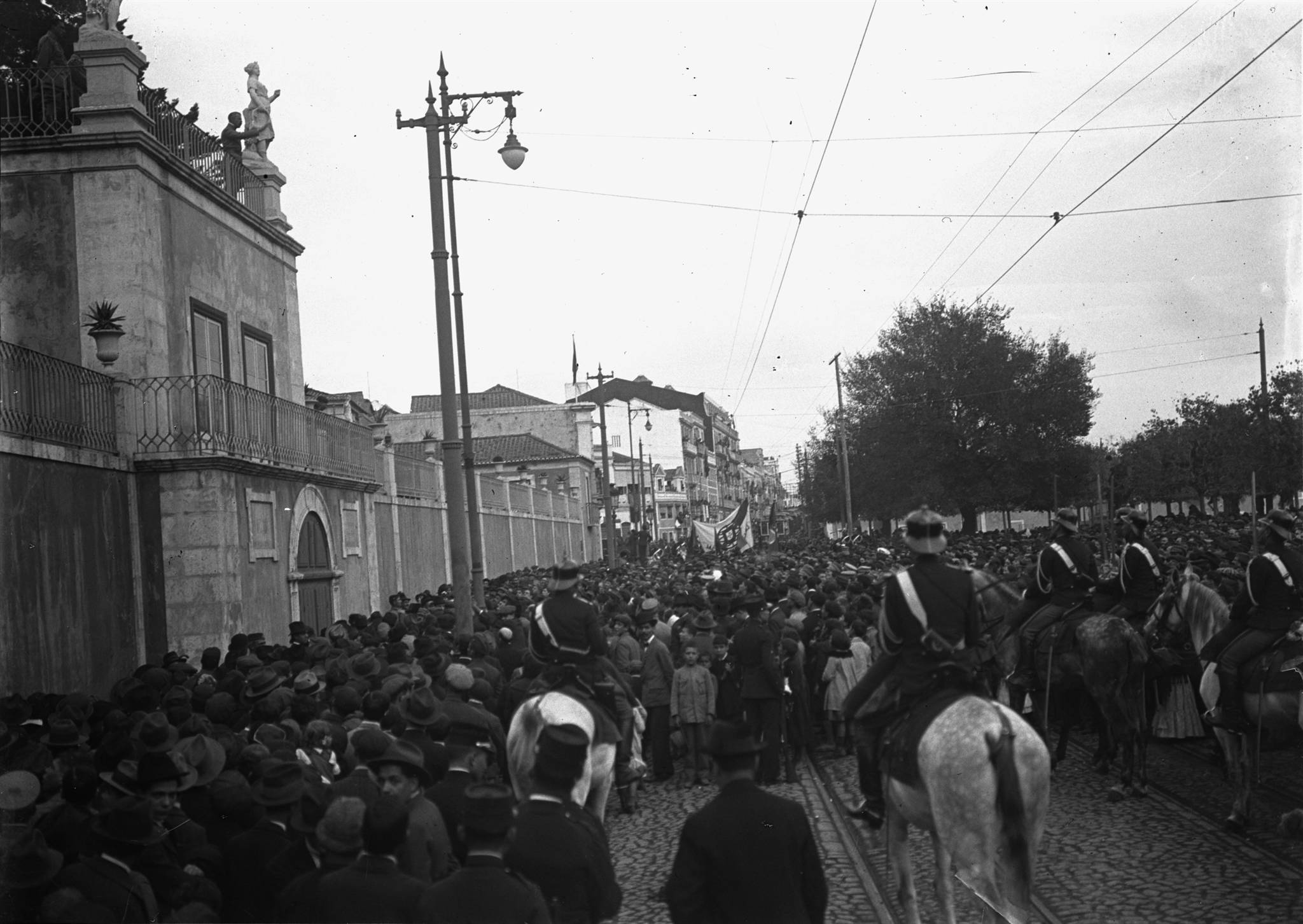
Sidónio Pais reads a telegram from the British king, George V, congratulating Portugal for its contribution to the allied victory in World War I – 1918

On 5 October 1910, Portugal became a republic, ending a monarchy that had endured since the 12th century. The period of the First Portuguese Republic (1910–1926) was marked by strife and political violence in Lisbon: under a little less than 16 years of republican government, there would be 45 changes of government. Although the political environment was tense across Europe, with terrorist attacks and riots in even the most developed countries, the situation was more critical in Portugal, with economic and financial havoc. This was a time of upheavals, locally and nationally. The old Republican Party would not survive the creation of the Republic; factions quickly developed between groups within the party and formed new organizations. There was a succession of general strikes (now legal), demonstrations, gunfire exchanges, and even bombings in the streets of Lisbon; the Republican political class was divided on how to handle the situation. In 1912 the monarchists exploited discontent with liberal laws imposed by the Republicans in the north, and launched a coup that failed. In 1916, after Portugal interned German ships in Lisbon, Germany declared war on Portugal.

In 1918 the Spanish flu descended on the city, killing many thousands and worsening the situation of the workers, who then revolted several times. Sidónio Pais, the military leader and politician was murdered in central Lisbon on 14 December 1918.

As the city's population grew during this period, it continued to expand northward into the broad expanse above Pombal Square and Edward VII Park known as “Avenidas Novas", which became the heart of the fashionable part of Lisbon, where the nouveau riche upper middle class built its grand new residences. This growth was part of the vision of engineer Frederico Ressano Garcia, with wide streets having tree-lined walkways in the middle, although the street grid was laid out unevenly as the area developed. The façades of the multi-story mansard-roofed buildings were topped by sculptures and painted in the traditional residential colors of the city: yellow, pink and light blue, presenting a characteristic appearance that remains its most visible face. Nearly all of them were built by speculators and small contractors, mostly originating from the city of Tomar, and known colloquially as patos bravos (wild ducks). Some of the new buildings were constructed in haste with little concern for safety, leading to several landslides and fatal accidents in the following years.

The First Republic ended in 1926, well into the 20th century, when the anti-democratic conservative right (still led for the most part by the descendants of the old nobility in northern Portugal and the Catholic Church) finally took power after two attempts in 1925, leading eventually to the development of a new ideology and authoritarian government under the leadership of António de Oliveira Salazar. This was the beginning of the Estado Novo, centred in Lisbon.

== Second Republic, or New State ==
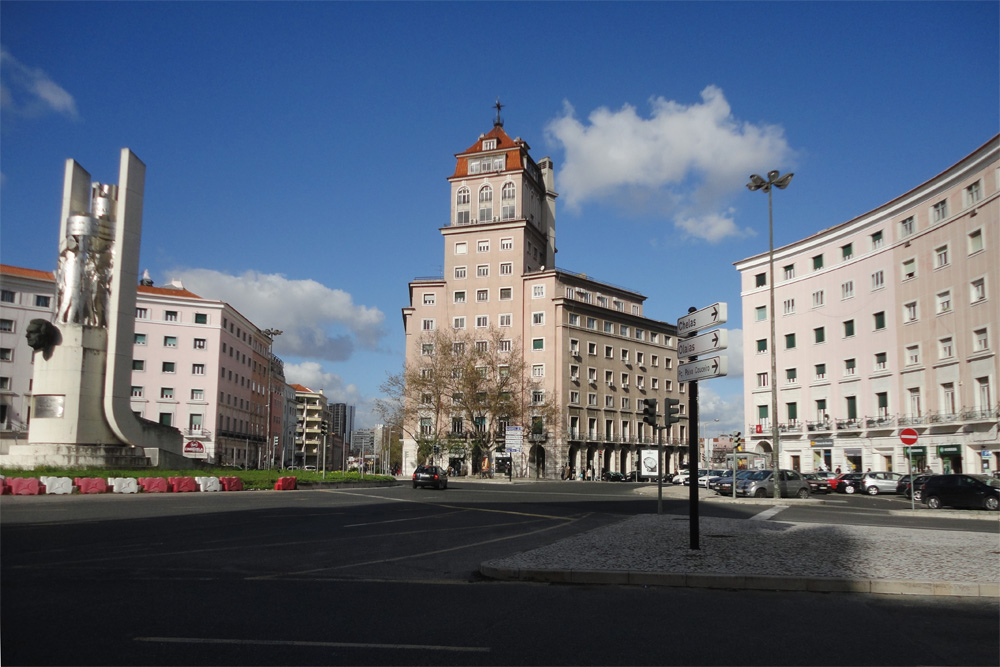
Praça do Areeiro

The New State (Estado Novo) was the corporatist authoritarian regime installed in Portugal in 1933. It evolved from the Ditadura Nacional formed after the coup d'état of 28 May 1926 against the unstable democratic First Republic. Together, the Ditadura Nacional and the Estado Novo encompass the historical period of the Portuguese Second Republic. The New State, inspired by conservative and authoritarian ideologies; was developed by António de Oliveira Salazar, who ruled Portugal as a dictator from 1932 until 1968, when he had a stroke and was replaced by Marcelo Caetano. The regime was staunchly conservative and nationalistic, opposing communism, socialism, anarchism, liberalism and anti-colonialism.

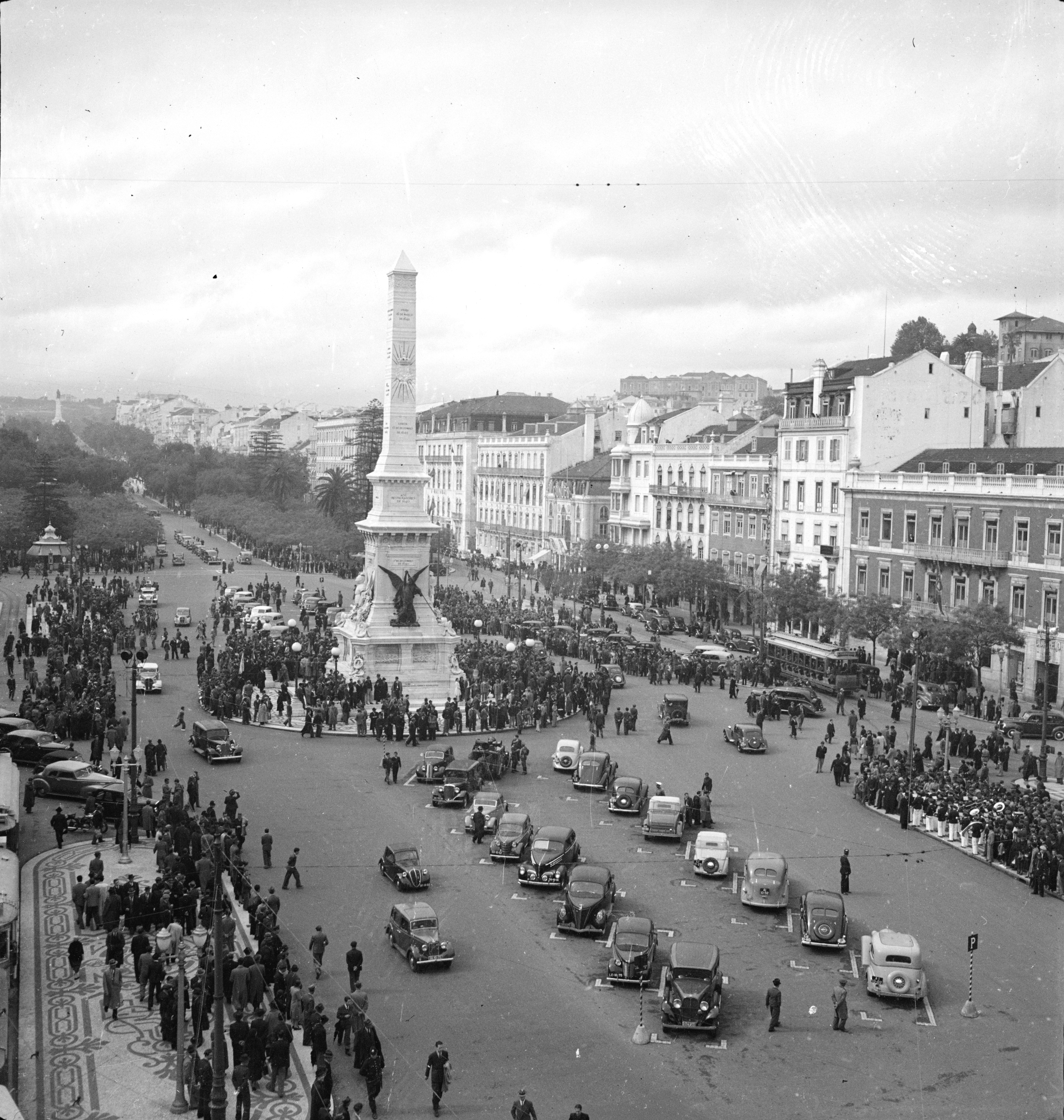
Lisbon in May 1941

In the 1930s, Duarte Pacheco (1900–1943), first as Public Works minister and later as Mayor of Lisbon, was responsible for a redefinition of the city's urban area by an innovative concerted action of legislation, architecture and urbanisation. In 1933, Pacheco invited the French urban architect, Alfred Agache (1875–1959), to draw up an urbanization plan from Terreiro do Paço to Cascais. 24 July 1933 issue of the newspaper, Diário de Lisboa, announced: “We Will Modernise the Capital! The French architect Agache came to Lisbon to study the construction of a highway from Lisbon to Cascais". This was to be a panoramic coastal road designed to accentuate the Portuguese capital's spectacular location, emphasising its proximity to the sea and associated entertainment and touristic activities, as well as sunbathing areas and thermal spas of cosmopolitan character. Lisbon would be connected to "The Costa do Sol", a tourist resort with the Palace Hotel and the International Casino, where facilities for golf, horse-riding and horse racing, polo, auto racing, fencing, pigeon shooting and beach sports were available.

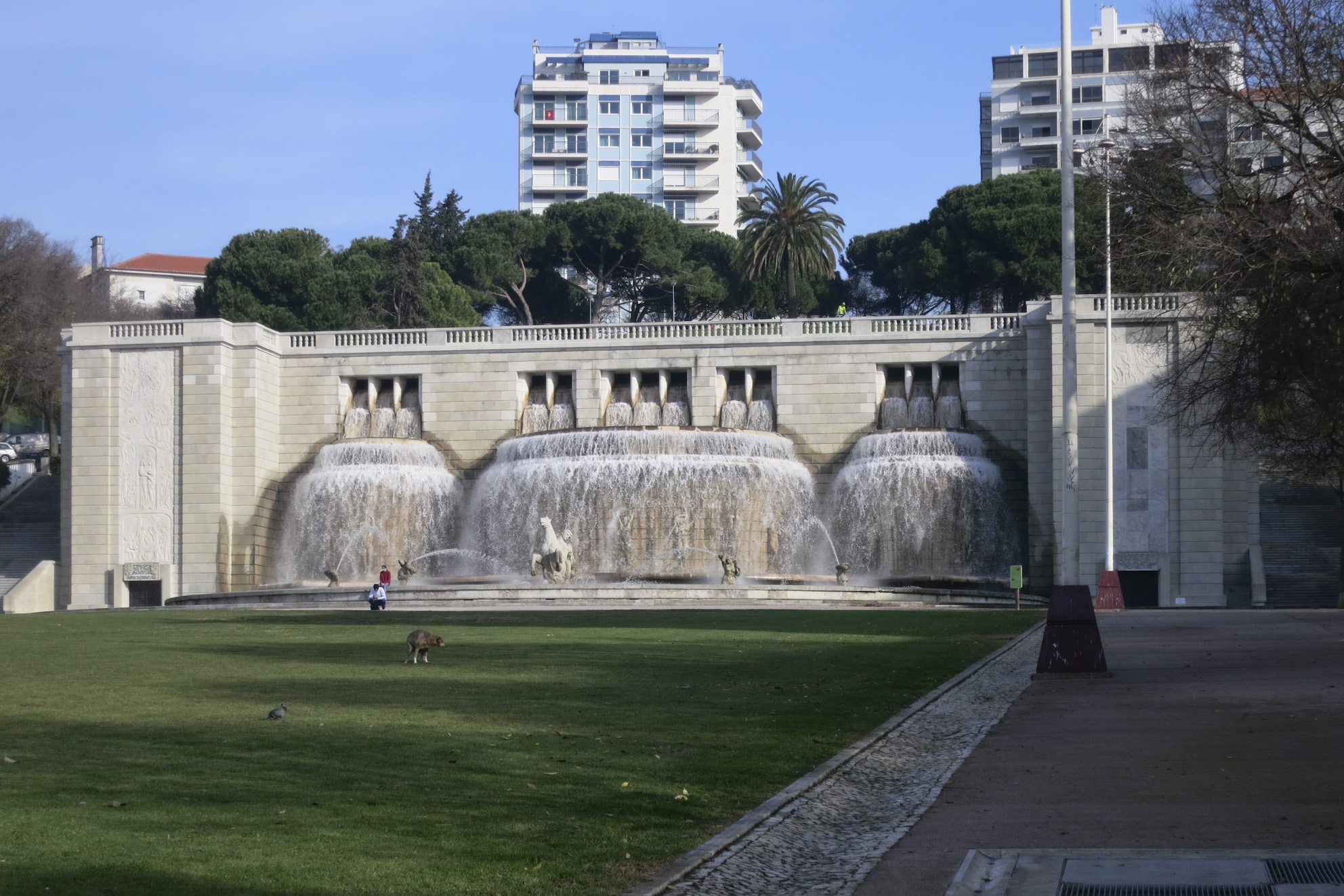
Alameda D. Afonso Henriques

In 1938, Duarte Pacheco was appointed mayor of the Lisbon City Council. Under his administration, significant changes were made in town planning policies, including new ordinances to facilitate land appropriation. Pacheco invited Étienne de Groër to work on a master plan for Lisbon between 1938 and 1948. It was de Groër who planned the renovation of the Baixa and whose actions resulted in: the building of the University Campus of the Instituto Superior Técnico (IST) by the architect Porfírio Pardal Monteiro (1897–1957), the design of an integrated development of the city, the finalisation of the Bairro do Arco do Cego (the precursor of social housing in Lisbon), the widening of the Alameda D. Afonso Henriques, completion of the Luminosa fountain, the building of the National Institute of Statistics, the villas of the Avenida México and finally the steering of new development in the city to the north.

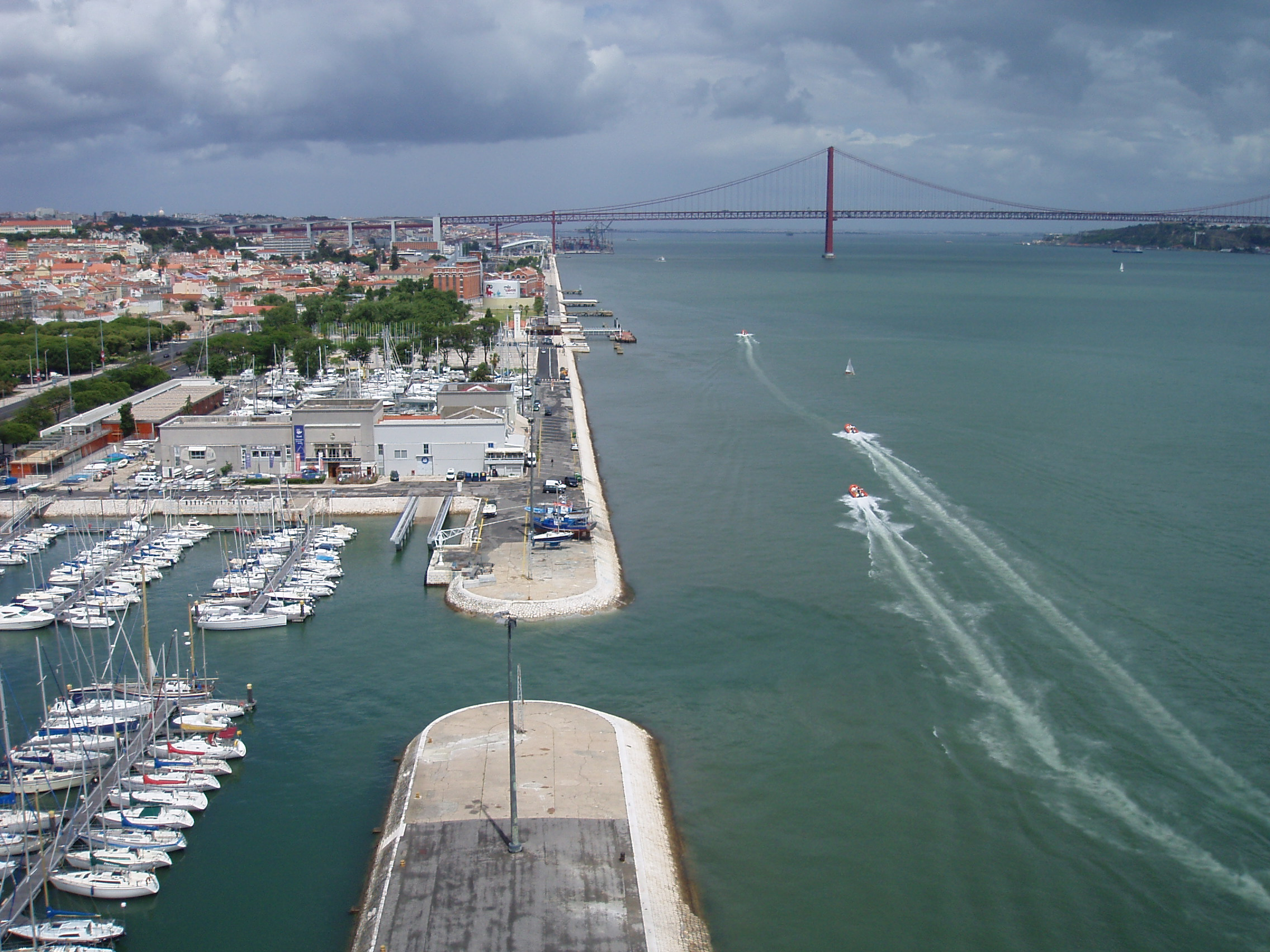
The Lisbon Marina

In 1940 Lisbon hosted The Portuguese World Exhibition (Exposição do Mundo Português). The double centenary, celebrated with the Exposição do Mundo Português (Portuguese World Exhibition) held between June and December 1940, was the first major cultural event of the Estado Novo (New State) dictatorship and marked the high-point of its "nationalist-imperialist" propaganda. Staged to commemorate the foundation of the nation in 1140 and the regaining of its independence from Spain in 1640, the Exhibition became a vehicle for the diffusion and legitimisation of the dictatorship's ideology and values in which the idea of the nation was (re)constructed through a series of carefully planned images, myths and symbols. The World Exhibition of Lisbon attracted over 3 million visitors. The site of the trade fair was located between the northern bank of the river Tagus and the Jeronimos Monastery. Today this area covers the Belem Cultural Centre and the gardens directly in front of the Jeronimos Monastery. The marina of Lisbon was constructed expressly for the fair.

Despite the preparations for the 1940 Portuguese World Exhibition, Lisbon was the stage of an unusual movement: as the crossroads of the circulation of refugees from World War II, Lisbon was an important meeting place for spies from both sides, given the neutral character of the country. "In 1940 Lisbon, happiness was staged so that God could believe it still existed," wrote the French writer Antoine de Saint-Exupéry. During World War II, Saint-Exupery escaped from France to Portugal and ended up in Lisbon, waiting for a visa to go to America. He was not the only one; the Portuguese capital became a symbol of hope for many refugees. Even Ilsa and Rick, the star-crossed lovers in the film Casablanca, sought a ticket to that "great embarkation point." Thousands had flooded the city, trying to obtain the documents necessary to escape to the United States or Palestine. On 26 June the main HIAS-HICEM (Jewish relief organization) European Office was authorised by the Portuguese Government to be transferred from Paris to Lisbon.

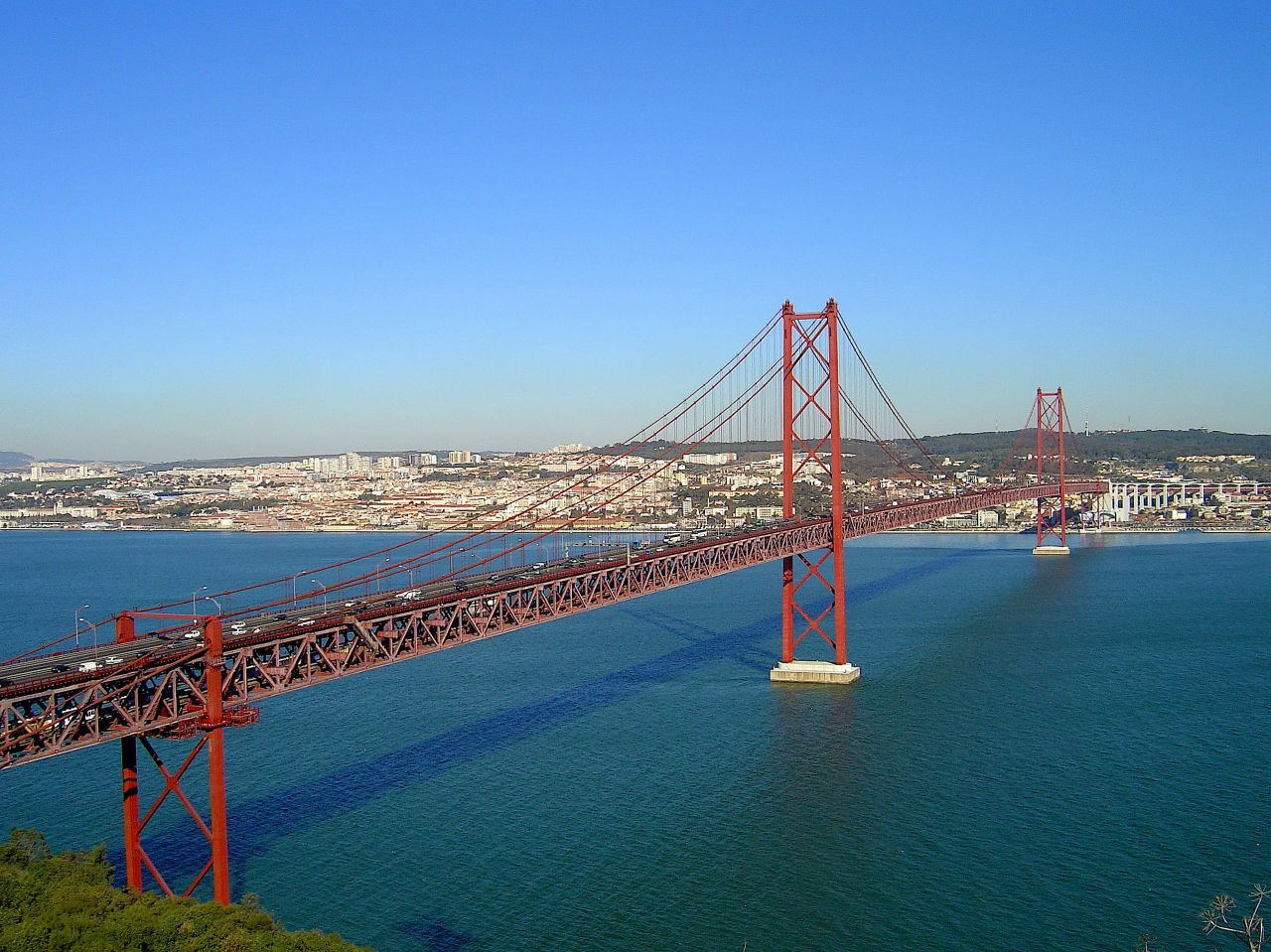
The bridge was originally named the Salazar Bridge (Ponte Salazar), in honor of the Prime Minister

In 1956, the Portuguese Ambassador to the United Kingdom, Dr Pedro Theotonio Pereira, and Bernard Morgan, a retired solicitor from London, organised the first Tall Ships' Race a race of 20 of the world's remaining large sailing ships. The race was from Torquay, Devon, to Lisbon, and was meant to be a last farewell to the era of the great sailing ships. Public interest was so intense, however, that race organisers founded the Sail Training International Association to direct the planning of future events. Since then Tall Ships' Races have occurred annually in various parts of the world, with millions of spectators.

On 6 August 1966, a suspension bridge connecting Lisbon to the municipality of Almada on the left (south) bank of the Tejo river was inaugurated. Because it is a suspension bridge and has similar colouring, it is often compared to the Golden Gate Bridge in San Francisco, United States. The bridge also allowed Lisbon inhabitants direct egress to escape the hassle and the heat of Lisbon on a hot summer day and enjoy the beaches of Costa da Caparica, a continuous 30 km stretch of golden sands, a suitable alternative to the Cascais/Estoril coast.

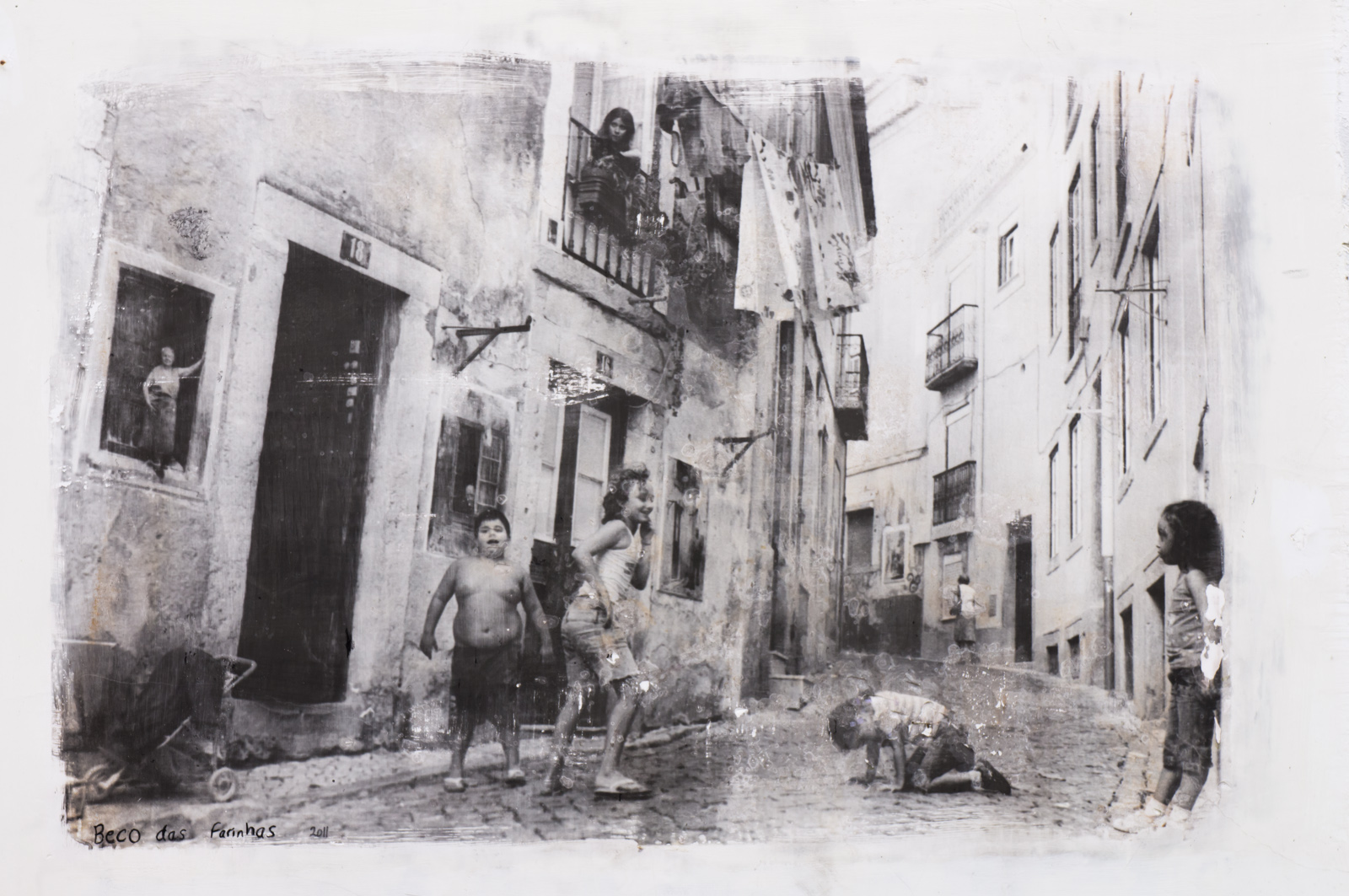
Trigueirinhas of Mouraria

Urban renewal projects initiated by the Estado Novo razed much of the Mouraria neighbourhood in the 1930s through the 1970s, thus eradicating a considerable amount of the last physical remnants of Moorish Lisbon, the loss of which has become a subject of lament in Lisbon fado. In the later years of the Estado Novo's rule, the city had a population boom, driven by economic development and industrial progress. During the 1950s and especially the 1960s, there was a large-scale rural exodus from the provinces to the capital. Surrounding areas were filled with peasants uprooted from farms and dwelling in squalid neighbourhoods. The largest and best known of these was the Brandoa. From the 1960s onward, government policy was influenced by the technocratic faction in the regime which advocated modernisation projects including expansion of the educational system and industrialisation, leading to a fast-growing national economy with increases in general standards of living and quality of life in the city. Although it is generally agreed that the republic accomplished several notable social and economic achievements, including major improvements in public health and education levels in the period between the end of the Second World War and the 1974 revolution, the Estado Novo was finally deposed by the Carnation Revolution (Revolução dos Cravos), launched in Lisbon with a military coup on 25 April 1974. The movement was joined by a popular campaign of civil resistance, leading to the fall of the Estado Novo, the restoration of democracy, and the withdrawal of Portugal from its African colonies and East Timor. The strain of waging the Portuguese Colonial War had overextended and weakened the Portuguese dictatorship, leading to the overthrow of Caetano's regime. Younger military officers, disillusioned by a far-off and taxing war, began to side with the pro-independence resistance against Portugal and eventually led the military coup in Lisbon, ending a dictatorship that had been in power since 1933.

== Third Republic ==
The Carnation revolution of 1974, effectively a bloodless left-wing military coup, installed the Third Republic, and broad democratic reforms were implemented in the country's government. With Portugal's admission to the European Union in 1986, plans to rehouse the huge population living in deprived areas of the city emerged. There are now fewer slums in the capital and its environs, although there are serious problems in those that remain. But even these, such as Mouraria, have seen changes. In 1988, a fire near the historical centre of Chiado greatly disrupted normal life in the area for about 10 years. Another boost to Lisbon's international standing was Expo 98 which opened up a new space in the capital, the Parque das Nações (Park of Nations).

Expo '98 (1998 Lisbon World Exposition), held to coincide with the commemoration of the 500th anniversary of Vasco da Gama's voyage to India, was exploited by the Portuguese government to perform a thorough renovation of the city. Construction of the Vasco da Gama Bridge, the longest bridge in Europe (including viaducts), with a total length of 17.2 kilometres (10.7 mi), had begun in February 1995, and it opened to traffic on 29 March 1998, just in time for the fair. The Exposition's theme was 'The Oceans, a Heritage for the Future'; around 11 million visitors attended in 132 days, with 155 countries and organizations represented. Expo '98 shut down on 30 September 1998, and the site remained closed until February 1999, when it reopened as Parque das Nações (Park of the Nations), a free-access park, keeping the gardens, Oceanarium (Europe's then largest aquarium), observation tower, funicular, and the Virtual Reality pavilion. The area thrives today, attracting 18 million tourists a year to its gardens, museums, commercial areas and modern buildings. It has also become a permanent residential area for up to 25,000 people and one of Lisbon's premier business centres, with many multinational corporations having their headquarters in its main avenue.

The city has also hosted meetings of the Ibero-American Summit as well as of the Portuguese-speaking African countries, or PALOP, (Países Africanos de Língua Oficial Portuguesa). The real impetus to Lisbon's modernization came when Portugal joined the European Union (EU). The city received significant funds for land redevelopment and urban renewal, and was chosen the European Capital of Culture in 1994. The Lisbon Strategy was an agreement between the EU nations based on measures to improve the European economy, signed in the city in March 2000. Sessions of the European Council were held in Lisbon in which the ministerial meetings and the agreements to be worked out between members of the European Community, known as the Bologna Process, were approved, having been first proposed in the Italian city.

== 21st century ==
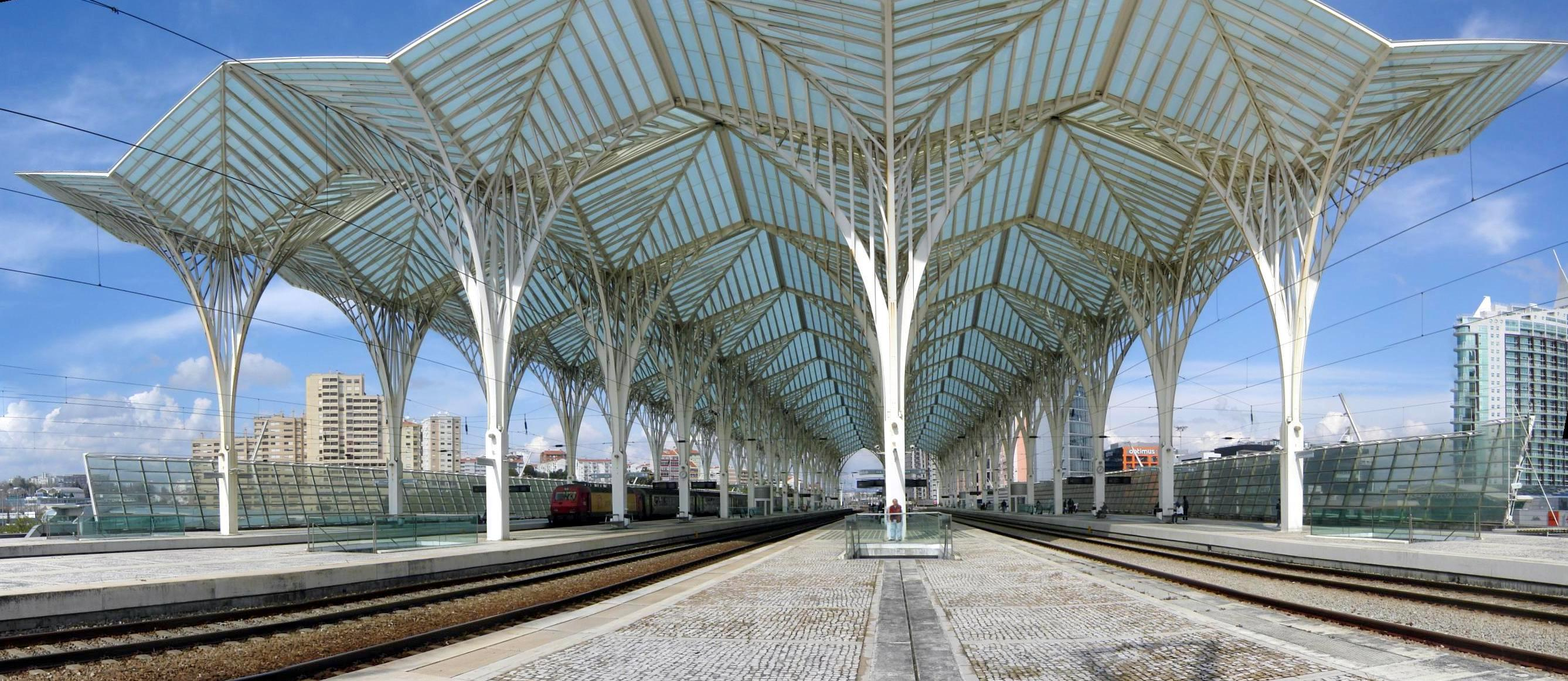
Plataforma ferroviaria da Gare do Oriente

Reforms made by local government in the first years of the 21st century established the administrative region of the Lisbon metropolitan area. Lisbon's metro system was expanded with the addition of several new stations, among them the transportation hub of Gare do Oriente, designed by the Spanish neofuturistic architect, Santiago Calatrava, and finished in time for the Expo '98 world's fair on land east of the city centre in Parque das Nações (Park of Nations). The station has since reached a ridership of 75 million passengers per year. Lisbon's international airport is located in the city centre, but with no room to expand, may soon have problems meeting demand.

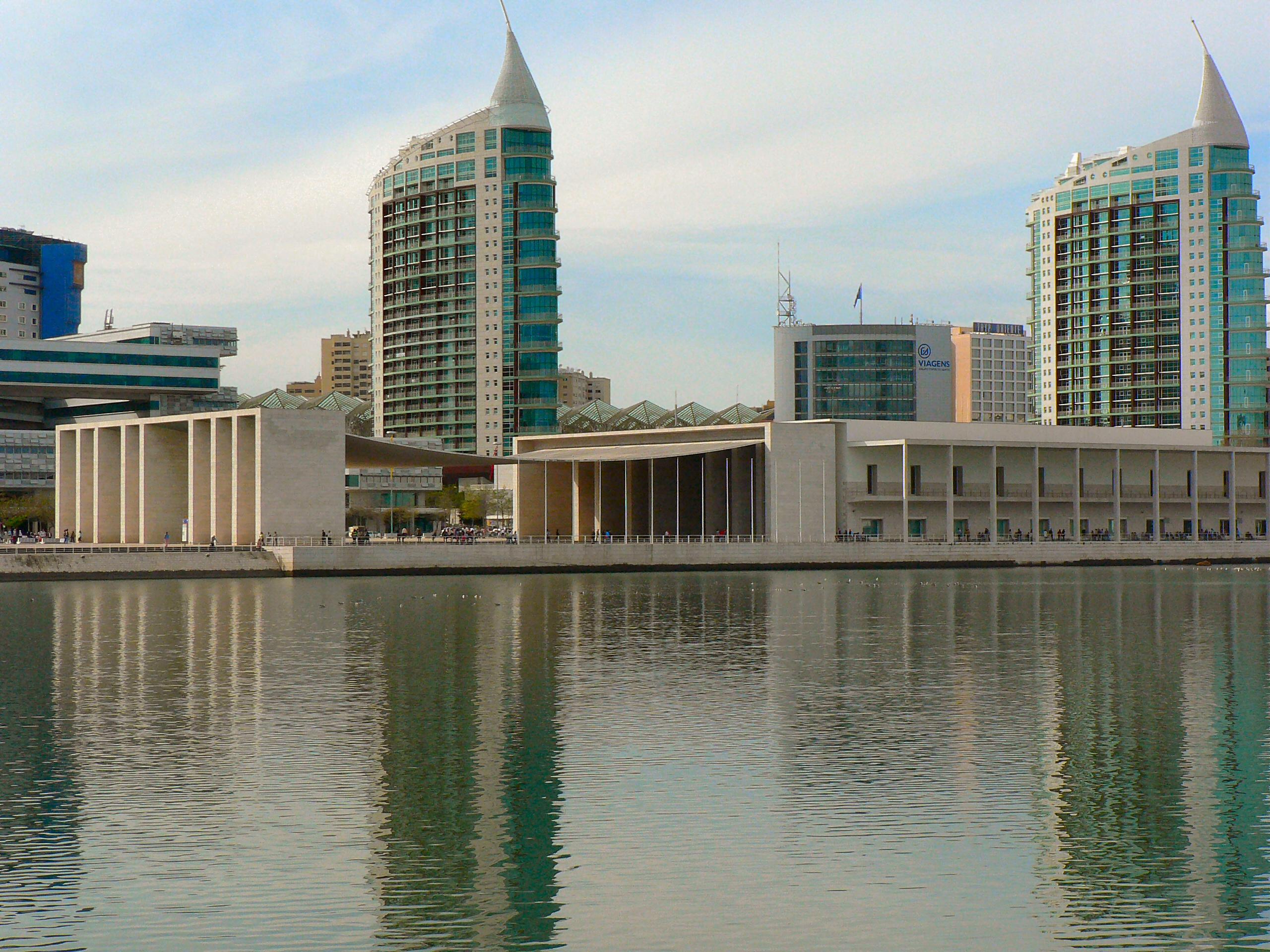
Portuguese modern architecture: buildings at Parque das Nações, Lisbon

Between 1999 and 2001, Lisbon hosted various world sport championships including the 1999 World Junior Basketball Championship, the 2000 Bowling World Championship, the 2000 Masters Cup in Tennis, the 2001 Cycling World Championships, the 2001 Fencing World Championship, and the 2001 Indoor Athletics World Championships.

The city acquired the Museu do Design e da Moda (Museum of Design and Fashion) in 2002. This small museum, located in the architecturally distinctive former Banco Nacional Ultramarino building, features displays of fashion and industrial design, grouped by decade. These consist of about a thousand objects of furniture and utilitarian design, as well as 1200 pieces of haute couture representing remarkable moments in high fashion of the 20th and 21st centuries.

On 3 November 2005, Lisbon hosted the MTV European Music Awards at the Pavilhão Atlântico. The show was opened by a leotard-clad Madonna, who exploded from a shiny disco ball to the tune "Hung Up". Lisbon is also the host city for the Portuguese editions of Rock in Rio, the largest rock festival in the world. On 7 July 2007, Lisbon was the site of the election ceremony of the "New 7 Wonders Of The World" in the Estádio da Luz, with live transmission to millions of people around the world.

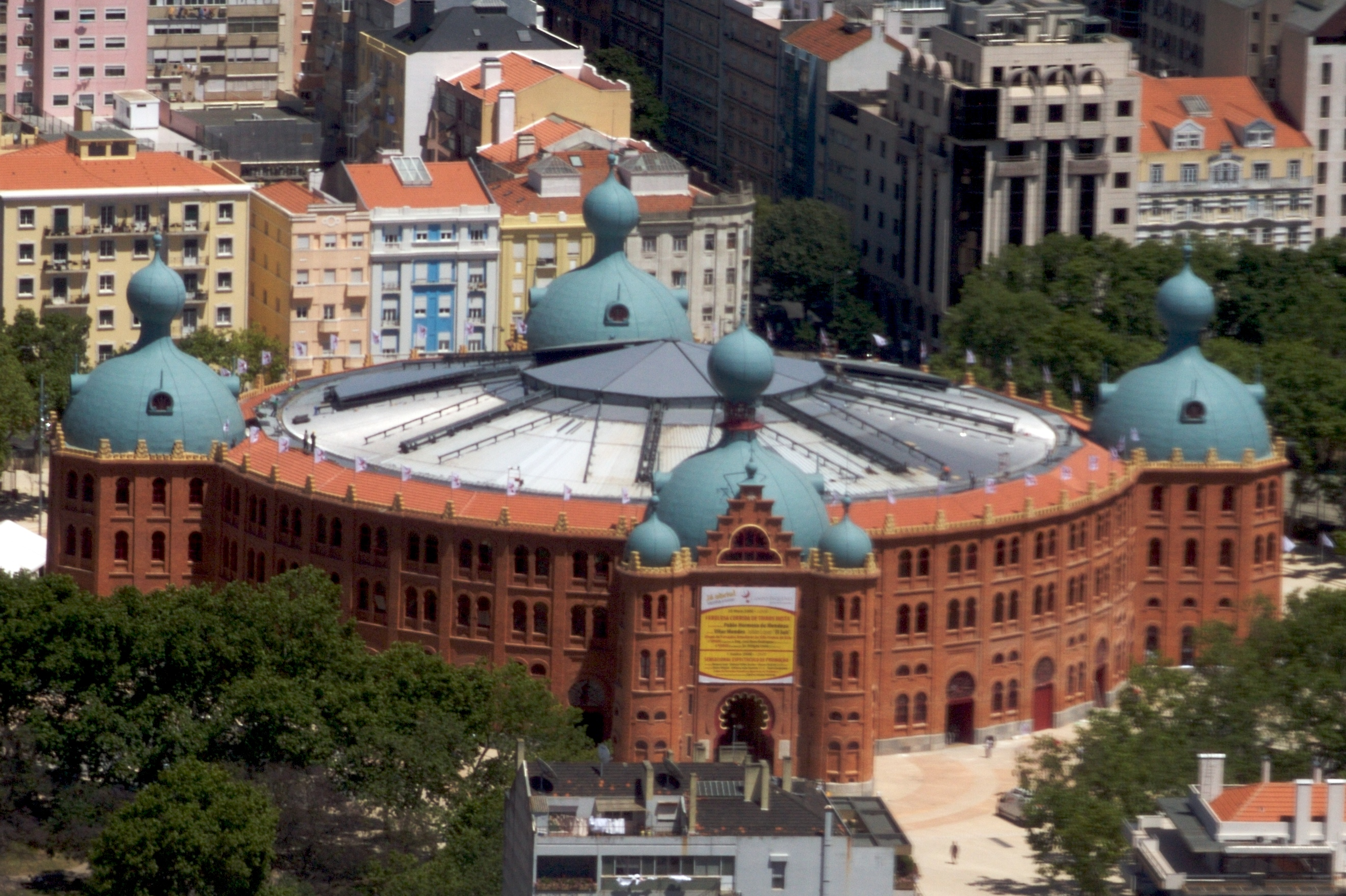
Aerial view of the Campo Pequeno bullring after its 2006 renovation

The Campo Pequeno bullring (Praça de Touros do Campo Pequeno), Lisbon's bullfighting arena, built between 1890 and 1892 in neo-Mudéjar style, is located in the Campo Pequeno Square by the Avenida da República. After a major renovation, it reopened as a multi-event venue in 2006, designed to be used for various events besides bullfighting. Including an underground shopping centre, restaurants and a parking lot, it features a range of live performances, with many famous bands having performed there.

Immigrants who came to Lisbon in the early years of the 21st century from the Portuguese-speaking African countries (PALOP), especially Angola and Guinea, now constitute a large proportion of the city's immigrant population. The majority of them arrived before the economic crisis of 2008 to fill the demand for workers in the service sector and in the construction of large public works projects.

As in the past, Lisbon has a network of outdoor vegetable gardens (hortas) providing fresh produce to residents of many of the traditional neighbourhoods in the city, although today they are officially sanctioned and regulated. Fado was often performed in the hortas of Mouraria and the Alfama during the 19th and early 20th centuries.

The Treaty of Lisbon, signed in December 2007, was the premier European Union event held in Portugal. The document was designed to improve the functioning of the Union by amending the Treaty on European Union as well as the treaty establishing the European Community. The most important reforms introduced were mitigating the chances of deadlock in the Council of the European Union, increasing the legislative and budgetary powers of the European Parliament, reducing the number of members of the European Commission, abandoning the three pillars of the European Union, and creating the positions of President of the European Council and High Representative of the Union for Foreign Affairs and Security Policy to provide greater consistency and continuity to EU policies.

The NATO Lisbon Summit of 2010 (19–20 November) convened to cement NATO'S new "Strategic Concept", a plan aiming to implement better coordination between the military and civilian organisations and to address the economic concerns of member states, as well as new threats such as cyberattacks. These summit meetings are regarded as a periodic opportunity for the Heads of State and Heads of Government of NATO member countries to evaluate and provide strategic direction for Alliance activities.

== Historical population ==
Demographic evolution of Lisbon
| 43 | 900 | 1552 | 1598 | 1720 | 1755 | 1756 | 1801 | 1849 | 1900 | 1930 | 1960 | 1981 | 1991 | 2001 | 2011 |
| 30,000 | 100,000 | 200,000 | 150,000 | 185,000 | 180,000 | 165,000 | 203,999 | 174,668 | 350,919 | 591,939 | 801,155 | 807,937 | 663,394 | 564,657 | 545,245 |

== See also ==
- History of Portugal
- Timeline of Lisbon

== Notes ==
- This article incorporates text from a publication Spain and Portugal, 1908, pp. 508–511, edited by Henry Smith Williams, now in the public domain. The original text has been edited.
- This article incorporates information translated from the equivalent article on the Portuguese Wikipedia.
