= Column of Pedro IV =

- Coluna de D. Pedro IV (Portuguese)
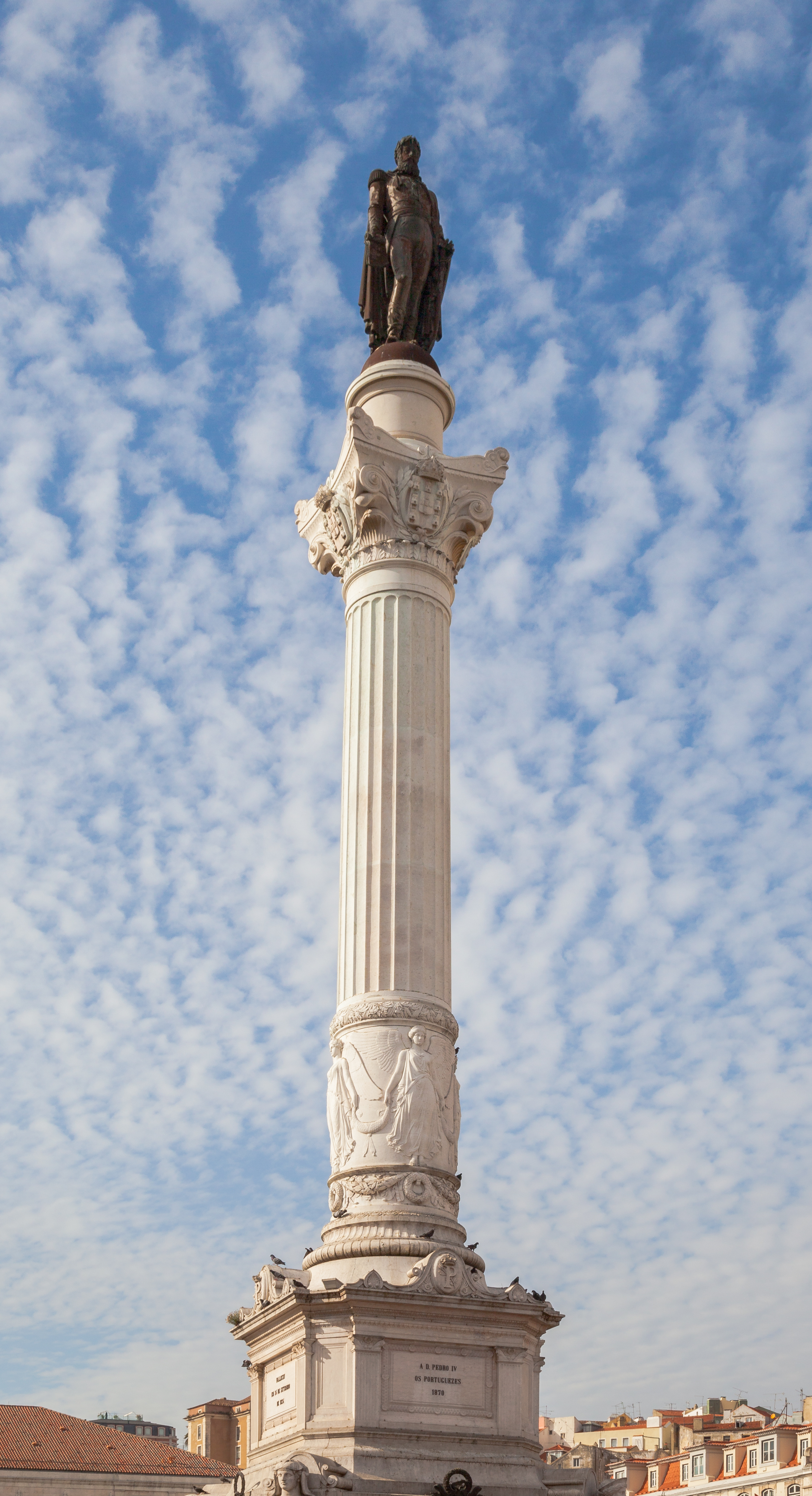
- The Column of Pedro IV
- Interactive map of Column of Pedro IV
- 38°42′50″N 9°08′22″W
- Location: Rossio Square, Lisbon, Portugal

The Column of Pedro IV (Portuguese: Coluna de D. Pedro IV) is a monument to King Pedro IV of Portugal and the Algarves, located in the centre of Rossio Square in Lisbon, Portugal. The monument was erected in 1870.

== History and details ==
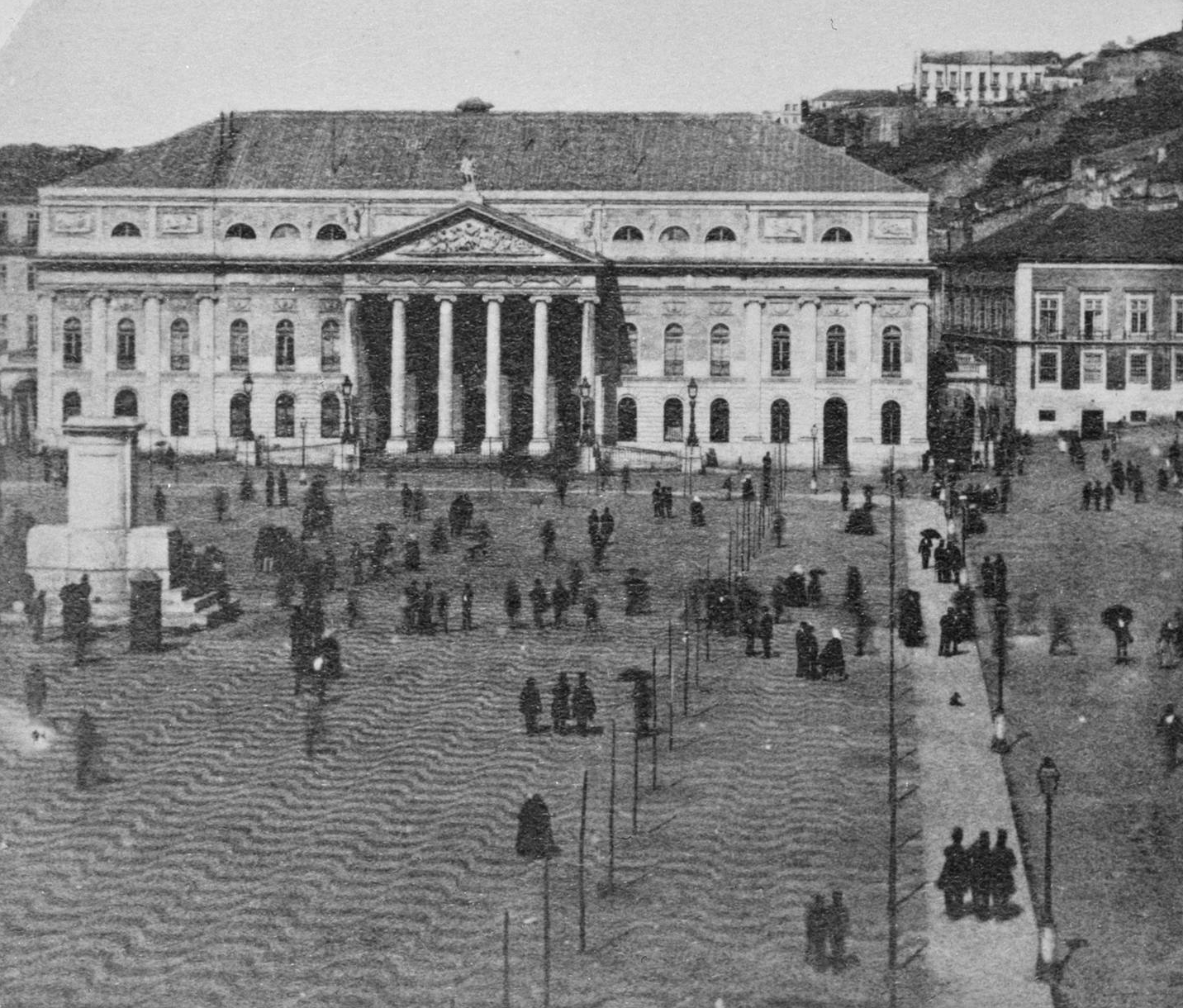
The first monument to King Pedro IV, called "o galheteiro" ("the cruet-stand") by Lisboners, in a c. 1860 photograph.

King João VI had a monument to the Constitution built in 1821 on the spot the column stands today, which was raised two years later by the same king, after Infante Miguel of Portugal (supported by Queen Carlota Joaquina) successfully led a counter-revolution to reinstate the absolute monarchy.

A first monument to King Pedro IV was erected in 1852, with Queen Maria II (King Pedro's daughter) laying the cornerstone. The monument consisted simply of a pedestal, which the Lisboners referred to as "o galheteiro" ("the cruet-stand") due to its ungraceful form. This primitive monument was demolished in 1864, after serving as the base for a temporary statue of Hymenaeus during the wedding ceremonies of King Pedro V in 1858 and King Luís I in 1862.

The current marble statue was erected on top of a 75-foot (~ 23 metres) column in 1870. The statue is of Pedro IV, King of Portugal, who was also the first Emperor of Brazil, as Pedro I. His bronze statue stands atop of a tall Corinthian order column, depicting him in a general's uniform and royal cloak, his head crowned in laurels, and holding the Constitutional Charter of 1826 in his right hand. At the base of the column, there are the four female allegorical figures of Prudence, Justice, Fortitude, and Temperance, qualities attributed to the King.

There is an urban legend that the statue atop the Column of King Pedro IV had actually been originally designed for the Emperor Maximilian I of Mexico. As the Mexican emperor was shot in 1867, shortly before the completion of the statue, it is said that the statue was then bought for the beautification of Rossio Square. Several historians, such as José Augusto, have proved this urban legend to be incorrect, pointing out the details of the statue that clearly symbolize the Portuguese king, such as the Portuguese coat of arms on the buttons, the collar of the Order of the Tower and Sword, and the Constitutional Charter of 1826, penned by Pedro himself.

== See also ==
- Rossio Square
- Monument to Pedro IV in Porto
