= Manuel da Maia =

Portuguese architect, engineer, and archivist

Manuel da Maia CvC
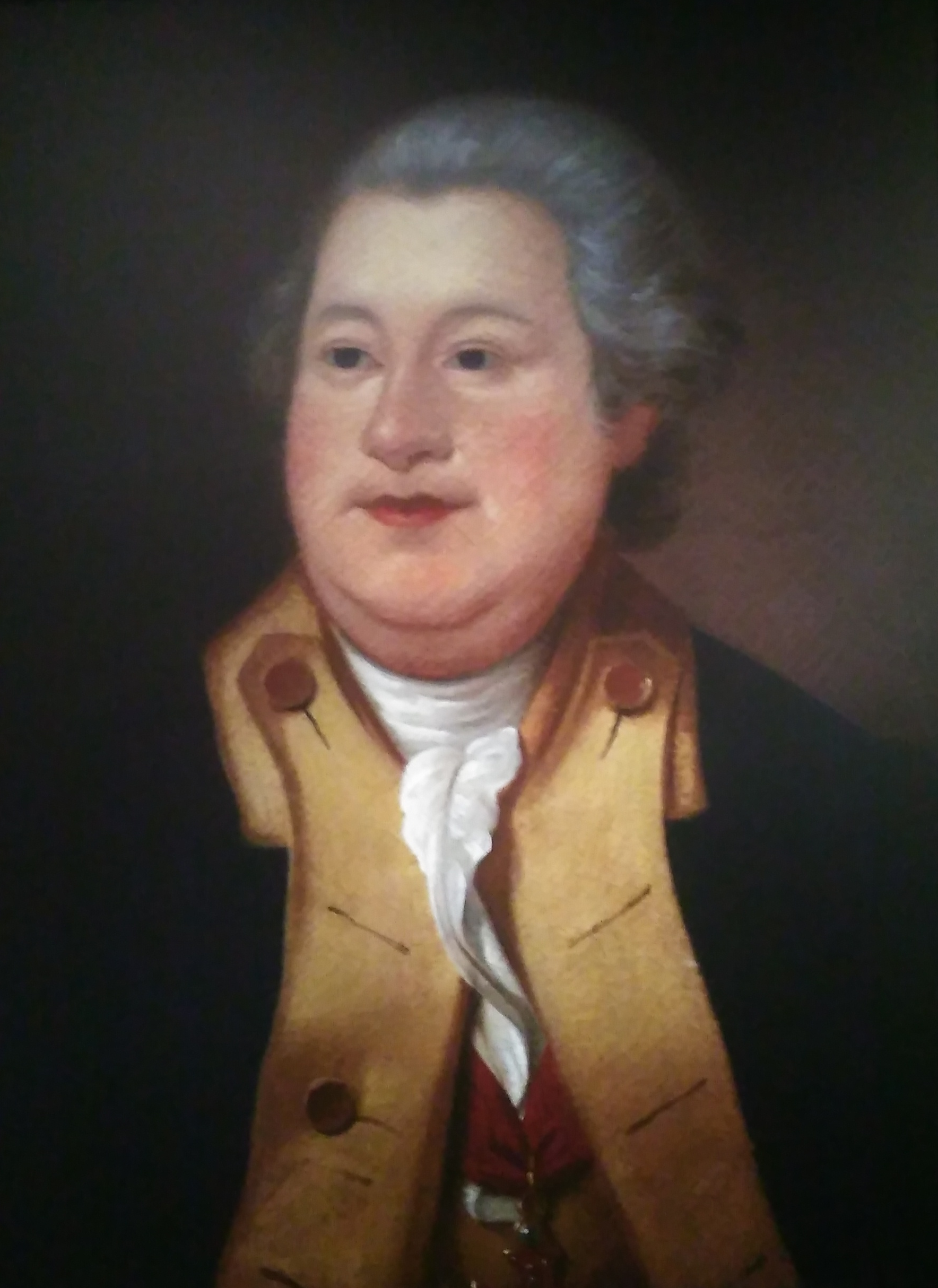

Chief Engineer of the Kingdom
- In office 24 July 1754 – 17 September 1768
- Monarch: Joseph I
- Preceded by: Manuel de Azevedo Fortes
- Succeeded by: Miguel Angelo de Blasco

Chief Guardian of the Royal Archives
- In office 12 February 1745 – 17 September 1768
- Monarch: Joseph I
- Preceded by: Martinho de Mendonça de Pina e Proença
- Succeeded by: José de Seabra da Silva

Personal details
- Born: 5 August 1677 (bap.) Lisbon, Kingdom of Portugal
- Died: 17 September 1768 (aged 91) Lisbon, Kingdom of Portugal
- Resting place: Convent of São Pedro de Alcântara, Bairro Alto, Lisbon
- Occupation: Architect and engineer

Manuel da Maia (5 August 1677, baptised – 17 September 1768) was a Portuguese architect, engineer, and archivist. Maia is primarily remembered for his leadership in the reconstruction efforts following the 1755 Lisbon earthquake, alongside Eugénio dos Santos and Carlos Mardel.

== Career ==
Maia served as Regent of the Aula de Fortificação, a Lisbon academy for military engineering and architecture. Here he taught King José I of Portugal, when he was Prince of Brazil. During his tenure as regent, he also oversaw fortification works throughout the Estremadura province, from 1703 to 1704.

On 12 November 1745, Maia was appointed High-Guardian of the Torre do Tombo, Portugal’s central archive, library, and precious works repository.

In 1747, Maia participated in the construction of the new building for the Queen Leonor of Viseu Thermal Hospital, in Caldas da Rainha, executing plans made by Eugénio dos Santos.

Owing to his successful career by then, Maia was made High-Engineer of the Kingdom, in 1754. Alongside this prestigious position, he was made a general in the Portuguese army and a Fidalgo in the Royal Household. Following his appointment, Maia began management on the construction of the Águas Livres Aqueduct, an important public work of the epoch.

Following the events of the 1755 Lisbon earthquake, and the city’s almost total destruction, Maia took responsibility for coordinating the reconstruction effort of the city. His and Eugénio dos Santos’ designs for the rebuilt Lisbon Baixa are considered some of the earliest enlightened and rational city planning designs in modern Western history.

Maia was also responsible for saving the contents of the Torre do Tombo, following the earthquake. At 75 years old, Maia personally led the safe-guarding team to São Jorge Castle, where the archives were located, and saved nearly 90,000 pieces, accumulated between 1161 and 1696. He ordered the construction of provisionary barracks to store the contents of the archives and immediately made a request to Sebastião José de Carvalho e Melo, King Joseph I’s prime-minister, for a new permanent home for the archives, which would eventually be granted to him in the form of the Convent of São Bento (which now houses the parliament of Portugal).
