= Mãe d'Água das Amoreiras =

Coordinates: 38.7213°N 9.1557°W

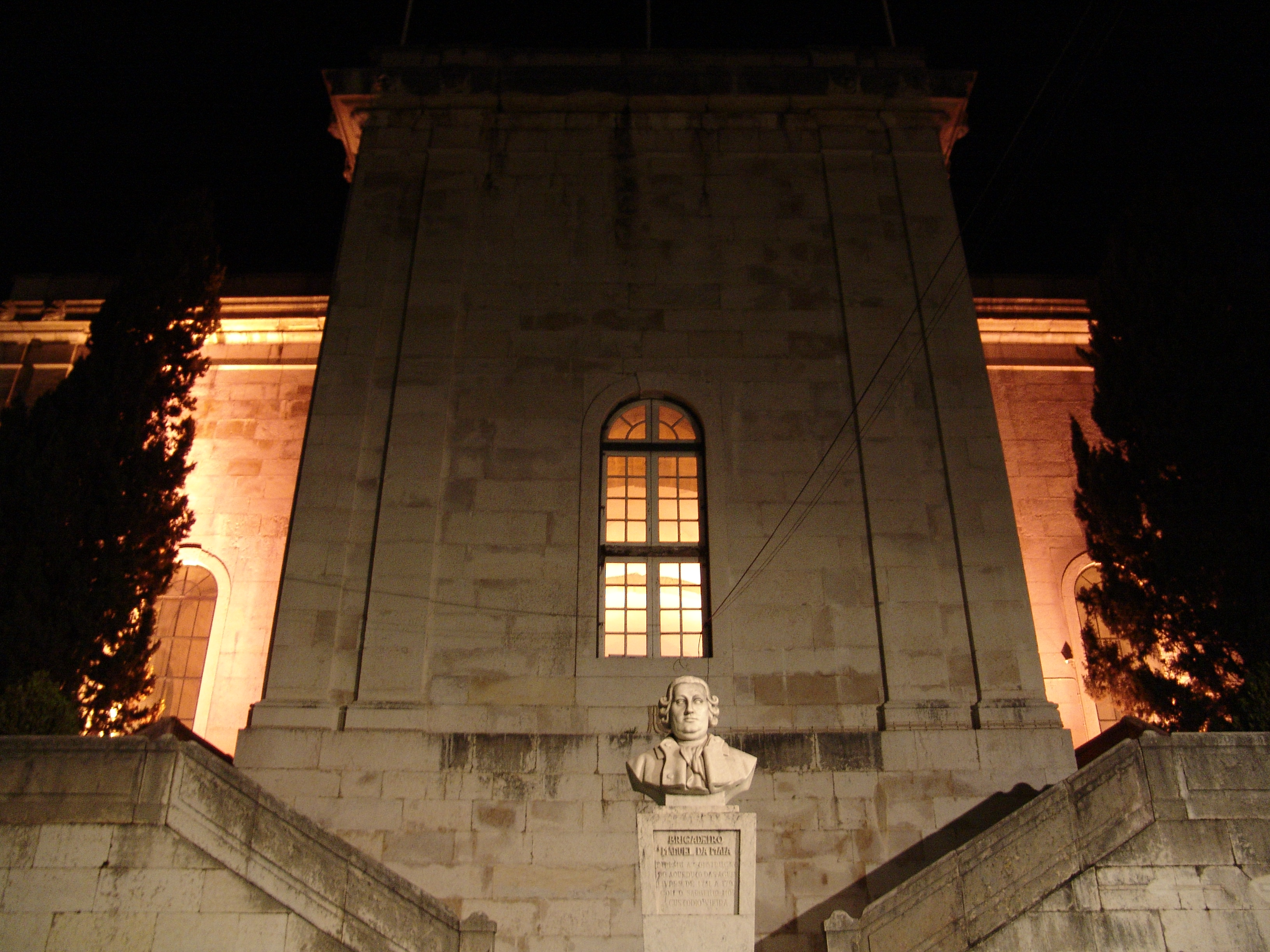
- Mãe d'Água das Amoreiras
- Interactive map of Mãe d'Água das Amoreiras
- Location: Amoreiras, Lisbon, Portugal

History
- Built: 1745–1834

Site notes
- Architect(s): Carlos Mardel, Reinaldo Manuel dos Santos
- Governing body: EPAL

The Mãe d'Água das Amoreiras (Portuguese for "Mother of Water of Amoreiras"), formally known as the Reservatório da Mãe d'Água das Amoreiras, is a historic reservoir in Lisbon, Portugal. Constructed as the terminal reservoir of the Águas Livres Aqueduct, it was designed in 1745 and completed in 1834 in the Jardim das Amoreiras district.

Today, the reservoir forms one of the four sites of the Museu da Água, operated by EPAL.

== History ==
The reservoir was originally planned for construction between São Roque and the grounds of the Palace of the Counts of Soure. It was designed by the Hungarian architect Carlos Mardel (1696–1763), one of the principal architects associated with the Águas Livres Aqueduct system.

Several houses were demolished and the terrain levelled for the works. However, by order of Sebastião José de Carvalho e Melo, better known as the Marquis of Pombal, the reservoir was ultimately built in Campolide de Baixo, near Rato.

Mardel worked on the structure from 1745 until his death in 1763. The unfinished project was resumed in 1772 by architect Reinaldo Manuel dos Santos (1731–1791), whose intervention significantly altered both the interior and exterior design of the building.

The structure was only completed in 1834, during the reign of Queen Maria II of Portugal, with the construction of its roof. Only then did the reservoir begin full operation.

Attached to the building is the Casa do Registo, from which two of the principal distribution galleries of the Águas Livres system depart: the Loreto Gallery and the Esperança Gallery. A third, smaller gallery supplied the Chafariz do Rato fountain.

== Architecture ==
The Mãe d'Água das Amoreiras is noted for its austere architectural style and monumental interior reservoir chamber. The structure is built on an elevated platform above the surrounding streets and contains a large water tank approximately 7.5 metres deep.

Inside, a cascading water inlet feeds the central cistern, creating one of the most distinctive hydraulic interiors in Lisbon’s historical infrastructure.

== Museum and exhibitions ==
The reservoir currently functions as part of the Museu da Água network in Lisbon.

In 2015, it hosted the exhibition À luz do dia até os sons brilham. Wim Wenders à descoberta de Portugal ("In Daylight Even Sounds Shine: Wim Wenders Discovering Portugal"), curated by Anna Duque y González and Laura Schmidt. The exhibition was jointly organised by the Wim Wenders Foundation, the Lisbon & Estoril Film Festival, and the Museu da Água.
