= Rossio =

Town square in Lisbon, Portugal

- Praça de D. Pedro IV (Portuguese)
- Rossio, Praça do Rossio
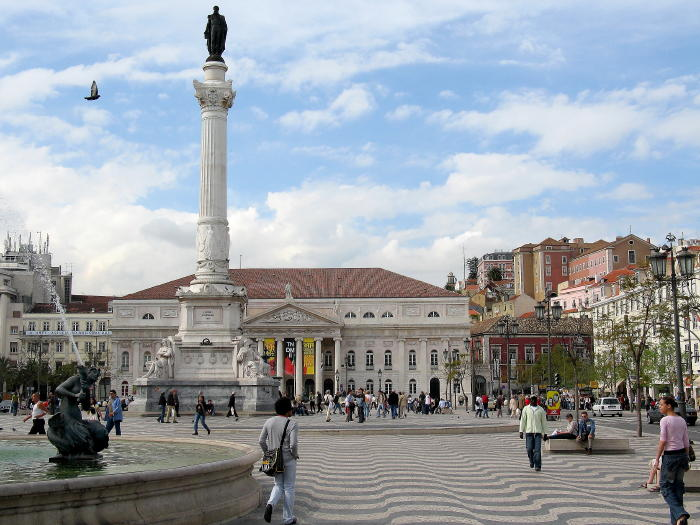
- View of the Column of Pedro IV and the D. Maria II National Theatre

- Location within Lisbon
- 38°42′50″N 9°8′22″W
- Type: Square
- Location: Lisbon, Portugal

Site notes
- Architect(s): Eugénio dos Santos, Carlos Mardel (rebuilding in the Second half of the 18th century)
- Architectural style: Pombaline style

The King Pedro IV Square (Portuguese: Praça de D. Pedro IV), popularly known as Rossio ([ʁuˈsi.u]), is a square in the Pombaline Downtown of Lisbon, Portugal. It has been one of its main squares since the Middle Ages. It has been the setting of popular revolts and celebrations, bullfights and executions, and is now a preferred meeting place of Lisbon natives and tourists alike. The square is named after Pedro IV, King of Portugal. The Column of Pedro IV is in the middle of the square.

== History and highlights ==
=== Origins ===
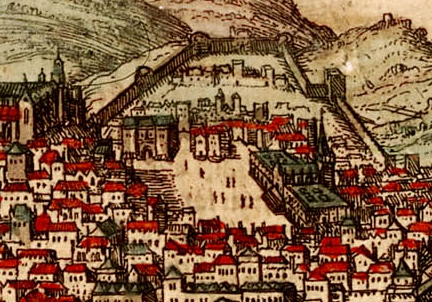
Drawing of the area around the Rossio from a 16th-century map. The square, in the middle of the image, is limited by the Estaús Palace (upper left corner of the square) and the large All-Saints Hospital (right side).

The Rossio is the Horse Market. In time the area had many public uses. Such as during the 13th and 14th centuries, when the population of the city expanded to the lower area surrounding the Lisbon Castle hill. The name "rossio" is roughly equivalent to the word "commons" in English, and refers to a commonly owned terrain. Around 1450, the Palace of Estaus, destined to house foreign dignitaries and noblemen visiting Lisbon, was built on the north side of the square. After the Inquisition was installed in Lisbon, the Palace of Estaus became its seat, and the Rossio was frequently used as setting for public executions. The first auto-da-fé took place in 1540.

In 1492, King John II ordered the building of one of the most important civil and charitative infrastructures in old Lisbon, the All-Saints Royal Hospital (Hospital Real de Todos os Santos). The hospital was finished in 1504, during the reign of King Manuel I, and occupied the whole eastern side of the square. Old pictures show the façade of the hospital to consist of a long building with an arched gallery. The portal to the chapel of the hospital, facing the Rossio, had a magnificent façade in manueline style.

Near the northeastern corner of the square, actually in the neighbouring St Domingo Square, is located the Palace of the Almadas, recognisable by its early 18th century red façade. In 1640, this Palace was the meeting point of Portuguese noblemen who conspired against Spain and led to the independence of Portugal from Spanish rule. The building is also called the Palace of the Independence for this reason. The Convent of St Dominic was established in the 13th century by the Rossio. Their church was greatly damaged by the 1755 earthquake and was rebuilt in baroque style. Its façade dominates the small St Dominic square.

=== 1755 earthquake and rebuilding ===
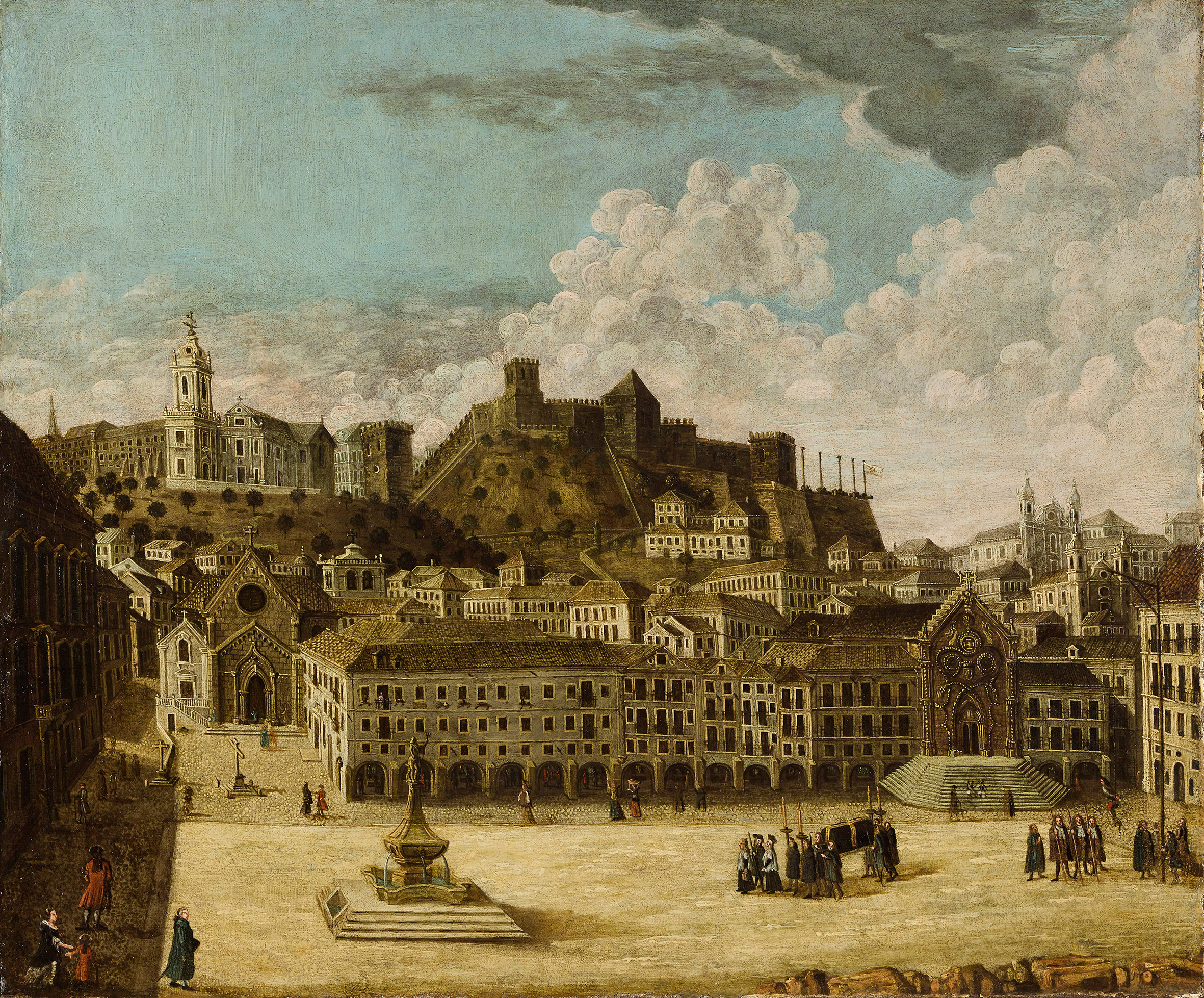
A view of the Rossio in the first half of the 18th century, appearing as it did before the earthquake struck.

Most buildings around the Rossio date from the reconstruction of the Pombaline Downtown carried out after the great 1755 Lisbon earthquake, which levelled most structures in the area, including the magnificent All-Saints Hospital. Only the Palace of the Independence survived the catastrophic earthquake. The rebuilding of the Rossio was undertaken in the second half of the 18th century by architects Eugénio dos Santos and Carlos Mardel, responsible for the typical Pombaline appearance of the buildings around the square.

From the Pombaline reconstruction dates the Bandeira Arch, (Note: Arco da Bandeira) a building at the south side of the square with a baroque pediment and a big arch that communicates the Rossio with the Sapateiros Street. The Rossio became linked to the other main square of the city, the Praça do Comércio, by two straight streets: the Áurea and the Augusta Streets.

After a fire in 1836, the old Inquisition Palace was destroyed. Thanks to the efforts of writer Almeida Garrett, it was decided to build a theatre in its place. The Teatro Nacional D. Maria II, built in the 1840s, was designed by the Italian Fortunato Lodi in neoclassical style. A statue of the renaissance Portuguese playwright Gil Vicente is located over the pediment of the theatre. Some of Gil Vicente's plays had been censured by the Inquisition back in the 16th century.

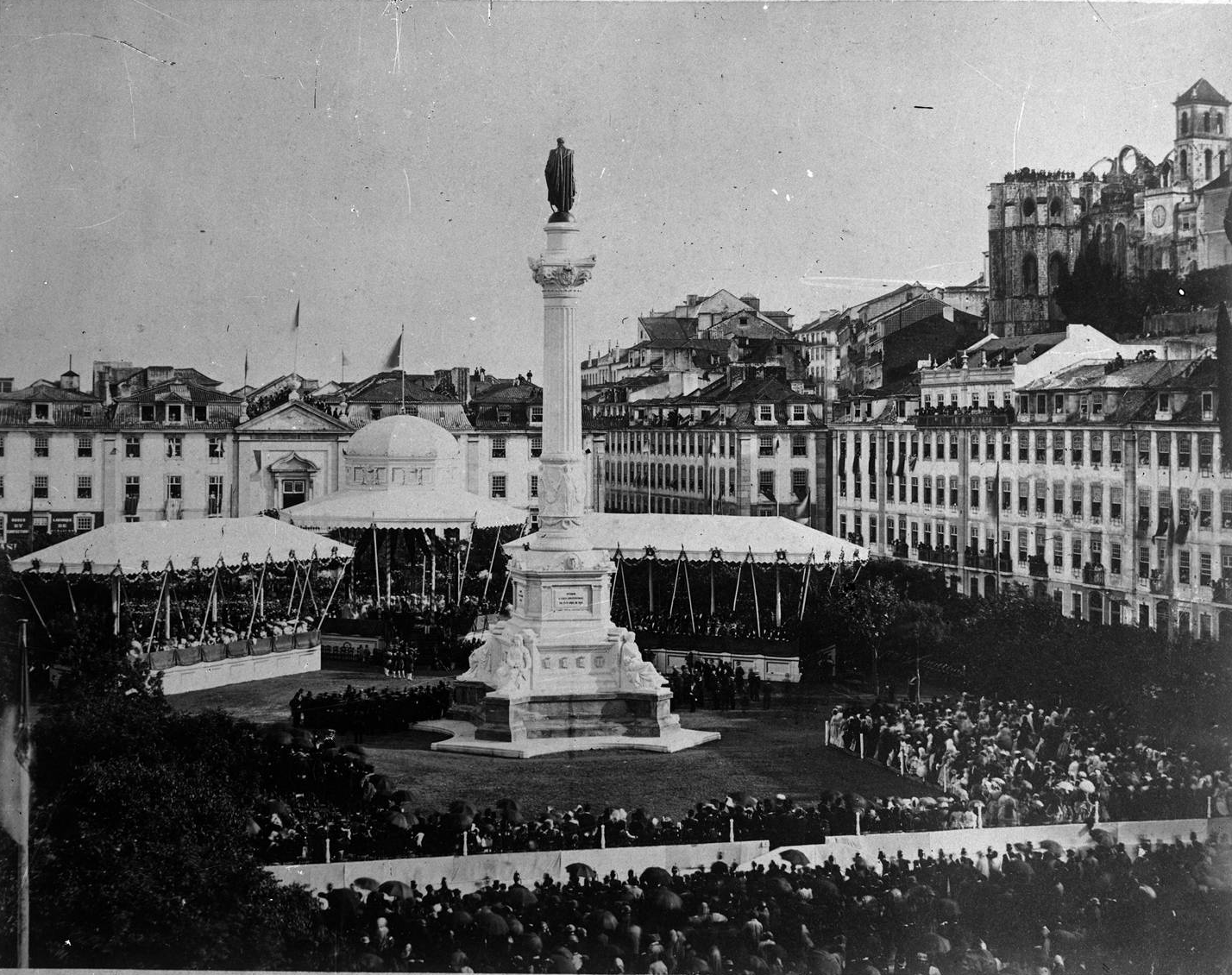
Unveiling ceremony of the Column of Pedro IV, in 1870

In the 19th century the Rossio was paved with typical Portuguese mosaic and was adorned with bronze fountains imported from France. The Column of Pedro IV was erected in 1874. At this time the square received its current official name, never accepted by the people.

Between 1886 and 1887 another important landmark was built in the square: the Rossio Train Station (Estação de Caminhos de Ferro do Rossio). The Station was built by architect José Luís Monteiro and was an important addition to the infrastructure of the city. Its neo-manueline façade dominates the northwest side of the square.

== Significance ==
The Rossio has been a meeting place for people of Lisbon for centuries. Some of the cafés and shops of the square date from the 18th century, such as the Café Nicola, where poet Manuel Maria Barbosa du Bocage used to meet friends. Other traditional shops include the Pastelaria Suíça (1922–2018) and the Ginjinha, where the typical Lisbon spirit (Ginjinha) can be tasted. The building of the Maria II Theatre and the Public Gardens to the north of the square only made the area more attended by Lisbon high society in the 19th century.

== See also ==
- Estaus Palace
- Hospital Real de Todos os Santos
- Praça do Comércio
- Rossio railway station
- Teatro Nacional D. Maria II
