= Hospital Real de Todos-os-Santos =

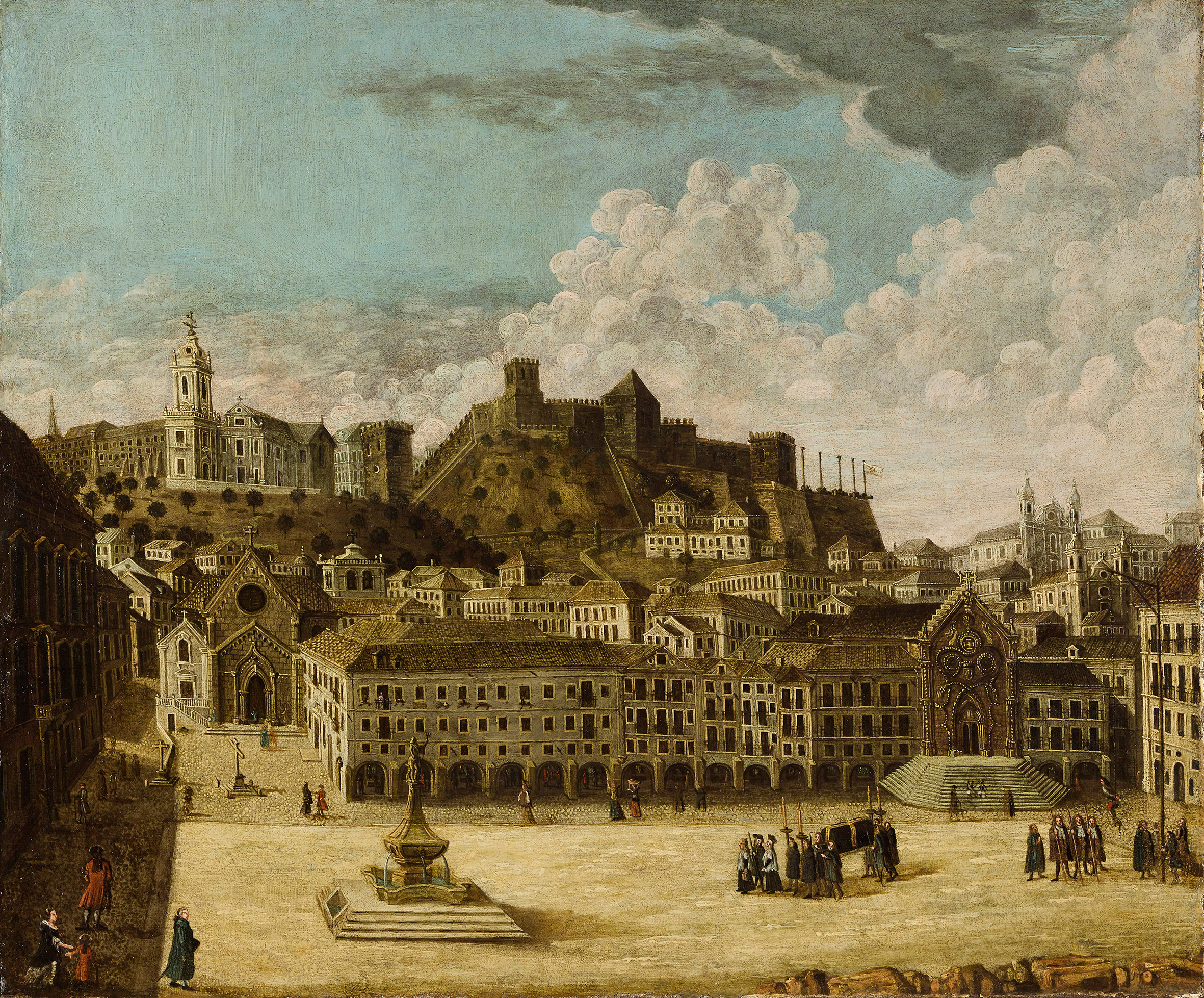
- View of the hospital sometime before 1755.

Geography
- Location: Lisbon, Portugal
- Coordinates: 38.7136°N 9.13839°W

History
- Opened: 1504
- Closed: 1755
- Demolished: 1775

Links
- Lists: Hospitals in Portugal

The Hospital Real de Todos-os-Santos (All Saints Royal Hospital) was a major hospital in Lisbon, Portugal. The hospital was built between 1492 and 1504 and was destroyed in the 1755 Lisbon earthquake, along with most of the city. It was never fully rebuilt and was finally demolished in 1775.

== Foundation ==
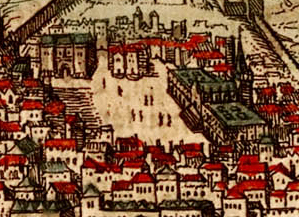
16th-century drawing of Rossio square. The All-Saints Royal Hospital is the large building at the right side of the square.

In 1492, after obtaining papal approval, King John II ordered the building of one of the most important civil and charitative infrastructures in old Lisbon, the Hospital Real de Todos-os-Santos. The Hospital was finished in 1504, during the reign of King Manuel I. The construction of the Hospital was part of a Royal campaign to centralise the health assistance of the most important cities of the Kingdom into general hospitals. Large hospitals were also founded in Coimbra (1508), Évora (1515) and Braga (1520).

== Location and architecture ==
The main façade of All-Saints Hospital occupied the whole eastern side of Rossio Square. Today's Praça da Figueira (Fig Tree Square) is located over of the area occupied by the old Hospital.

Old descriptions and excavations indicate that the building had a ground floor and two upper stories and was organised into several square-shaped wings with central courtyards around the Hospital Chapel. The Chapel was located in middle of the ensemble and had a massive tower in the eastern end of the nave.

The main façade of the Hospital had an arched gallery with buttresses in its ground floor. The entrance of the Chapel was located in the middle of the Hospital façade and was reached by a monumental stairway. Contemporary drawings show that the portal of the Chapel was a notable work in Manueline style, the Portuguese version of late Gothic typical of King Manuel I's time.

== Organisation ==
The rules of the Hospital were granted by King Manuel I in 1504, and were based on the rules of contemporary hospitals in Florence and Siena. Initially the Hospital had three infirmaries (enfermarias) located in the upper storey, where the ill were treated. The groundfloor was occupied by the Hospital personnel (around 50 people, many of whom lived in the building). The first floor housed dependencies like the kitchen, refectory and pharmacy, as well as rooms for abandoned children (called expostos), beggars and the mentally ill.

In this hospital, there also existed the "Casa das Boubas", an isolated ward for treating patients with syphilis, which had been in operation since at least 1504. In this infirmary, there was a specific arrangement for the placement of bed linens, and the patients were treated with the utmost care. This appears to have been the first infirmary worldwide specialized in the treatment of syphilitic patients, where they received differentiated care.

Initially, it is estimated that the Hospital was capable of housing around 250 people, with 2500-3000 people being treated every year. Even though the premises were victim of several fires, the facilities were greatly expanded until the middle of 18th century, when the Hospital had around 12 infirmaries. It was the most important health institution in the city and an important centre for the practical study of anatomy and medicine in Portugal.

The Hospital was initially administered by a provedor appointed by the King, but after 1564 the Hospital was run by the Irmandade da Misericórdia (Brotherhood of the Mercy), an important Portuguese religious charity established in 1498 that exists to this day.

== Destruction ==
Things changed with the massive 1755 earthquake, in which a great part of the city was destroyed by the quake itself and the fire that followed. The situation was worsened by the fact that the All Saints Hospital was greatly damaged, and the surviving patients and wounded by the quake were housed in undamaged convents and palaces. The government of King Joseph I, headed by the Marquis of Pombal, quickly started rebuilding the Hospital, which was soon treating the ill again.

For some reason, possibly related to financial constraints, the Hospital was never fully rebuilt. The Hospital facilities were transferred in 1775 to the building of the Colégio de Santo Antão, a Jesuit college that was confiscated by the Crown after the Jesuit Order was expelled from Portugal in 1759. The new Hospital was renamed Hospital de São José, paying hommage to King Joseph I. The remnants of the All Saints Hospital were demolished and a new square was created, the Praça da Figueira (Square of the Fig Tree).

== See also ==
- Rossio
- Praça da Figueira
