= Águas Livres Aqueduct =

Historic aqueduct in Lisbon, Portugal

- Aqueduto das Águas Livres
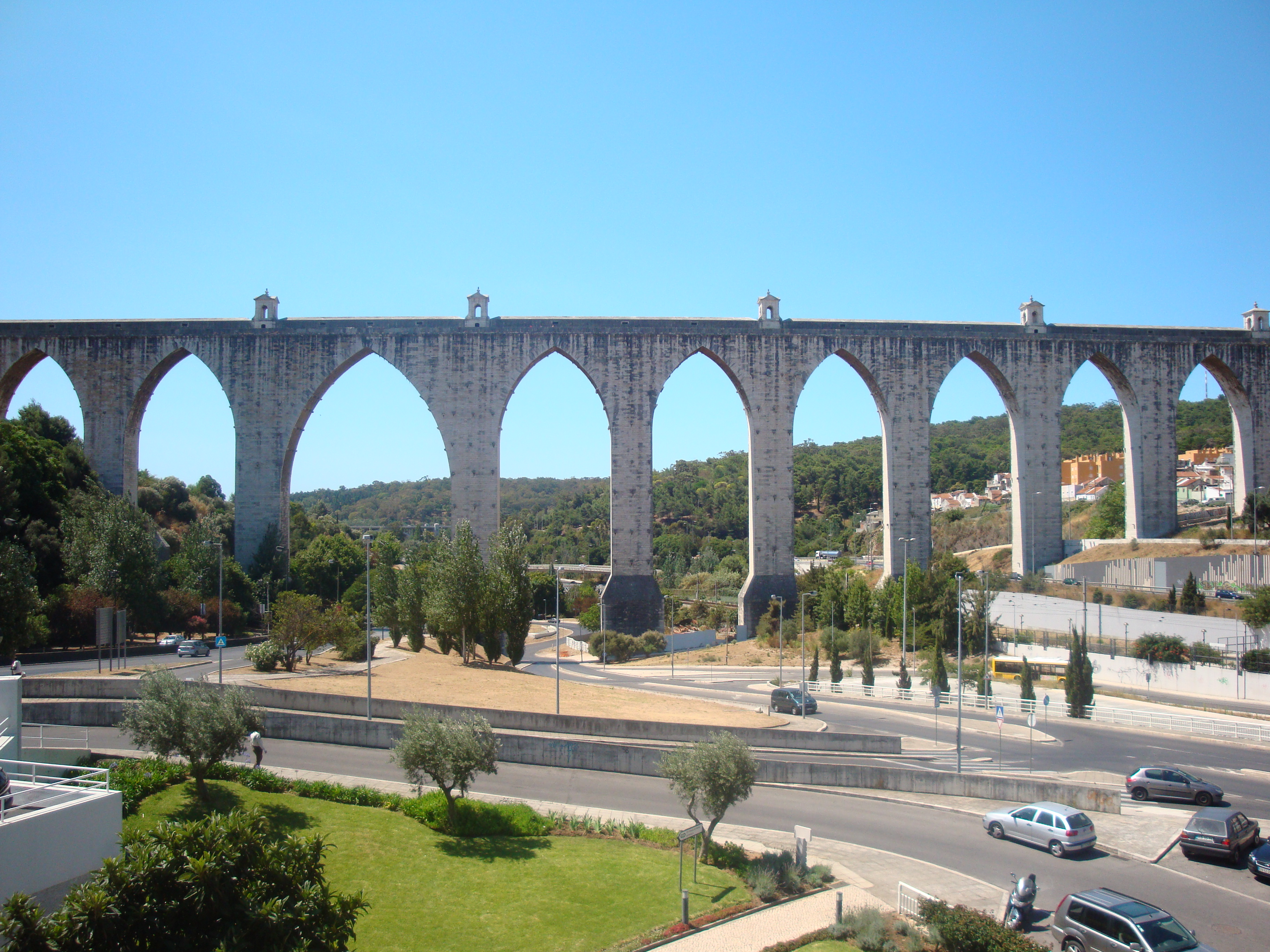
- The aqueduct crossing the Alcântara valley
- Interactive map of the Águas Livres Aqueduct area

General information
- Architectural style: Baroque, Neoclassical
- Location: Lisbon, Portugal
- Coordinates: 38°43′44″N 9°10′09″W
- Groundbreaking: 1731
- Completed: 1834
- Owner: EPAL

Design and construction
- Architects: Antonio Canevari, Carlos Mardel, Custódio Vieira, João Frederico Ludovice, Manuel da Costa Negreiros, Reinaldo Manuel dos Santos
- Engineer: José da Silva Pais, Manuel da Maia, Manuel de Azevedo Fortes

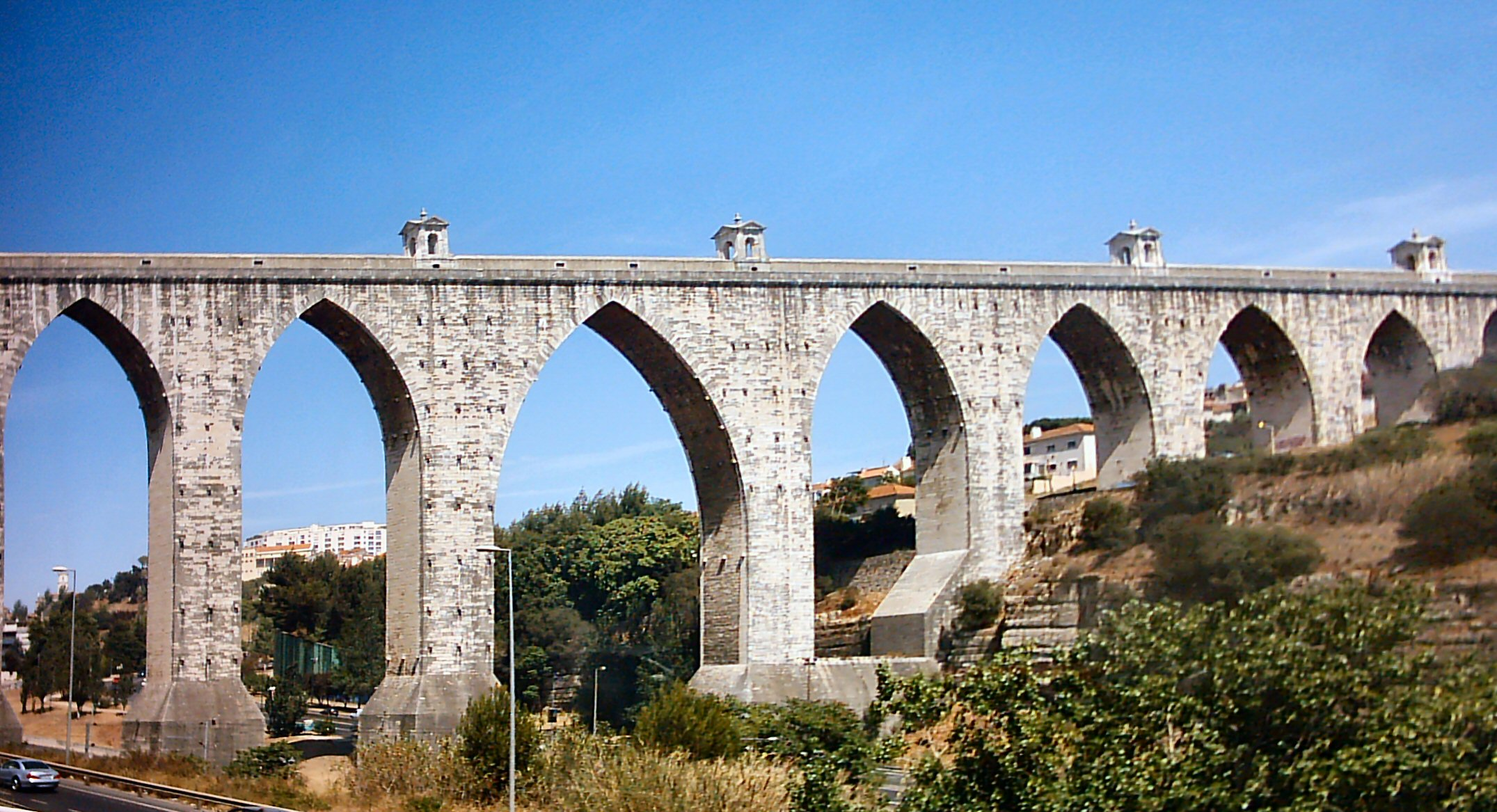
Aqueduct arches over the Alcântara valley

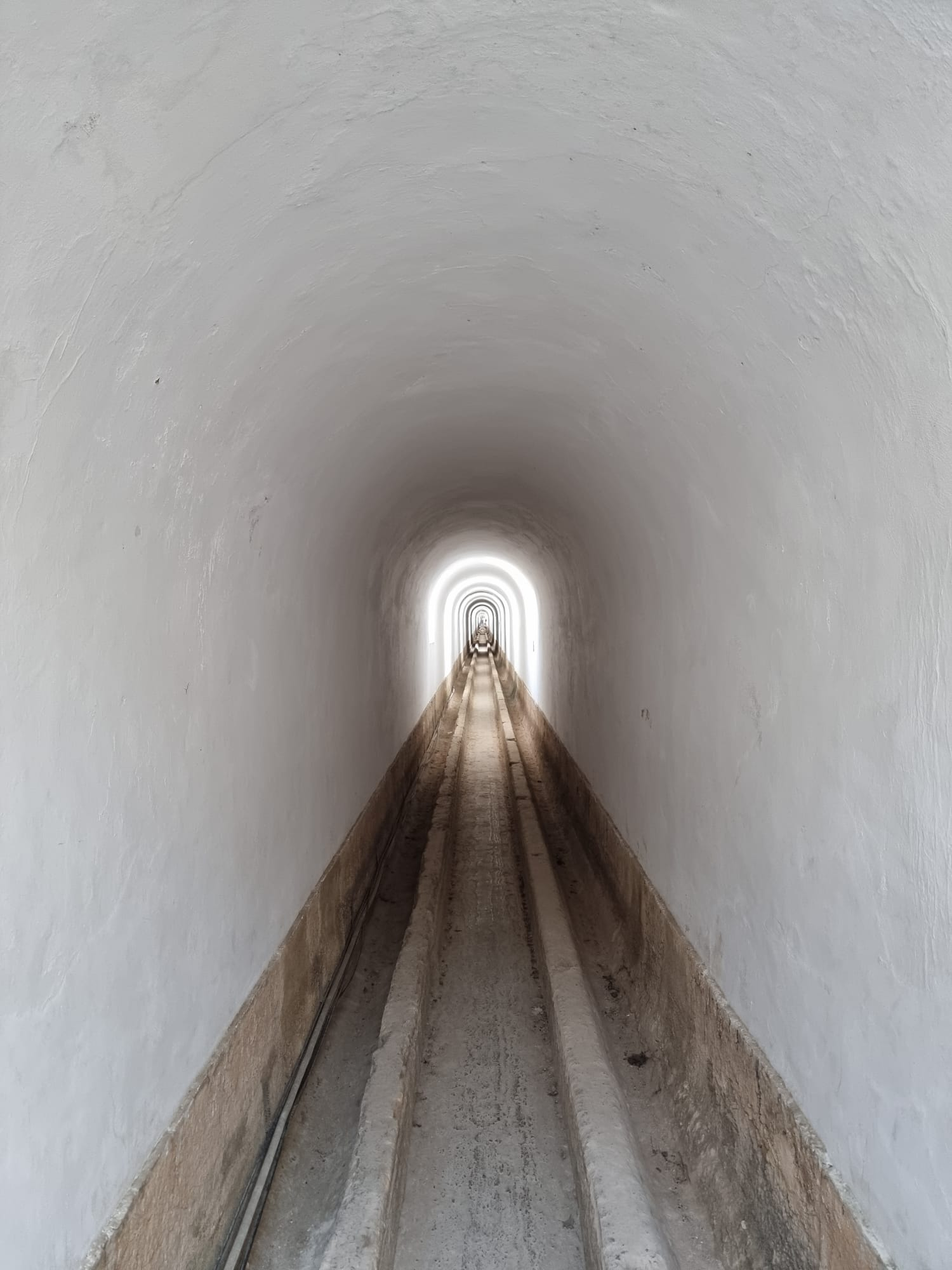
Interior gallery of the aqueduct near Alcântara

The Águas Livres Aqueduct (Portuguese: Aqueduto das Águas Livres; "Aqueduct of the Free Waters") is a historic aqueduct system in Lisbon, Portugal. It is considered one of the most remarkable examples of 18th-century Portuguese engineering and one of Lisbon's best-known landmarks.

The main aqueduct extends approximately 14.2 kilometres (8.8 mi), while the complete network of canals, galleries, reservoirs, and distribution systems reaches nearly 58 kilometres (36 mi). Its most famous feature is the monumental arcade crossing the Alcântara valley, including the Arco Grande, one of the tallest pointed masonry arches in the world.

Commissioned by King John V in the early 18th century, the aqueduct survived the 1755 Lisbon earthquake without significant damage.

== History ==
=== Background ===
Water scarcity had been a chronic problem in Lisbon since ancient times. Although the city lies beside the Tagus estuary, the river water was unsuitable for drinking because of its salinity. Reliable freshwater springs existed mainly in the district of Alfama, but Lisbon's expansion beyond its medieval walls created severe shortages.

The idea of bringing water from the valley of the Carenque stream near Belas had existed since Roman times. The Romans had constructed the Roman Dam of Belas and an aqueduct in the area.

In 1571, Francisco de Holanda proposed to King Sebastian the construction of a water supply system using the remains of the Roman infrastructure. The proposal resurfaced in 1620 during the reign of Philip II of Portugal, although no construction followed.

In 1728, Lisbon authorities introduced taxes on wine, meat, olive oil, and other food products to finance the aqueduct project. In 1729, three men were appointed to prepare the construction plans: the Italian architect Antonio Canevari, the Portuguese engineer Manuel da Maia, and the German architect João Frederico Ludovice, who had also designed the Mafra National Palace.

=== Construction ===
Construction officially began in 1731 under royal decree issued by King John V. Canevari was removed from the project in 1732 and replaced by Manuel da Maia, who established the route of the aqueduct from the springs to Lisbon and planned the terminal reservoir system from which water would be distributed to fountains throughout the city.

Progress was initially slow because of conflicts between administrators and technical officials. Around 1736, Custódio Vieira became chief architect and accelerated the works.

In 1740, construction began on the monumental section over the Alcântara valley. The Arco Grande was completed in 1744. Following Vieira's death, the Hungarian architect Carlos Mardel assumed responsibility for the project.

Mardel later played an important role in the reconstruction of Lisbon after the earthquake of 1755. He also altered the original plans by relocating the principal terminal reservoir, the Mãe d'Água, to the Amoreiras district near the Rato area.

The aqueduct entered operation in 1748, transporting approximately 1,300 cubic metres of water per day, roughly triple Lisbon's previous supply.

Aqueduct and commemorative arch in the Amoreiras neighbourhood

=== Use and expansion ===
After beginning operations, the aqueduct supplied a growing network of fountains and reservoirs throughout Lisbon using gravity alone. New public fountains such as the Chafariz da Esperança were constructed.

As Lisbon's population increased, the system was continuously expanded with tributary aqueducts and galleries to collect additional spring water. At its maximum extent, the network included approximately 58,135 metres (36.123 mi) of underground and elevated galleries.

The public walkway above the aqueduct was permanently closed in 1852. Contrary to popular legend, the closure was unrelated to the crimes attributed to serial killer Diogo Alves.

After the introduction of the Alviela Aqueduct in the late 19th century, the importance of the Águas Livres system declined. Water from the Alviela River was pumped by steam engines to the Barbadinhos reservoir and distributed throughout Lisbon.

The aqueduct nevertheless remained operational until 1967 through the use of internal metal piping carrying water from alternative sources. The system was formally decommissioned in 1968 by the Companhia das Águas de Lisboa.

Today, portions of the aqueduct, reservoirs, and galleries are open to visitors through the Museu da Água (Water Museum).

== Structure and characteristics ==
=== Main aqueduct ===
The aqueduct begins at the Mãe d'Água Velha near Belas and terminates at the Mãe d'Água das Amoreiras reservoir in Lisbon after a route of approximately 14,174 metres (8.807 mi).

The broader water collection network eventually reached 47 kilometres (29 mi) and gathered water from 58 springs, many located in the Serra da Carregueira. Including Lisbon's urban distribution network, the total system extended approximately 58 kilometres (36 mi).

=== Alcântara valley arches ===
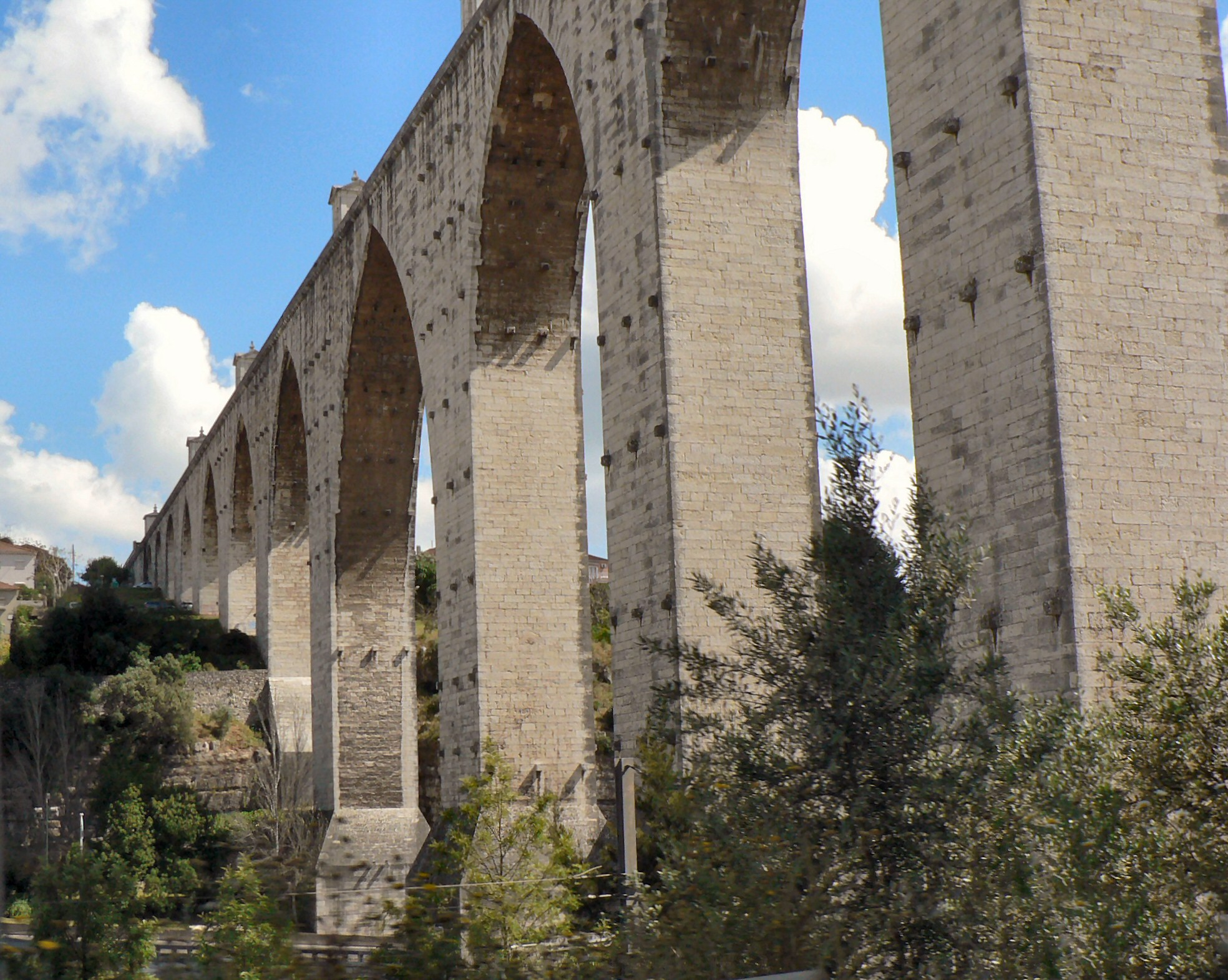
The Alcântara valley arcade

The best-known section of the aqueduct is the arcade crossing the Alcântara valley. The structure measures 941 metres (3,087 ft) in length and consists of 35 arches, including 21 semicircular arches and 14 pointed arches.

The tallest and most famous is the Arco Grande, which reaches 65 metres (213 ft) in height with a span of nearly 29 metres (95 ft). It is considered one of the tallest pointed masonry arches in the world.

The pointed arches were selected because of the large spans and heights required across the valley. The aqueduct contains two narrow pedestrian walkways inside the thickness of the structure, separated by the water gallery itself. Ventilation lanterns connected the walkways and also aerated the water supply.

Today, several transport routes pass beneath the arches, including the Linha de Cintura railway, the Lisbon north–south expressway, and Avenida Calouste Gulbenkian.

=== Tributary aqueducts ===
As demand increased, several tributary aqueducts were connected to the main system, including the Aqueduto do Caneiro, Aqueduto da Mata, Aqueduto das Galegas, and Aqueduto das Francesas.

=== Arco do Carvalhão ===
The Arco do Carvalhão is another visible section of the aqueduct after the Alcântara crossing. Constructed between 1742 and 1745, it consists of four semicircular arches designed by Custódio Vieira and Carlos Mardel.

The structure was named after the landowner Sebastião José de Carvalho e Melo, later known as the Marquis of Pombal.

=== Mãe d'Água das Amoreiras ===
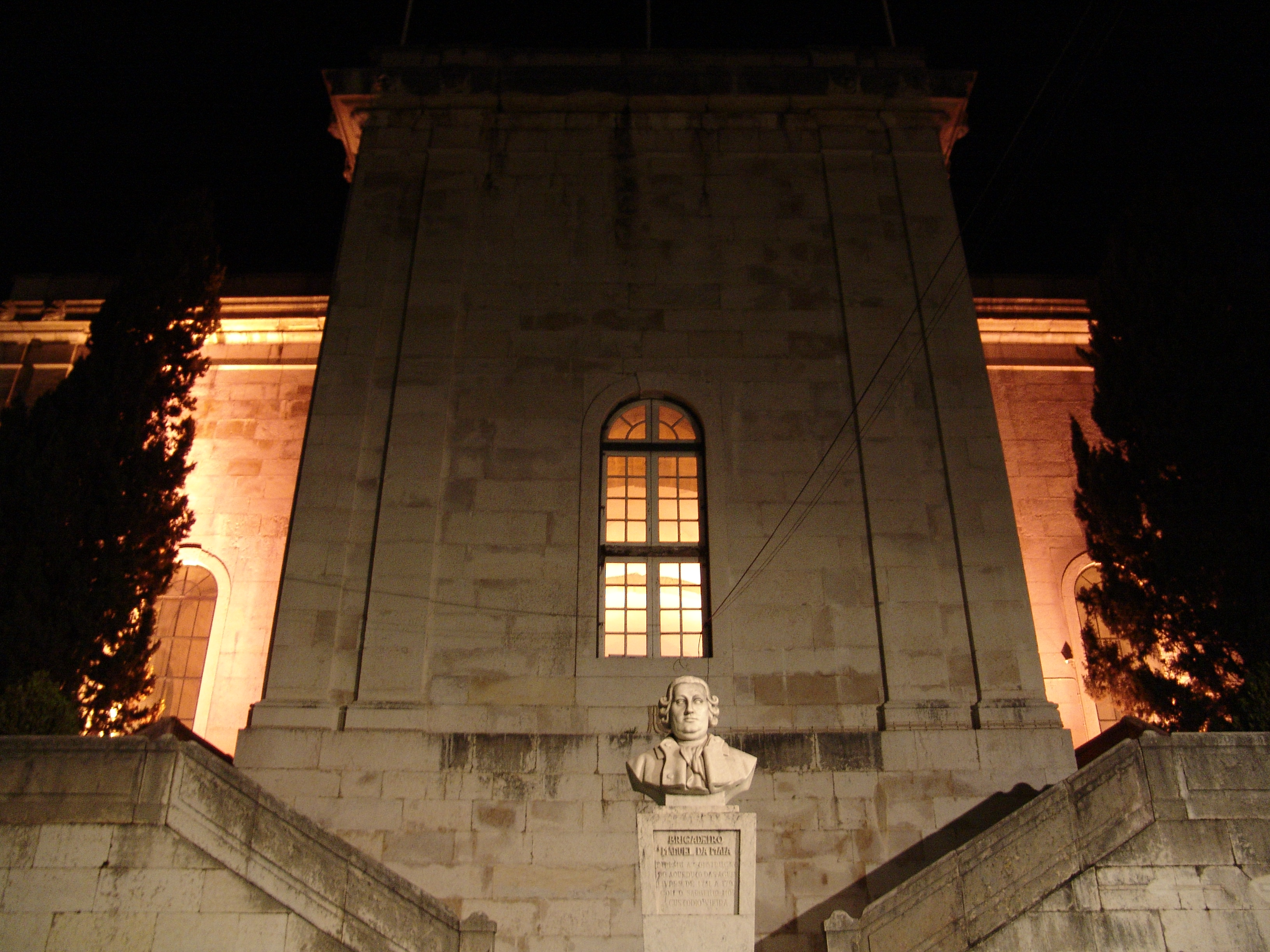
Mãe d'Água das Amoreiras reservoir

The Mãe d'Água das Amoreiras reservoir was designed primarily by Carlos Mardel and later completed by Reinaldo Manuel dos Santos. Construction began in 1745 and the structure was only fully completed in 1834 during the reign of Queen Maria II.

The reservoir has a storage capacity of approximately 5,500 cubic metres of water. It served as the principal terminal reservoir for the aqueduct system and distributed water through several major galleries, including the Galeria das Necessidades, Galeria da Esperança, Galeria do Rato, Galeria do Loreto, and Galeria de Santana.

The reservoir is now part of the Museu da Água and is used for exhibitions, cultural events, and public visits.

== Distribution system ==
Water distribution from the aqueduct was carried out primarily through public fountains. Before reaching central Lisbon, the system already supplied areas such as Falagueira, Benfica, and São Domingos de Benfica.

Five principal galleries distributed water throughout Lisbon between the valleys of Arroios and Alcântara:

- Galeria das Necessidades
- Galeria da Esperança
- Galeria do Rato
- Galeria do Loreto
- Galeria de Santana

The first four departed from the Amoreiras reservoir, while the Galeria de Santana originated near the Arco do Carvalhão.

== In literature ==
In 2004, Portuguese writer Pedro Almeida Vieira published the historical novel Nove Mil Passos, centred on Lisbon's water shortages and the construction of the Águas Livres Aqueduct.

== See also ==
- List of aqueducts
