= Liberdade Square (Porto) =

Square in Porto, Portugal

Coordinates: 41.1465°N 8.6114°W

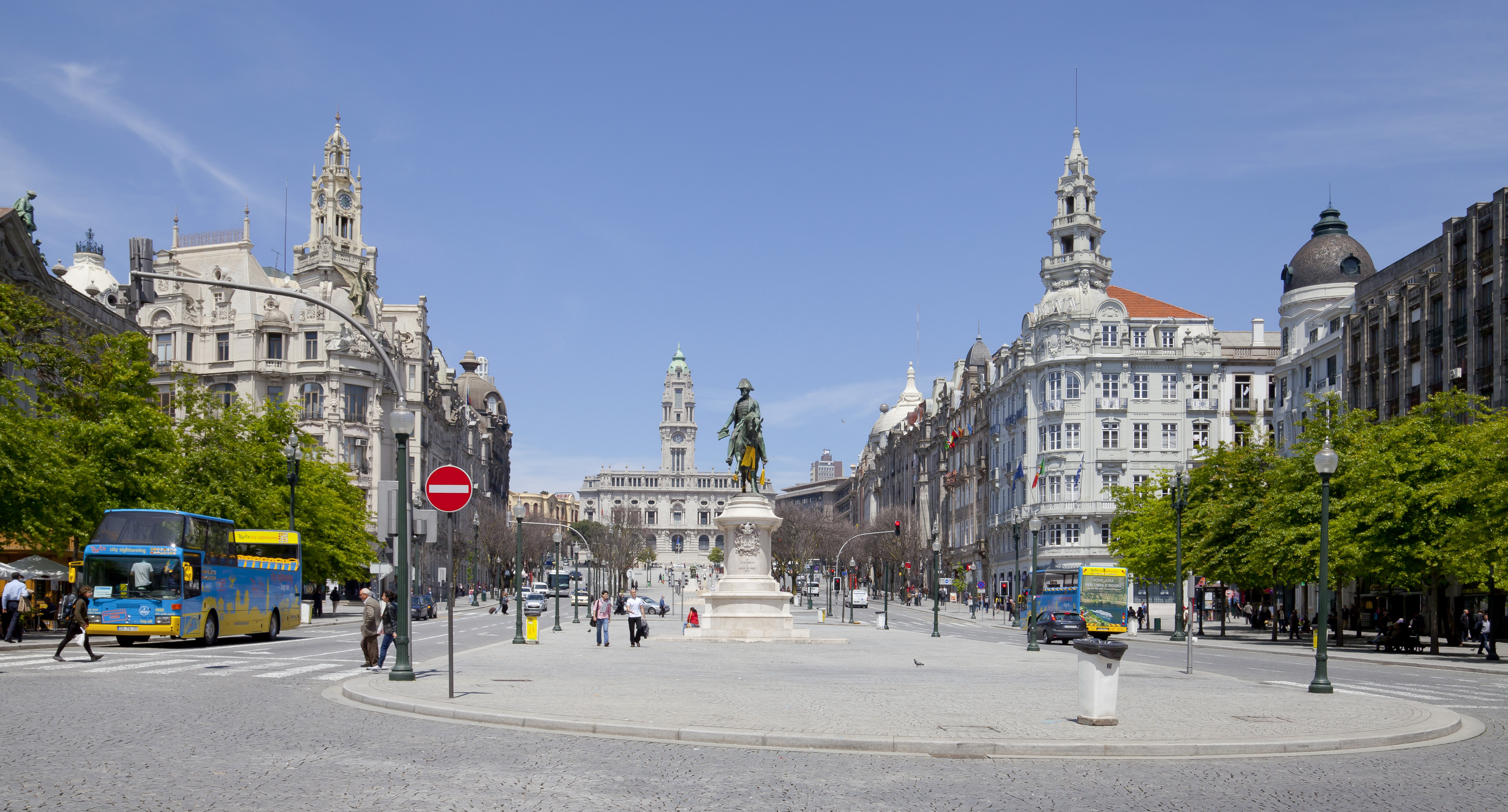
- Liberdade Square
- Interactive map of Liberdade Square
- Former names: Campo da Arca das Hortas ou Largo das Hortas; Praça Nova; Rua da Natividade; Porta dos Carros; Praça da Constituição; Praça de D. Pedro IV
- Area: 9,086 square kilometres (3,508 sq mi)
- Location: Porto, Portugal

Construction
- Inauguration: 16th century

Liberdade Square (Liberty or Freedom Square; Portuguese: Praça da Liberdade) is a square in the city of Porto, Portugal. It is located in Santo Ildefonso parish, in the lower town (Baixa) area. The square is continuous on its north side with the Avenida dos Aliados, an important avenue of the city.

== History ==
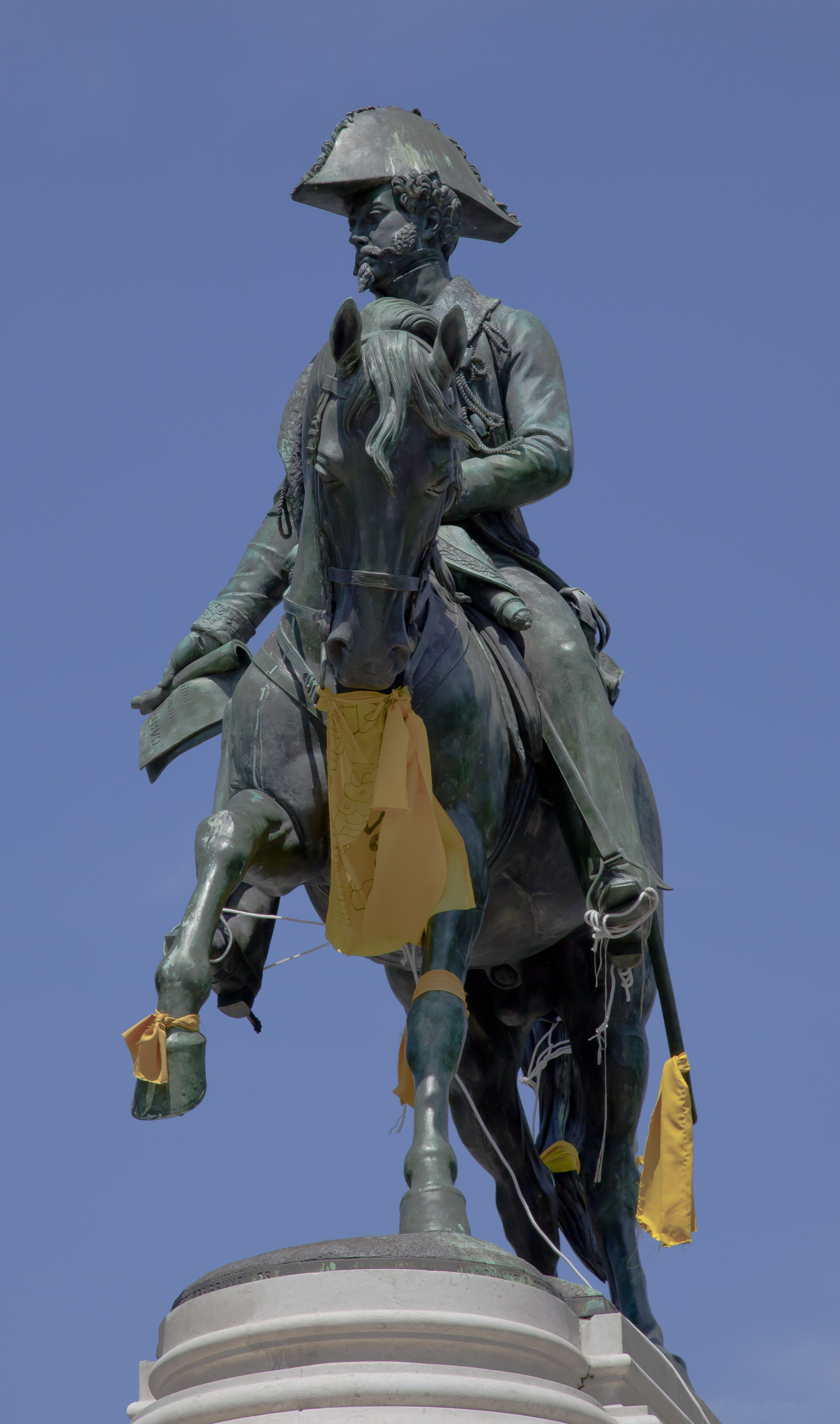
Monument to King Peter IV

The square has its origins in the beginning of the 18th century. It was in 1718 that a project for the urbanisation of the area begun, which resulted in the creation of new streets and an ample square, known as Praça Nova (New Square). The square was initially limited by the medieval walls of the city and by urban palaces, all of which are now lost.

After 1788, the religious order of Saint Eligius (known as Lóios, in Portuguese) built a convent on the south side of the square that replaced the medieval wall; the imposing Neoclassical façade of the convent, nowadays known as the Cardosas Palace (Palácio das Cardosas) is the oldest extant building of the square, dominating the south side of the square for over 200 years.

During the 19th century, several factors increased the importance of the square. The municipality moved to a building on the north side of the square after 1819, and towards the end of the century facilities like the D. Luís Bridge (1887) and São Bento Train Station (1896) were opened nearby. Liberdade Square was a political, economical and social centre for Porto.

In 1866 a monument dedicated to King Peter IV, a monarch closely linked to Porto, was inaugurated in the middle of the square. The monument, by French sculptor Anatole Calmels, consists of a statue of Peter IV riding a horse and holding the Constitution that he had fought to protect during the Liberal Wars.

The appearance of the square was much altered after 1916, when the municipality building was demolished and the Avenida dos Aliados, a modern boulevard, was built to the north of the square. The buildings around Liberdade Square and the avenues are occupied by banks, hotels, restaurants and offices. It is an important tourist attraction of the city.

== Points of interest ==
- Monument to Pedro IV
- Banco de Portugal
- Palace of Cardosas

== See also ==
Ribeira Square
