= Antonio Canevari =

Italian architect

Antonio Canevari (Rome, 1681– Naples, 1764) was an Italian architect of the Rococo and Neoclassical periods.

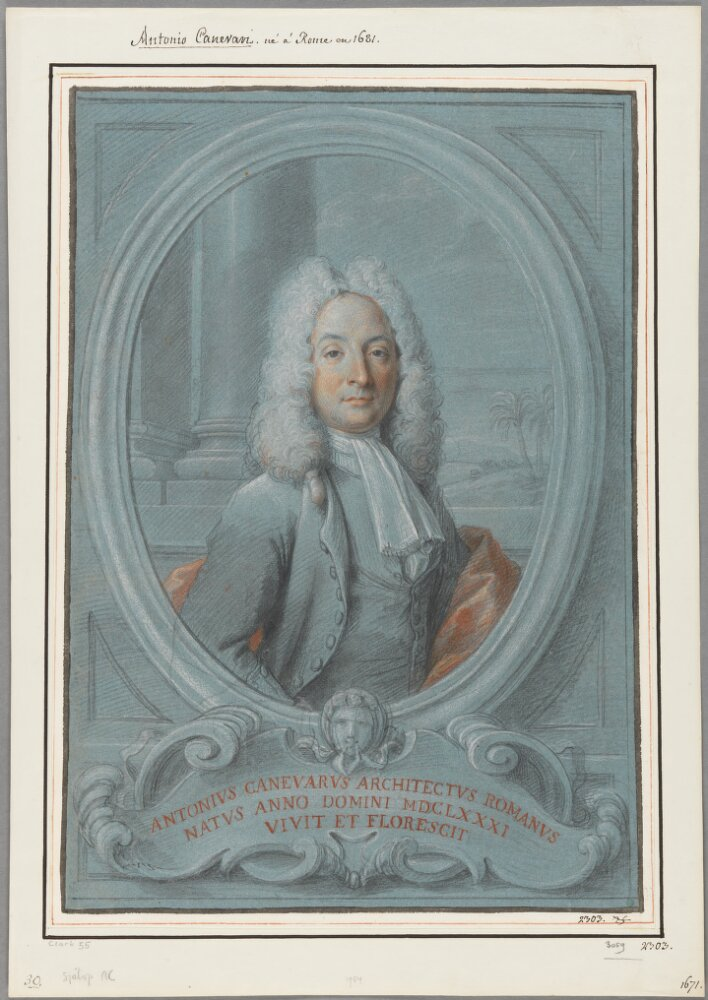
Agostino Masucci - Portrait of Antonio Canevari

He trained with a poorly known architect by the name of Antonio Caleri, and began early work in Rome. Moved to Lisbon in 1725, and then to Naples, Italy. In Rome, as a young 22-year-old he won a design competition of the Accademia di San Luca. He helped design the Chiesa delle Stimmate, and reconstruct the church of Santi Giovanni e Paolo. He provided some designs (not used) for restructuring San Giovanni Laterano and competed with Juvarra, Michetti, and others for refurbishing the sacristy of St Peter's Basilica. In Portugal, he helped build the Aqueduto das Águas Livres, an important aqueduct supplying the city of Lisbon; much of his work was destroyed by the 1755 Lisbon earthquake, his other works there included the towers of the University of Coimbra and of the Royal Palace. In Naples, he worked on the Royal Palace of Capodimonte, the Royal Palace of Portici, and in the designs of the Porta Nuova.
