= Museu da Água =

Coordinates: 38.7192°N 9.1192°W

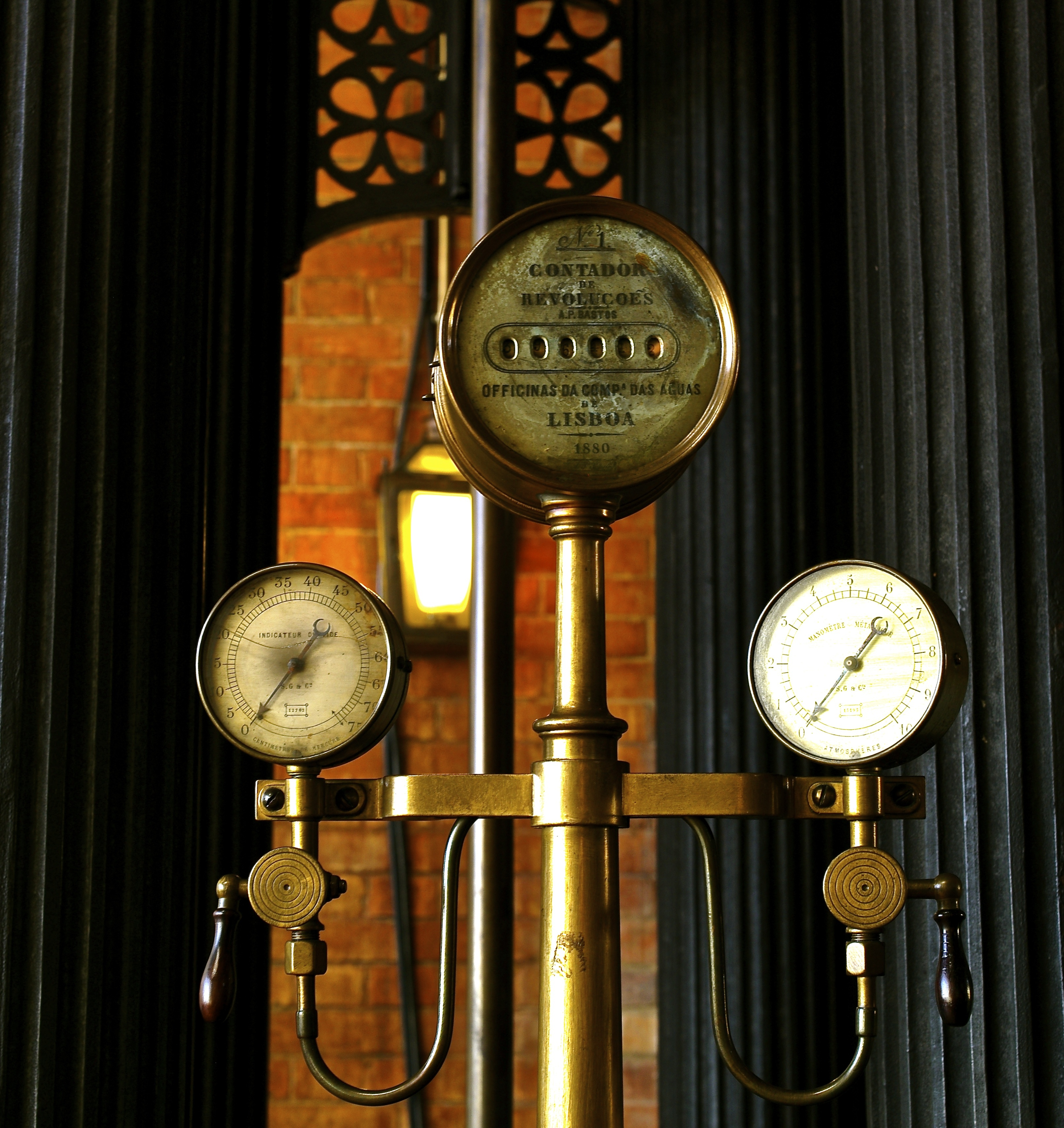
Water Museum, old gauges

The Museu da Água (Water Museum) is a museum located in Lisbon, Portugal, primarily focusing on the subject of Lisbon's water supply infrastructure.

== History ==
The museum is spread across a group of buildings which managed the water supply for the city of Lisbon across the 18th and 19th century.

The main museum building stands next to the Mãe de Agua das Amoreiras reservoir, built in 1746 by architect Carlos Mardel. The reservoir contains a water tank with a depth of 7.5m, capable of holding 5500m³ of water. Visitors are able to climb to the roof of the reservoir to see a panoramic view of the city.

The museum collection itself is located in the former steam pumping station of Barbadinhos, built in 1880, which is in a 19th-century industrial building. The museum features four large steam engines dating from 1876. One has been reconditioned as a working demonstration. The pumps were in use until 1928. The building also has a chimney, with a height of 40m.

The museum also features portions of Lisbon's 1746 Águas Livres aqueduct, which has a total length of 58km, being made up of 109 stone arches. The tallest section of the aqueduct is 65m high. The entire aqueduct survived the 1755 Lisbon Earthquake.

In 1990 the museum was awarded the Council of Europe Museum Prize.

The museum focuses on teaching about the framework of the water supply to the city of Lisbon, as well as sustainable water technology and environmental awareness.
