= Estaus Palace =

Coordinates: 38.7148°N 9.1398°W

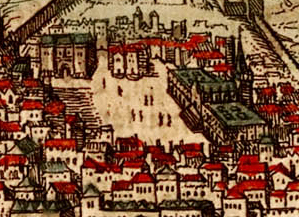
Rossio Square in a 16th-century map. Estaus Palace is the large building in the upper left corner of the square.

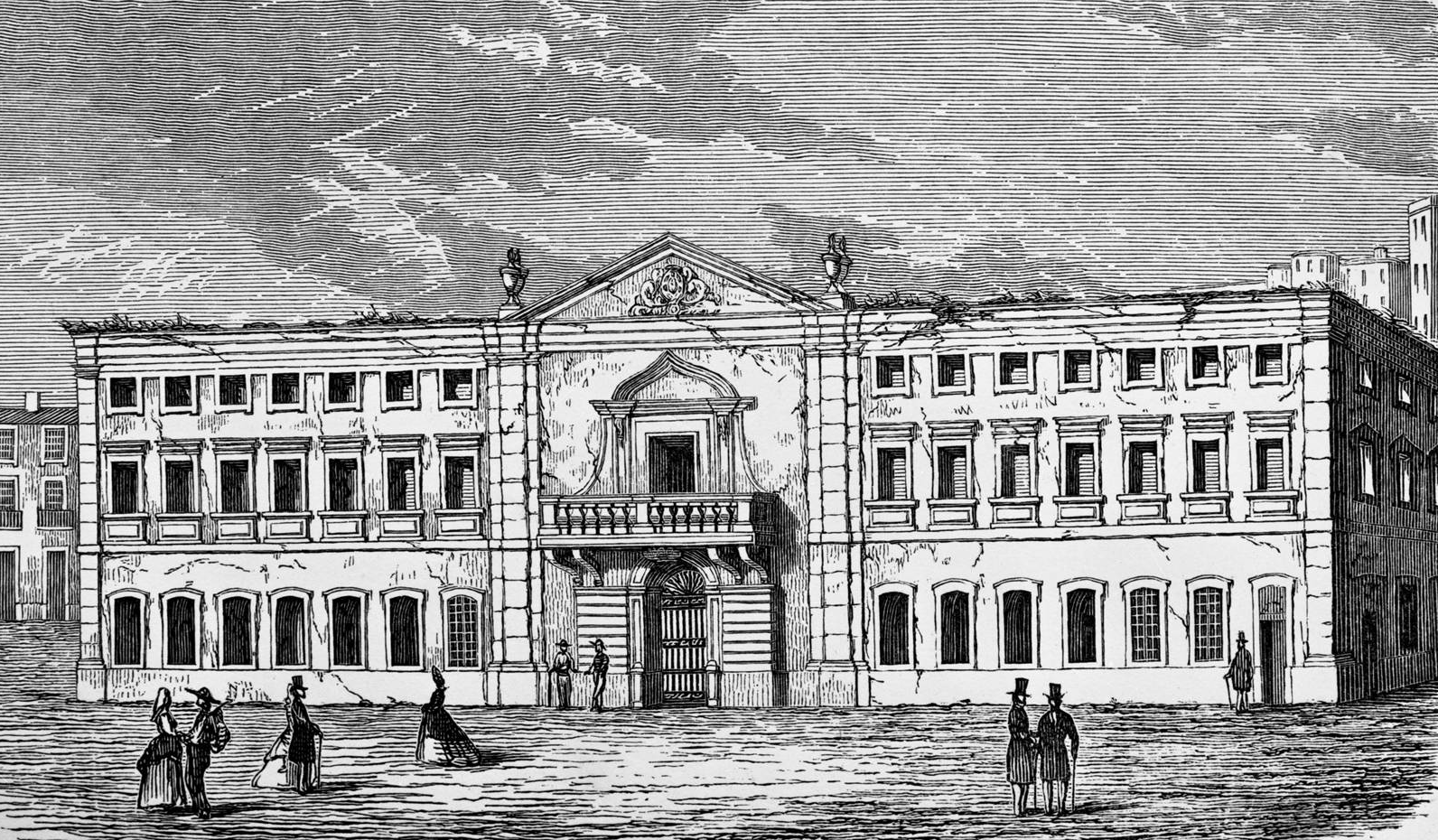
Baroque-style Inquisition Palace before burning in 1836.

The Estaus Palace (Portuguese: Paço dos Estaus; Palácio dos Estaus) in Rossio Square, in Lisbon, was the headquarters of the Portuguese Inquisition. The original palace was built on the north side of the square around 1450 as lodging for foreign dignitaries and noblemen visiting Lisbon.

== Portuguese Inquisition ==
In 1536, during the reign of King John III, the Inquisition was installed in Portugal, and the palace eventually became the seat of the institution. The palace had a prison and tribunal where the accused of heresy, witchcraft, and, particularly of secretly practising the Jewish faith (New Christians), were subjected to trial, persecution, torture, and execution. Rossio square and nearby St. Domingos square were frequently used as setting for public executions. The first official auto-da-fé took place in 1540.

Among the thousands of people accused by the Inquisition and held in the prison of the Estaus are important personalities like historian Damião de Góis, poet Manuel Maria Barbosa du Bocage and dramatist António José da Silva, nicknamed "the Jew", executed by the Inquisition in 1737.

The Inquisition Palace was heavily damaged in the catastrophic 1755 Lisbon earthquake, but was rebuilt under designs by Carlos Mardel. This building was destroyed by fire in 1836. The Inquisition was not abolished in Portugal until 1821.

== Teatro Nacional D. Maria II ==
Thanks to the efforts of writer Almeida Garrett, the palace was replaced in 1842 by the Teatro Nacional D. Maria II, built to a Neoclassical design by Italian architect Fortunato Lodi. The theatre stands today on the site of the old Estaus Palace. A statue of Renaissance Portuguese playwright Gil Vicente is located over the pediment of the theatre. Ironically, some of Gil Vicente's plays had been censured by the Inquisition in the late 16th century.
