= Praça da Figueira =

Public square in Lisbon, Portugal

Coordinates: 38°42′46″N 9°08′20″W

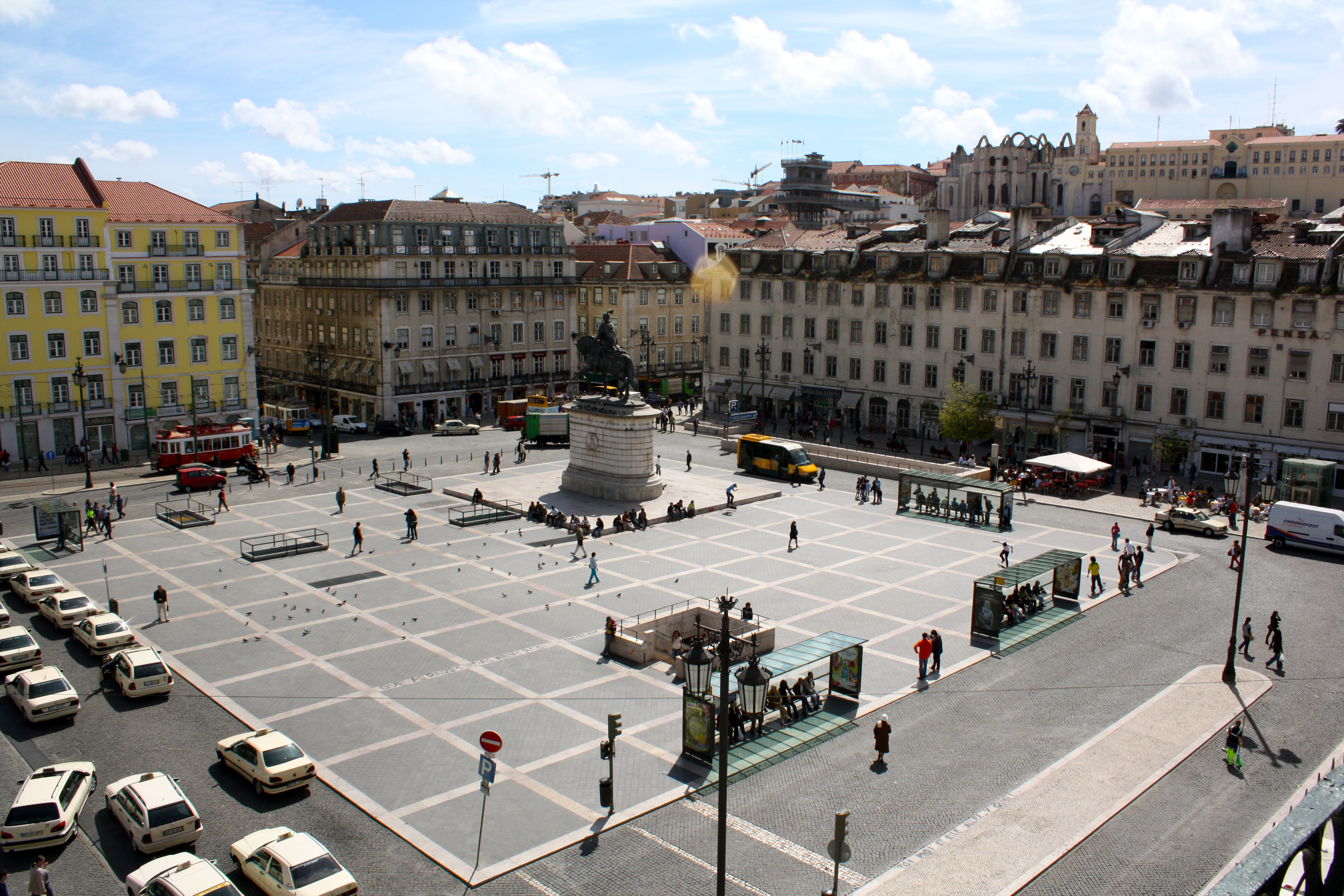
Praça da Figueira.

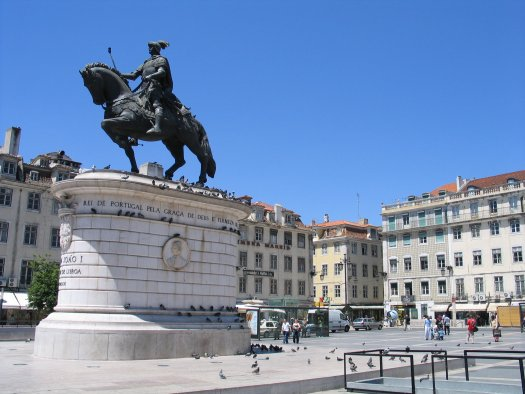
Equestrian statue of King John I in the Praça da Figueira

The Praça da Figueira (Portuguese: [ˈpɾasɐ ðɐ fiˈɣɐjɾɐ], Square of the Fig Tree) is a large square in the centre of Lisbon, in Portugal. It is part of the Lisbon Baixa, the area of the city reurbanised after the 1755 Lisbon earthquake.

In the 16th century the square did not exist, and most of its area was occupied by the Hospital Real de Todos os Santos (All-Saints Royal Hospital), the most important in the city. In 1755, after the great earthquake which destroyed most of Lisbon, the hospital was greatly damaged. It was demolished around 1775.

The large area previously occupied by the hospital in the Baixa was turned into an open market square. Around 1885, a large covered market of 8,000 m^{2} was built. This market existed until 1949, when it was demolished. Since then the square has been an open space.

In 1971 a bronze equestrian statue representing King John I (1357–1433), by sculptor Leopoldo de Almeida, was inaugurated in the square. The monument also carries medallions with the effigies of Nuno Álvares Pereira and João das Regras, two key characters in the 1385 Revolution that brought John I to power.

In 1999/2000, during the last renovation of the square, the statue was relocated from the middle to a corner of the square, in order to make it visible from the Praça do Comércio. The original renovation project also called for the buildings to be completely covered with ceramic tiles (azulejos) by Daciano Costa, which has not been done.

The Praça da Figueira has a very uniform profile, with four-storey buildings dating from the rebuilding of the Baixa Pombalina. The buildings are occupied by hotels, cafés, and several shops. It is also an important traffic hub, with bus and metro stops.

== See also ==
- Baixa Pombalina
- Hospital Real de Todos os Santos

== References and external links ==
- History of Praça da Figueira (Lisbon Municipality, in Portuguese)
- Blog page with the history and old photos of Praça da Figueira (in Portuguese).
- Itinerario Lisbonense (in Portuguese). 1818 [1804].
