= Lisbon Baixa =

Neighbourhood of Lisbon, Portugal

Coordinates: 38°42′41″N 9°8′14″W

Baixa Baixa Pombalina
- Neighborhood
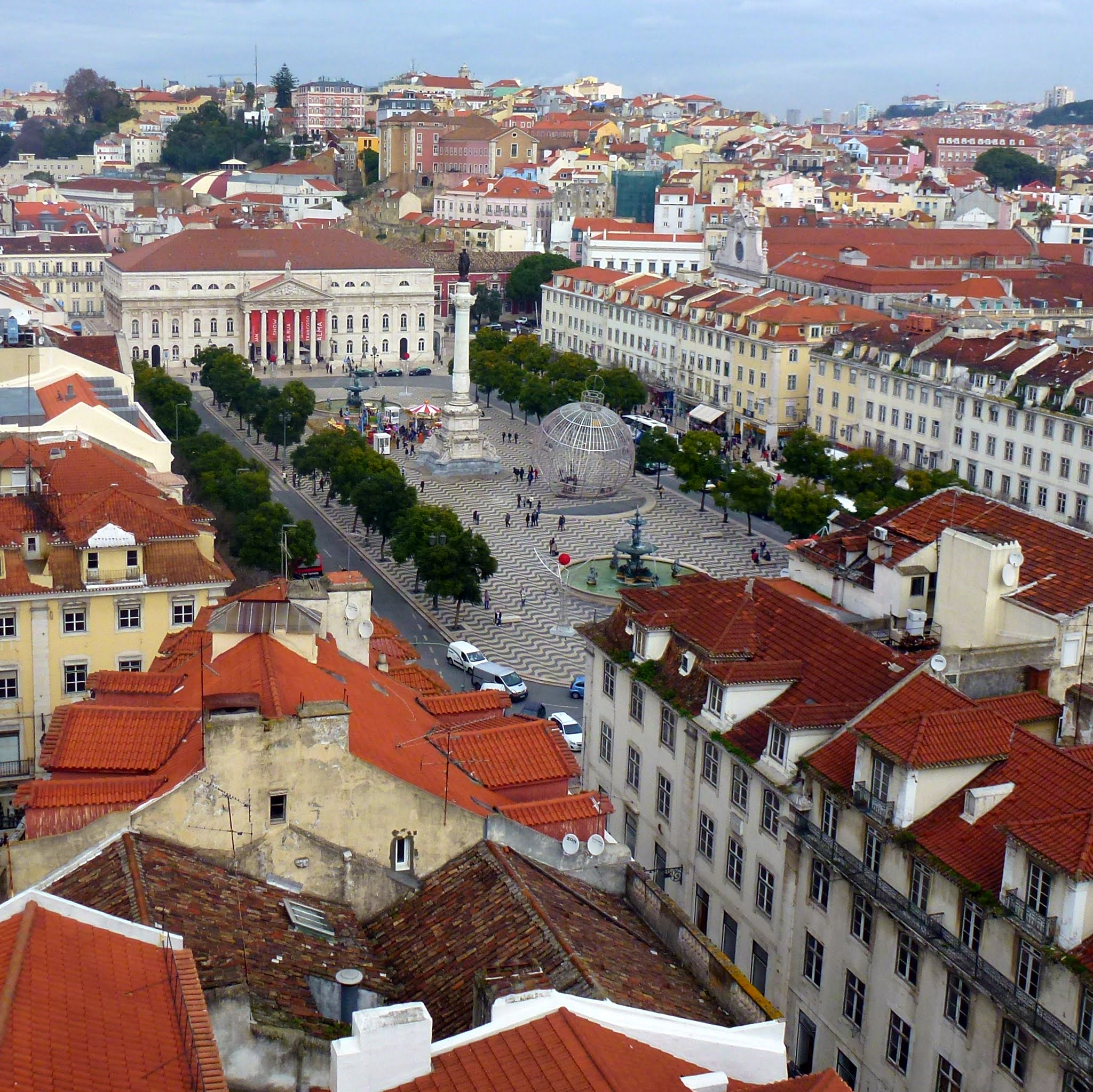
- Interactive map of Baixa
- Municipality: Lisbon
- Freguesia: Santa Maria Maior
- Foundation: 1755

The Baixa ("Downtown"), also known as the Baixa Pombalina (IPA: [ˈbajʃɐ põbɐˈlinɐ]; "Pombaline Downtown"), is a neighbourhood in the historic centre of Lisbon, Portugal. It consists of the grid of streets north of the Praça do Comércio, roughly between the Cais do Sodré and the Alfama district beneath the Lisbon Castle, and extends northwards towards the Rossio and Figueira squares and the Avenida da Liberdade, a tree-lined boulevard noted for its tailoring shops and cafes.

== History ==
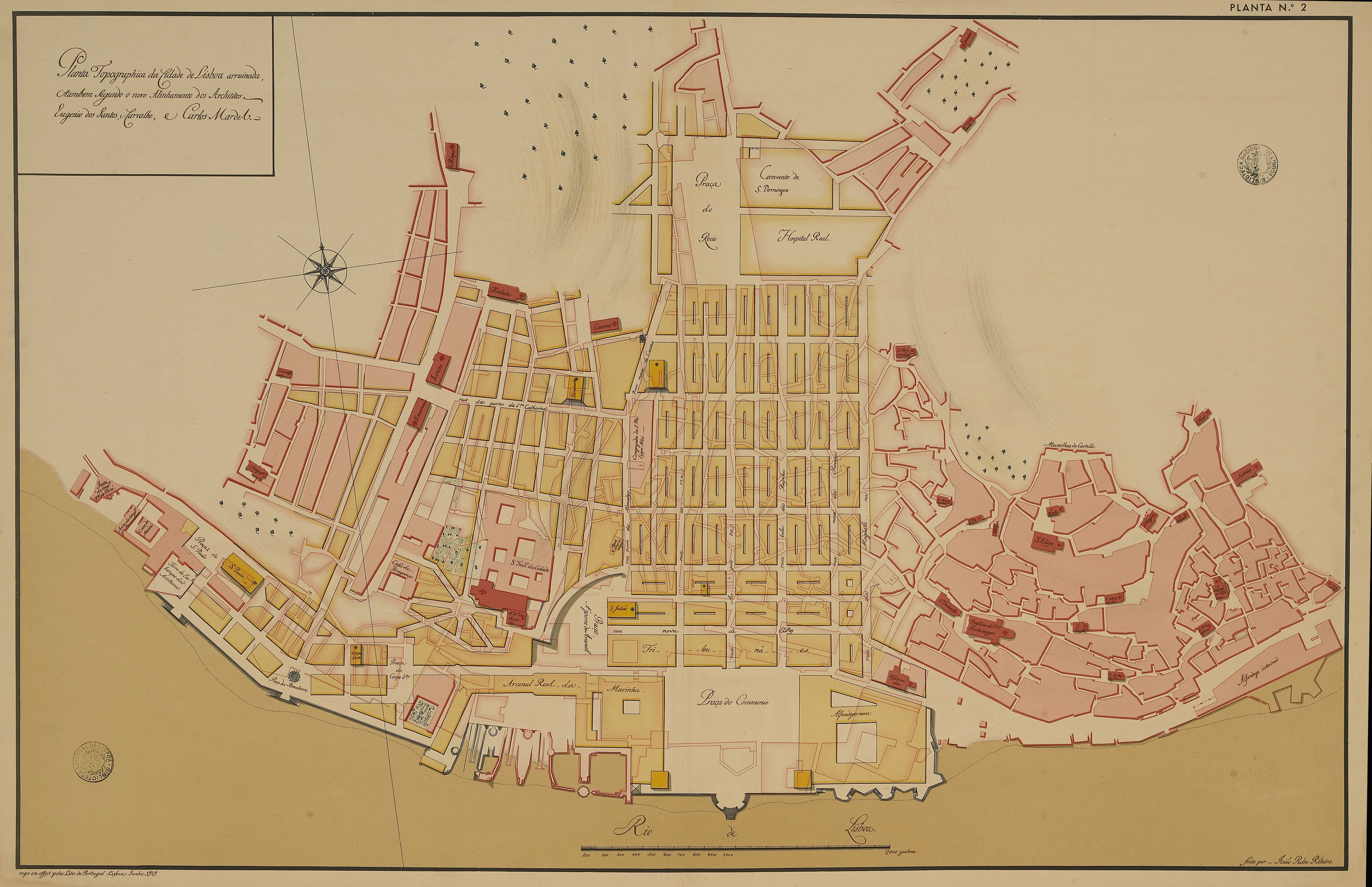
Plan of reconstruction after the 1755 Lisbon earthquake by Eugénio dos Santos and Carlos Mardel.

The Pombaline Baixa is an elegant district, primarily constructed after the 1755 Lisbon earthquake. It takes its name from the 1st Marquis of Pombal, the prime minister to Joseph I of Portugal from 1750 to 1777 and key figure of the Enlightenment in Portugal, who took the lead in ordering the rebuilding of Lisbon after the 1755 earthquake. The Marquis of Pombal imposed strict conditions on rebuilding the city, and the current grid pattern strongly differs from the organic streetplan that characterised the district before the earthquake.

The Pombaline Baixa is one of the first examples of earthquake-resistant construction. Architectural models were tested by having troops march around them to simulate an earthquake. Notable features of Pombaline structures include the Pombaline cage, a symmetrical wood-lattice framework aimed at distributing earthquake force, and inter-terrace walls that are built higher than roof timbers to reduce fire contagion.

It was placed on Portugal's "tentative list" of potential World Heritage Sites on 7 December 2004, which declares it superior to the planned areas in Edinburgh, Turin, and London; in particular, the submission states that the plans for the reconstruction of London after the Great Fire in 1666 "does not implement overall principles" like those achieved in the Pombaline.

== Landmarks ==
- Praça do Comércio
- Rossio
- Praça da Figueira
- Restauradores Square
