= Monument to Pedro IV (Porto) =

Monument in Porto, Portugal

Monument to King Pedro IV
- Monumento a D. Pedro IV (Portuguese)
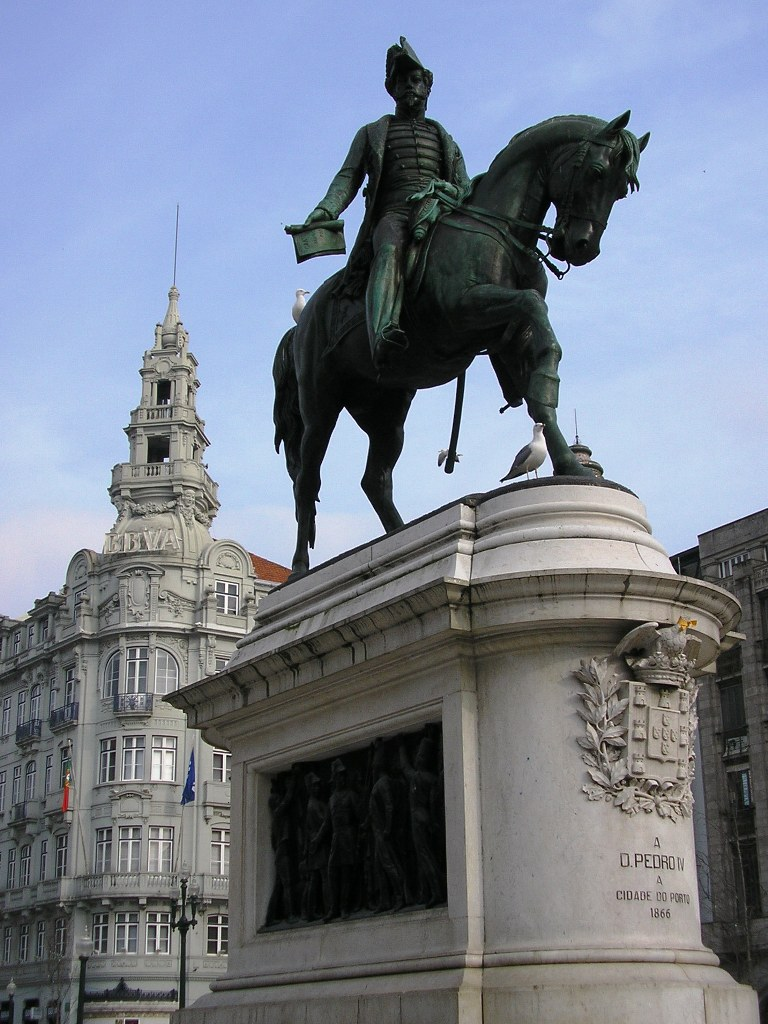
- The Monument to King Pedro IV, in Porto
- Interactive map of Monument to King Pedro IV
- 41°08′47″N 8°36′41″W
- Location: Liberdade Square, Porto, Portugal

The monument to King Pedro IV (Portuguese: Monumento a D. Pedro IV) is located in the Liberdade Square in Porto, Portugal.

== Details ==
The bronze statue on a top of a high column (10 meters) of lioz stone was made of 5 tons of bronze by Célestin Anatole Calmels (sculpture) and Joaquim da Costa Lima (architecture). The column features two-sided pedestal stands which depict the delivery of Pedro’s heart to the representatives of Porto and landing at Mindelo where Pedro IV gave the flag to Tomás de Melo Breyner. These two low-reliefs were originally made of Carrara marble, and they have been replaced with bronze duplicates for protection purposes. The coats of arms of Bragança and Porto have been depicted on the front and back sides of the column and surrounded with oak and bay leaves.

The statue was fused in Belgium and it describes Pedro (in a military uniform on horseback) presenting the constitutional charter (on his right hand) to Porto. The monument was inaugurated in October 1866. It has been classified as Property of Public Interest since 1982.

== Gallery ==
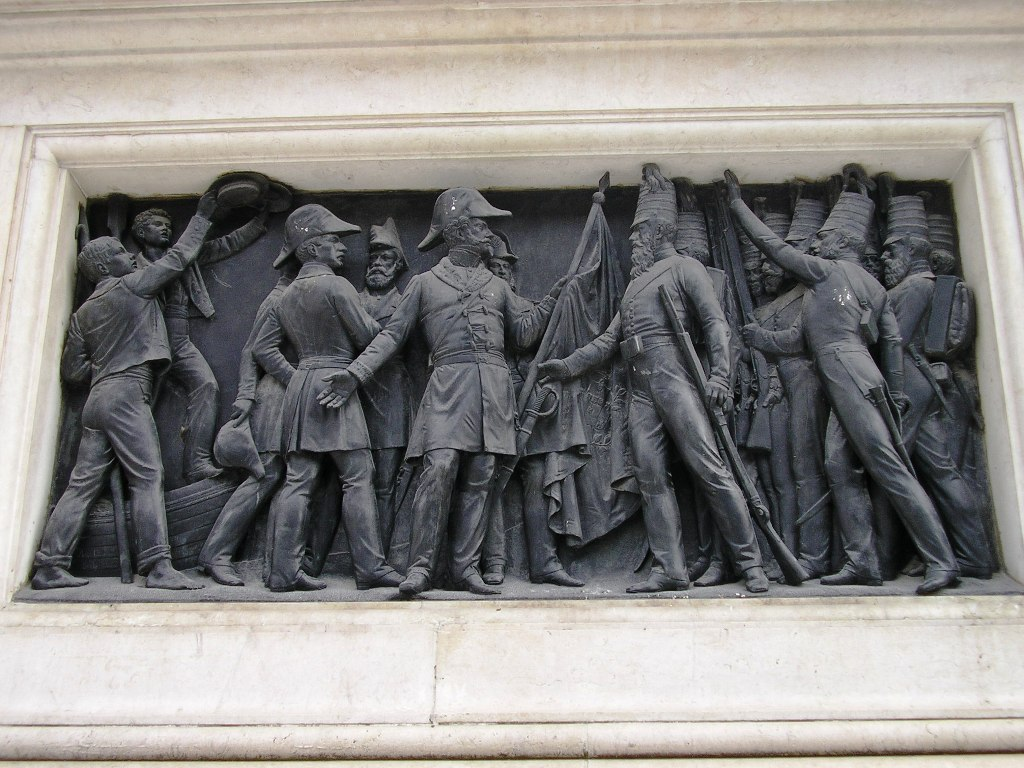
Low-relief displaying landing at Mindelo

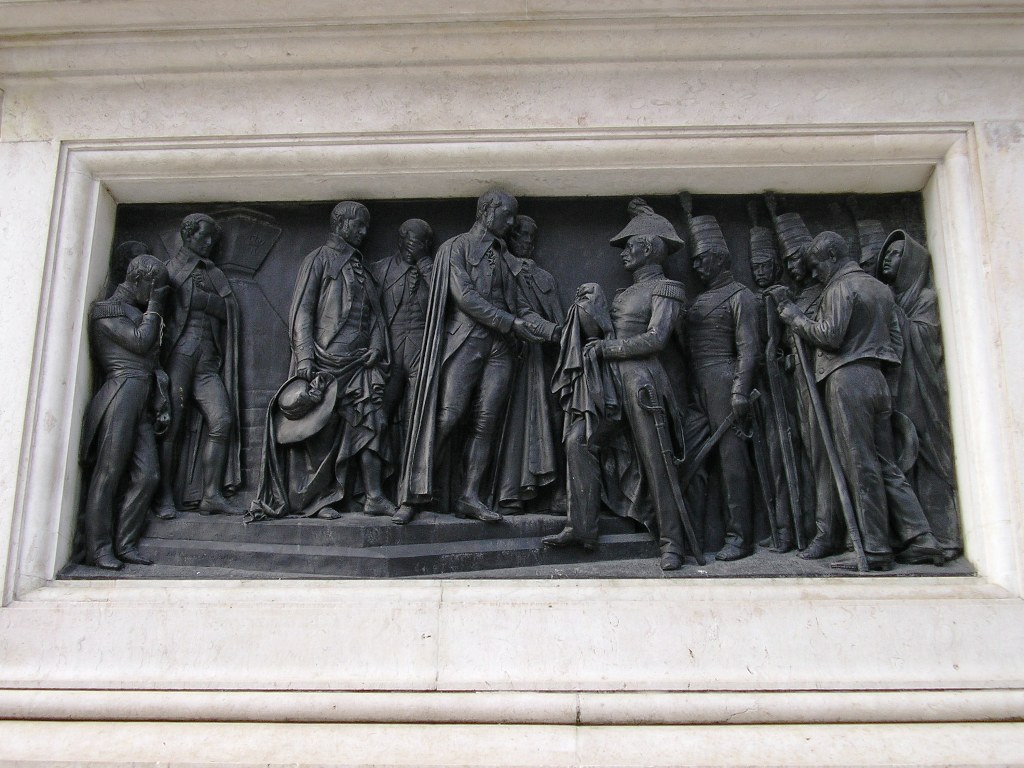
Low-relief displaying the delivery of Pedro’s heart

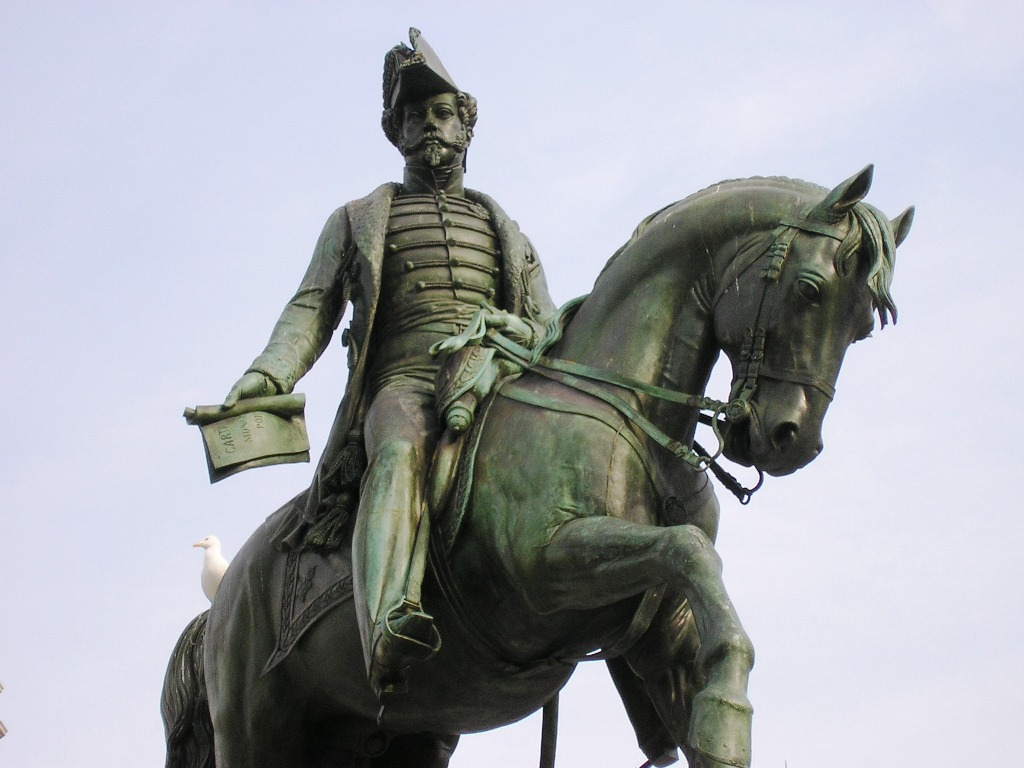
Statue of Pedro IV presenting constitutional charter

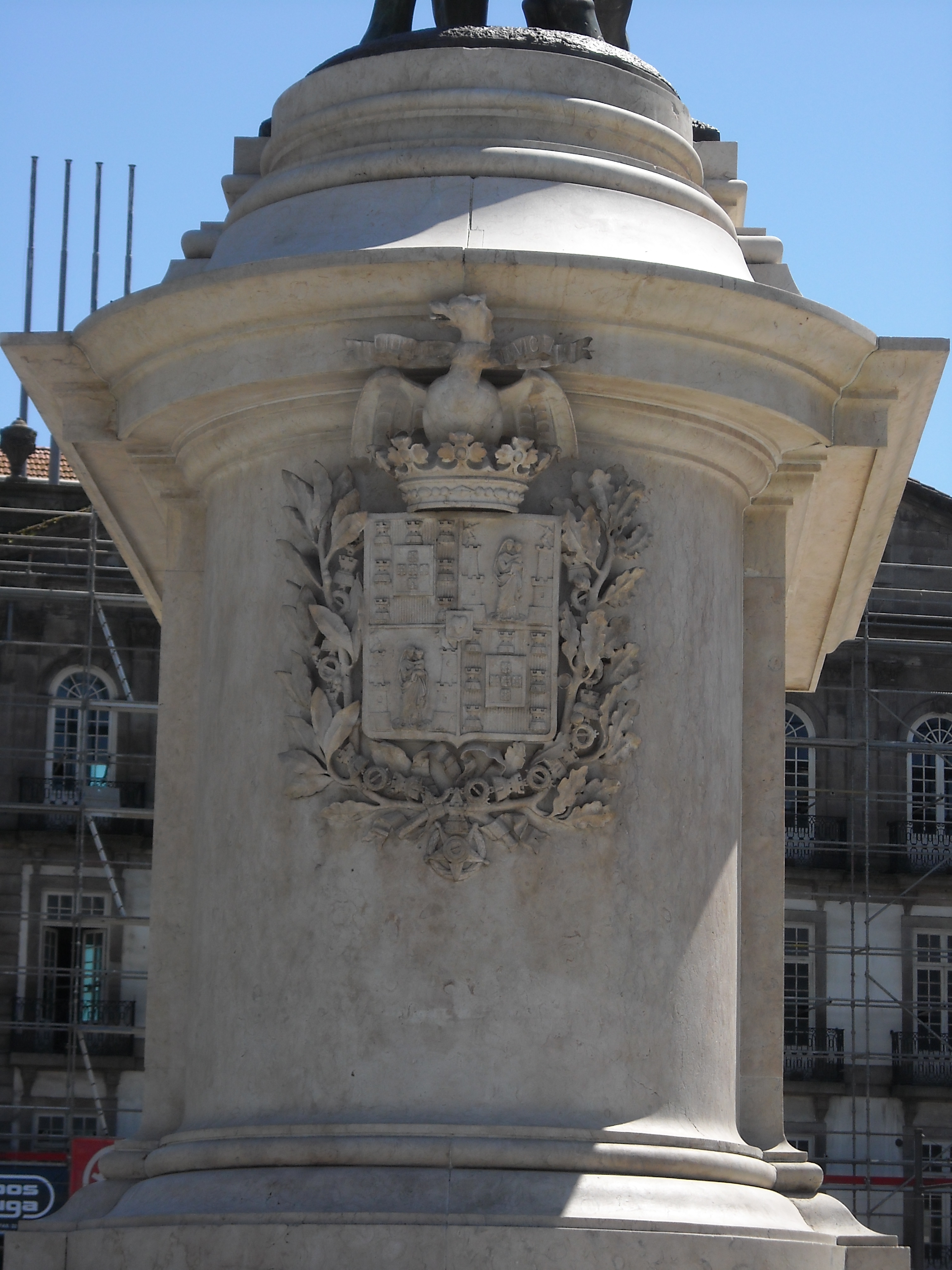
Back side of the pedestal

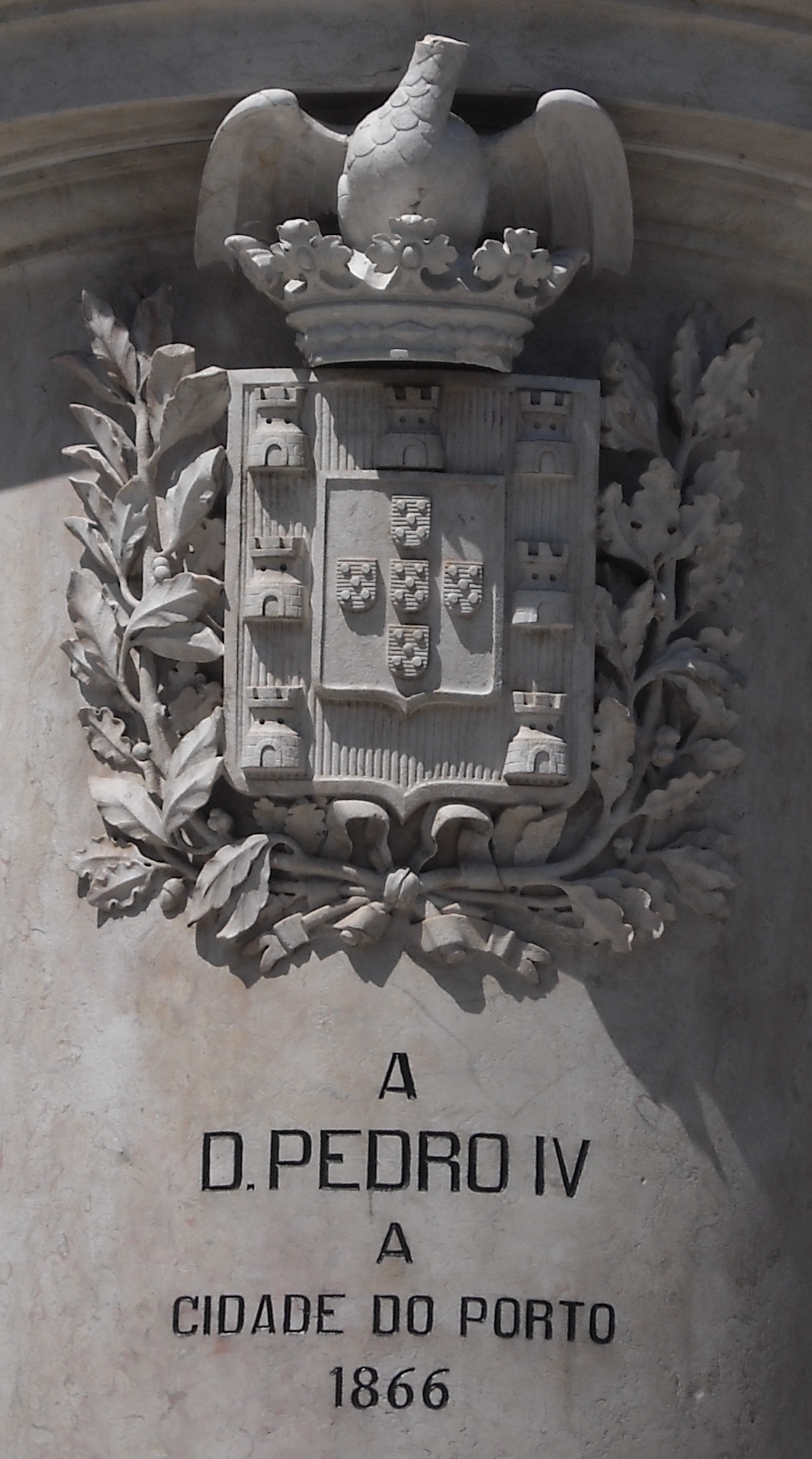
Front side of the pedestal

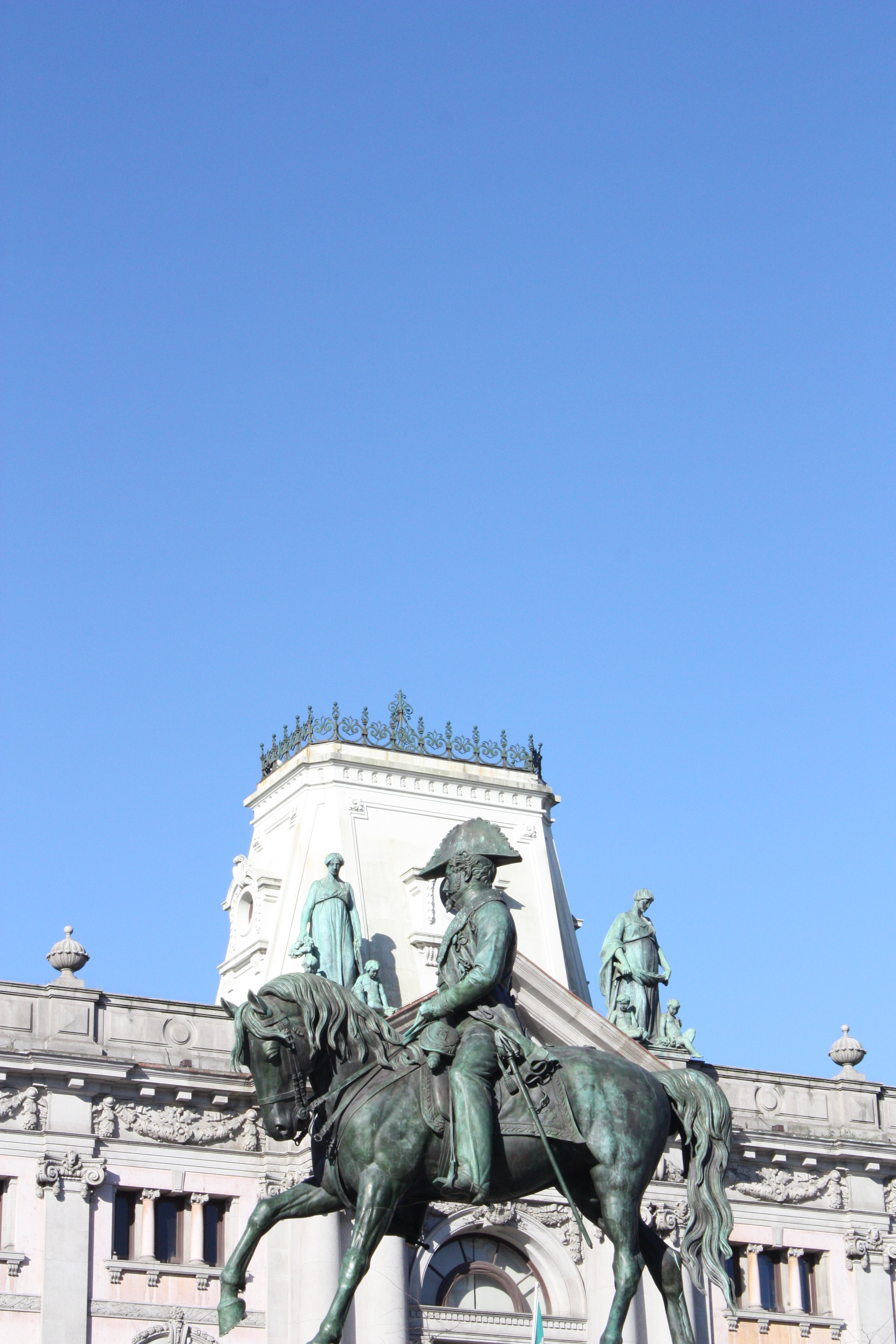
Left side of the Statue of King Pedro IV

== See also ==
- Landing at Mindelo
- National Monuments of Portugal
- Liberdade Square (Porto)
