= Carlos Mardel =

Hungarian-Portuguese military officer, engineer, architect

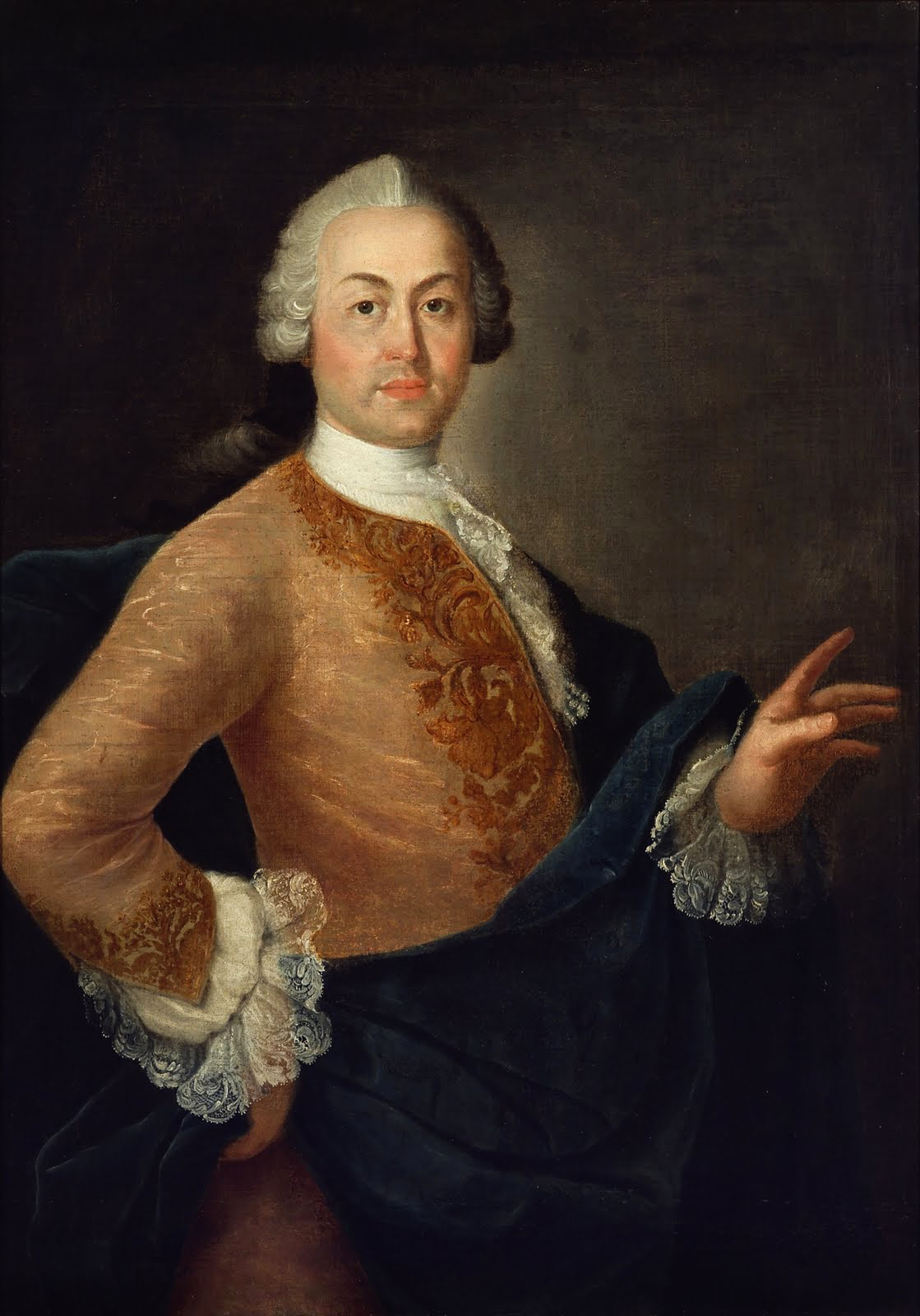
- Portrait, circa 1760.
- Born: Martell Károly c. 1695; Pozsony, Kingdom of Hungary
- Died: 8 September 1763 (aged 67–68); Lisbon, Kingdom of Portugal
- Occupation: Architect

Carlos Mardel (born Martell Károly; Pozsony; c. 1695 – Lisbon; 8 September 1763) was a Hungarian-Portuguese military officer, engineer, and architect. Mardel is primarily remembered for his role in the reconstruction effort after the 1755 Lisbon earthquake.

== Career ==
Carlos Mardel was born Martell Károly, in Pozsony (now Bratislava), then in the Kingdom of Hungary, around 1695. He served in the militaries of the Polish–Lithuanian Commonwealth and the Kingdom of Great Britain.

Mardel first came to Portugal in 1733, as a sergeant-major of engineering for a Portuguese infantry. By 1735, Mardel had become the managing architect of the Águas Livres Aqueduct. In this project, he personally designed and oversaw the construction of the Amoreiras Monumental Arch and the Mãe d'Água Water Reserve.

It is known that Mardel was a part of the Portuguese Freemason lodge Casa Real dos Pedreiros Livres da Lusitânia, which operated between 1733 and 1738.

In 1747, owing to his work on the Águas Livres water system, Mardel was appointed Architect of the Royal Household and of the Ancient Military Orders.

Following the 1755 Lisbon earthquake, Mardel was one of the primary architects responsible for the city's reconstruction, alongside Eugénio dos Santos and Manuel da Maia. His roofing designs became a staple of the city's reconstruction.

In 1759, Mardel began construction on a country manor in Oeiras for Sebastião José de Carvalho e Melo, the prime-minister at the time for King Joseph I of Portugal. The palace, known as the Palace of the Marquis of Pombal, is considered one of his magna opera.

Also, he was involved in reconstructing the Royal Palace of Salvaterra de Magos after the Earthquake. His major addition was adding a court theatre. By 1762, Mardel had reached the rank of colonel in the Portuguese army.

== Works ==
Note: Italicized works were incomplete when Mardel ceased management of them.

- Águas Livre Water System; 1735–1745
  - Águas Livres Aqueduct; 1735–1744
  - Amoreiras Monumental Arch; 1740–1744
  - Arco do Carvalhão; 1742–1745
- Mãe d'Água Water Reserve; 1745–1763
- Chafariz da Esperança; 1752–1763
- Chafariz do Rato; 1753–1754
- Estaus Palace; 1755–?
- Palace of the Marquis of Pombal; 1759–1763
- Monastery of Santa Clara-a-Nova (gate and cloister); 1761
