= Portuguese pavement =

Type of patterned pavement

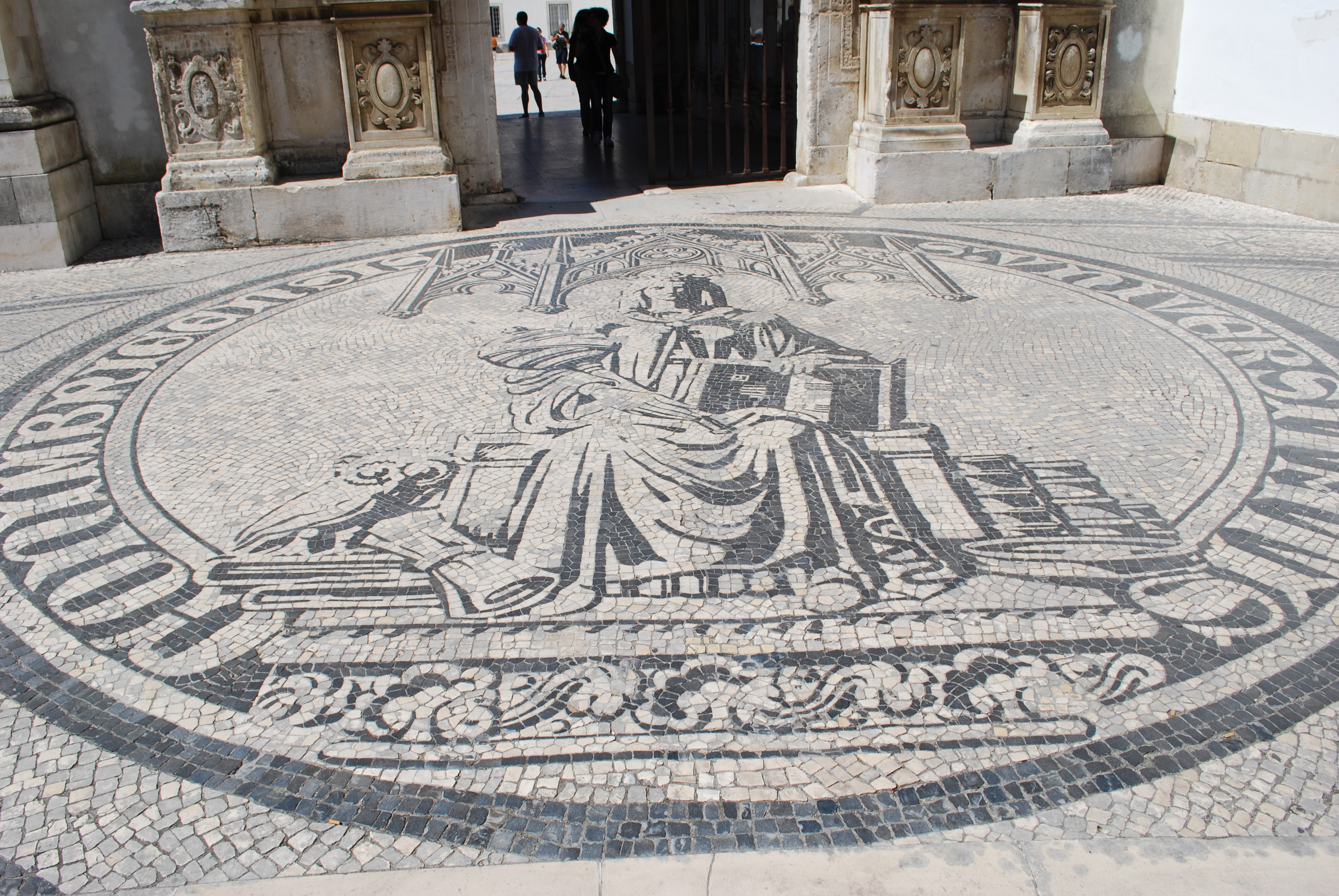
Portuguese pavement: image of the seal of the University of Coimbra, in Portugal, featuring Wisdom

Portuguese pavement, known in Portuguese as calçada portuguesa or simply calçada (or pedra portuguesa in Brazil), is a traditional-style pavement used for many pedestrian areas in Portugal and its former colonies. It consists of small pieces of stone arranged in a pattern or image, like a mosaic. It can also be found in Olivença (a disputed territory administered by Spain) and throughout former Portuguese colonies, especially in Brazil. Portuguese workers are also hired for their skill in creating these pavements in places such as Gibraltar. Being usually used in sidewalks, it is in town squares and atriums that this art finds its deepest expression.

== History ==
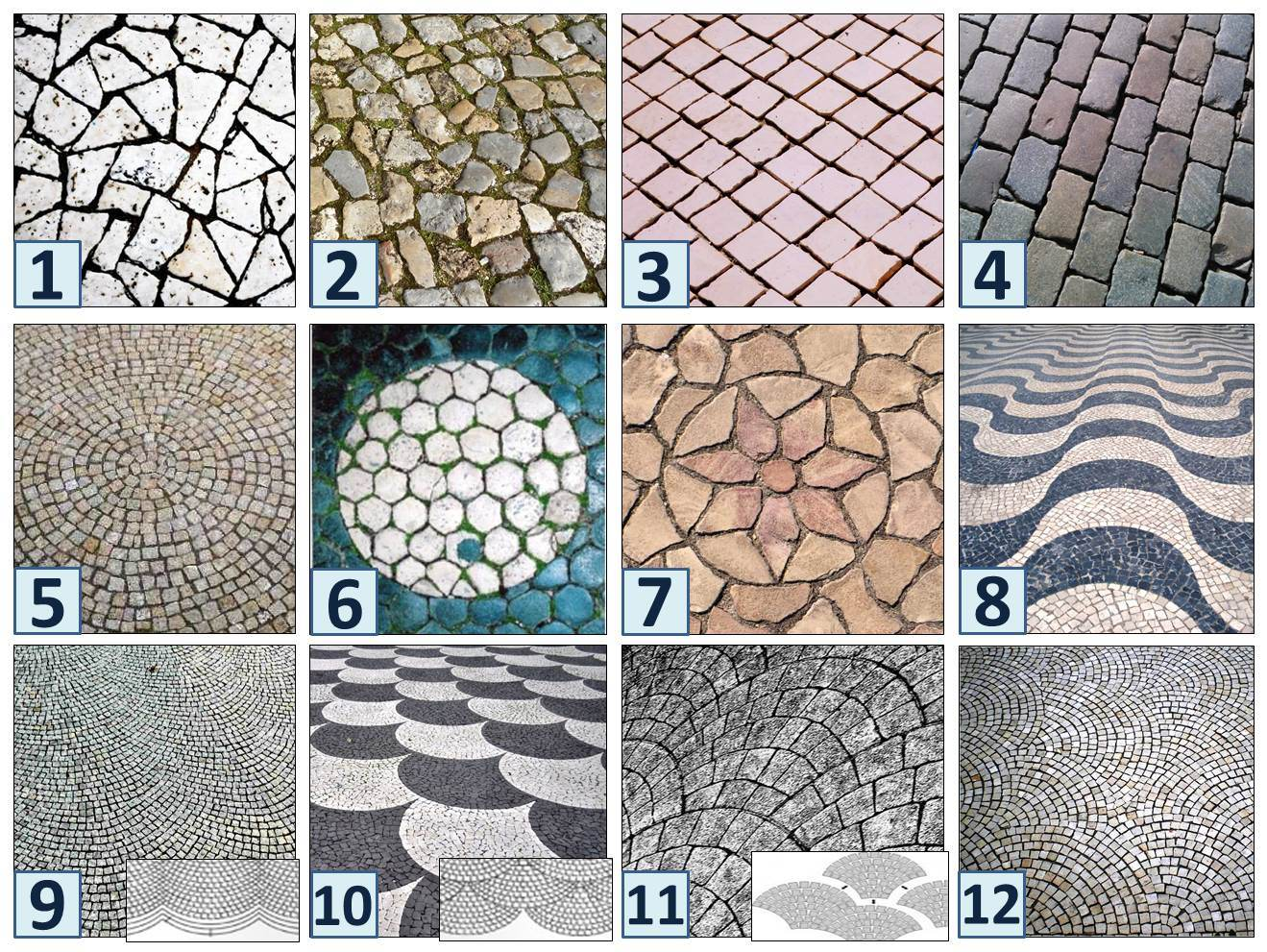
Some styles of Portuguese pavement are: 1. irregular pavements, thought to be the oldest style; 2. crushed pavement, similar but with more spaces between the stones; 3. classic style, with one primary diagonal and one secondary, both at 45 degrees to the adjoining kerb and/or wall.; 4. linear pavement, with stones aligned in parallel files; 5. circular pavement; 6. hexagonal pavement; 7. artistic pavement, with specific forms and/or highly contrasting stones; 8. large wavy pattern; 9. segmented fans; 10. florentine fans; 11. peacock tails; 12. less regular peacock tails

Paving as a craft is believed to have originated in Mesopotamia, where rocky materials were used on the inside and outside of constructions, being later brought to ancient Greece and ancient Rome.

The Romans used to pave the vias connecting the empire using materials to be found in the surroundings. Some of the Roman techniques introduced then are still applied to the calçada, most noticeably the use of a foundation and surfacing.

In its current form, Portuguese pavement was first used in Lisbon from 1840 to 1846, during repairs to São Jorge Castle directed by general and engineer Eusebio Pinheiro Furtado. These included the replacement of the castle's courtyards with a zigzag pattern of alternating black and white stones deemed atypical for the time.

In 1848, Pinheiro was put in charge of the renewal of Rossio square, which he paved with a pattern of waves in homage to the sea crossed by Portuguese sailors. From then onward, the calçada began to spread throughout the streets of Lisbon and Portugal as a whole. Much of the motifs and patterns would revolve around the sea and maritime exploration, and the pavement quickly became a symbol of Portuguese culture and identity, also spreading overseas to Portugal's colonies.

Portuguese pavement spread to Spain in the late 19th century, most notably to Barcelona in 1896, where it was used to pave the sides of the Salón de San Juan, with later expansions in 1909 and 1917–1920.

It was not until 1901 when Portuguese pavement was first used in Brazil, in the city of Manaus.

Belo Horizonte followed suit, and then Rio de Janeiro. In Rio, mayor Francisco Pereira Passos was a strong promoter of implementing the calçada as part of the city's urban renewal plan, which was subsequently adopted in the reworking of Avenida Rio Branco, importing calceteiros, designs and even stones from Portugal. The remaining building materials were destined for the newly inaugurated Avenida Atlântica, in its iconic wavy pattern. Portuguese pavement then began to proliferate through Rio.

In the 1940s, the Portuguese calçada began to evolve in line with the principles of the International Style, developing abstract geometric patterns. In Brazil, this pavement was used in many projects directed by modernist architects, in which they blended traditional materials and techniques like the calçada with contemporary design. Roberto Burle Marx applied it to many of his works and conserved it when redesigning Copacabana in the 1970s.

=== Cities ===
Outside of Portugal, the pavement can be found in many former-Portuguese colonies and other cities inspired by the design, such as:

- Macau, China
- Rio de Janeiro, Brazil
- Lagos, Nigeria
- Gibraltar, UK
- Malacca, Malaysia
- Barcelona, Spain

== Future ==
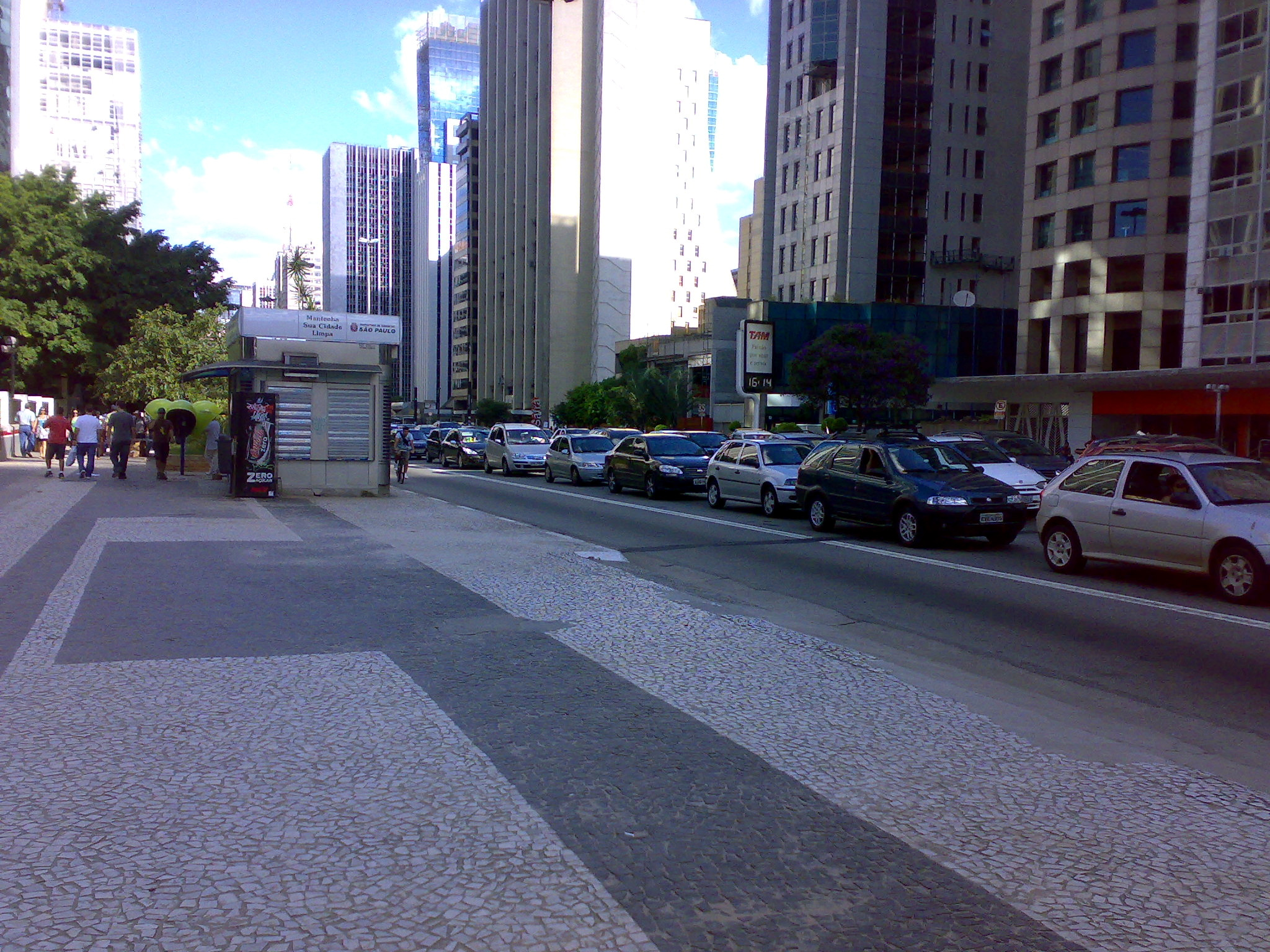
Portuguese pavement in Paulista Avenue, São Paulo in 2008. The pictured section has since been replaced with concrete sidewalks.

In spite of its historical and cultural value, this type of pavement has raised concerns in recent times, particularly in regards to its accessibility. Portuguese pavement has been noted for being particularly slippery, a condition worsened by natural wear and tear as well as by rainy conditions, the latter of which also allows for the formation of puddles in more concave, worn-out sections. Other disadvantages include the propensity for weeds and moss to form in its cracks. The loosening of stones is also a relevant issue, making sidewalks covered by this type of pavement need constant maintenance and repair in order to avoid pedestrians from tripping. These qualities have often made transport for the elderly, wheelchair users, pregnant women and babies in strollers particularly difficult. Portuguese pavement is also especially harsh on some types of footwear.

In Portugal, Porto completely replaced the traditional pavement of its city centre for granite blocks in 2005.

In Brazil, São Paulo has almost completely replaced the Portuguese pavement sidewalks of Paulista Avenue with a cheaper, more regular type of concrete pavement since 2007.

It can also be found around the Asunción Super Centro building in Asunción, Paraguay.

== Technique ==
Craftsmen lay a bedding of gravel upon a well-compacted trench of argillaceous materials, which accommodates the tessera stones, acting as a cement.

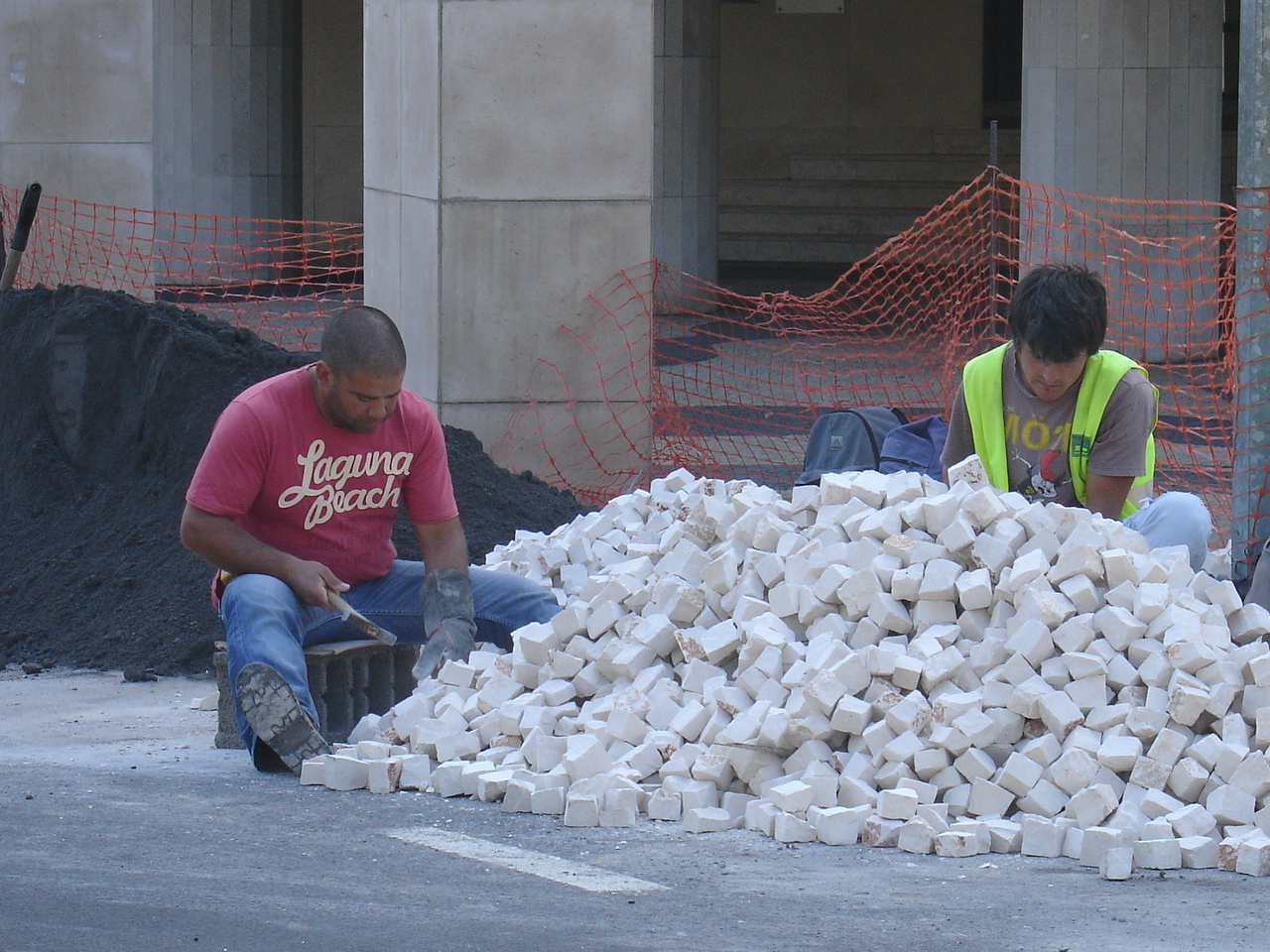
1. Preparation of stones

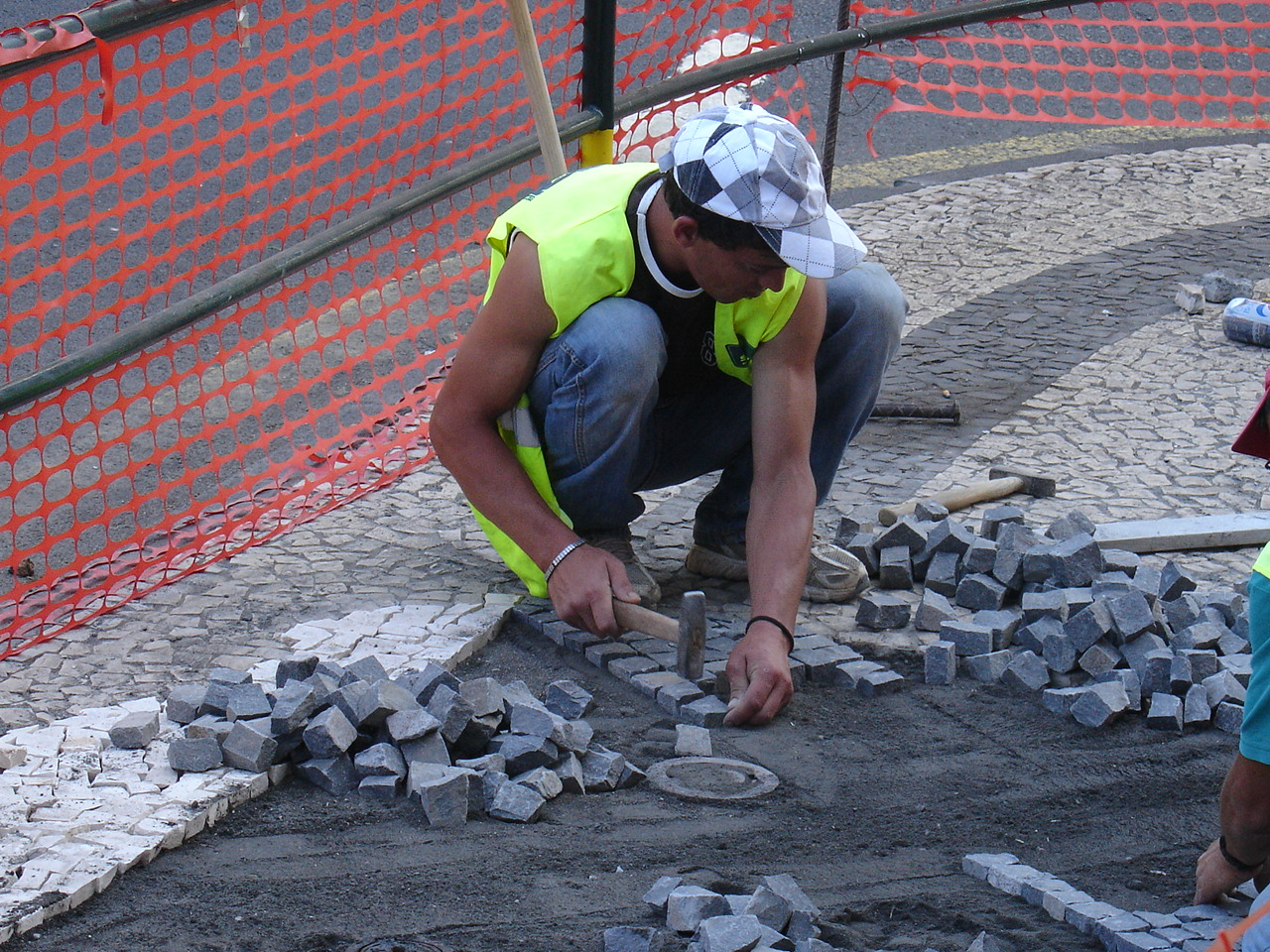
2. Manual placement

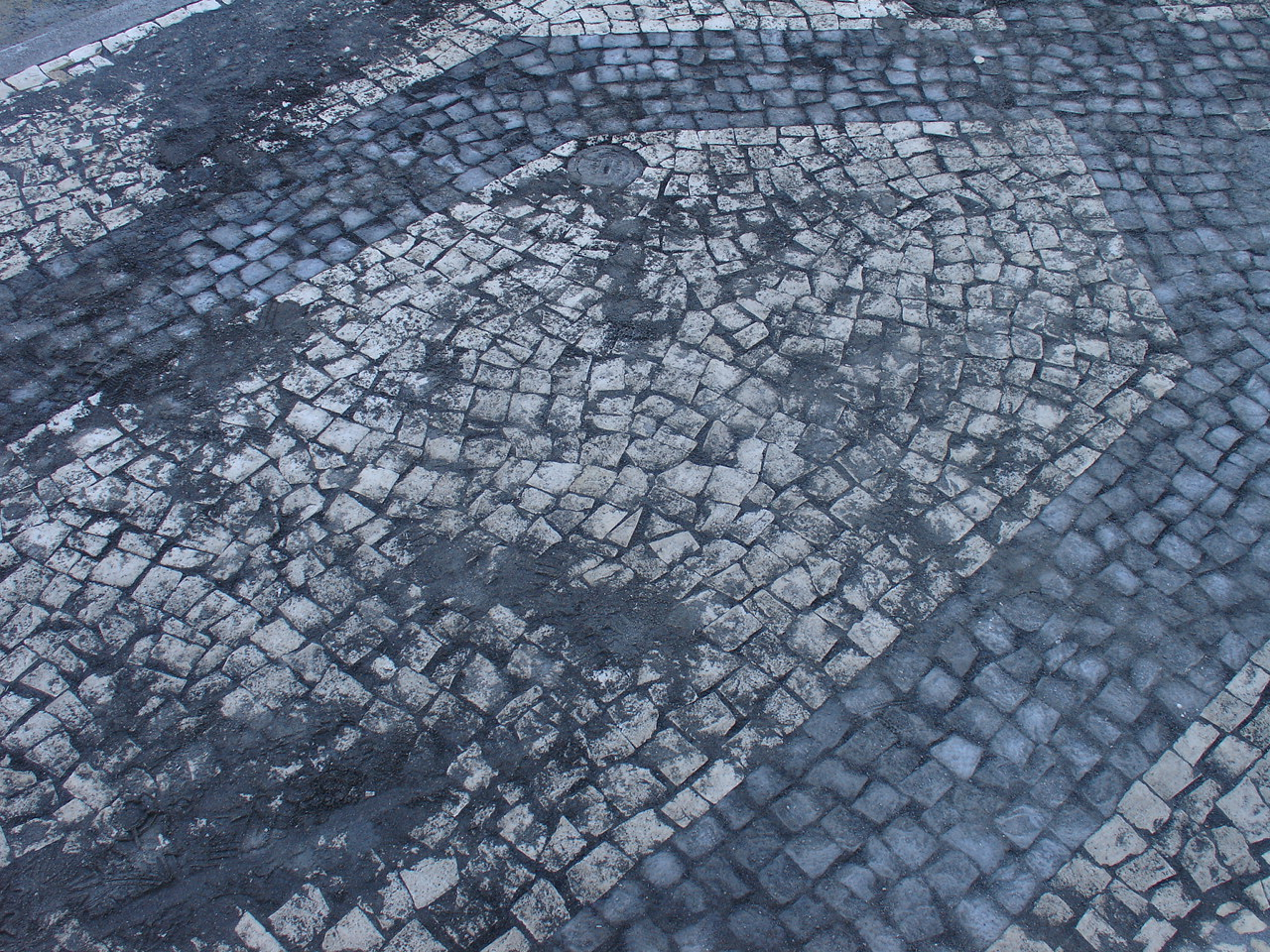
3. Cement mix spread on the pavement

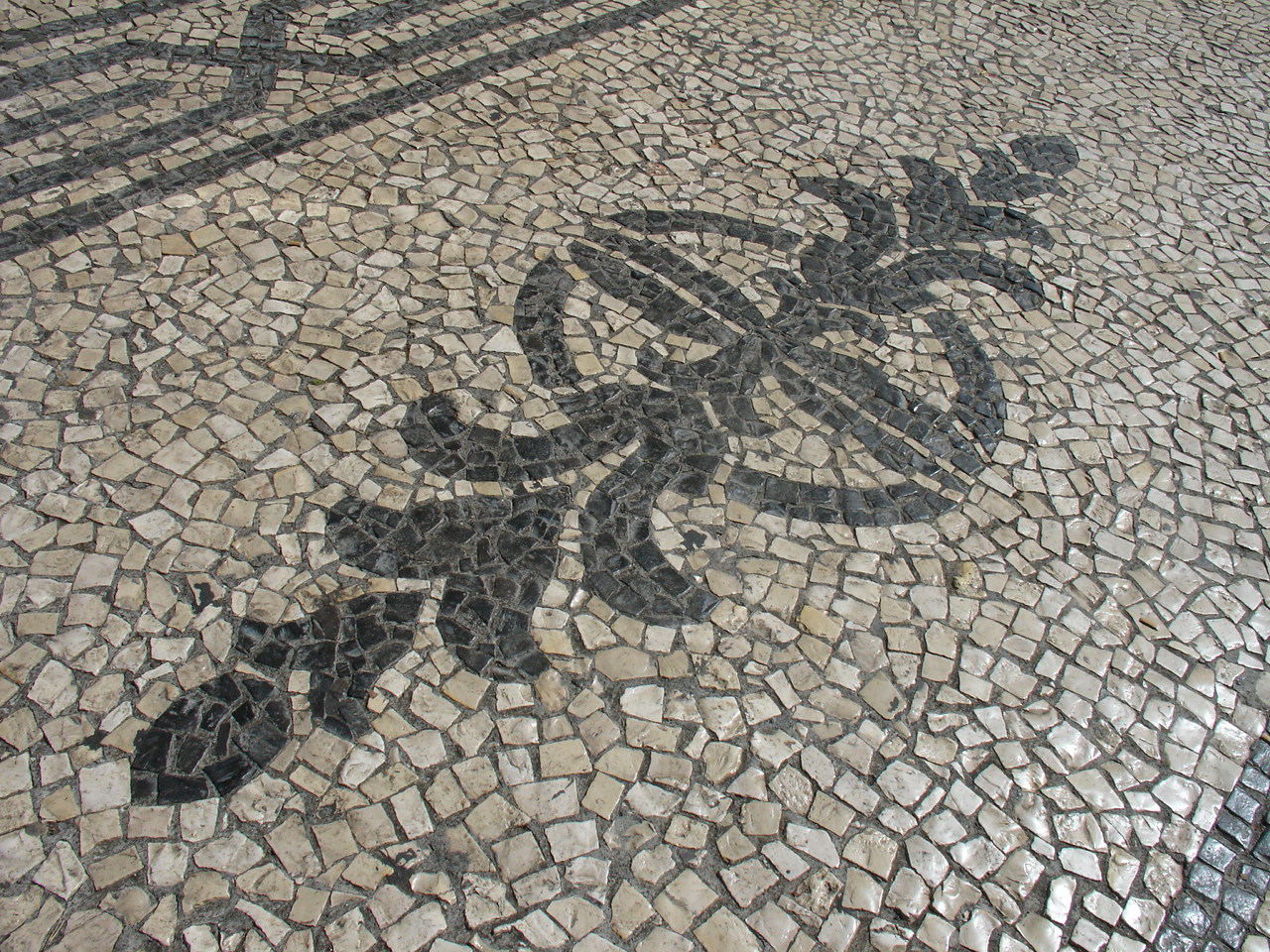
4. Final product

== Calçada as a form of art ==
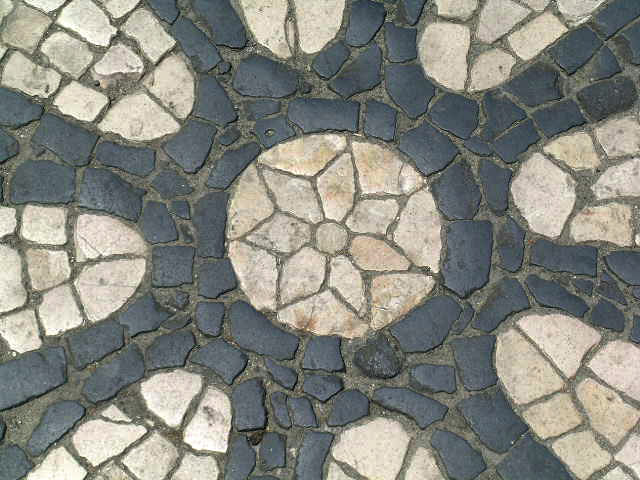
Stars in Lisbon

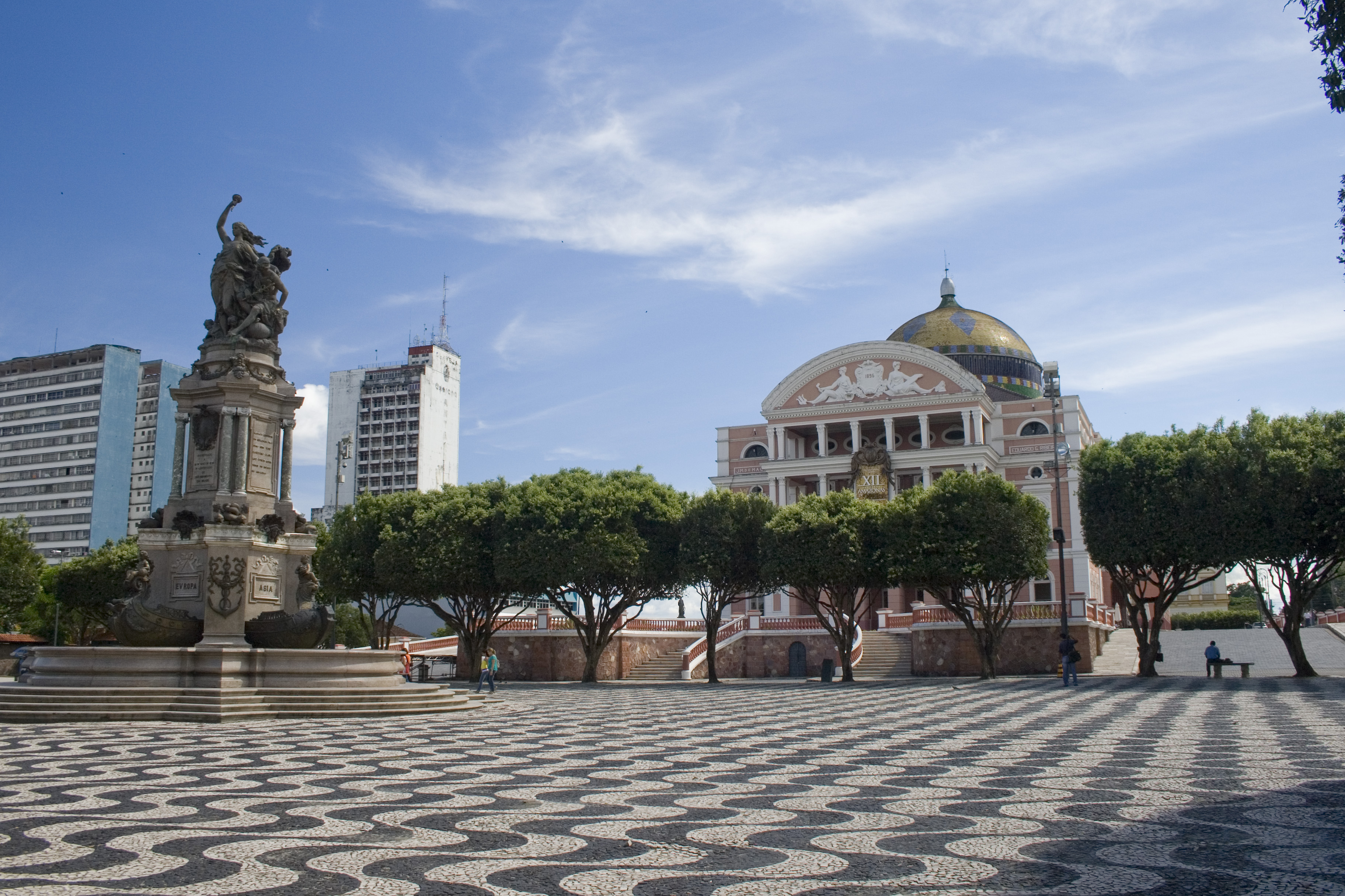
Largo de São Sebastião, the first Portuguese pavement in Brazil, in Manaus.

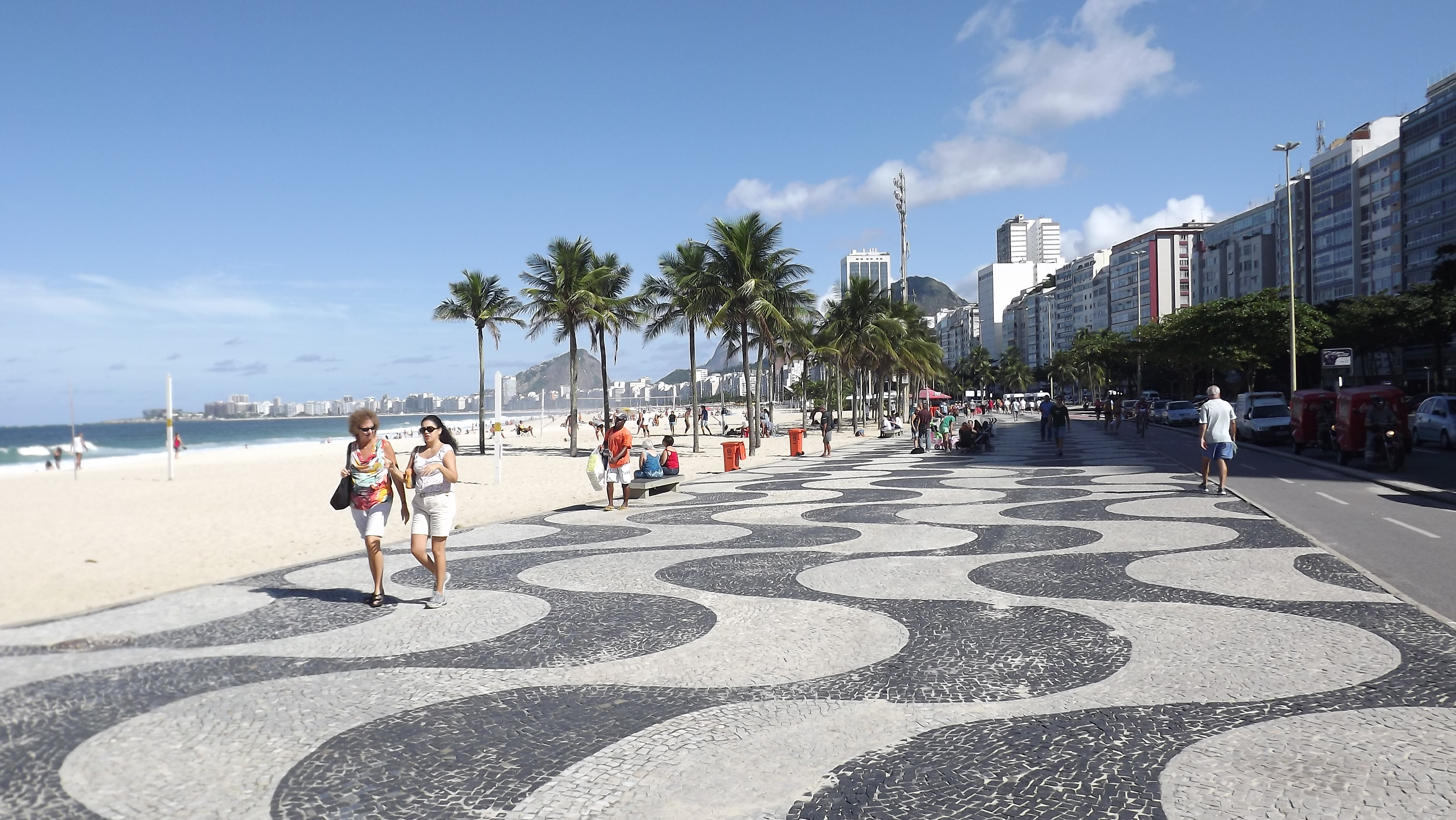
Portuguese pavement in Copacabana Beach, Rio de Janeiro

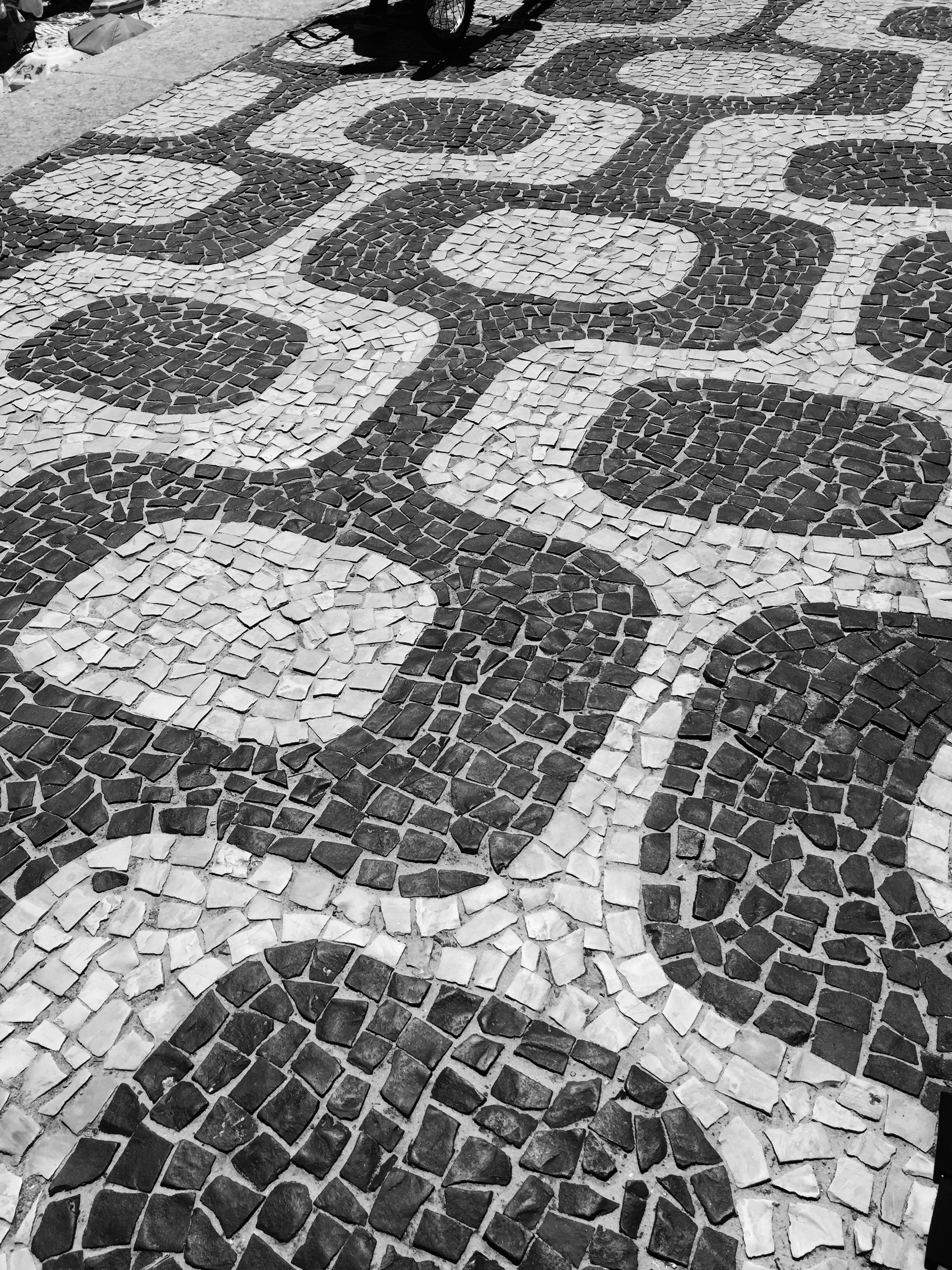
Pavement in Ipanema, Rio de Janeiro

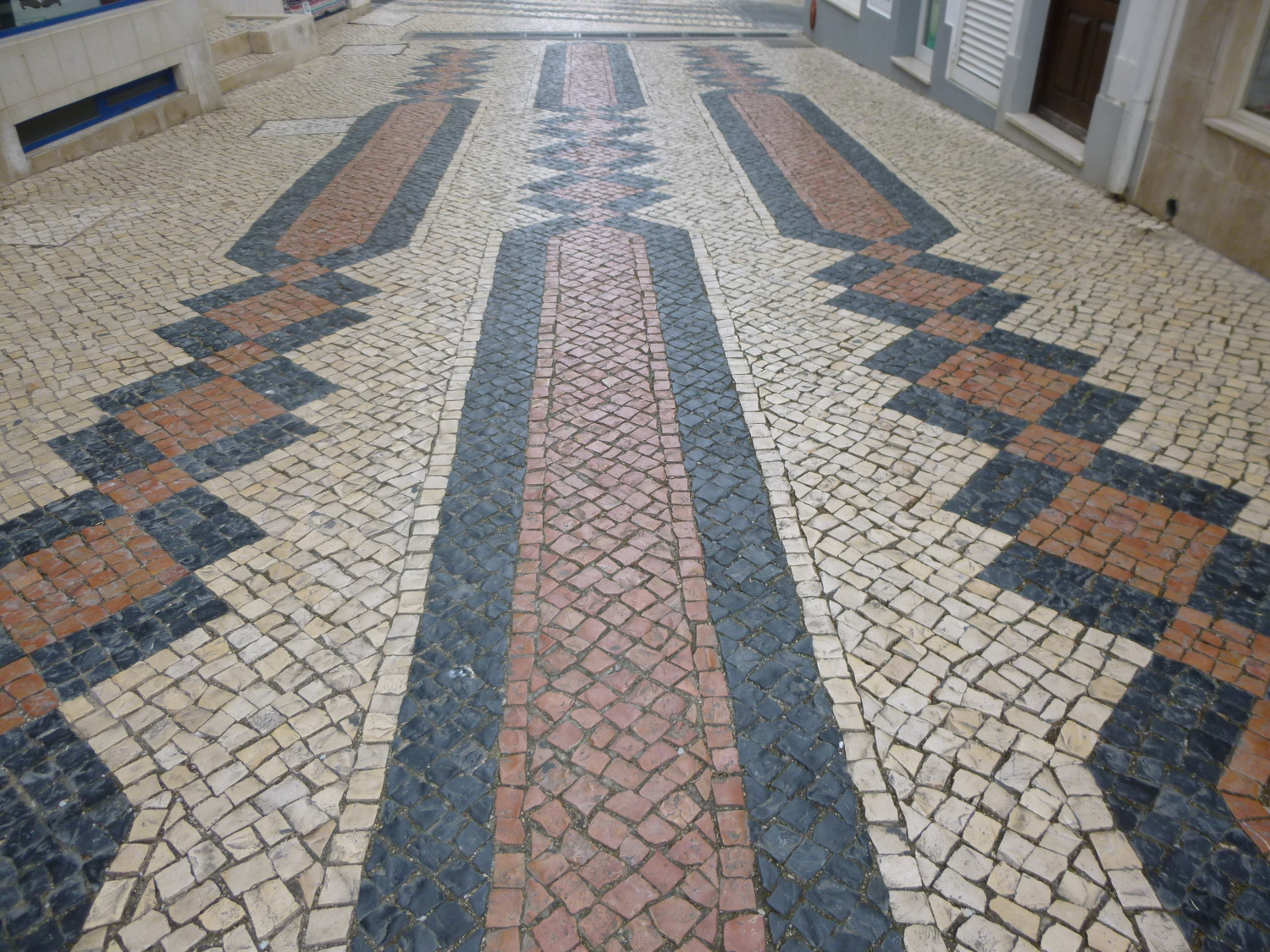
Lagos in Algarve

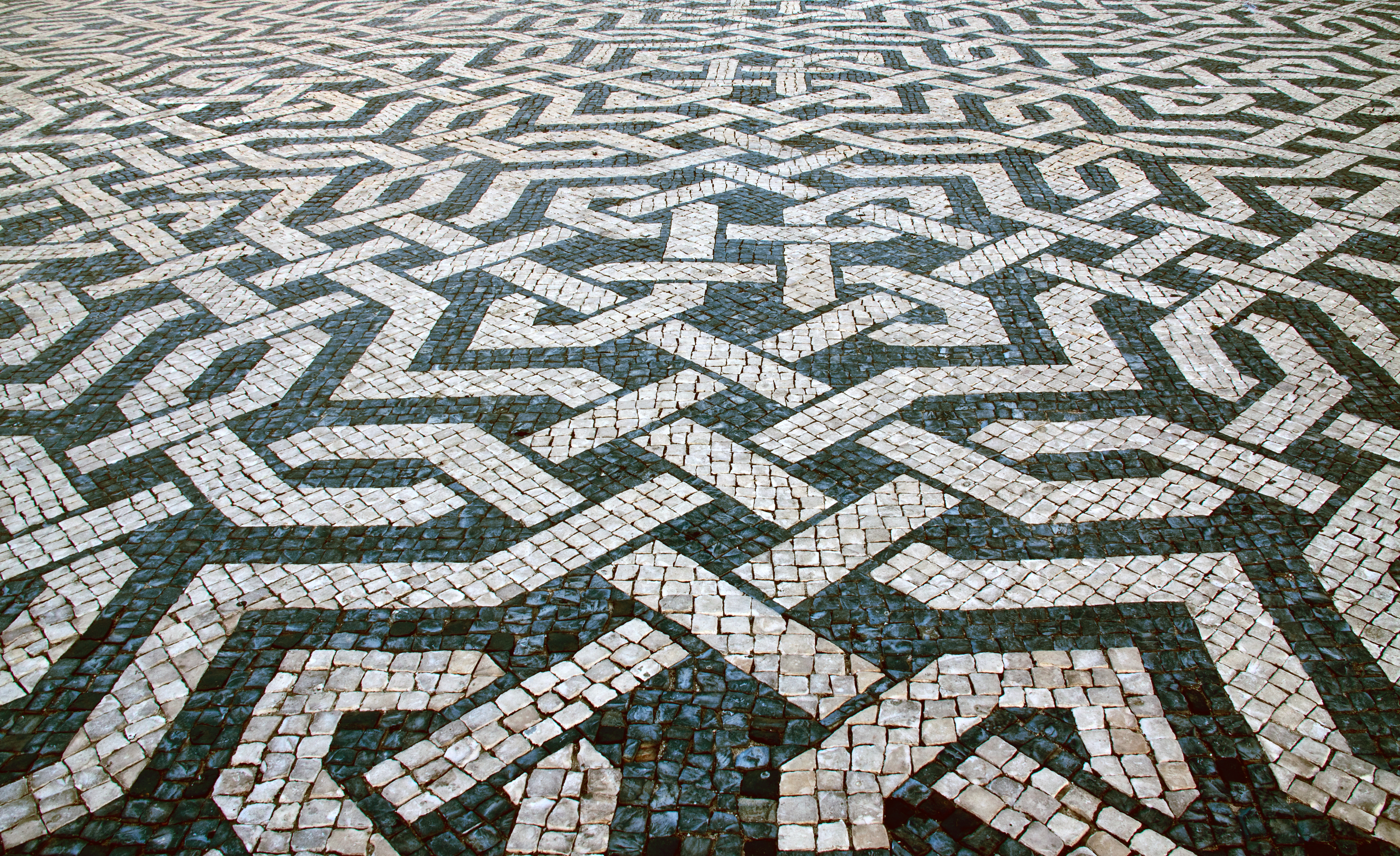
Restauradores Square, Lisbon

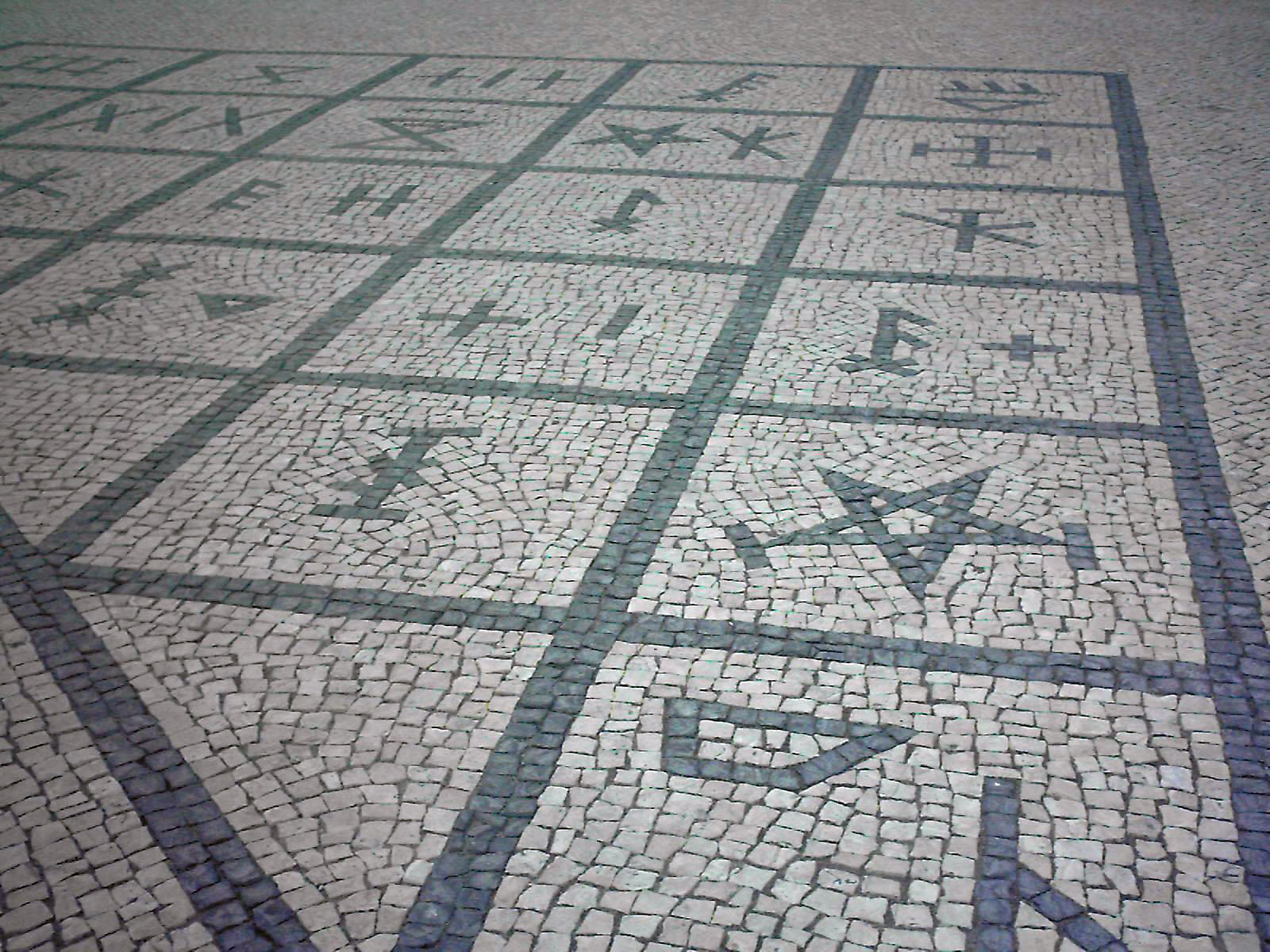
Póvoa de Varzim's runes in Praça do Almada

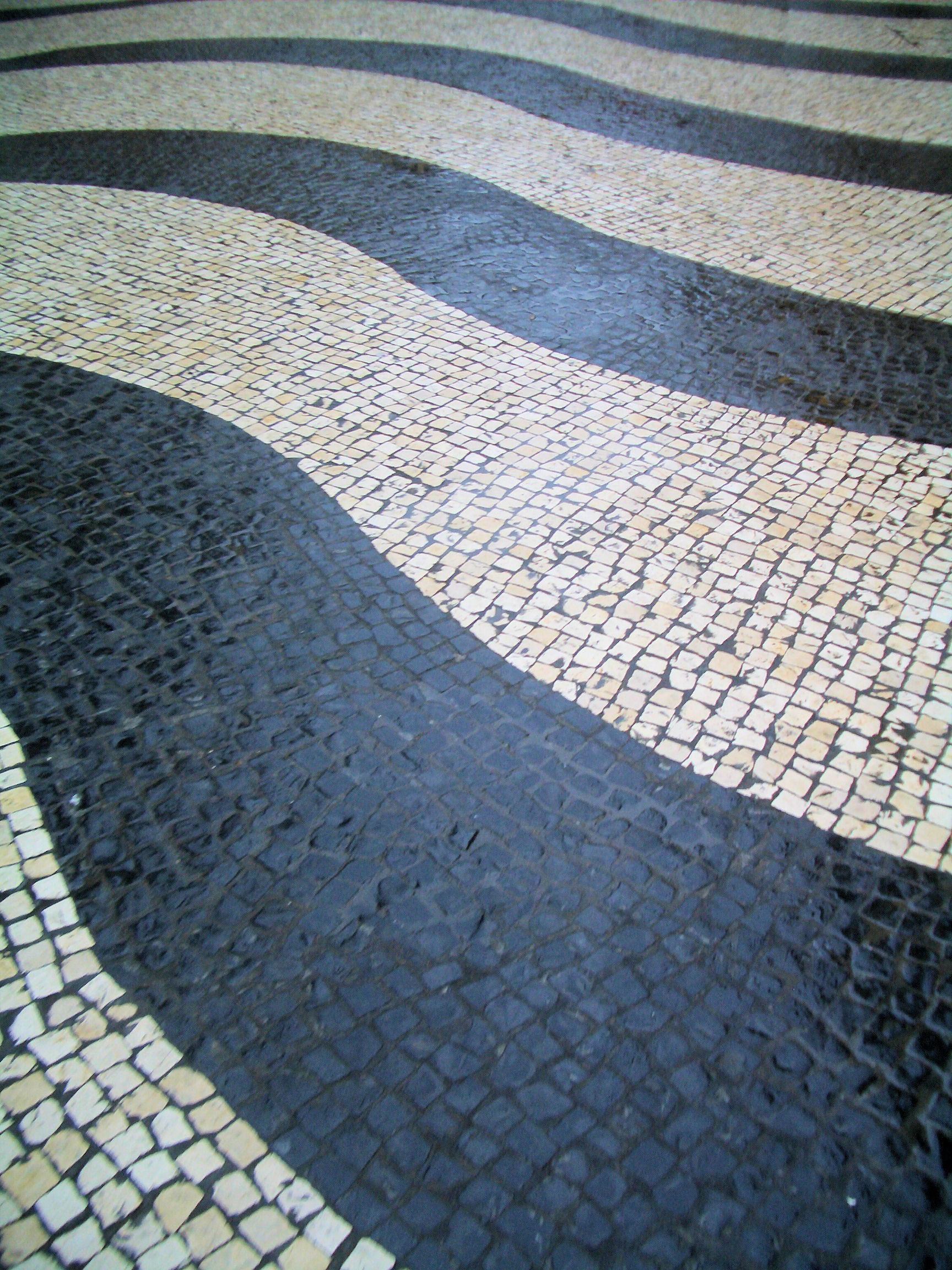
The Senado Square's distinctive tiled pattern in Macau

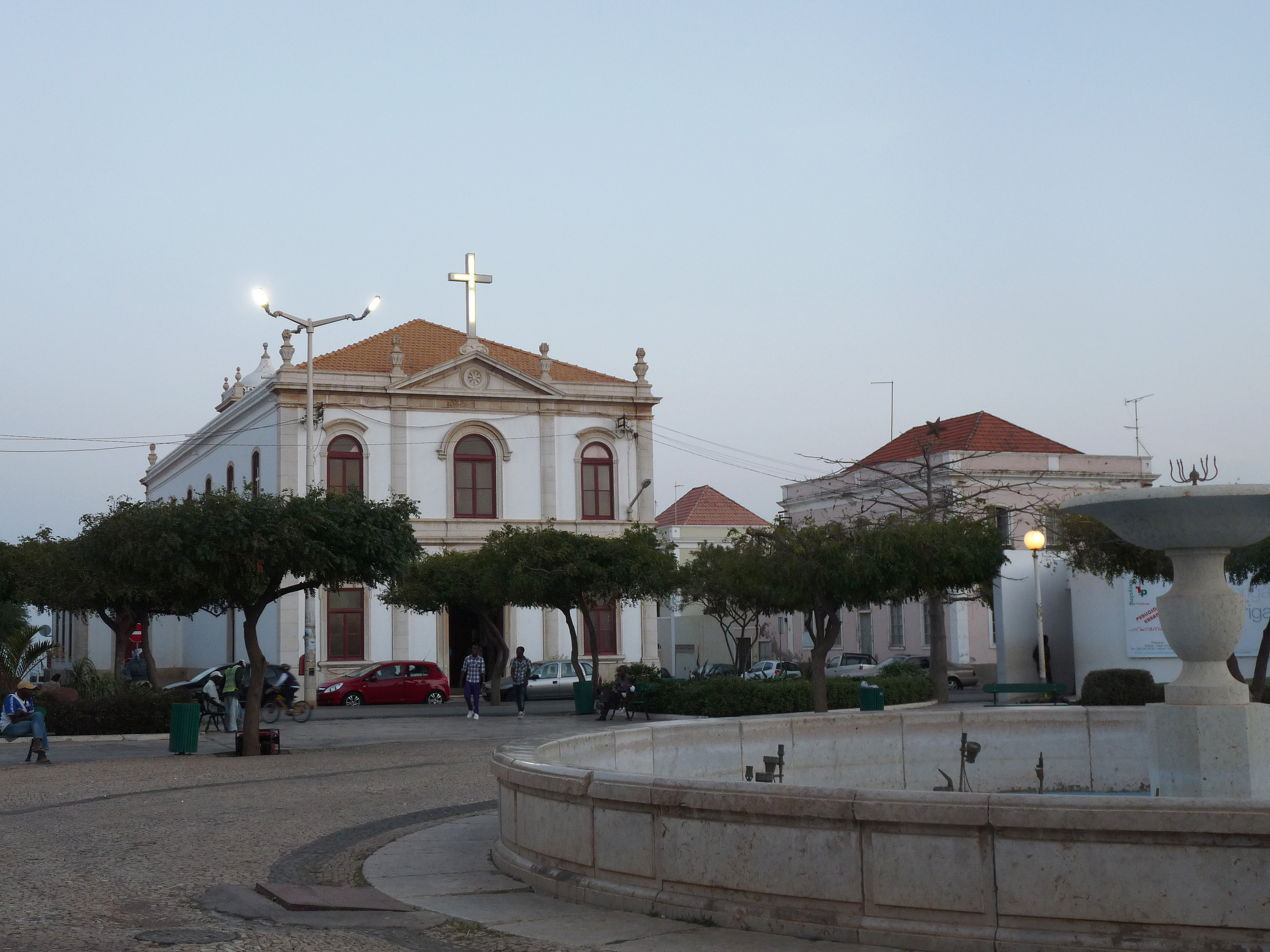
Igreja de Nossa Senhora da Graça, Praia, Cape Verde

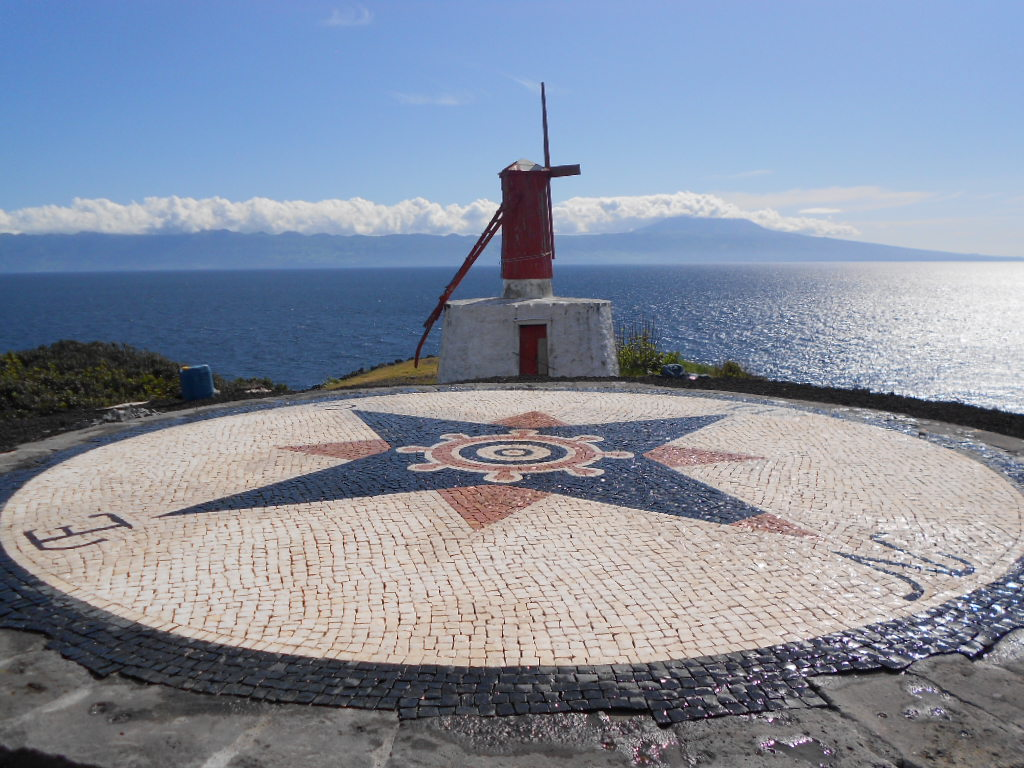
Compass rose depicted in São Jorge, Azores

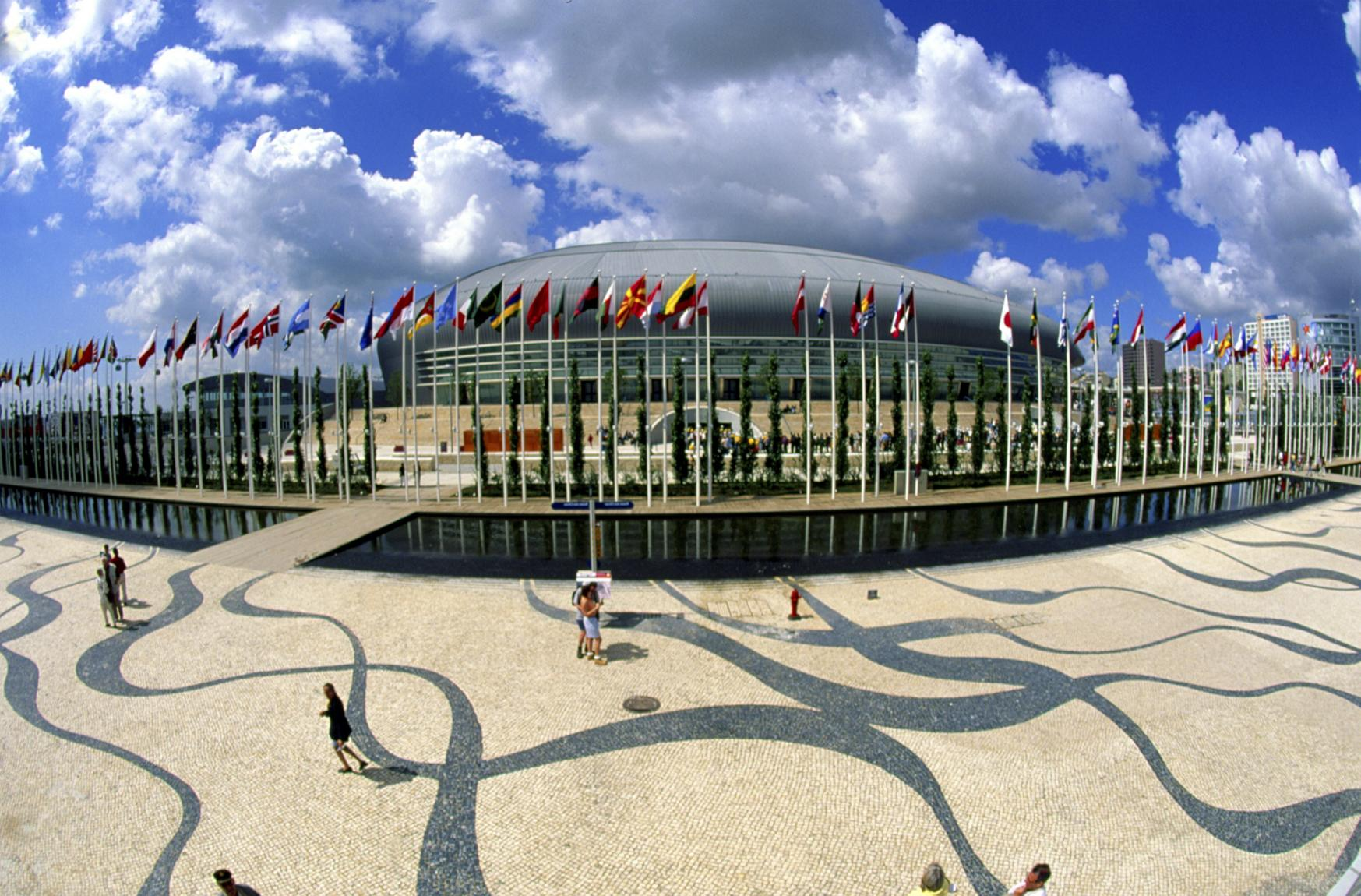
Portuguese pavement near Pavilhão Atlântico at Parque das Nações, Lisbon, Portugal

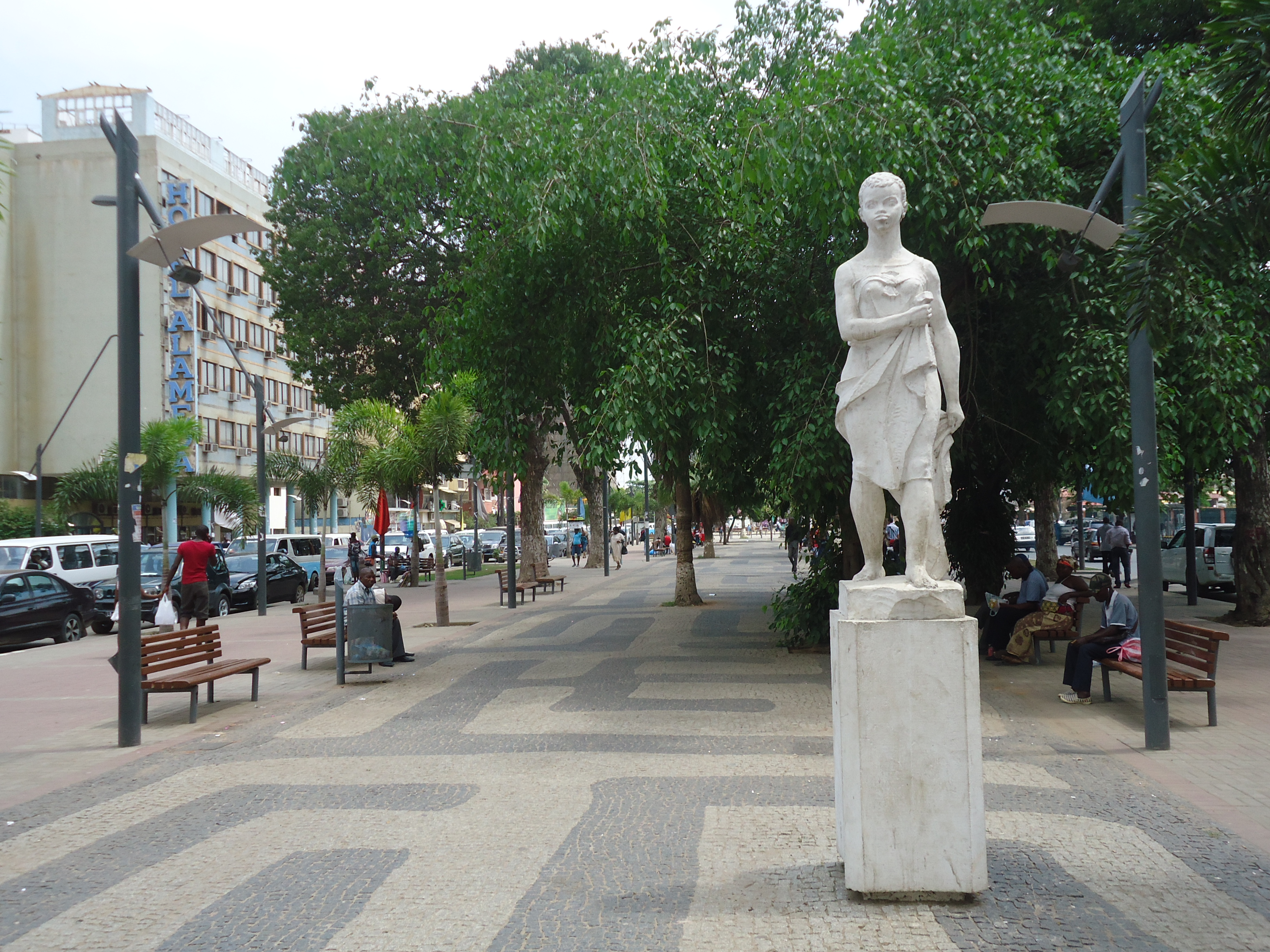
Portuguese pavement in Alameda Manuel Van Dunen, Luanda, Angola

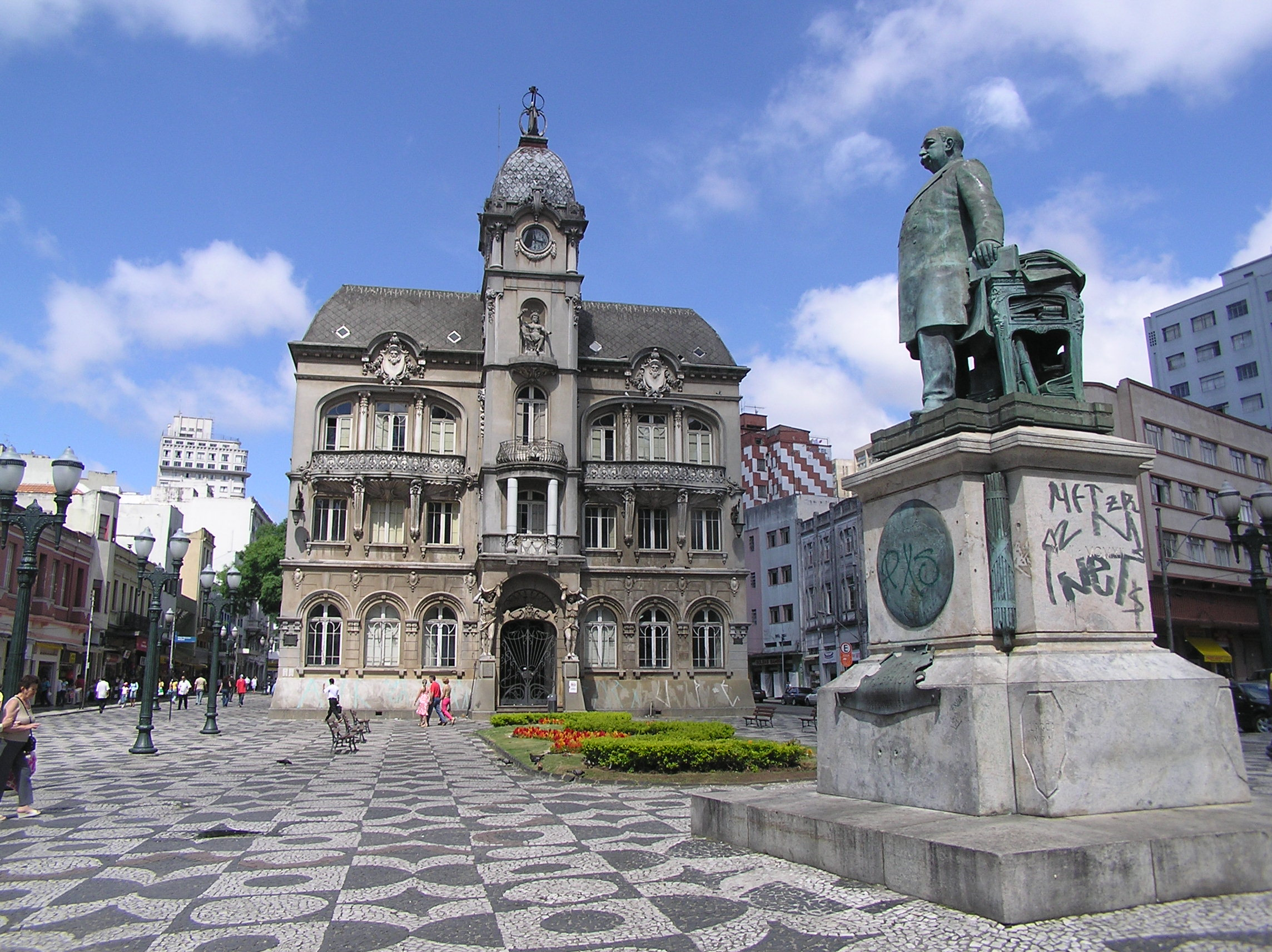
Portuguese pavement in Generoso Marques Square, Curitiba, Brazil

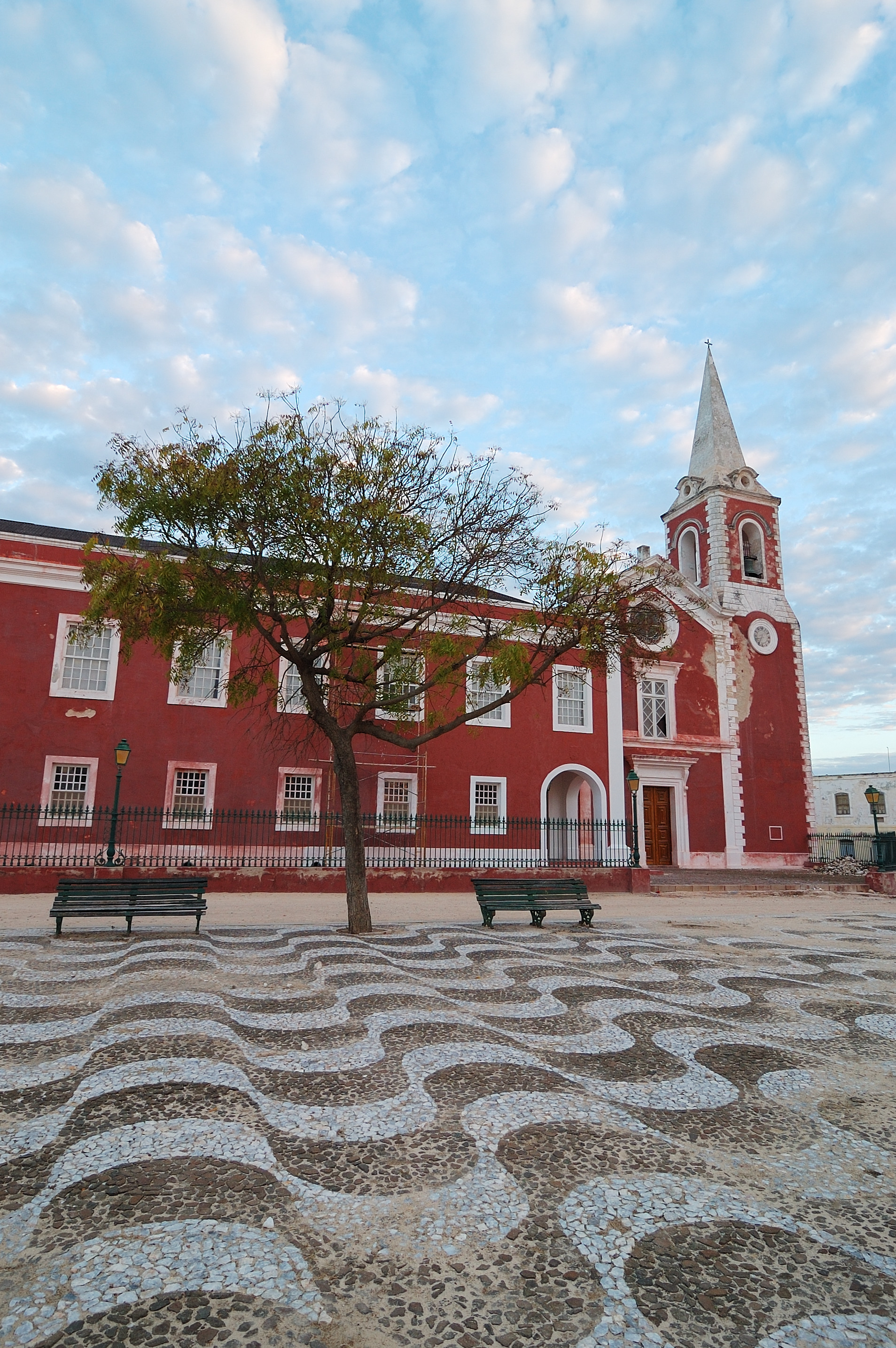
Island of Mozambique

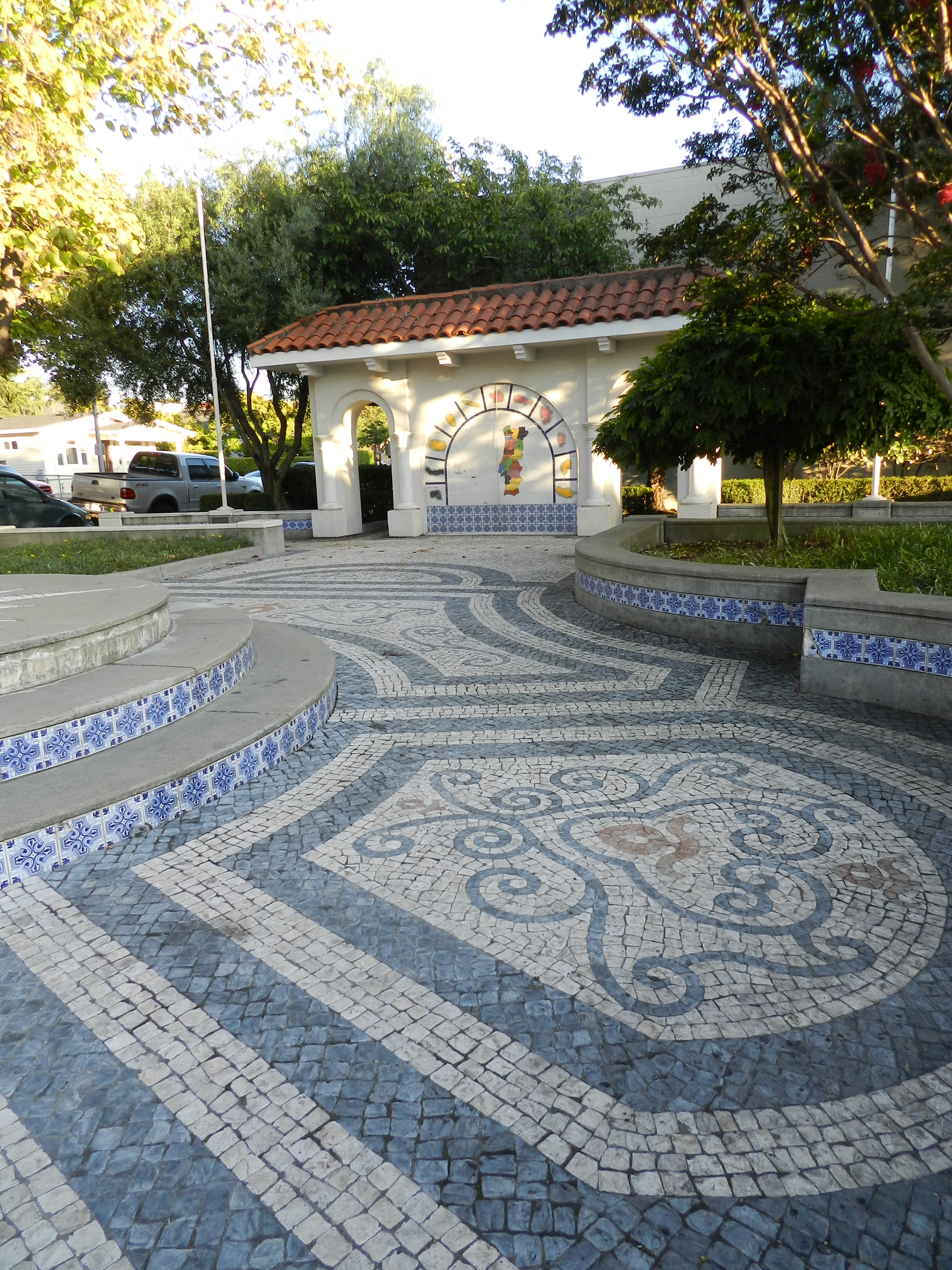
Portuguese Centennial Park, Hayward, United States

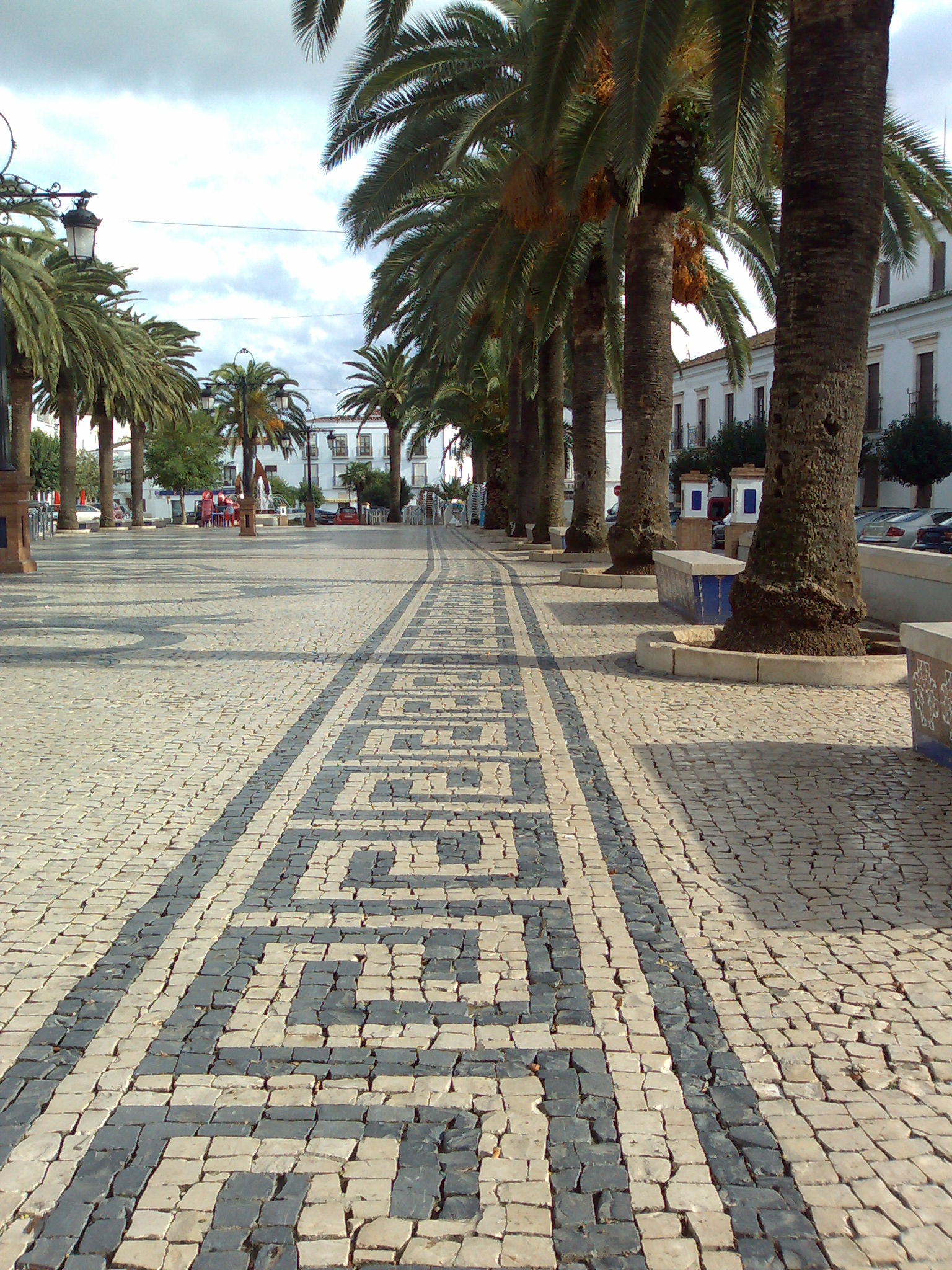
Plaza de España, Olivença

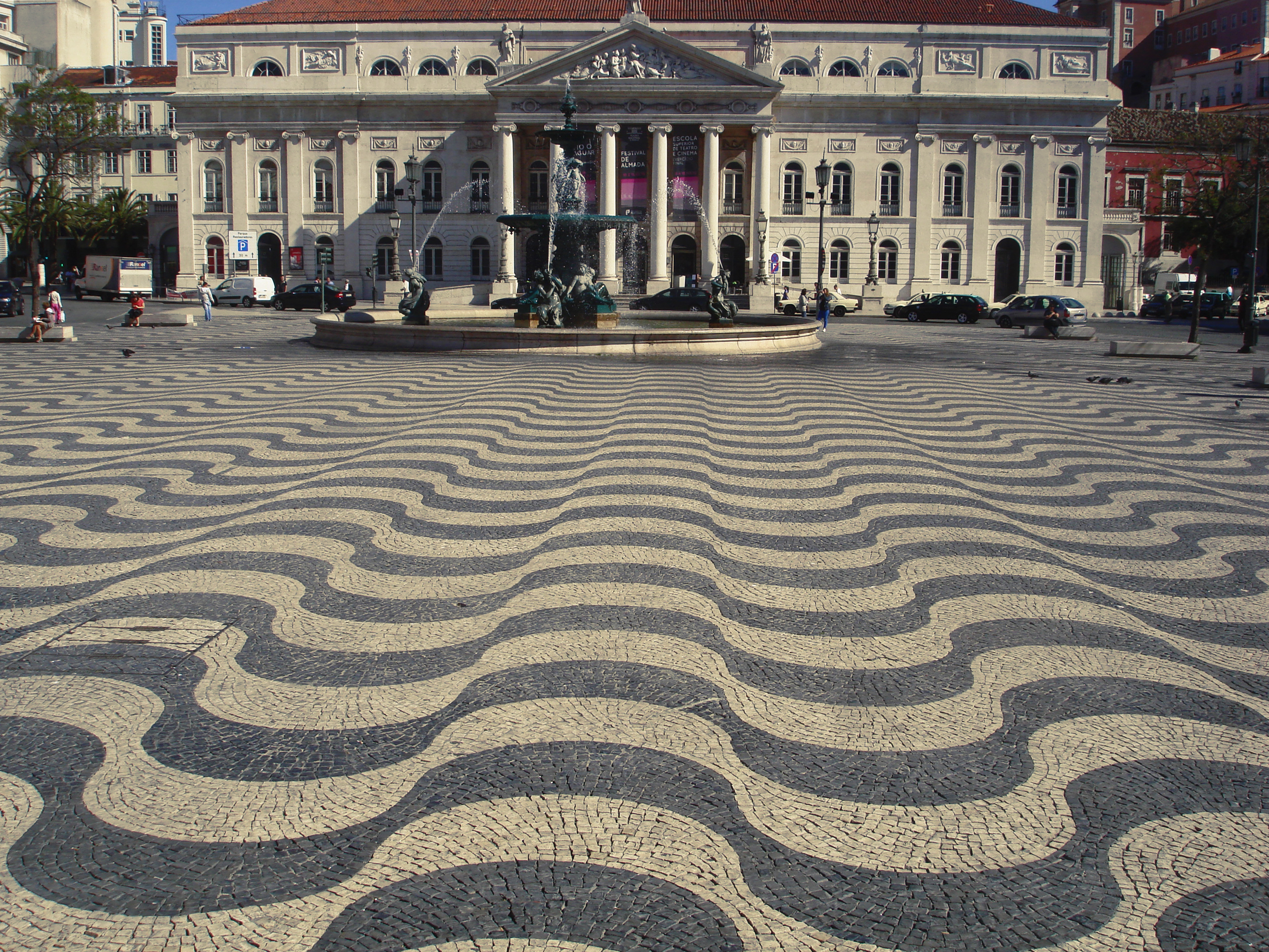
Pavement on the Rossio square, Lisbon

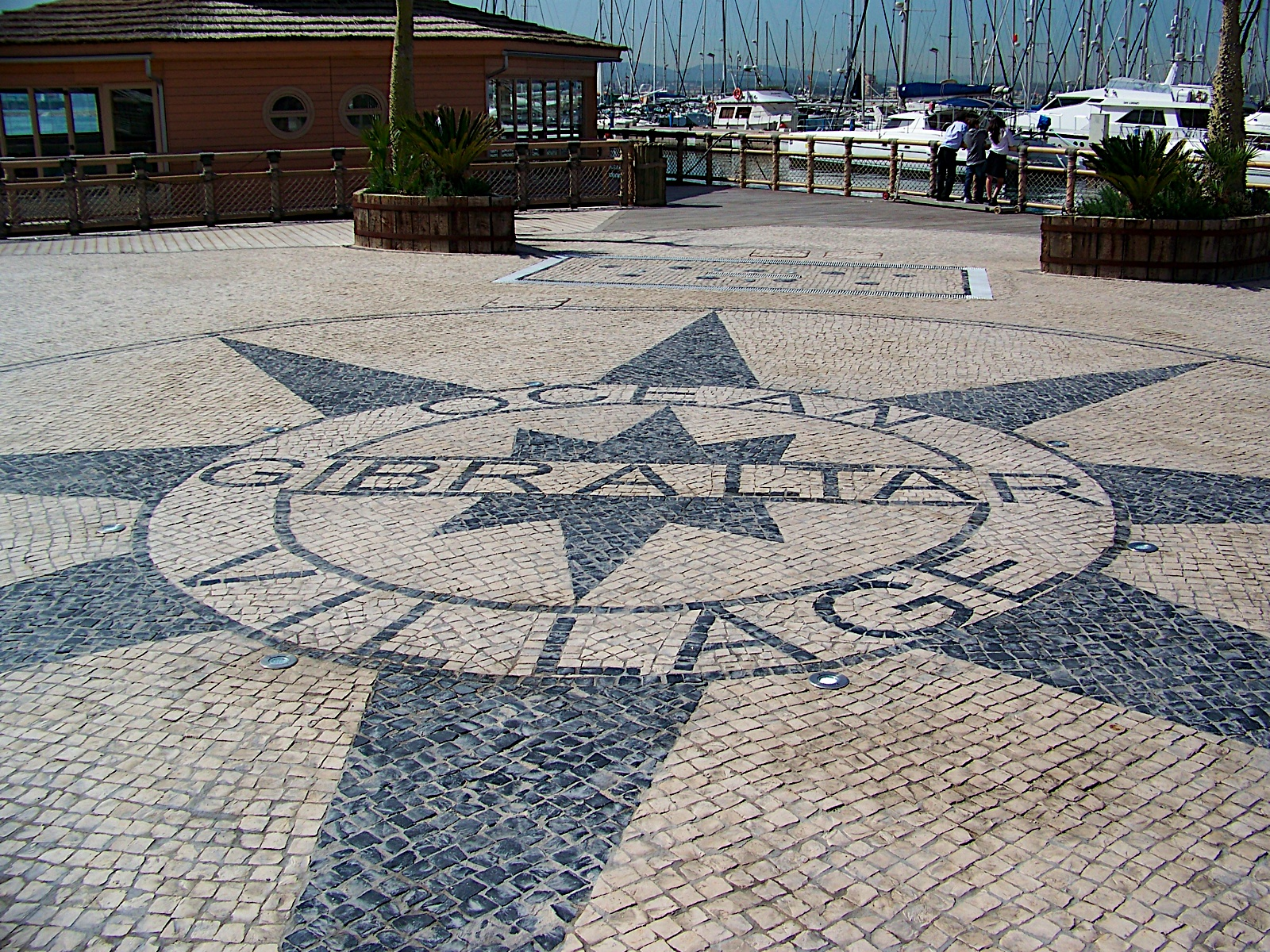
Pavement in Ocean Village, Gibraltar

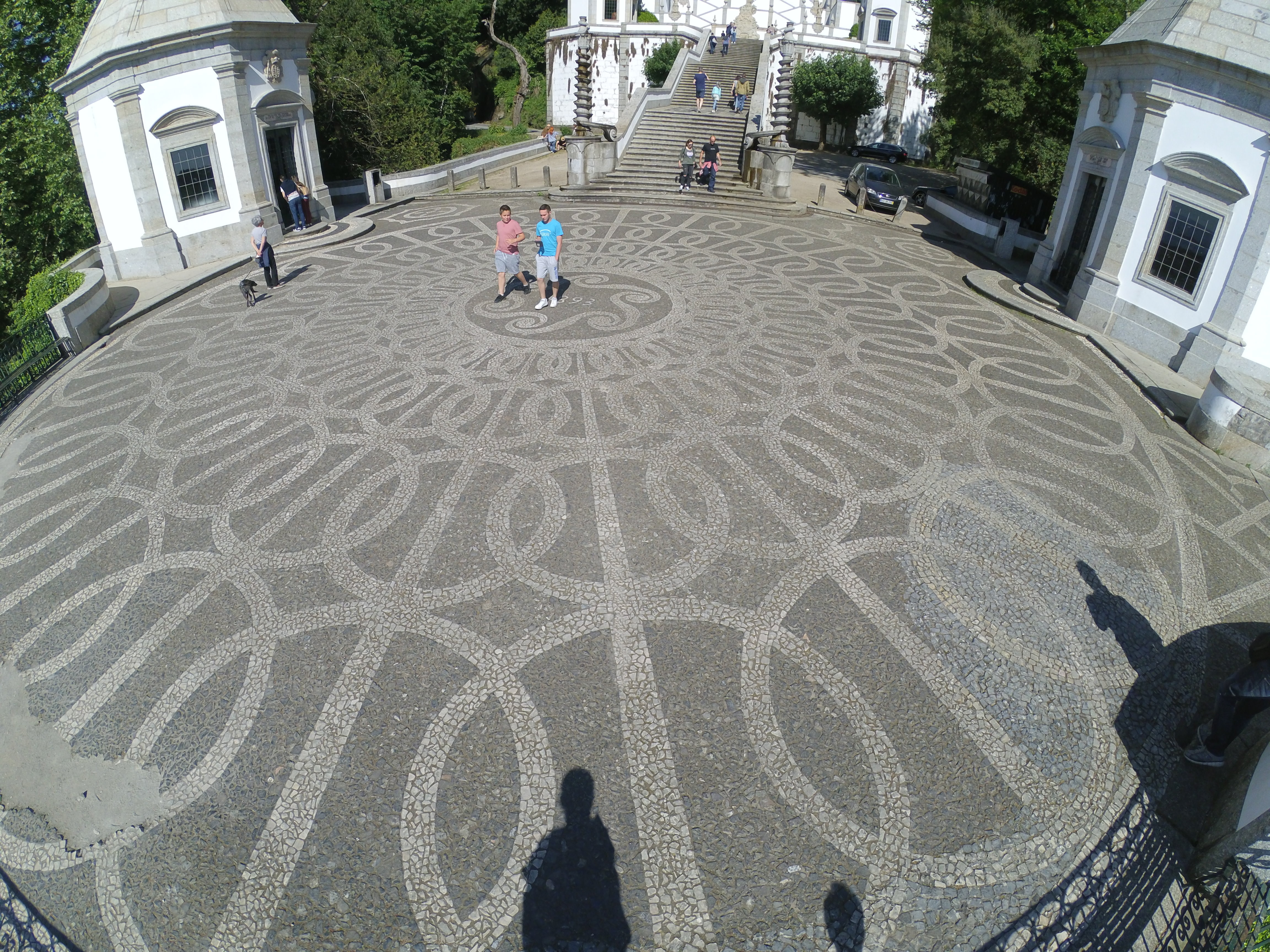
Bom Jesus, Braga, Portugal

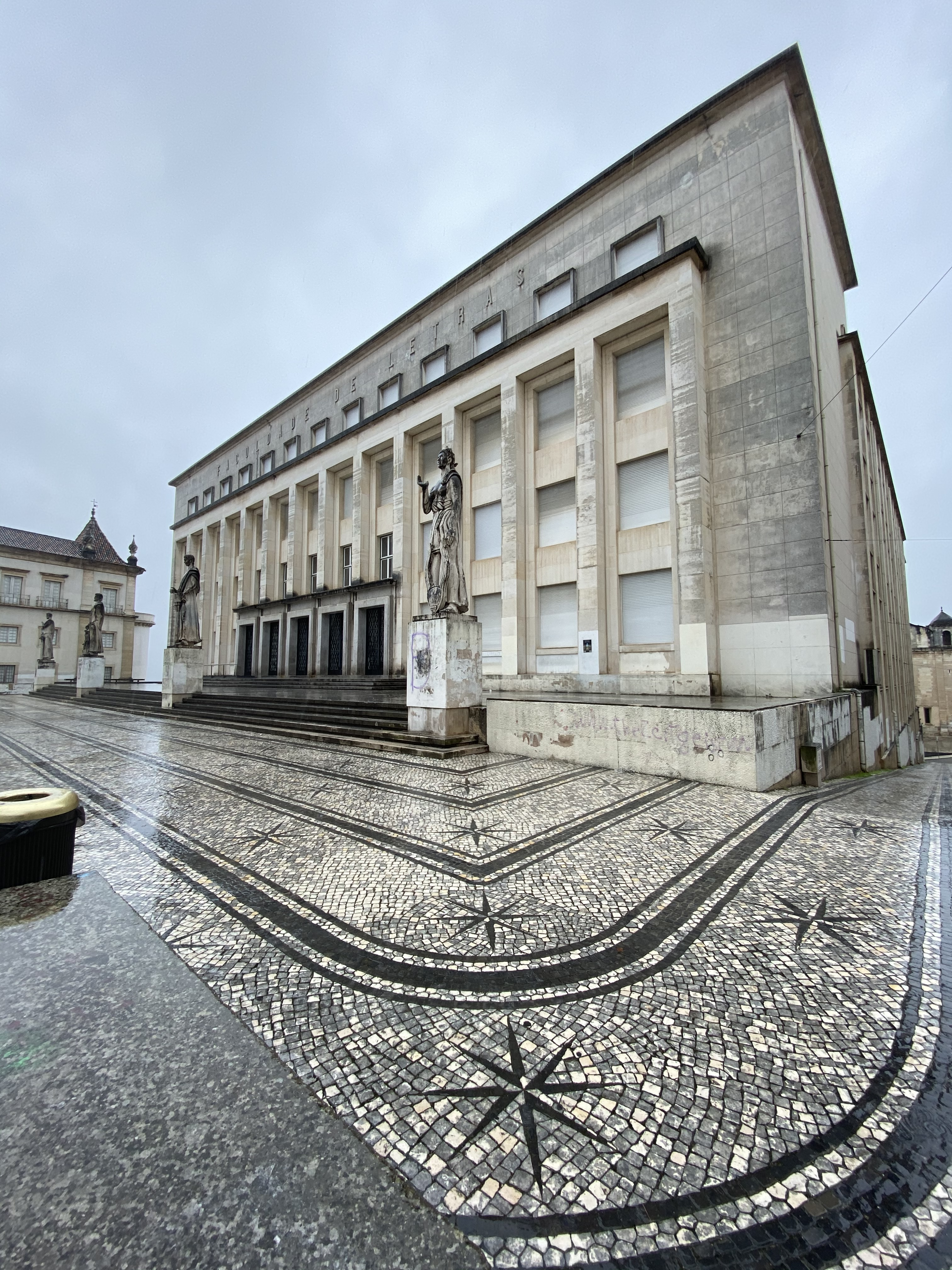
University of Coimbra

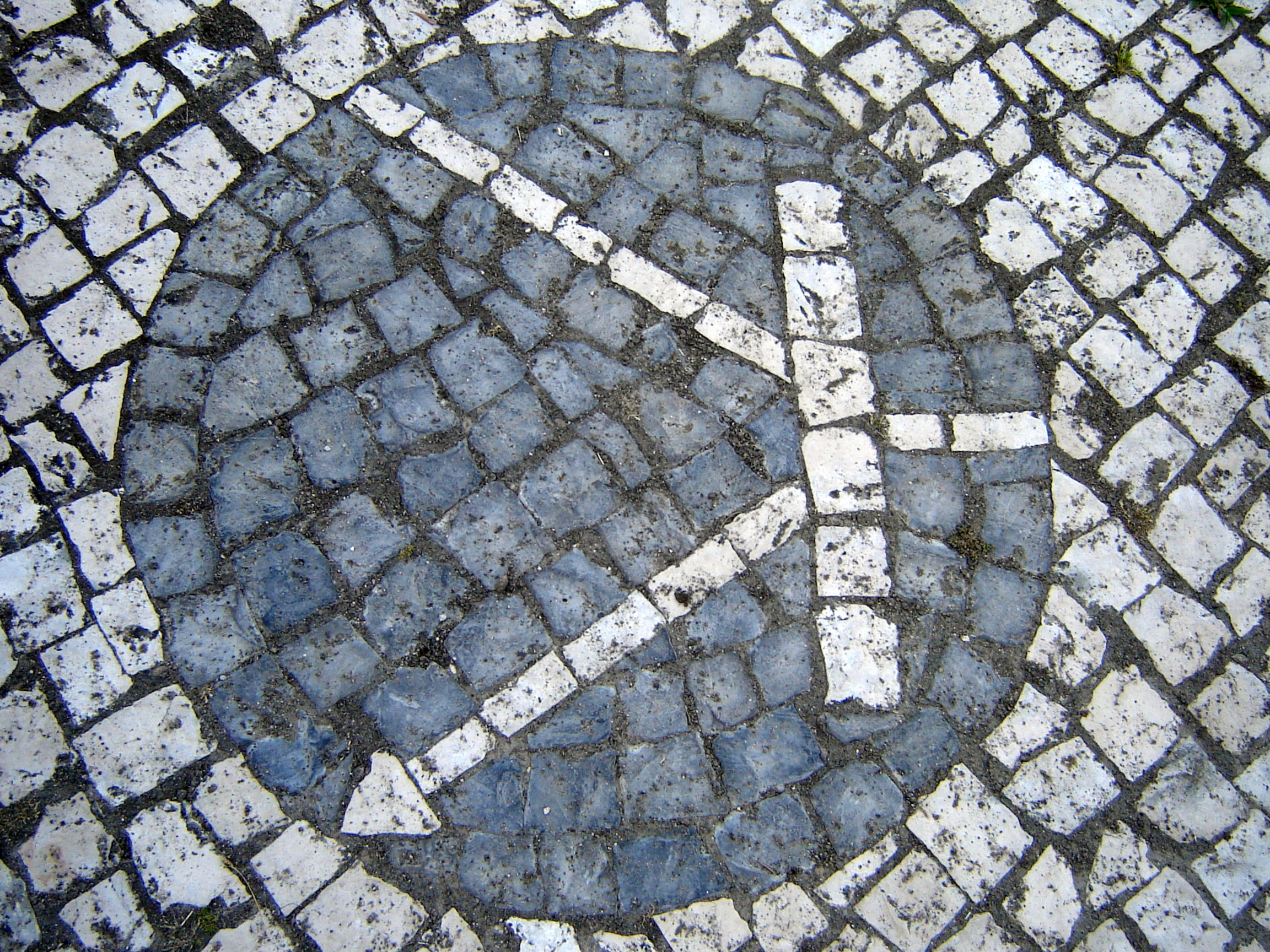
A transistor symbol at the University of Aveiro

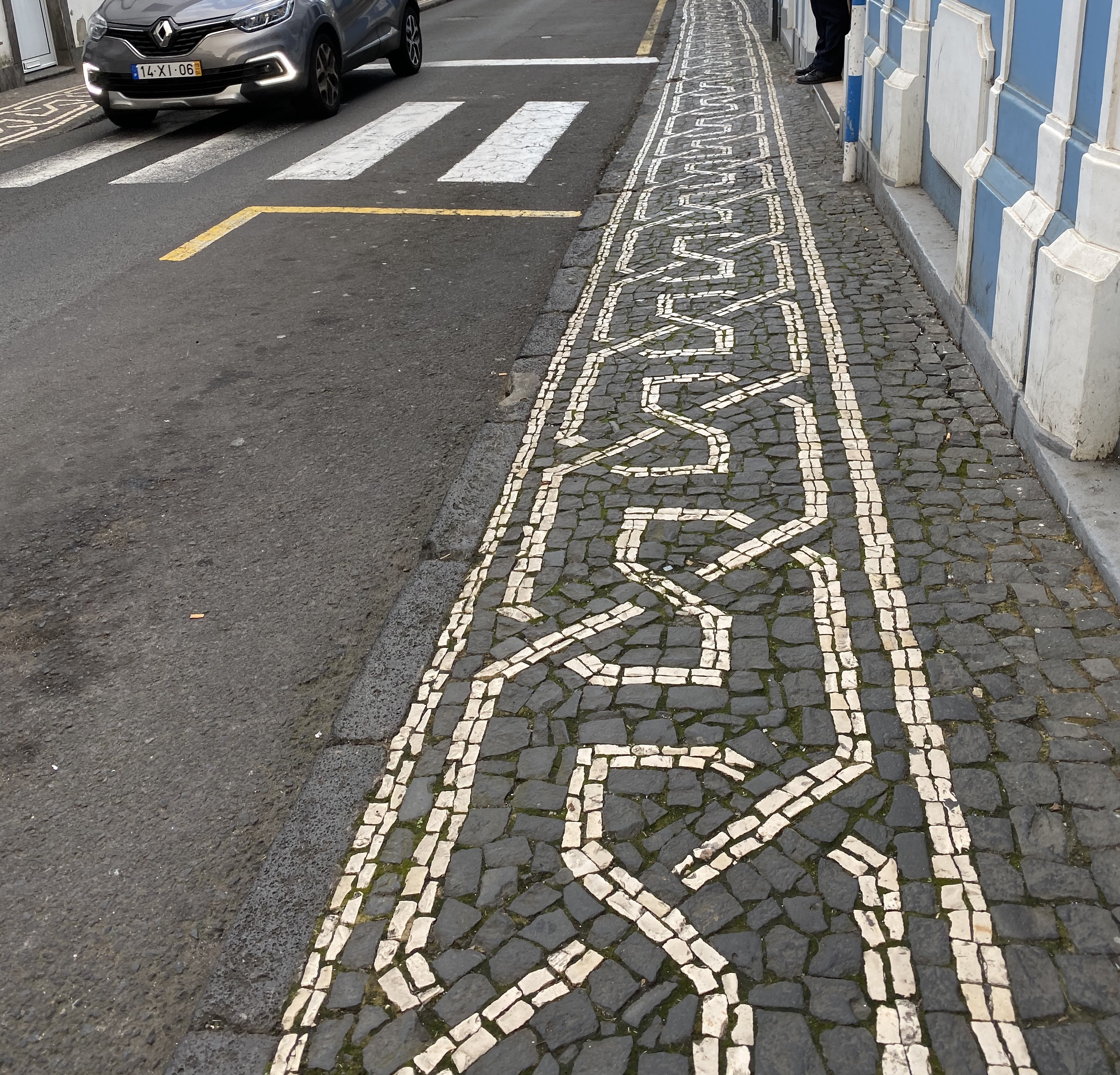
A sidewalk in Ponta Delgada, Azores Portugal

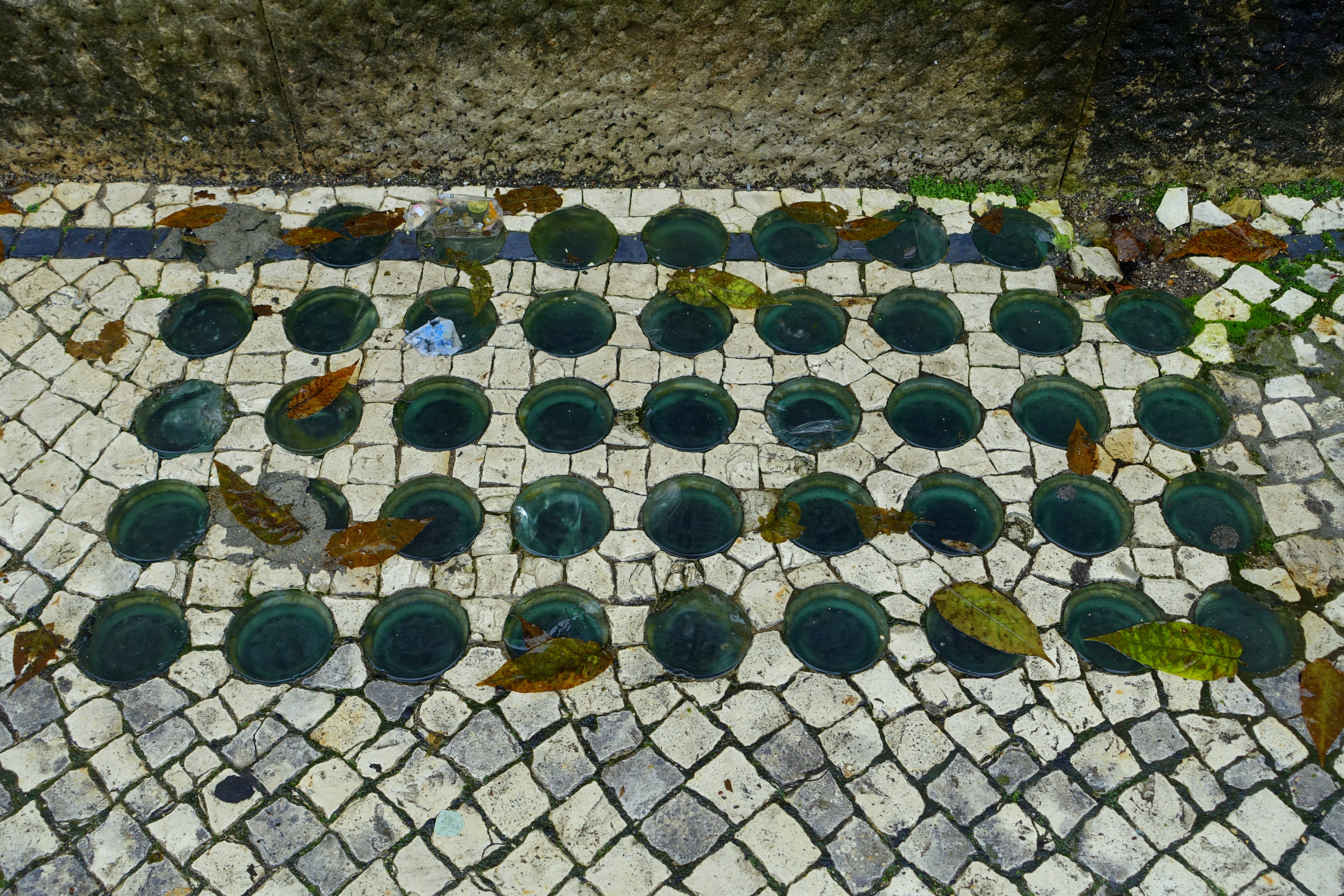
Portuguese pavement incorporating pavement lights

== See also ==
- Sett (paving)
- Mosaic
- Terrazzo
- Engineered stone
