= Monument to the Restorers =

Lisbon Portugal Restorers Monument

Coordinates: 38.7158°N 9.1417°W

- Monumento aos Restauradores (Portuguese)
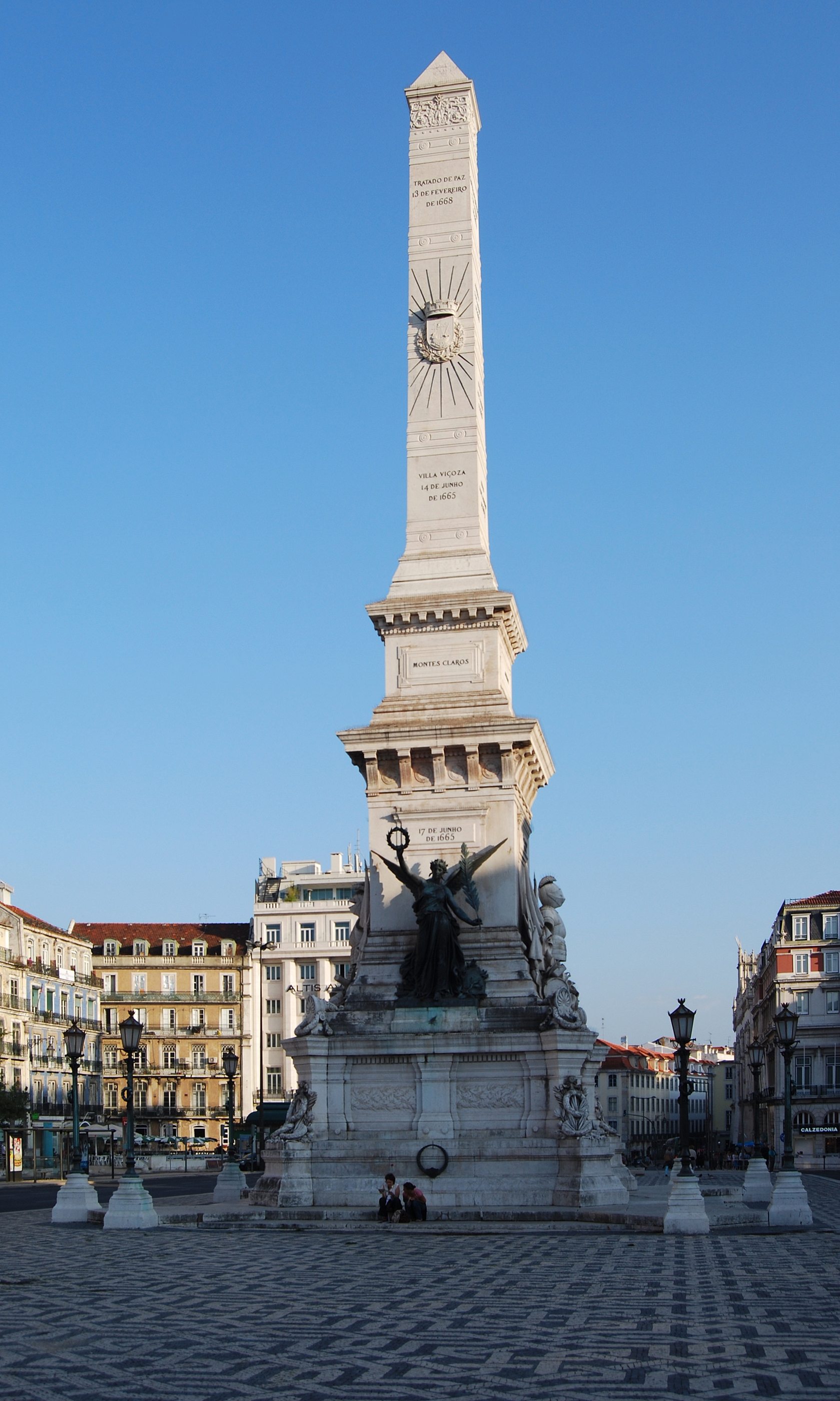
- The Monument to the Restorers
- Interactive map of Monument to the Restorers
- Location: Restauradores Square, Lisbon, Portugal

Site notes
- Sculptor: Simões de Almeida, Alberto Nunes

The Monument to the Restorers (Portuguese: Monumento aos Restauradores) is a monument located in Restauradores Square in Lisbon, Portugal. The monument memorializes the victory of the Portuguese Restoration War. The war, which saw the end of the House of Habsburg and the rise of the House of Braganza, lasted from 1640 to 1668. The monument was designed by António Tomás da Fonseca and erected in 1886.

== History ==
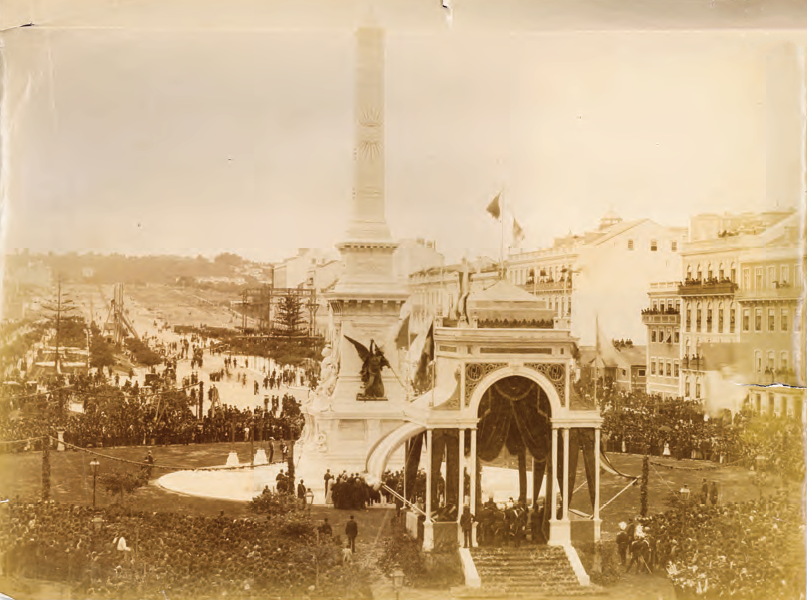
The monument is unveiled, 1886.

The Central Commission of 1 December 1640 was established in 1861 as reaction to groups defending Iberian federalism. The patriotic society was founded by Feliciano de Andrade Moura, a Lisbon merchant, and soon attracted notable figures of Portuguese society, such as Alexandre Herculano and Anselmo Braamcamp Freire. One of the main goals of the commission was to properly memorialise the anniversaries of the Portuguese Restoration of Independence from the Spanish in 1640.

After successfully lobbying the Lisbon City Council, in October 1875, it was decided that "a great landmark of stone and bronze, to attest for posterity the bold achievements of those who distinguished themselves in 1640, setting us free" would be built on south end of the Public Promenade — itself replaced by the Avenida da Liberdade, a Parisian-style boulevard, as the city expanded north in the 1880s.

The obelisk was designed by António Tomás da Fonseca, and two allegorical statues of Independence and of Victory were sculpted by Alberto Nunes and Simões de Almeida, respectively.

== Description ==
The monument stands on a square stone platform with truncated vertices, on which stand ornate iron streetlights, set on limestone plinths. The obelisk proper stands on a wide three-tiered base: the first two tiers mix concave and convex surfaces and bear, on the southern face, the inscription:

EM 1886
POR SUBSCRIPÇÃO NACIONAL ERIGIU A COMMISSÃO CENTRAL PRIMEIRO DE DEZEMBRO DE 1640
(In 1886, by national subscription, this was erected by the Central Commission of 1 December 1640)

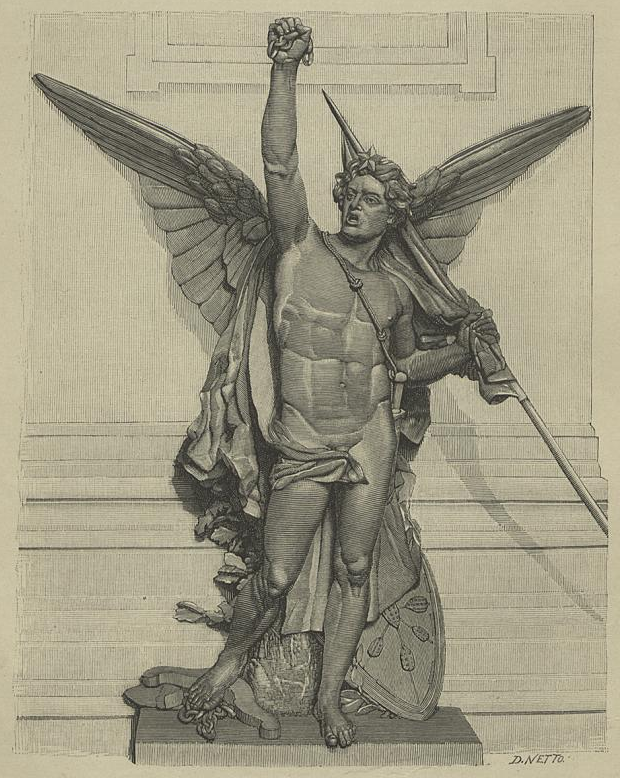
Independence, by Alberto Nunes

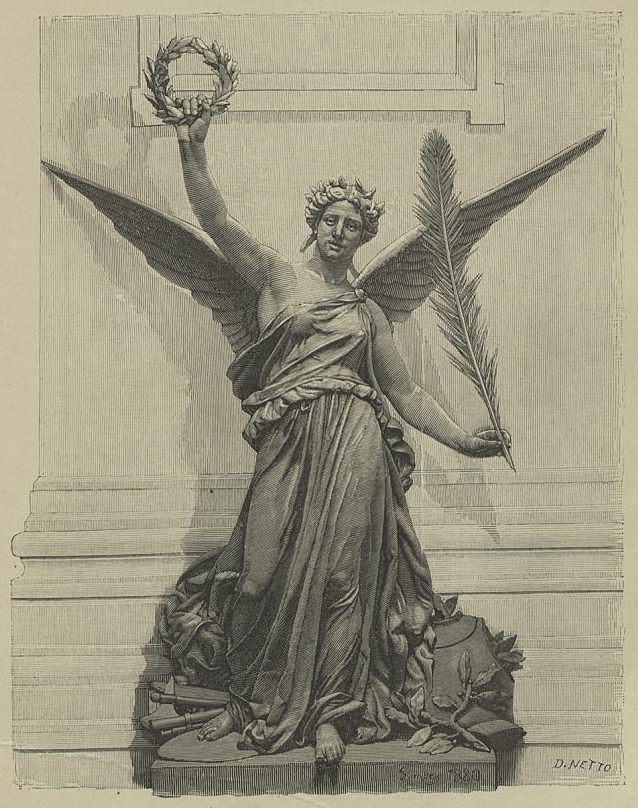
Victory, by Simões de Almeida

The third tier features several pilasters, those in the corners decorated with carved laurel wreaths, topped by a cornice and a denticulate frieze. Above the base stand two bronze allegorical figures: the one on the southern face, a winged male draped in a flag and holding the broken chains of foreign domain, is Independence; the one on the northern face, a winged classically-dressed female figure holding a palm on one hand and a laurel wreath on the other, is Victory; the eastern and western faces show stone panoplies.

Above the base, two parallelepipedal plinths are inscribed with allusions to the decisive battles of the Restoration War: 1 December 1640, the date of the Restoration of Independence, on the south face; 26 May 1644, the date of the Battle of Montijo, on the east face; 8 June 1663, the date of the Battle of Ameixial, on the west face; and 17 June 1665, the date of the Battle of Montes Claros, on the north face. The two plinths are topped by cornices supported by consoles.

The obelisk proper stands above this array of plinths: it is 14.6 meters (48 ft) in height and it bears several inscriptions on each face, separated by decorative grooves, recalling important events of the war: on the southern face, along with the national arms, the inscriptions "Angra, 16 March 1642" and "Lisbon, 15 December 1640"; on the east face, "Badajoz, 22 July 1658", "Pernambuco, 17 January 1654", "Angola, 15 August 1648", "Santo Aleixo, 12 August 1641"; on the northern face, along with the municipal arms of Lisbon, the inscriptions "Peace Treaty, 13 February 1668", "Vila Viçosa, 14 June 1665"; and on the western side, "Castelo Rodrigo, 7 July 1664", "Almeida, 2 July 1663", "Évora, 4 June 1663", and "Elvas, 14 January 1659".

== See also ==
- Restauradores Square
