= Restauradores Square =

Square in Lisbon, Portugal

- Square
- {{{other_names}}}
- Praça dos Restauradores
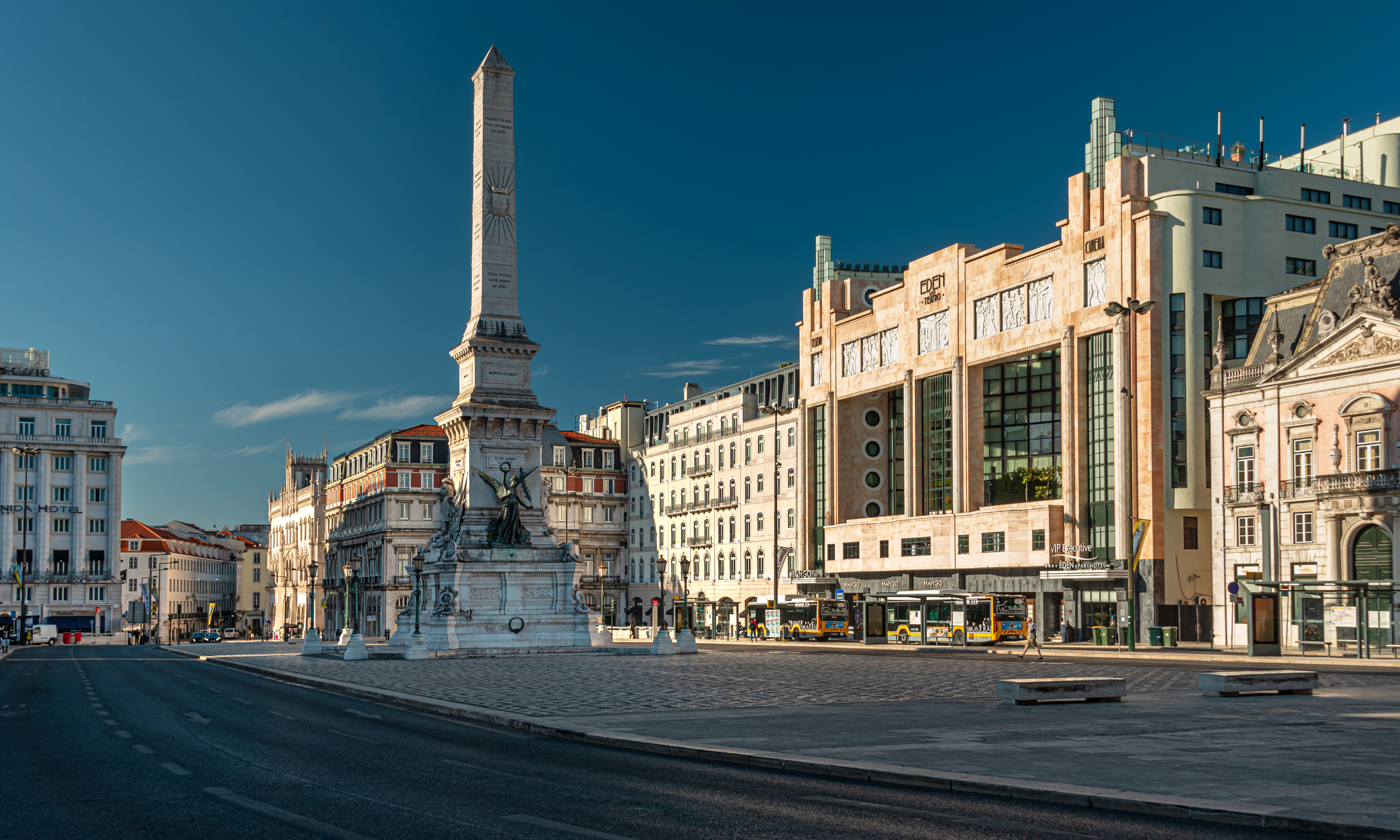
- View of Restauradores Square and the Monument to the Restorers
- Location: Lisbon, Estremadura, Portugal
- Interactive map of Restauradores Square
- Coordinates: 38°42′57″N 9°08′30″W

Restauradores Square (Portuguese: Praça dos Restauradores, lit. 'restorers square / restoration square') is a public square in the city of Lisbon, Portugal. It is located at the southeast end of Avenida da Liberdade, near Rossio square.

== Details ==
The square is dedicated to the restoration of the independence of Portugal in 1640, after 60 years of Spanish domination. The obelisk in the middle of the square, the Monument to the Restorers, carries the names and dates of the battles fought during the Portuguese Restoration War (1640-1668). The monument was erected in 1886.

The rectangular square is surrounded by 19th and early 20th century buildings. The most remarkable are the Palácio Foz (n.º 25 - 45), a palace built between the 18th and 19th centuries and boasting magnificently decorated interiors, and the old Éden Cinema (now a hotel), with a beautiful Art Deco façade dating from the 1930s, a work by architect Cassiano Branco.

Also notable is the old Condes Cinema, built in 1950 by architect Raul Tojal in Modernist style. It is the location of the Hard Rock Cafe of Lisbon.
