= Bildts farmhouse =

Architectural style

In architectural style, Bildts farmhouses are farmhouses where the main dwelling is placed at a right angle to the barn. The reason for this is unknown, yet these types of designs are common in many parts of The Netherlands.

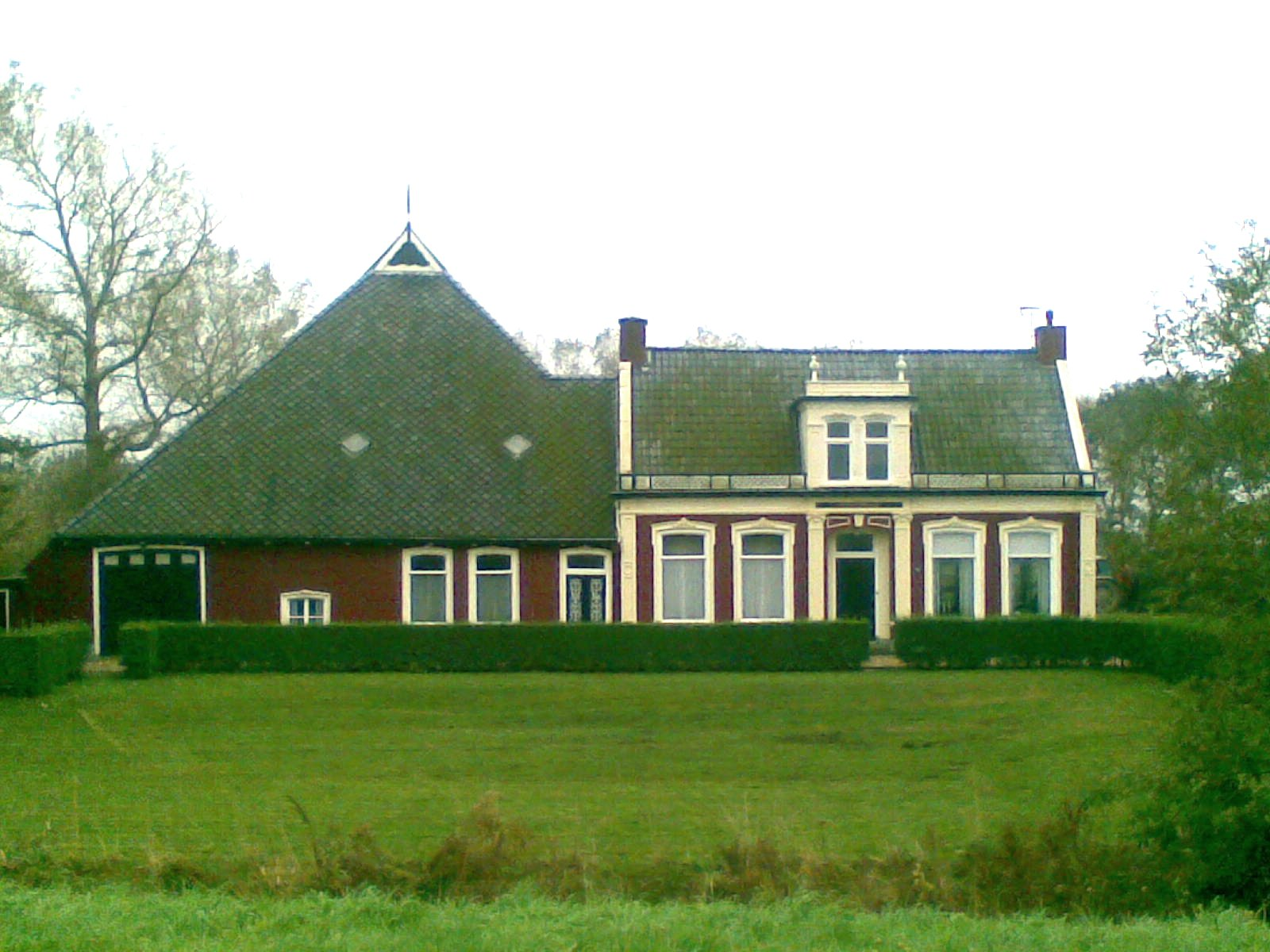
A characteristic Bildts "Kop-Hals-Romp" farmhouse along the Old Bildtdike.

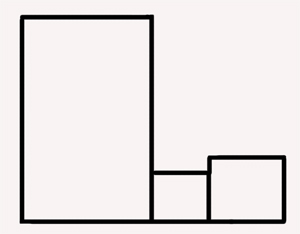
Drawing of a characteristic Bildts "Kop-Hals-Romp" farmhouse seen from above.

== Description ==
This farmhouse is commonly confused with the Frisian farmhouse, also known as the Head-Neck-Body Farmhouse, which consists of a main dwelling and a barn positioned vertically, directly behind it.

In Bildts farmhouses, however, the main dwelling has a barn either to the left or right of it, and the front of the barn is at a right angle to the main dwelling. Therefore, both the doors of the house face the same way.

== See also ==
- List of architectural styles
- Timeline of architectural styles
