= Pombaline style =

18th-century Portuguese architectural style

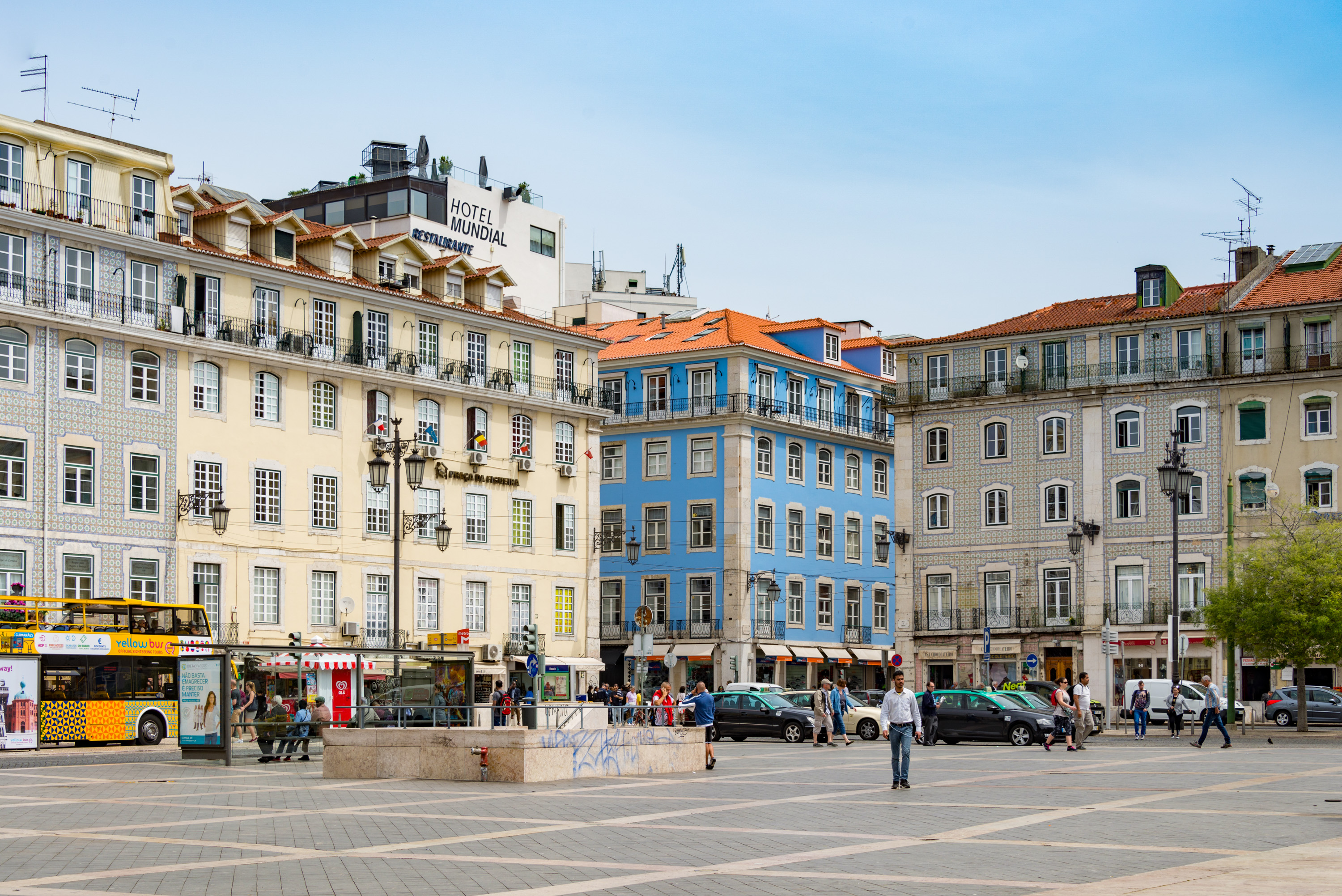
Typical buildings in Baixa Pombalina

The Pombaline style was a Portuguese architectural style of the 18th century, named after Sebastião José de Carvalho e Melo, the first Marquês de Pombal, who was instrumental in reconstructing Lisbon after the earthquake of 1755. Pombal supervised the plans drawn up by the military engineers Manuel da Maia, Eugénio dos Santos and Elias Sebastião Pope (later succeeded by Carlos Mardel). The new city (mostly the Baixa area now called Baixa Pombalina) was laid out on a grid plan with roads and pavements fixed at 40 ft wide (12 m). The previously standing Royal Palace was replaced with the Praça do Comércio which, along with square Rossio, defines the limits of the new city.

Maia and Santos also outlined the form of the facades that were to line the streets, conceived on a hierarchical scheme whereby detail and size were delineated by the importance of the street. These were in a notably restrained Neoclassical style partly the result of limited funds and the urgency of building but also thanks to the enlightenment concept of architectural rationality adhered to by Pombal. A standardized system of decoration was applied both inside and out with a distinctively reduced application of azulejo tiling.

== Pombaline buildings ==
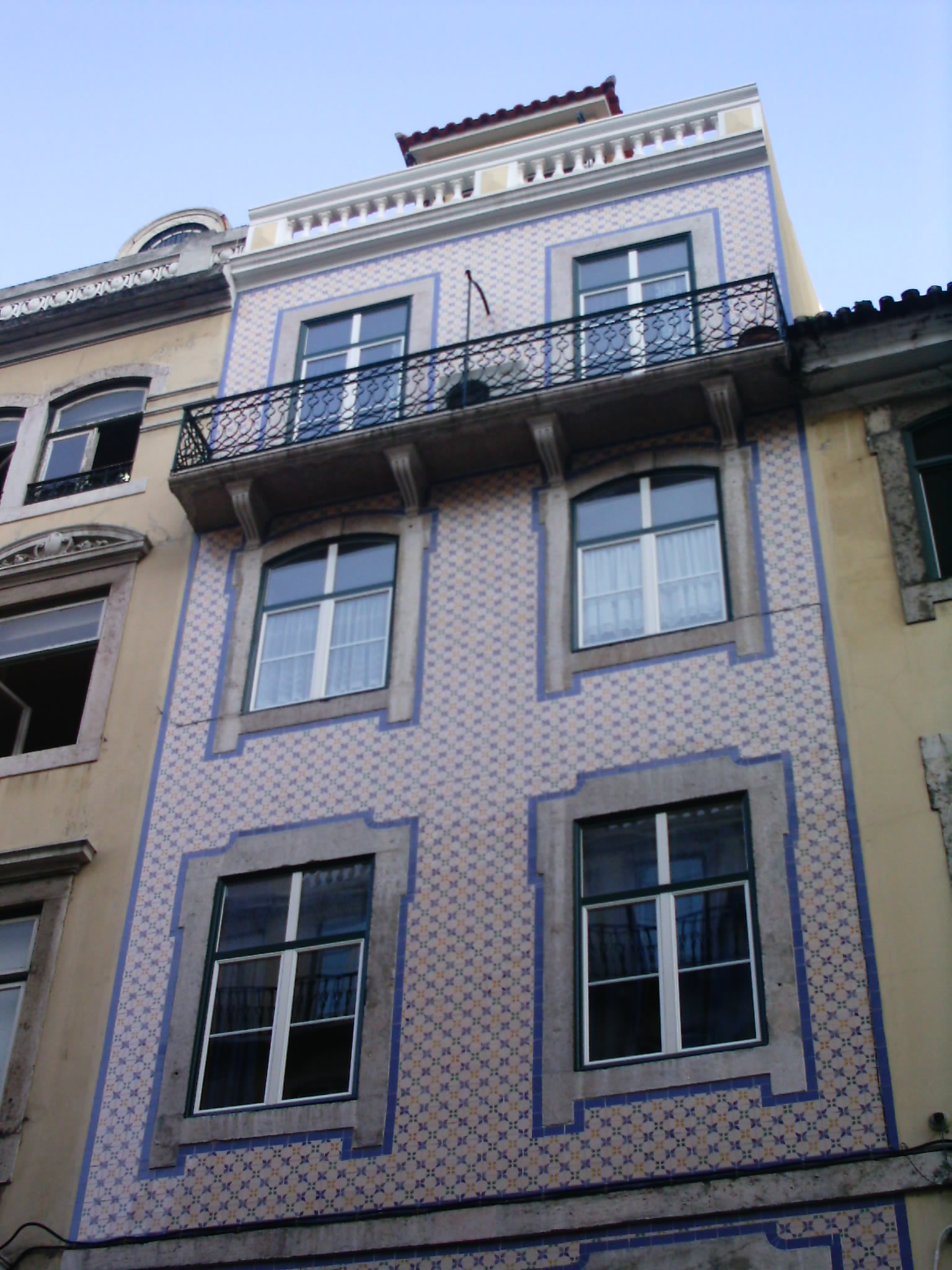
Building typical of the Pombaline style in Baixa Pombalina, but atypical in its use of azulejo.

The Pombaline style introduced early anti-seismic design features and early prefabricated building methods. A flexible wooden structure implanted on the walls, floors and roofs and later covered by pre-manufactured building materials "shakes but doesn’t fall." Lisbon’s downtown, called Baixa, the area most affected by the earthquake, is built over unstable ground, and it is thus necessary to reinforce the whole area. Another anti-seismic system was needed in this area, consisting of a forest of buried poles. Because these poles are exposed to salty water they maintain their elasticity and resist rot.

The prefabrication system was completely new. The building was entirely manufactured outside the city, transported in pieces and then assembled on site. The construction, which lasted into the nineteenth century, lodged the city's residents in safe new structures that were unheard of before the quake. Lisbon was completely changed: the medieval streets gave place to an orthogonal city, organizing the area between the city old squares, Rossio and Terreiro do Paço, with a modern design. Large spaces, gorgeous light and good ventilation, missing in the medieval city, became features of the new Lisbon.

The Terreiro do Paço, with a new name (Praça do Comércio) and without the Royal Palace, was moved west and opened to the Tagus River. New royal buildings were constructed, including twin towers inspired by the former Royal Palace tower; a statue of King Joseph I by Machado de Castro; and a triumph arc built in the nineteenth century, a symbol of triumph over the earthquake. The Rossio Square lost the old and destroyed Hospital de Todos os Santos, and remained the city "Forum", retaining its popular character despite the elegant new buildings.

The Pombaline building is a structure of up to four floors, with arcades on the ground floor to allow for shops and balconies on the first and uppermost floor. All of the buildings follow that general typology, but the small decorative details in the façade depend on the building's significance and use. Each building is isolated by walls to stop the spread of fires.

The construction of new palaces were regulated and ostentatious designs were rejected (a very unpopular situation among the aristocracy), which allowed decoration only in the portal. Windows too may be slightly more elegant than those of other buildings.

The churches follow the spirit of the time, with minimal architectural decoration outside. Single-room buildings with side altars, internal decoration following Rococo taste, simulated materials in wood and plaster, several paintings (Pedro Alexandrino de Carvalho made the best works) and a small number of sculptures was the norm. The spaces are pleasant and light. The most important churches are Santo António da Sé (where St. Anthony was born), Incarnação, São Domingos, Madalena, Mártires.

Vila Real de Santo António, in the Algarve, is an example of a village built after the Pombaline style.

== See also ==
- List of architectural styles
- Timeline of architectural styles
- Architecture of Portugal
