= List of architectural styles =

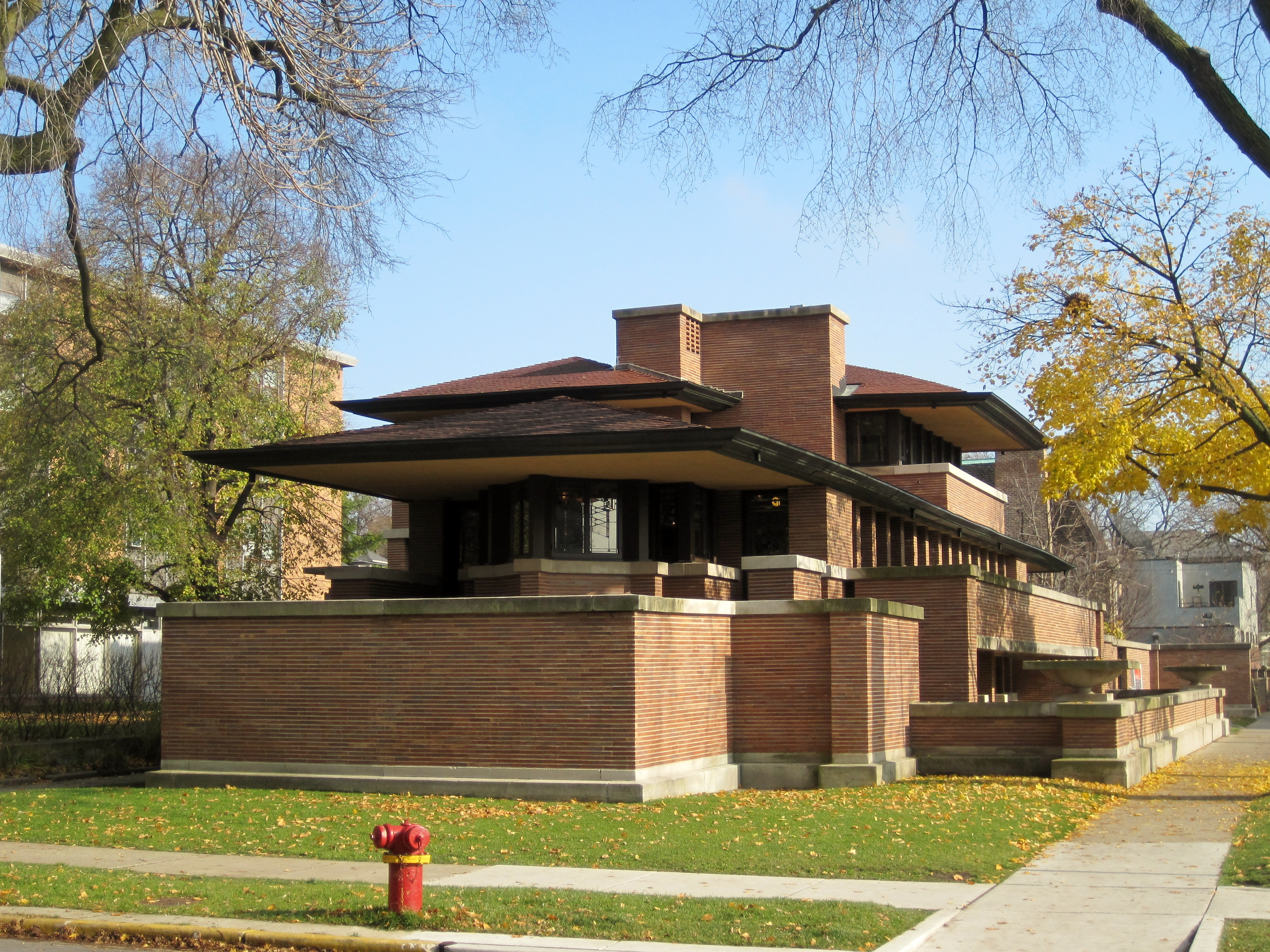
Frederick C. Robbie House, an example of Prairie School architecture

An architectural style is characterized by the features that make a building or other structure notable and historically identifiable. A style may include such elements as form, method of construction, building materials, and regional character. Most architecture can be classified as a chronology of styles which change over time, reflecting changing fashions, beliefs and religions, or the emergence of new ideas, technology, or materials.

Styles therefore emerge from the history of a society and are documented in the subject of architectural history. At any time several styles may be fashionable, and when a style changes it usually does so gradually, as architects learn and adapt to new ideas. Styles often spread to other places, so that the style at its source continues to develop in new ways while other countries follow with their own twist. A style may also spread through colonialism, either by foreign colonies learning from their home country, or by settlers moving to a new land. After a style has gone out of fashion, there are often revivals and re-interpretations. For instance, classicism has been revived many times and found new life as neoclassicism. Each time it is revived, it is different.

Vernacular architecture, unlike traditional architecture, is not designed by architects. It represents a native method of construction used by local people, usually using labor-intensive methods and local materials, and usually for small structures such as rural cottages. It varies from region to region even within one country, and takes little account of national styles or technology. As construction technology developed, vernacular styles have often become outmoded by new technology and national building standards.

== Chronology of styles ==
=== Prehistoric ===
Early civilizations developed, often independently, in scattered locations around the globe. The architecture was often a mixture of styles in timber cut from local forests and stone hewn from local rocks. Most of the timber has gone, although the earthworks remain. Impressively, massive stone structures have survived for years.

- Neolithic 10,000–3000 BC

=== Antiquity ===
==== Ancient Americas ====
- Mesoamerican
- Mezcala
- Talud-tablero
- Western Native Americans

==== Ancient African ====
- Ancient Egyptian 3000 BC–373 BC
- Ethiopian
- Nubian
- Somali

==== Mediterranean and West Asian civilizations ====
- Phoenician 3000–500 BC
- Minoan 3000?+ BC (Crete)
  - Knossos (Crete)
- Mycenaean 1600–1100 BC (Greece)

==== Ancient Arabian ====
- Nabatean 4th cent. BC - 2nd cent. AD
- Ancient Yemeni

==== Ancient Near East and Mesopotamian ====
- Sumerian 3500–2000 BC
- Elamite 2700–539 BC
- Akkadian 2334–2154 BC
  - Babylonian 1894–539 BC
  - Assyrian 1365–609 BC

==== Iranian/Persian ====
- Ancient Persian
  - Achaemenid
  - Parthian style
  - Sassanid

==== Classical Era in South Asia ====
- Karnataka
- Kerala
- Tamil Nadu
- Dravidian architecture (South Indian temple style)
- Buddhist Temple

==== Sinosphere (Ancient East Asian cultural zone) ====
- Ancient Chinese
- Japanese
- Korean
- Vietnamese

==== Ancient South Asian Architecture ====
- Harappan (7000–1900 BCE)
- Dravidian architecture
- Tamil Nadu (Early Tamil Sangam Era)

==== Classical Greco-Roman Antiquity ====
The architecture of Ancient Greece and Ancient Rome, derived from the ancient Mediterranean civilizations such as at Knossos on Crete. They developed highly refined systems for proportions and style, using mathematics and geometry.

- Ancient Greek 776–265 BC
- Roman 753 BC–663 AD
- Etruscan 700–200 BC
- Classical 600 BC–323 AD
- Herodian 37–4 BC (Judea)
- Early Christian 100–500
- Byzantine 527–1520

=== Middle Ages ===
The European Early Middle Ages are generally taken to run from the end of the Roman Empire, around 400 AD, to around 1000 AD. During this period, Christianity made a significant impact on European culture.

==== Early Medieval Europe ====
- Latin Armenian 4th–16th centuries
- Anglo-Saxon 450s–1066 (England)
- Bulgarian from 681
  - First Bulgarian Empire 681–1018
- Pre-Romanesque c. 700–1000 (Merovingian and Carolingian empires)
  - Iberian pre-Romanesque
  - Merovingian 5th–8th centuries (France, Germany, Italy and neighbouring locations)
  - Visigothic 5th–8th centuries (Spain and Portugal)
  - Asturian 711–910 (North Spain, North Portugal)
  - Carolingian 780s–9th century (mostly France, Germany)
  - Ottonian 950s–1050s (mostly Germany, also considered Early Romanesque)
- Repoblación 880s–11th century (Spain)

==== Medieval Europe ====
The dominance of the Church over everyday life was expressed in grand spiritual designs which emphasized piety and sobriety. The Romanesque style was simple and austere. The Gothic style heightened the effect with heavenly spires, pointed arches and religious carvings.

- Medieval

===== Byzantine =====
- Late Byzantine architecture before 1520 (see above)
  - Kievan Rus' architecture 988–1237
  - Tarnovo Artistic School 12th–14th century (Bulgaria)
  - Rashka School 12th–15th centuries (Serbian principalities)
  - Morava School (Serbian principalities/Bulgaria)

===== Romanesque =====
- Pre-Romanesque (see above)
- First Romanesque 1000–? (France, Italy, Spain)
  - (including "Lombard Romanesque" in Italy)
- Romanesque 1000–1300
- Norman 1074–1250 (Normandy, UK, Ireland, South Italy and Sicily)
- Norman–Arab–Byzantine 1071–1200 (Sicily, Malta, South Italy)
- Cistercian Romanesque style c. 1120–c. 1240 (Europe)

===== Timber styles =====
- Stave churches, oldest 845(d) in England, in Norway one 11th century, several 12th century, some with Romanesque elements
- Timber frame styles, mostly Gothic or later (UK, France, Germany, the Netherlands)

===== Gothic =====
1135/40–1520

- Gothic
- Cistercian Gothic 1138–15th century (various European countries)
- Angevin Gothic or Plantagenet style since 1148 (western France)
- Early English period c. 1190–c. 1250
- Gotico Angioino since 1266 (southern Italy)
- Decorated period c. 1290–c. 1350
- Perpendicular period c. 1350–c. 1550
- Rayonnant Gothic 1240–c. 1350 (France, Germany, Central Europe)
- Venetian Gothic 14th–15th centuries (Venice in Italy)
- Spanish Gothic
  - Mudéjar style c. 1200–1700 (Spain, Portugal, Latin America)
  - Aragonese Mudéjar c. 1200–1700 (Aragon in Spain)
  - Isabelline Gothic 1474–1505 (reign) (Spain)
  - Plateresque 1490–1560 (Spain & colonies, bridging Gothic and Renaissance styles)
- Brick Gothic mid 13th to 16th century (Germany, Netherlands, Flanders, Poland, northern Europe)
- Brabantine Gothic (Belgium and Netherlands) 14th century
- Flamboyant Gothic 1400–1500 (Spain, France, Portugal)
- Manueline 1495–1521 (Portugal and colonies)

==== Asian architecture during the Late Classical and Medieval Ages ====
===== Japanese =====
- Shinden-zukuri (Heian period Japan)

===== Chinese =====
- Ming architecture
- Song architecture

===== Korean =====
- Hanok

==== South Asia and Indosphere Southeast Asia ====
- Bengalese
- Karnataka
- Kerala
- Tamil Nadu
- Pakistani
- Khmer
- Indonesian
- Myanmar architecture

===== Late Dravidian temple styles =====
- Badami Chalukya or "Deccan architecture" (450–700CE)
- Rashtrakuta 750–983 (Central and South India)
- Western Chalukya or Gadag (1050-1200CE)
- Hoysala (900–1300CE)
- Vijayanagara 1336–1565 (South India)

===== South Asian and Southeast Asian Architecture styles =====
- Mauryan (321–185 BC)
- Kalinga Architecture
  - Rekha Deula
  - Pidha Deula
  - Khakhara Deula
- Hemadpanthi (1200–1270 CE) (Maharashtra)
- Sikh architecture
- Bengal temple architecture: 1400 to present
  - Nagara style
  - Māru-Gurjara architecture 900 to present (Rajasthan and Gujarat)
  - Vesara style (Dravidian fusion styles)
  - Badami Chalukya architecture

==== Islamic architecture 620–1918 ====
- Central styles (multi-regional)
  - Prophetic era – based in Medina (c. 620–630)
  - Rashidun period – based in Medina (c. 630–660)
  - Umayyad architecture – based in Damascus (c. 660–750)
  - Abbasid architecture – based in Baghdad (c. 750–1256)
  - Fatimid architecture (909–1171)
  - Mamluk architecture – based in Cairo (c. 1256–1517)
  - Ottoman architecture – based in Istanbul (c. 1517–1918)
- Regional styles
  - Egypt, including empires ruled from Egypt
    - Early Islamic architecture (Rashidun + Umayyad) (641–750)
    - Abbasid architecture (750–954)
    - Fatimid architecture (954–1170)
    - Ayyubid architecture (1174–1250); category see here
    - Mamluk architecture (1254–1517)
    - Ottoman architecture (1517–1820)
  - North Africa (the Maghrib)
    - Umayyad architecture (705–750)
    - Abbasid architecture (750–909)
    - Fatimid architecture (909–1048)
    - Moorish architecture (788–1550)
      - Idrisid architecture (788–974, Far Maghreb)
      - Aghlabid architecture (800–909, Eastern Maghreb)
      - Zirid architecture (1048–1148, Middle Maghreb)
      - Almoravid architecture (1040–1147, Far Maghreb)
      - Almohad architecture (1121–1269, Far Maghreb)
      - Hafsids 1229–1574 (Near and Middle Maghreb)
      - Marinids (1244–1465, Middle and Far Maghreb)
      - Zayyanids (1235–1550, Middle Maghreb)
    - Ottoman architecture (1550–1830, Near and Middle Maghreb)
    - Local styles under local dynasties (1549–present, Far Maghreb)
  - Islamic Spain
    - Umayyad architecture (756–1031)
    - Taifa Kingdoms-1 (1031–1090)
    - Almoravid architecture (1090–1147)
    - Taifa Kingdoms-2 (1140–1203)
    - Almohad architecture (1147–1238),
    - Taifa Kingdoms-3 (1232–1492)
      - Granada architecture (1287–1492)
  - Persia and Central Asia
    - Khurasani architecture (Late 7th–10th century)
    - Razi style (10th–13th century)
      - Samanid architecture (10th c.)
      - Ghaznawid architecture (11th c.)
      - Seljuk architecture (11th–12th c.)
      - Mongol-period architecture (13th c.)
    - Timurid style (14th–16th c.)
    - Isfahani style (17th–19th c.)
  - Islamic-influenced architecture in South Asia
    - Indo-Islamic architecture (1204–1857)
      - Mughal architecture (1526–1707)
  - Turkey
    - Anatolian Seljuk architecture (1071–1299)
    - Ottoman architecture (1299–1922)
    - First national architectural movement (1908–1940)

==== Pre-Columbian Indigenous American styles ====
- Aztec (ca. 14th century – 1521)
- Maya
- Pueblo
- Puuc

==== African architecture ====
- Hausa
- Yoruba

=== Early modern period and European Colonialism ===
From 1425 to 1660, the Renaissance began in Italy and spread through Europe, rebelling against the all-powerful Church by placing Man at the center of his world instead of God. The Gothic spires and pointed arches were replaced by classical domes and rounded arches, with comfortable spaces and entertaining details, in a celebration of humanity. The Baroque style was developed in response, largely by the Catholic Church to restate its religious values.

==== Renaissance ====
c. 1425–1600 (Europe, American colonies)

- Renaissance
  - Central European Renaissance
    - Polish Renaissance
  - French Renaissance
  - Eastern European Renaissance
- Palladian 1516–1580 (Venezia, Italy; revived in UK)
- Mannerism 1520–1600
  - Polish Mannerism 1550–1650
- Brâncovenesc style late 17th and early 18th centuries
- Eastern Orthodox Church 1400?+ (Southeast and Eastern Europe)

==== France ====
- Henry II 1530–1590
- Louis XIII 1601–1643

==== United Kingdom ====
- Tudor 1485–1603
- Elizabethan 1480–1620?
- Jacobean 1580–1660

==== Spain and Portugal ====
- Asturian pre-Romanesque 711 - 910 (Kingdom of Asturias)
- Mudéjar Art 13th and 16th centuries
- Spanish Renaissance 15th and 16th centuries
- Plateresque continued from Spanish Gothic – 1560 (Spain and colonies, Low Countries)
- Herrerian 1550–1650 (Spain and colonies, primarily in Castille and the surroundings of Madrid)
- Barroque Churrigueresque 17th – 1750 (Hispanic countries, primarily in Spain and Mexico)
- Modernisme 1880s - 1910s (Primarily Catalonia, but also in Valencian Community, Majorca Island and Melilla)
- Portuguese Renaissance
- Portuguese Plain style 1580–1640 (Portugal and colonies)

==== Colonial ====
- Portuguese Colonial c. 1480–1820 (Brazil, India, Macao, Africa, East Timor)
- Spanish Colonial 1520s – c. 1820s (New World, East Indies, other colonies)
- Cape Dutch 1652–1802 (Cape Colony, South Africa)
- Netherlands Indies 1609–1949
  - Old Indies 18th century-19th century
  - Indies Empire mid-18th century–late 19th century
  - New Indies late 19th century–20th century (mixed architecture)
- Dutch Colonial 1615–1674 (Treaty of Westminster) (New England)
- Chilotan 1600+ (Chiloé and southern Chile)
- First period 1625–1725 pre-American vernacular
- Architecture of the California missions 1769–1823, (California, US)
- French Colonial
- Colonial Georgian architecture

==== Baroque ====
1600–1800, up to 1900

- Andean Baroque, 1680–1780 (Viceroyalty of Peru)
- Baroque c. 1600–1750 (Europe, the Americas)
- English Baroque 1666 (Great Fire) – 1713 (Treaty of Utrecht)
- Spanish Baroque c. 1600–1760
  - Churrigueresque, 1660s–1750s (Spain & New World), revival 1915+ (southwest US, Hawaii)
  - Earthquake Baroque, 17th–18th centuries (Philippines)
- Maltese Baroque c. 1635–1798
- New Spanish Baroque, mid-17th-early-18th centuries (New Spain)
- French Baroque c. 1650–1789
- Dutch Baroque c. 1650–1700
- Sicilian Baroque 1693 earthquake – c. 1745
- Portuguese Joanine baroque c. 1700–1750
- Russian Baroque (c. 1680–1750)
  - Naryshkin Baroque c. 1690–1720 (Moscow, Russian Empire)
  - Petrine Baroque c. 1700–1745 (Saint Petersburg, Russian Empire)
  - Elizabethan Baroque 1736–1762 (Russian Empire)
- Ukrainian Baroque late 17th–18th centuries (Ukrainian lands)
- Rococo c. 1720–1789 (France, Germany, Austria, Italy, Russia, Spain)

==== Contemporary Asian Architecture with Renaissance and Post-Renaissance Europe ====
===== Japanese =====
- Shoin-zukuri (1560s–1860s)
- Sukiya-zukuri (1530s–present)
- Minka (Japanese commoner or folk architecture)
  - Gassho-zukuri (Edo period and later)
  - Honmune-zukuri (Edo period and later)
- Imperial Crown style (1919–1945)
- Giyōfū architecture (1800s)

===== Indian =====
- Indo-Islamic
- Mughal 1540- 1860 CE (Present day India, Pakistan, Bangladesh)
  - Akbari
  - Mughal Garden style
- Sharqi aka Janpur style

=== Late modern period and the Industrial Revolution ===
==== Neoclassicism ====
The time from 1720 through 1837 and onward was often depicted as a rural idyll by the great painters, but in fact was a hive of early industrial activity, with small kilns and workshops springing up wherever materials could be mined or manufactured. After the Renaissance, neoclassical forms were developed and refined into new styles for public buildings and the gentry.

New Cooperism

===== Neoclassical =====
- Neoclassical c. 1715–1820
- Beaux-Arts 1670+ (France) and 1880 (US)
- Georgian 1720–1840s (UK, US)
  - Jamaican Georgian architecture c. 1750 – c. 1850 (Jamaica)
- American Colonial 1720–1780s (US)
- Pombaline style 1755 – c. 1860 (Lisbon in Portugal)
- Josephinischer Stil 1760–1780/90 (Austria)
- Adam style 1760–1795 (England, Scotland, Russia, US)
- Federal 1780–1830 (US)
- Empire 1804–1830, revival 1870 (Europe, US)
- Regency 1811–1830 (UK)
- Antebellum 1812–1861 (Southern United States)
- Palazzo style 1814–1930? (Europe, Australia, US)
- Neo-Palladian
  - Jeffersonian 1790s–1830s (Virginia in US)
  - American Empire 1810
- Greek Revival architecture
  - Rundbogenstil 1835–1900 (Germany)
  - Neo-Grec 1845–65 (UK, US, France)
- Nordic Classicism 1910–30 (Norway, Sweden, Denmark & Finland)
- Polish Neoclassicism (Poland)
- New Classical architecture 20th/21st century (global)
- Temple 1832+ (global)

==== Revivalism and Orientalism ====
Late 19th and early 20th centuries. The Victorian Era was a time of giant leaps forward in technology and society, such as iron bridges, aqueducts, sewer systems, roads, canals, trains, and factories. As a result, engineers, inventors, and businessmen reshaped much of the architecture of the United Kingdom and the British Empire, including India, Australia, South Africa, and Canada, and influenced countries across Europe and the United States. Architecturally, they were revivalists who modified old styles to suit new purposes.

- Revivalism
- Resort architecture (Germany)
- Victorian 1837–1901 (UK)
  - See also San Francisco architecture
- Edwardian 1901–1910 (UK)

===== Revivals started before the Victorian Era =====
- Gothic Revival 1740s+ (UK, US, Europe)
  - Scots Baronial (UK)
- Italianate 1802–1890 (UK, Europe, US)
- Egyptian Revival 1809–1820s, 1840s, 1920s (Europe, US)
- Biedermeier 1815–1848 (Central Europe)
- Russian Revival 1826–1917 (Russian Empire, Germany, Middle Asia)
- Russo-Byzantine style 1861–1917 (Russian Empire, Balkans)
- Russian neoclassical revival 1900–1920 (Russian Empire)

===== Victorian revivals =====
- Renaissance Revival 1840–1890 (UK)
  - Timber frame revivals in various styles (Europe)
  - Black-and-white Revival 1811+ (UK especially Chester)
  - Jacobethan 1830–1870 (UK)
  - Tudorbethan aka Mock Tudor 1835–1885+ (UK)
- Baroque Revival aka Neo-Baroque 1840?-
  - Bristol Byzantine 1850–1880
  - Edwardian Baroque 1901–1922 (UK & British Empire)
- Second Empire 1855–1880 (France, UK, US, Canada, Australia)
  - Napoleon III style 1852–1870 (Paris, France)
- Queen Anne style 1870–1910s (UK, US)
- Romanian Revival 1884-1940s (Romania)

===== Orientalism =====
- Orientalism
- Neo-Mudéjar 1880s–1920s (Spain, Portugal, Bosnia, California)
- Moorish Revival (US, Europe)
- Egyptian Revival 1920s (Europe, US; see above)
- Mayan Revival 1920–1930s (US)
- Indo-Saracenic Revival or Indo-Gothic, Mughal-Gothic, Neo-Mughal late 19th century (also influenced by British India, British Raj)

===== Revivals in North America =====
- Romanesque Revival 1840–1930s (US)
- Gothic Revival (see above)
  - Carpenter Gothic 1870+ (US)
  - High Victorian Gothic (English-speaking world)
  - Collegiate Gothic, 1910–1960 (US)
- Stick style 1860–1890+ (US)
- Queen Anne style architecture (United States) 1880–1910s (US)
  - Eastlake style 1879–1905 (US)
- Richardsonian Romanesque 1880s–1905 (US)
- Shingle style 1879–1905
- Neo-Byzantine 1882–1920s (US)
- Renaissance Revival
  - American Renaissance
  - Châteauesque 1887–1930s (Canada, US, Hungary)
    - Canadian Chateau 1880s–1920s (Canada)
  - Mediterranean Revival 1890s+ (US, Latin America, Europe)
- Mission Revival 1894–1936; (California, southwest US)
  - Pueblo Revival 1898–1930+ (southwest US)
- Colonial Revival 1890s+
- Dutch Colonial Revival c. 1900 (New England)
- Spanish Colonial Revival 1915+ (Mexico, California, Hawaii, Florida, southwest US)
- Beaux-Arts Revival 1880+ (US, Canada), 1920+ (Australia)
- City Beautiful 1890–20th century (US)
- Territorial Revival architecture 1930+

==== Other late 19th century styles ====
- Australian styles
  - Queenslander 1840s–1960s (Australian)
  - Federation 1890–1920 (Australian)
- Heimatstil 1870–1900 (Austria, Germany, Switzerland
- Neoclásico Isabelino 1843–1897 (Ponce, Puerto Rico)
- Neo-Manueline 1840s–1910s (Portugal, Brazil, Portuguese colonies)
- Dragestil 1880s–1910s (Norway)
- Palazzo style architecture
- Neo-Plateresque and Monterrey style 19th-early 20th centuries (Spain, Mexico)

==== Rural styles ====
- Swiss chalet style 1840s–1920s+ (Scandinavia, Austria, Germany, later global)
- Adirondack 1850s (New York, US)
- National Park Service rustic aka Parkitecture 1903+ (US)
- Western false front (Western United States)

==== Reactions to the Industrial Revolution ====
===== Industrial =====
- Industrial, 1760–present (worldwide)

===== Arts and Crafts in Europe =====
- Arts and Crafts 1880–1910 (UK)
- Art Nouveau aka Jugendstil 1885–1910
  - Modernisme 1888–1911 (Catalan Art Nouveau)
  - Glasgow style 1890–1910 (Glasgow, Scotland)
  - Vienna Secession 1897–1905 (Austrian Art Nouveau)
  - Liberty style 1899-1914 (Italian Art Nouveau)
- National Romantic style 1900–1923? (Norway, Sweden, Denmark and Finland)

===== Arts and Crafts in the US =====
- American Craftsman, aka American Arts and Crafts 1890s–1930 (US)
- Prairie style 1900–1917 (US)
- American Foursquare mid-1890s – late 1930s (US)
- California Bungalow 1910–1939 (US, Australia, then global)

=== Modernism and other styles contemporary with modernism ===
From 1880 onwards, the Industrial Revolution brought steel, plate glass, and mass-produced components. These enabled structural frames with clean lines and plain or shiny surfaces. In the early stages, a popular motto was "decoration is a crime". For example, in the Eastern Bloc of the USSR, the Communists rejected the Western Bloc's "decadent" ways, and modernism developed in a markedly more bureaucratic, somber, and monumental fashion.

- Avant-garde
  - Russian avant-garde 1890–1930 (Russian Empire/Soviet Union)
  - Futurism 1909 (Europe)
- Chicago School 1880–1920, 1940s–1960s (US)
- Functionalism c. 1900 – 1930s (Europe, US)
- Expressionism 1910 – c. 1924
  - Brick Expressionism
  - Amsterdam School 1912–1924 (Netherlands)
- Organic architecture (Germany, Northern Europe)
- New Objectivity 1920–1939 (Italy, Germany, Netherlands, Budapest)
- Rationalism 1920s–1930s (Italy)
- Bauhaus 1919–1930+ (Germany, Northern Europe, Israel)
- De Stijl 1920s (Netherlands, Europe)
- Moderne 1925+ (global)
  - Art Deco 1925–1940s (global, list)
  - Streamline Moderne 1930–1937
- Modernism 1927–1960s
- International style 1930+ (Europe, US)
- Usonian 1936–1940s (US)

==== Communist ====
- Constructivism 1925–1932 (USSR)
- Postconstructivism 1932–1941 (USSR)
- Stalinist 1933–1955 (USSR)

==== Fascist/Nazi ====
- Fascist architecture
- Nazi 1933–1944 (Germany)

==== Post-Second World War ====
- Modernism (continued)
- International style (continued)
- New towns 1946–1968+ (UK, global)
- Mid-century modern 1950s (California, etc.)
- Googie 1950s (US)
- Brutalism 1950s–1970s
- Structuralism 1950s–1970s
  - Megastructures 1960s
- Metabolist 1959 (Japan)
- Danish Functionalism 1960s (Denmark)
- Tendenza 1965-1985 (Italy)
- High-tech/Structural Expressionism 1970s+
  - Bowellism 1975s+

===== Other 20th century styles =====
- Heimatschutz Architecture 1900–1940 (Austria, Germany)
- Ponce Creole 1895–1920 (Ponce in Puerto Rico)
- Heliopolis style 1905 – c. 1935 (Egypt)
- Traditionalist School 1910–1960 (Netherlands, Northern Europe)
- Minimal Traditional 1930s–1940s (US)
- Soft Portuguese 1940–1955 (Portugal & colonies)
- Ranch-style 1940s–1970s (US)
- Jengki style (Indonesia)

==== Postmodernism and Early 21st century styles ====
- Postmodernism 1960+ (US, UK)
  - Deconstructivism 1982+ (Europe, US, Far East)
  - Shed style
- Arcology 1970s+ (Europe)
- Critical regionalism 1983+
- Interactive architecture 2000+
- Sustainable architecture 2000+
  - Earthship 1980+ (Started in US, now global)
  - Green building 2000+
  - Natural building 2000+
- Neo-Andean 2005+
- Neo-futurism late 1960s-early 21st century
- New Classical Architecture 1980+
  - Berlin style 1990s+
- Blobitecture 2003+
- Parametricism 2008+
- Mass timber 2010s+

=== Fortified styles ===
- Fortification 6800 BC+
  - Ringfort 800 BC – 400 AD
  - Dzong 17th century+
  - Star fort 1530–1800?
  - Polygonal fort 1850?-

=== Vernacular styles ===
- Vernacular architecture

==== Generic methods ====
- Natural building
- Ice – Igloo, quinzhee
- Earth – Cob house, sod house, adobe, mudbrick house, rammed earth
- Timber – Log cabin, log house, Carpenter Gothic, roundhouse, stilt house
- Nomadic structures – Yaranga, bender tent
- Temporary structures – Quonset hut, Nissen hut, prefabricated home
- Underground – Underground living, rock-cut architecture, monolithic church, pit-house
- Modern low-energy systems – Straw-bale construction, earthbag construction, rice-hull bagwall construction, earthship, earth house
- Various styles – Longhouse

==== European ====
- European Arctic (North Norway and Sweden, Finland, North Russia) – Sami lavvu, Sami goahti
- Northwest Europe (Norway, Sweden, Fresia, Jutland, Denmark, North Poland, UK, Iceland) – Norse architecture, heathen hofs, Viking ring fortress, fogou, souterrain, Grubenhaus (also known as Grubhouse or Grubhut)
- Central and Eastern Europe – Burdei, zemlyanka
- Bulgaria – Rock-hewn Churches of Ivanovo
- Estonia
- Germany – Black Forest house, Swiss chalet style, Gulf house (aka East Frisian house), Geestharden house (aka Cimbrian house, Schleswig house), Haubarg, Low German house (aka Low Saxon house), Middle German house, Reed house, Seaside resort house, Ständerhaus, Uthland-Frisian house
- Netherlands – Frisian farmhouse, Old Frisian longhouse, Bildts farmhouse
- Iceland – Turf houses
- Ireland – Clochán, Crannog
- Italy – Trullo
- Lithuania – Kaunas modernism, Lithuanian folk architecture, Polish-Lithuanian wooden synagogues
- Norway – Architecture of Norway: Post church, Palisade church, Stave church, Norwegian Turf house, Vernacular architecture in Norway, Rorbu, Dragestil, also National Romantic style, Swiss chalet style and Nordic Classicism buildings
- Poland – Zakopane, Polish-Lithuanian wooden synagogues, wooden churches of Southern Lesser Poland, Upper Lusatian house
- Romania – Carpathian vernacular, wooden churches of Maramureș
- Russia – Dacha
- Scotland – Medieval turf building in Cronberry, blackhouses
- Slovakia – Wooden churches of the Slovak Carpathians
- Spain – Asturian teito, Asturian hórreo, Gallician palloza
- Ukraine – Wooden churches
- United Kingdom – Dartmoor longhouse, Neolithic long house, palisade church, mid-20th-century system-built houses
  - Scotland – Broch, Atlantic roundhouse, crannog, dun

==== North American ====
- Shotgun house (US)
- Florida Cracker c. 1800+ (Florida, US)
- Tidewater (US)
- Sibley tent (US)
- Sod house (US)
- Cape Cod (New England, US)
- Saltbox (New England, US)
- Farmhouse (US)
- Brownstone (US)
- Bay-and-gable (CAN)

==== Native American ====
- Navajo hogan
- Pacific northwest plank house
- Plains nations tipi and earth lodge
- Wigwam
- Northeast nations wetu
- Pueblo kiva
- Colombian plateau nations quiggly hole
- Southwest nations jacal
- Southwestern cliff dwellings
- Seminole chickee
- Sweat lodge, temazcal
- Amerindian longhouses

==== South American ====
- Argentina – Mar del Plata style
- Chile – Chilotan architecture
- Venezuela and Chile – Palafito

==== African ====
- Central and South African countries – Rondavel, Xhosa and Zulu Architecture, Zimbabwean Architecture, Sotho-Tswana Architecture, Zulu and Nguni Architecture, and Madagascan Architecture
- Dutch Colonial, Cape Dutch
- West African countries – Igbo architecture

==== Asian ====
- China
  - Yaodong
  - Siheyuan
  - Tulou
  - Shanxi
  - Hokkien
  - Cantonese
  - Hui
  - Hakka
  - Jiangxi
  - Sichuan
  - Pang uk (Architecture of Hong Kong)
- India – Rock-cut, Toda hut
- Indonesia – Rumah adat
- Iran, Turkey – Caravanserai
- Iran – Yakhchal
- Israel – Rock-cut tombs
- Japan – Minka
- Mongolia – Yurt
- Papua New Guinea – Papua New Guinea stilt house
- Philippines – Bahay kubo, Jin-jin, Torogan, Bale
- Russia – Siberian chum
- Thailand – Thai stilt house
- Myanmar – Shwenandaw Monastery

==== Australasian ====
- Australia, New Zealand – slab hut
- Australia – Aboriginal humpy

== Alphabetical listing ==
- Acadian architecture 1604 Canada
- Adam style 1770 England
- Adirondack Architecture 1850s New York, US
- Anglo-Saxon architecture 450s–1066 England and Wales
- American colonial architecture 1720–1780s US
- American Craftsman 1890s–1930 US, California & east
- American Empire 1810
- American Foursquare mid. 1890s-late 1930s US
- Amsterdam School 1912–1924 Netherlands
- Ancient Egyptian architecture 3000 BC – 373 AD
- Ancient Greek architecture 776 BC – 265 BC
- Angevin Gothic since 1148, western France
- Arcology 1970s AD–present
- Art Deco 1925–1940s Europe & US
- Art Nouveau c. 1885–1910
- 1880s–1920s; UK, California, US
- Armenian architecture 3000 BC – present
- Australian architectural styles
- Baroque architecture
- Bauhaus
- Beaux-Arts architecture
- Berlin style 1990s+
- Biedermeier 1815–1848
- Blobitecture 2003–present
- Bowellism 1957–present
- Brick Gothic c. 1350 – c. 15th century
- Bristol Byzantine 1850–1880
- Brownstone
- Brutalist architecture 1950s–1970s
- Buddhist architecture 1st century BC
- Byzantine architecture 527 AD (Sofia) – 1520
- Cape Cod 17th century
- Carolingian architecture 780s–9th century; France and Germany
- Carpenter Gothic US and Canada 1840s on
- Châteauesque 1870s-1900s Canada and Northeastern USA
- Chicago school 1880s and 1890 US
- Chilotan architecture 1600–present Chiloé and southern Chile
- Churrigueresque, 1660s–1750s; Spain and the New World
- City Beautiful movement 1890–20th century US
- Classical architecture 600 BC – 323 AD
- Colonial Revival architecture
- Constructivist architecture
- Danish Functionalism 1960s AD Denmark
- Deconstructivism 1982–present
- Decorated period c. 1290 – c. 1350
- Dragestil 1880s–1910s, Norway
- Dutch Colonial 1615–1674 (Treaty of Westminster) New England
- Dutch Colonial Revival c. 1900 New England
- Dzong Architecture Tibet and Bhutan
- Early English period c. 1190 – c. 1250
- Ephemeral architecture
- Eastlake style 1879–1905 New England
- Egyptian Revival architecture 1809–1820s, 1840s, 1920s
- Elizabethan architecture (1533–1603)
- Empire 1804–1814, 1870 revival
- English Baroque 1666 (Great Fire) – 1713 (Treaty of Utrecht)
- Expressionist architecture 1910 – c. 1924
- Farmhouse
- Federal architecture 1780–1830 US
- Federation architecture 1890–1915 Australia
- Florida cracker architecture c. 1800 – present Florida, US
- Florida modern 1950s or Tropical Modernism
- Functionalism c. 1900 – 1930s Europe & US
- Futurist architecture 1909 Europe
- Georgian architecture 1720–1840s UK & US
- Googie architecture 1950s US and Canada
- Gothic architecture
- Gothic Revival architecture 1760s–1840s
- Gotico Angioino, since 1266, southern Italy
- Greek Revival architecture
- Green building 2000–present
- Heliopolis style 1905 – c. 1935 Egypt
- Indian architecture India
- Interactive architecture 2000–present
- International style 1930–present
- Isabelline Gothic 1474–1505 (reign) Spain
- Islamic Architecture 691–present
- Italianate architecture 1802
- Jacobean architecture 1580–1660
- Jacobethan 1838
- Jeffersonian architecture 1790s–1830s Virginia, US
- Jengki style 1950s Indonesia
- Jugendstil c. 1885–1910 German term for Art Nouveau
- Manueline 1495–1521 (reign) Portugal and colonies
- Mediterranean Revival style 1890s–present; US, Latin America, Europe
- Memphis Group 1981–1988
- Merovingian architecture 5th–8th centuries; France and Germany
- Metabolist Movement 1959 Japan
- Mid-century modern 1950s–1960s California, US, Latin America
- Mission Revival architecture 1894–1936; California, US
- Modern movement 1927–1960s
- Modernisme 1888–1911 Catalan Art Nouveau
- National Park Service Rustic 1872–present US
- Natural building 2000–
- Nazi architecture 1933–1944 Germany
- Neo-Byzantine architecture 1882–1920s American
- Neoclassical architecture
- Neo-Grec 1848–1865
- Neo-Gothic architecture
- Neolithic architecture 10,000–3000 BC
- Neo-Manueline 1840s–1910s AD Portugal and Brazil
- New towns 1946–1968 United Kingdom
- Norman architecture 1074–1250
- Organic architecture
- Ottonian architecture 950s–1050s Germany
- Palladian architecture 1616–1680 (Jones)
- Perpendicular period c. 1350 – c. 1550
- Plantagenet style since 1148, western France
- Southern plantation architecture
- Ponce Creole 1895–1920 Ponce, Puerto Rico
- Pombaline style 1755 earthquake – c. 1860 Portugal
- Postmodern architecture 1980s
- Polish cathedral style 1870–1930
- Polite architecture
- Prairie style 1900–1917 US
- Pueblo style 1898–1990s
- Qajaresque Neo-Baroque architecture 1840s–1890s Iran
- Shingle style 1879–1905 New England
- Queen Anne style architecture 1870–1910s UK and US
- Queenslander 1840s–1960s
- Ranch-style 1940s–1970s US
- Repoblación architecture 880s–11th century; Spain
- Regency architecture
- Richardsonian Romanesque 1880s US
- Rococo
- Roman architecture 753 BC – 663 AD
- Romanesque architecture 1050–1100
- Romanesque Revival architecture 1840–1900 US
- Russian architecture 989 – 18th century
- Russian Revival 1826–1917, 1990s–present
- Saltbox
- San Francisco architecture
- Scottish Baronial
- Second Empire 1865–1880
- Serbo-Byzantine revival Interwar period
- Sicilian Baroque 1693 earthquake – c. 1745
- Soft Portuguese style 1940–1955 Portugal & colonies
- Spanish Colonial Revival style 1915–present; California, Hawaii, Florida, Southwest US
- Spanish Colonial style 1520s – c. 1820s; New World, East Indies, other colonies
- c. 1900–present; California, Florida, US, Latin America, Spain.
- Stalinist architecture 1933–1955 USSR
- Stave churches, oldest 845(d) in England, Norway one 11th century, several 12th century
- Stick style 1860–1890s
- Storybook 1920s
- Streamline Moderne 1930–1937
- Structural Expressionism 1980s–present
- Structuralism 1950–1975
- Sudano-Sahelian architecture
- Sumerian architecture 5300 – 2000 BC
- Sustainable architecture 2000–present
- Swiss chalet style 1840s–1920s, Scandinavia and Germany
- Tidewater architecture 19th century
- Tudor architecture 1485–1603
- Tudorbethan architecture 1835–1885
- Ukrainian Baroque late 1600 – 19th century
- Ukrainian Architectural Modern early 20th century
- Usonian 1936–1940s US
- Victorian architecture 1837–1901 UK
- Vienna Secession 1897 – c. 1905 Austrian Art Nouveau

== Examples of styles ==
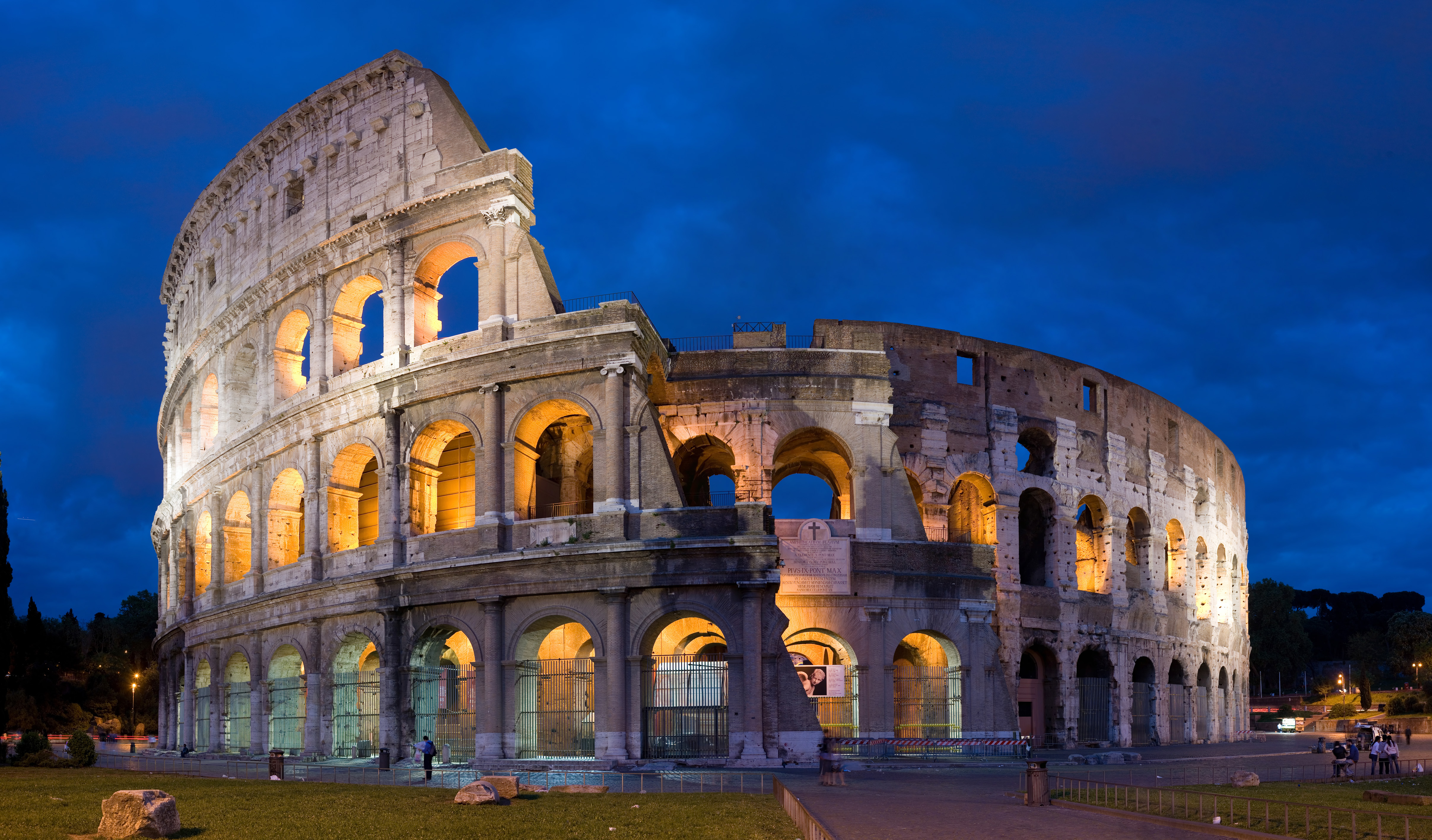
Ancient Roman architecture: Colosseum, an amphitheater in Rome, Italy (1st century AD)

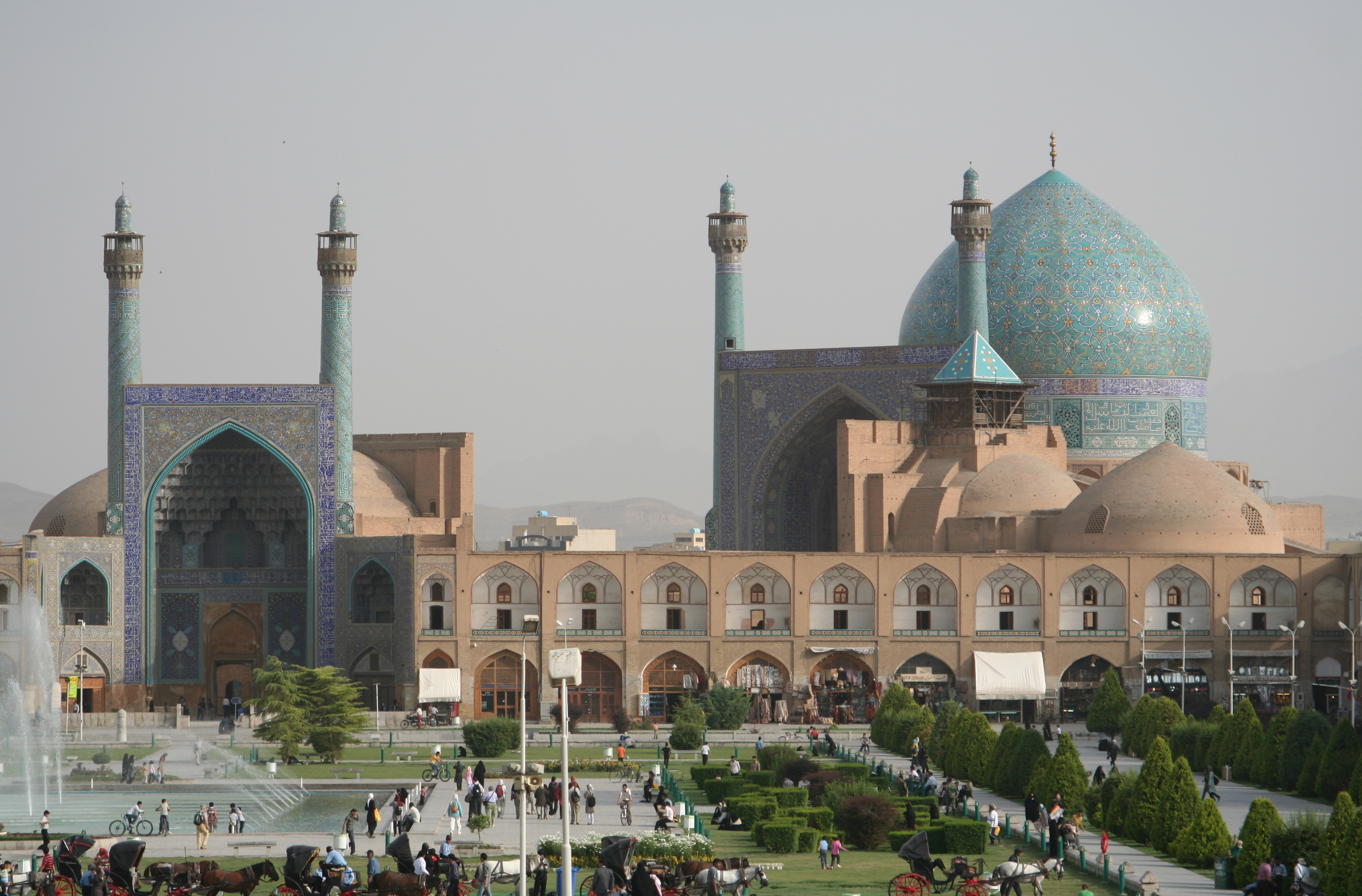
Persian Islamic architecture from the 7th- to 9th-century period: the Shah Mosque, Naqsh-i Jahan Square, Iran

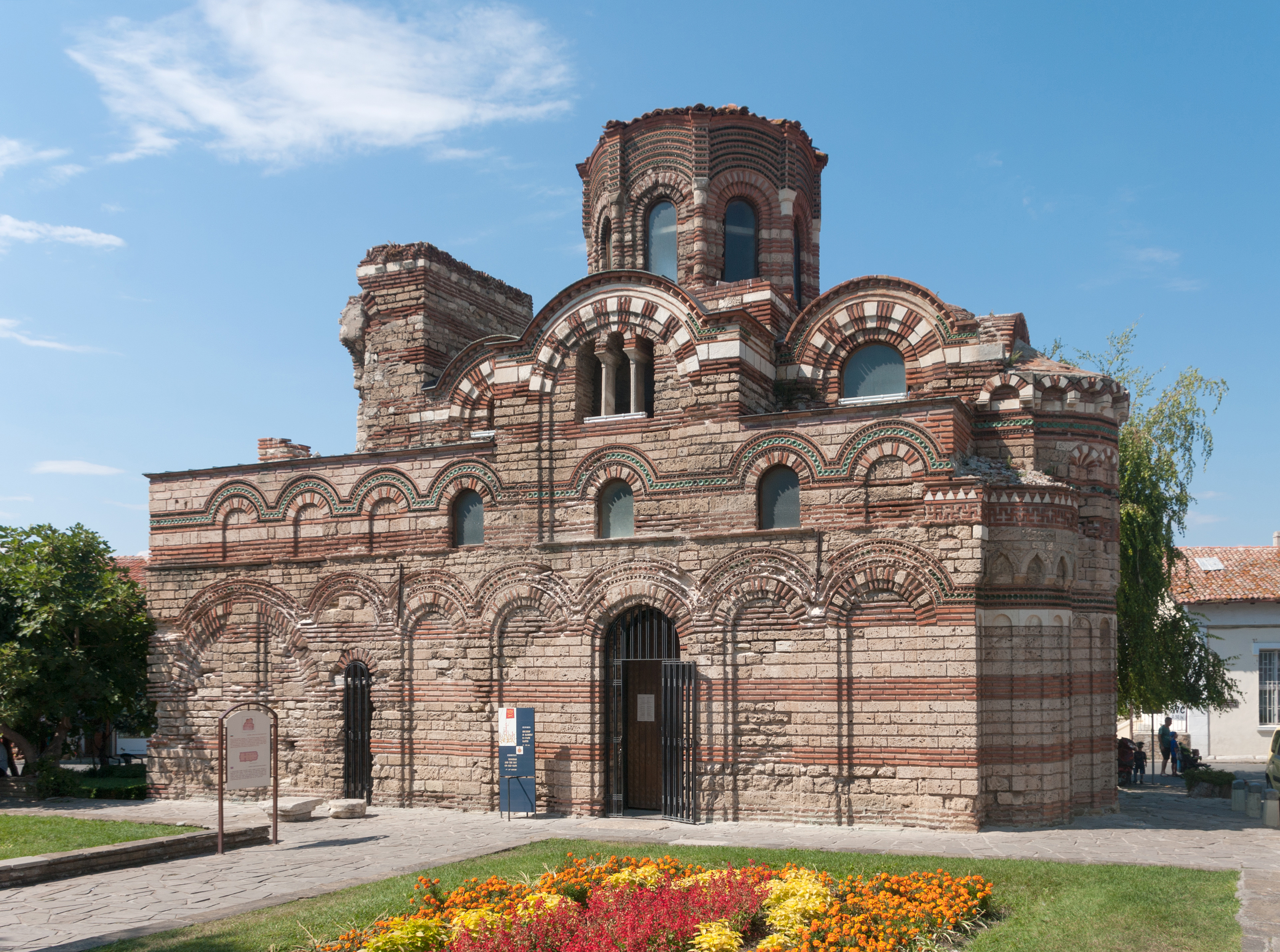
Late Byzantine architecture of the Tarnovo school in Bulgaria

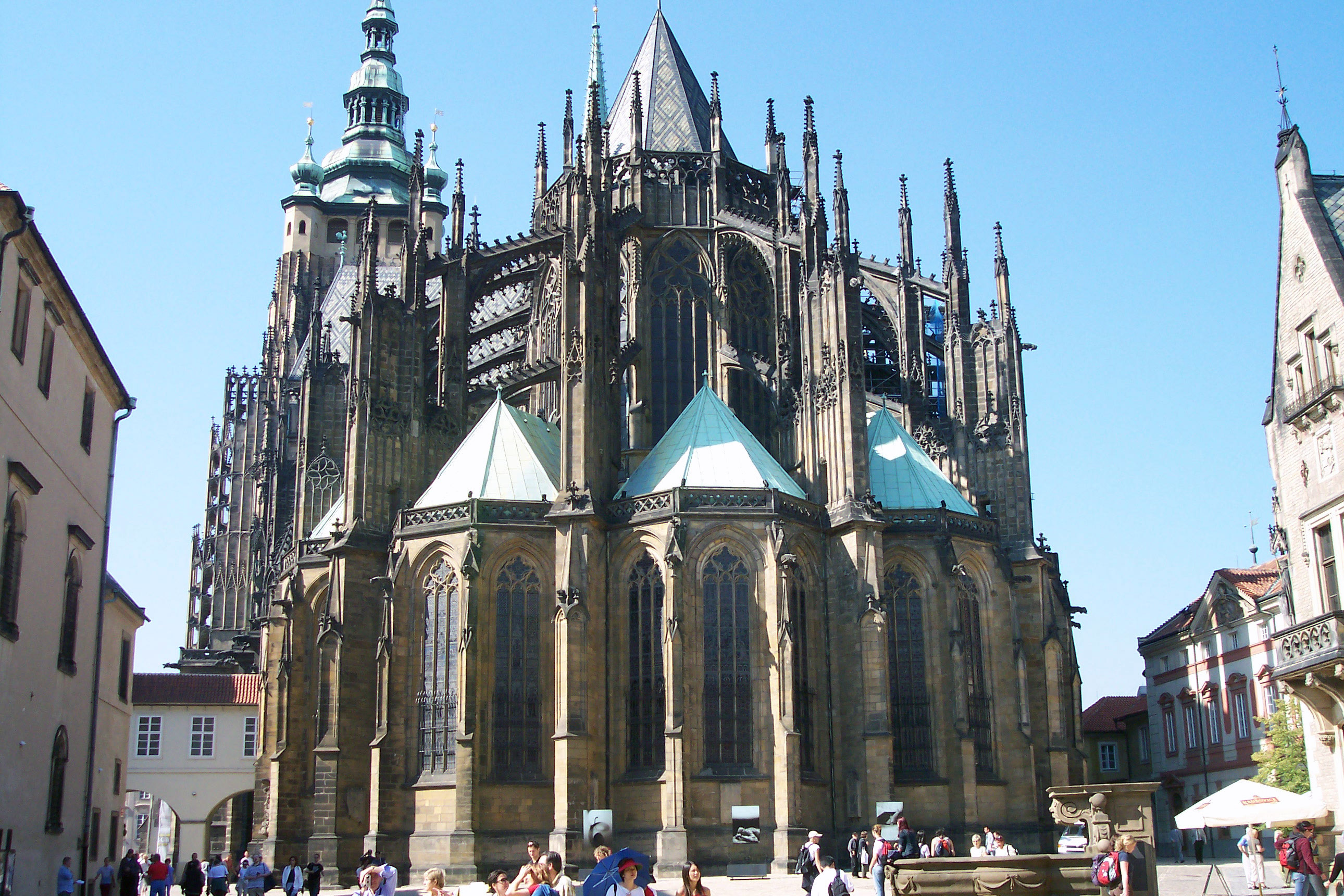
Gothic architecture: St. Vitus Cathedral in Prague, Czech Republic

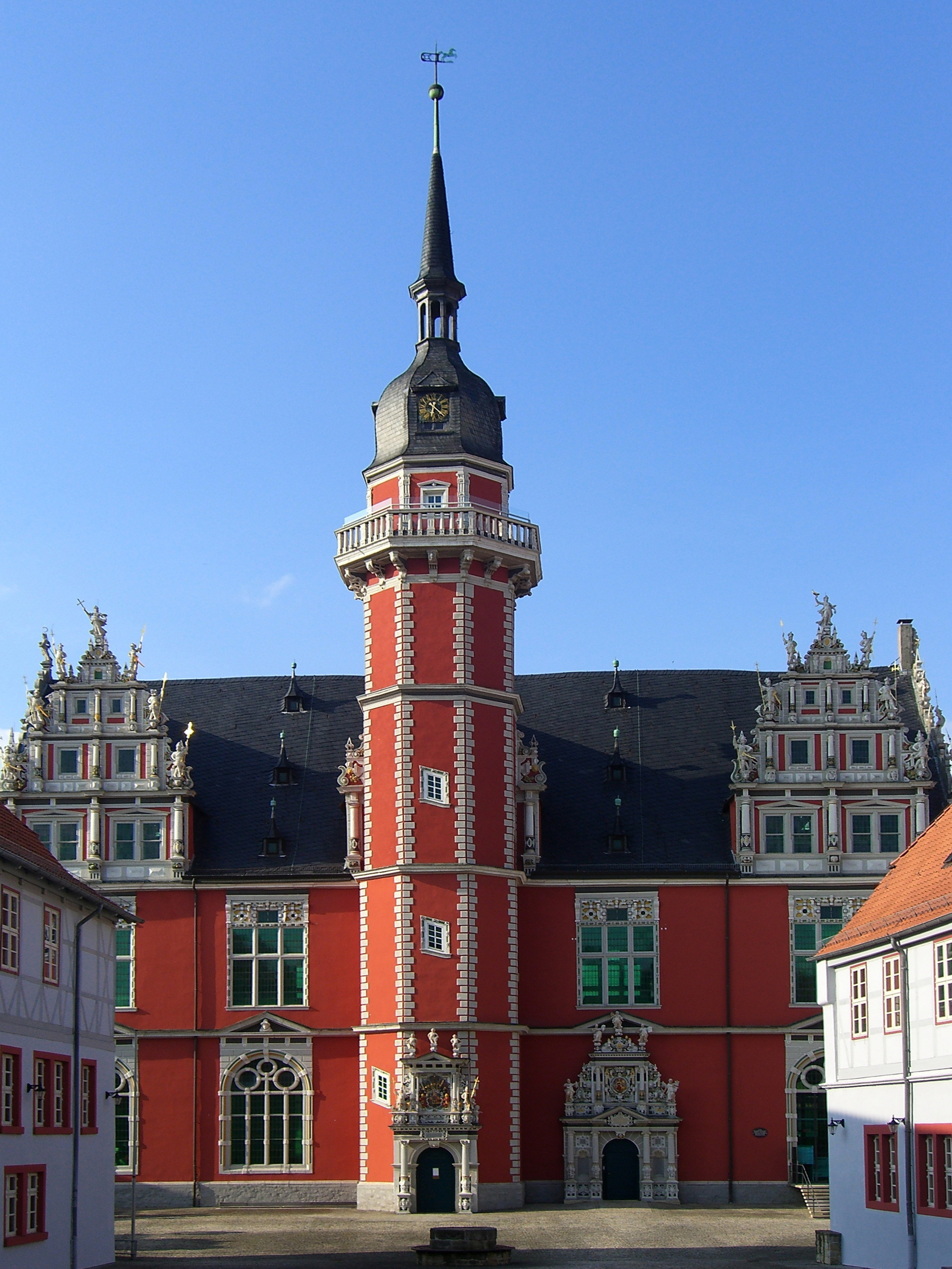
Weser Renaissance style: Juleum in Helmstedt, Germany

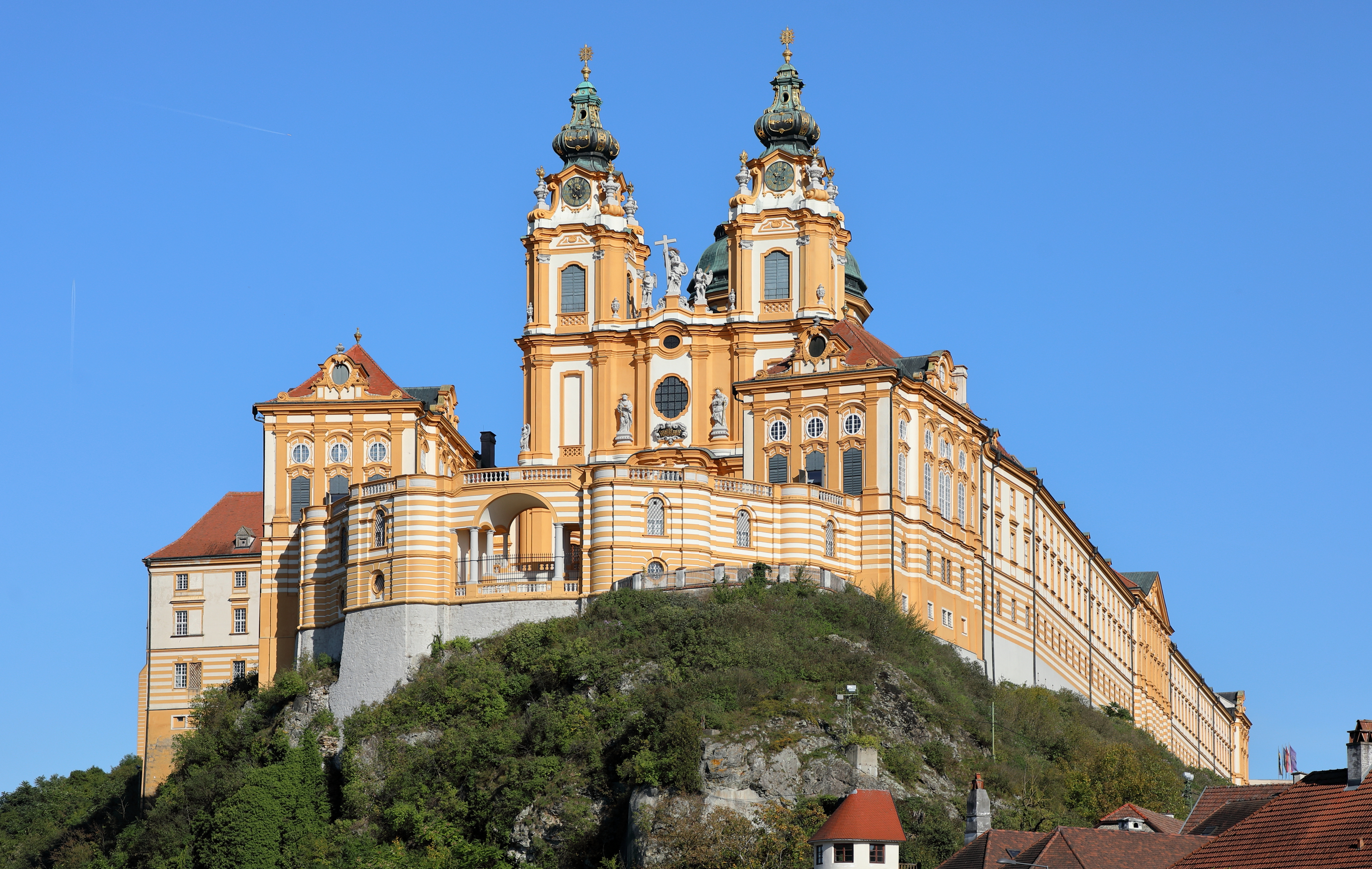
Baroque architecture: Melk Abbey, Austria

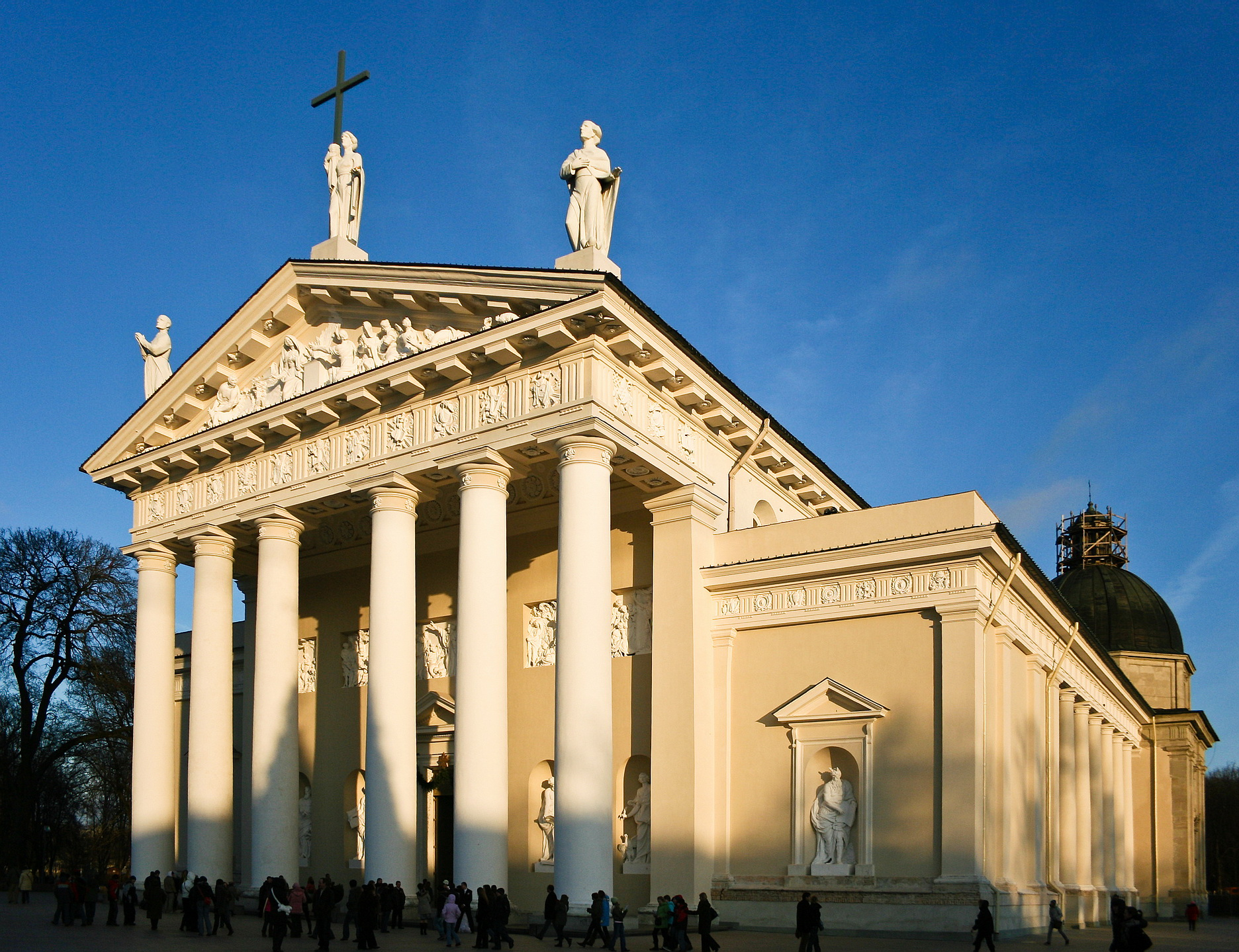
Neoclassical architecture: Cathedral of Vilnius in Lithuania

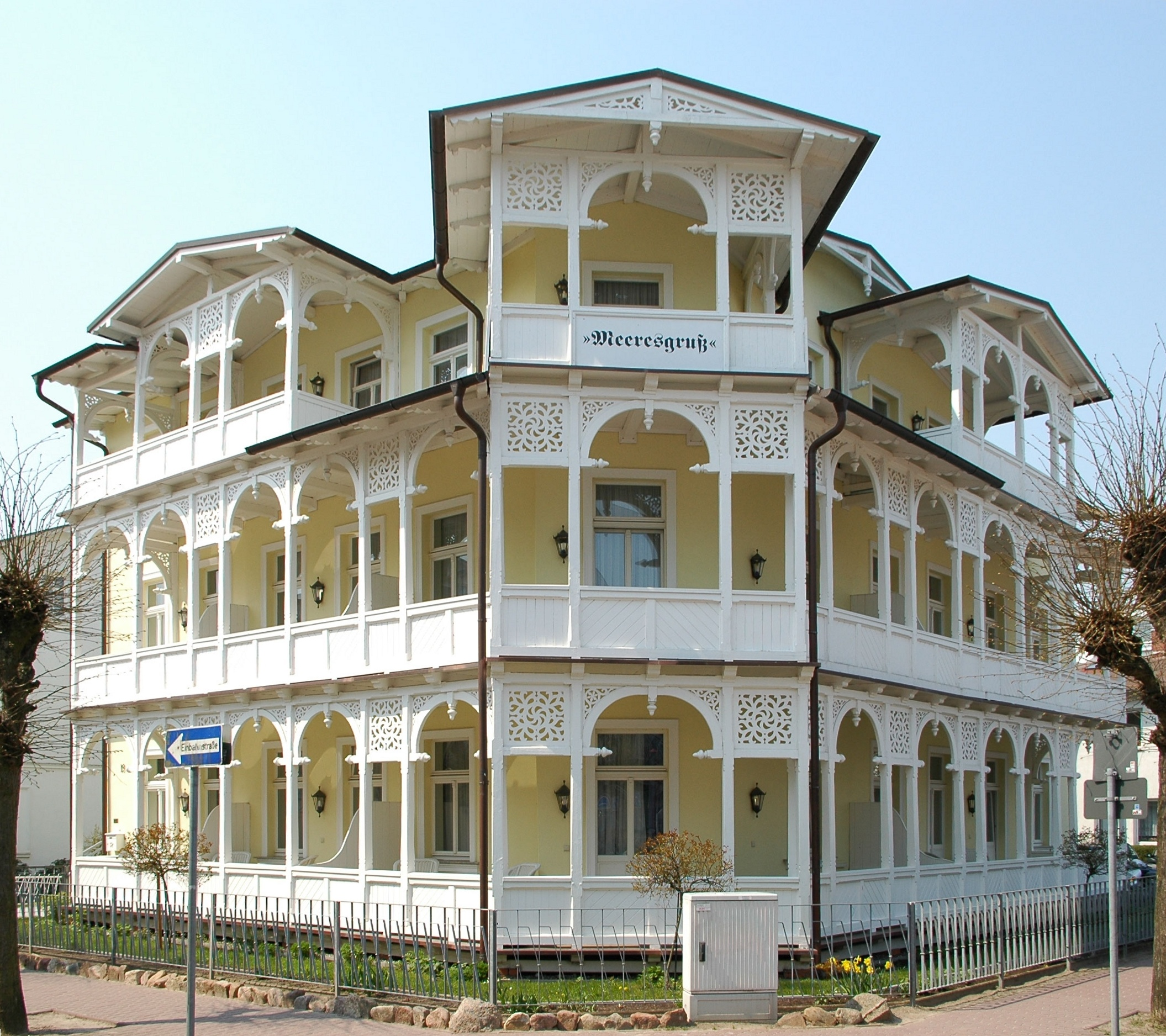
Historicism: Resort architecture in Binz on Rugia Island, a specific style common in German seaside resorts

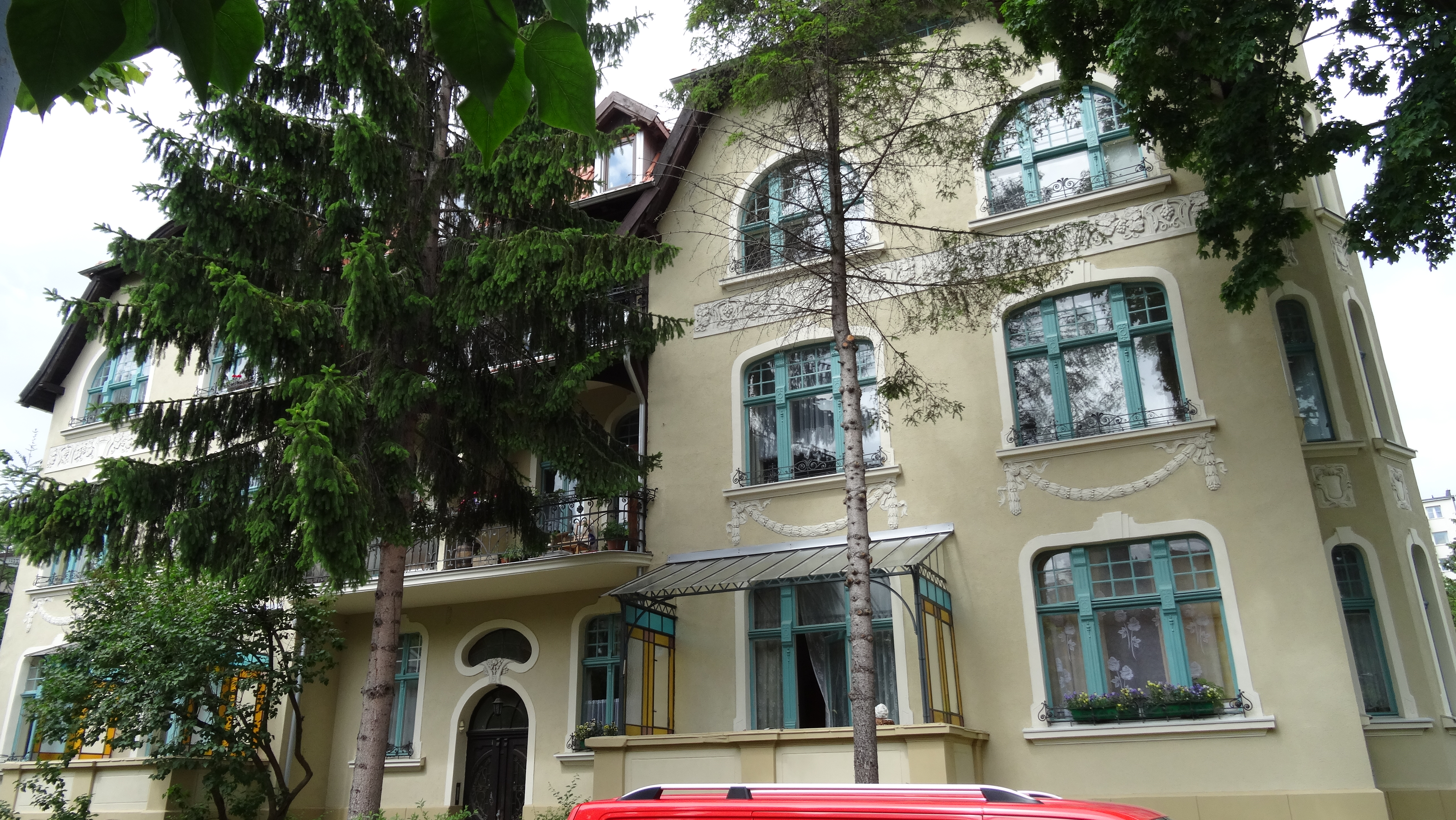
Secession: Tenement house in Sopot, Poland, built 1904

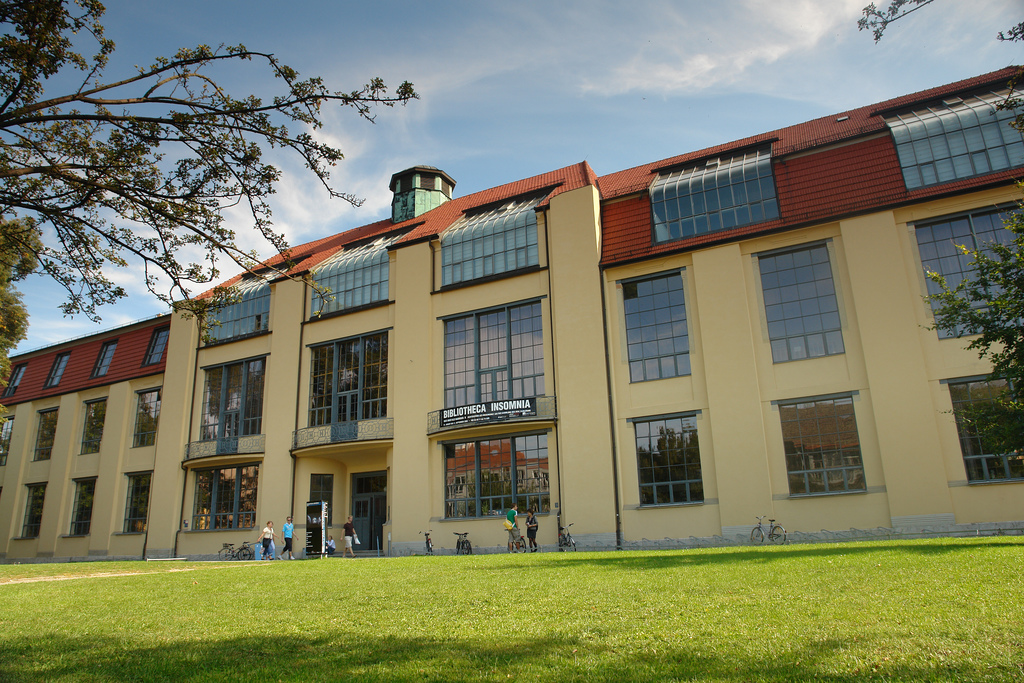
Early modern architecture: Bauhaus University in Weimar, Germany, built 1911

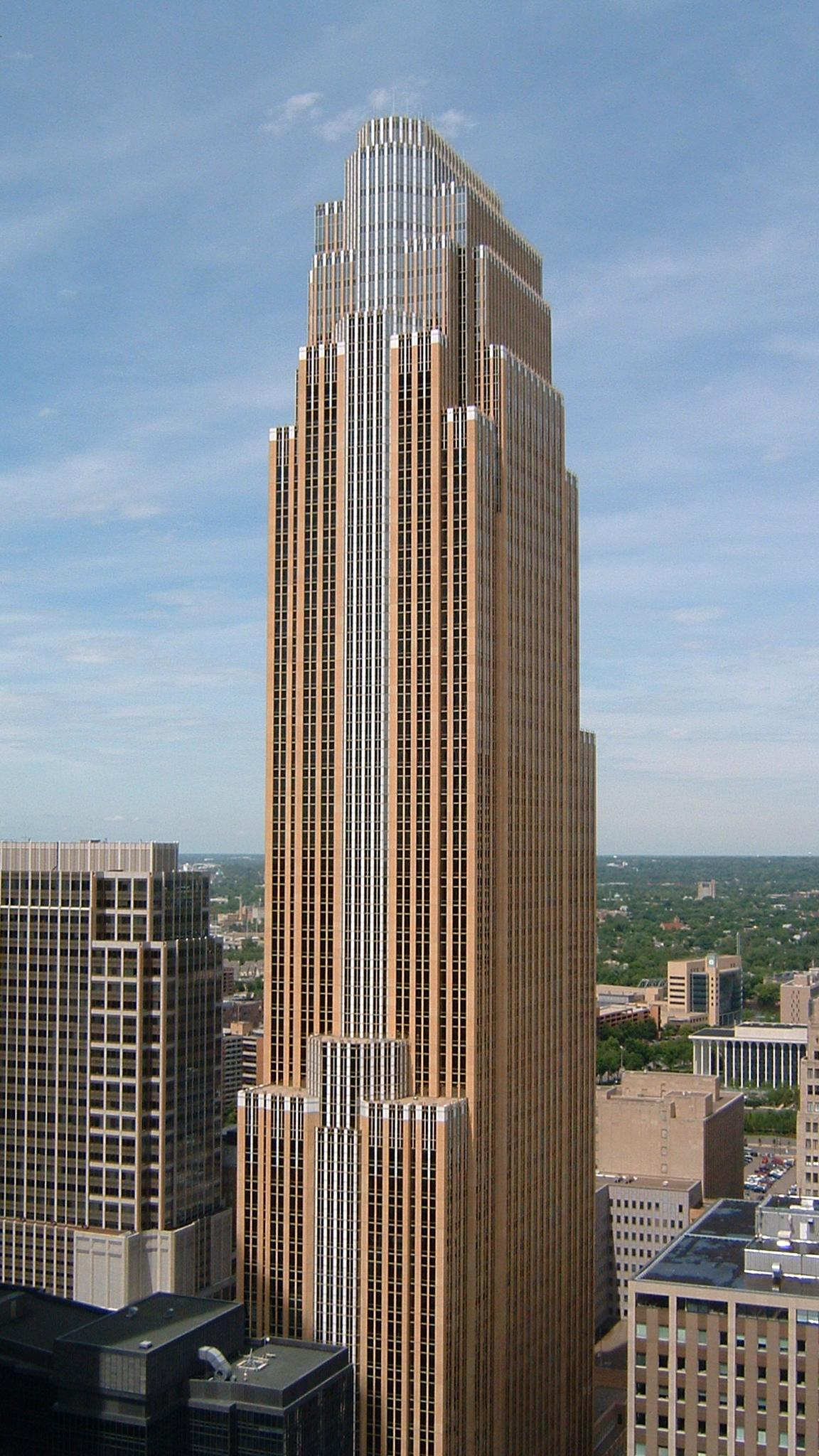
Postmodern architecture: Wells Fargo Center in Minneapolis, Minnesota, U.S., completed 1988

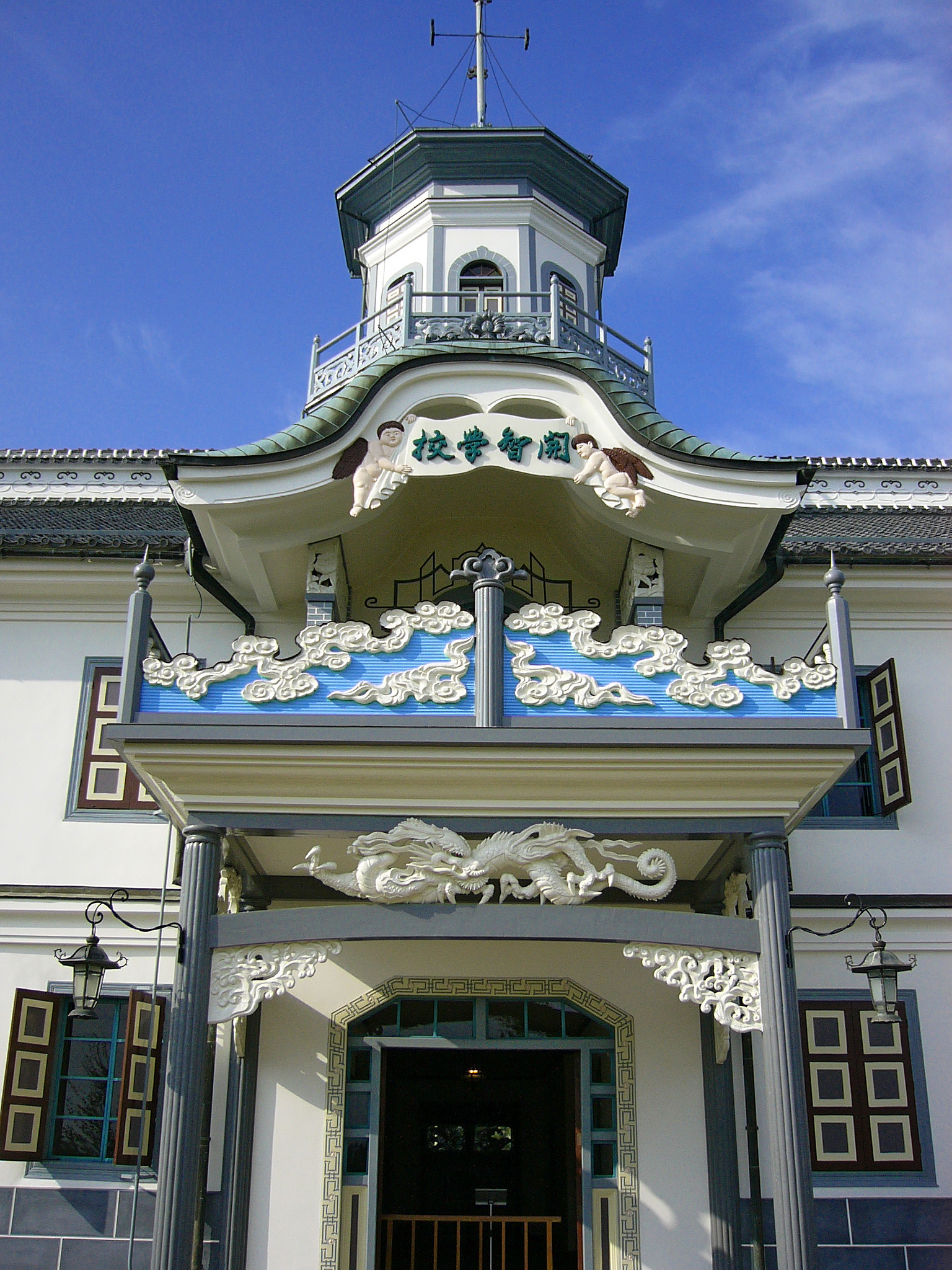
A stylised façade in Giyōfū architecture: Kaichi School Museum Japan (1800s)

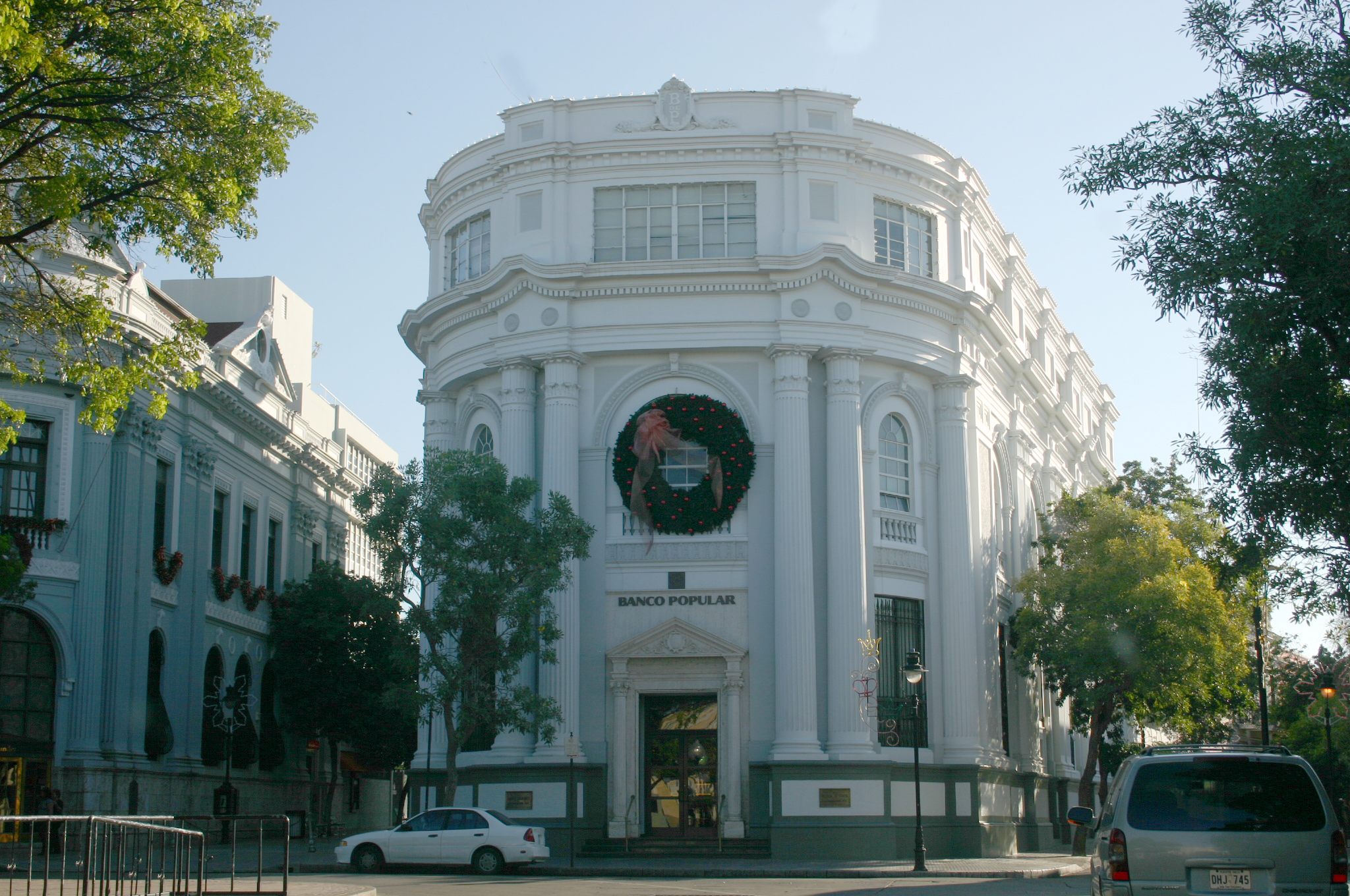
Beaux-Arts architecture in a bank's building façade in Puerto Rico

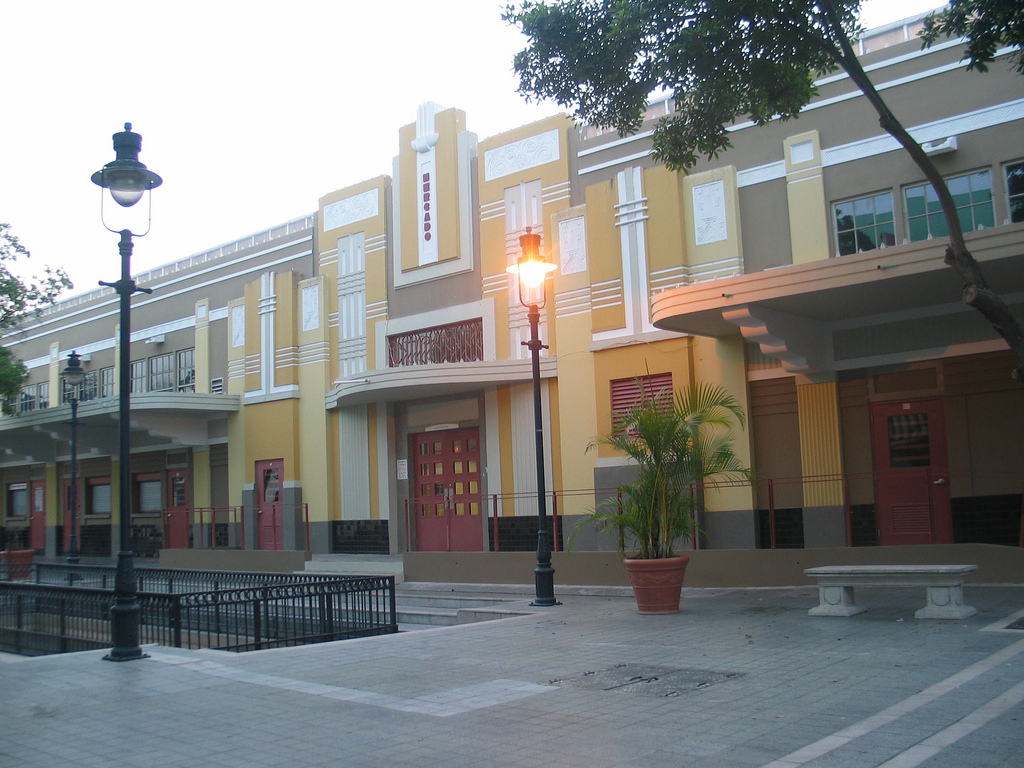
Art Deco architecture in a city marketplace building

== See also ==
- Architectural design values
- List of house styles
- National Register of Historic Places architectural style categories
- Sacred architecture
- Timeline of architecture
- Timeline of architectural styles
- Traditional architecture
