= Gaiola (construction) =

Masonry building reinforced with an internal wooden cage

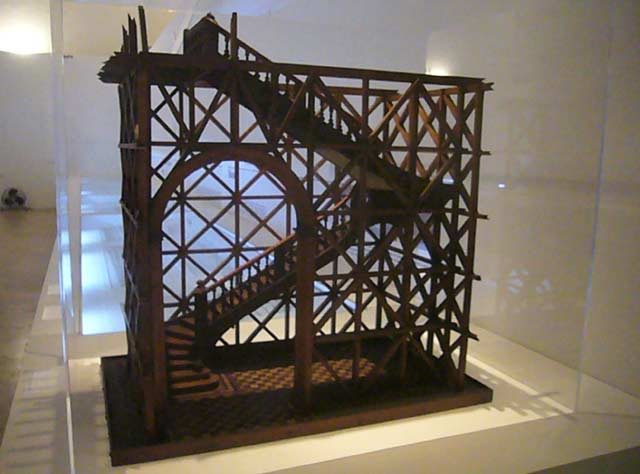
Model of the seismically protective wooden structure, the "gaiola pombalina" (pombaline cage), developed for the reconstruction of Lisbon

A gaiola pombalina (Pombaline cage; Portuguese pronunciation: [ɡɐjˈjɔlɐ]) is a masonry building reinforced with an internal wooden cage, developed as an anti-seismic construction system in Portugal after the 1755 Lisbon earthquake and implemented during the reconstruction of Lisbon Baixa (Lisbon downtown).

== Background ==
The catastrophic event of 1755 showed the fragility of the masonry construction, which is not able to absorb and dissipate the energy released by the earthquake. Downtown Lisbon was heavily damaged and, in anticipation of similar catastrophe, a new construction method was developed. The entire downtown was razed to make way for a rebuilding initiative, which was centered on the gaiola pombalina system. The term gaiola meant "cage" and was named after the Sebastião José de Carvalho e Melo, the first Marquis of Pombal. He was the Portuguese minister who introduced the building method.

Features of the old buildings that survived were retained while those that did not were replaced. There are sources that cite the construction methods in shipbuilding as the inspiration of the three-dimensional wooden structure. Wood, being deformable, resists the forces of tension and compression that occur during an earthquake.

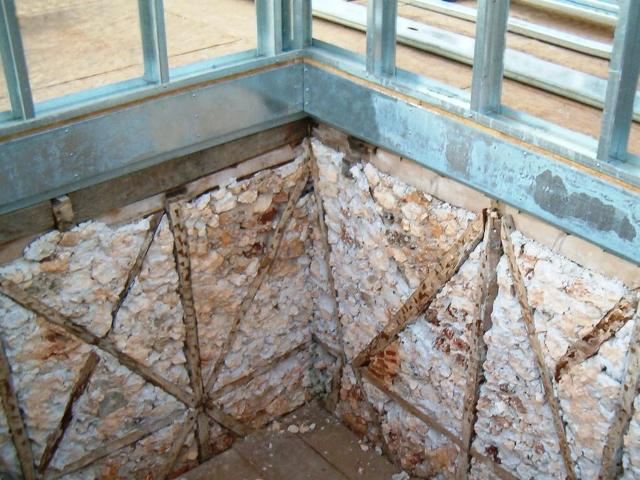
An interior view of a constructed gaiola structure.

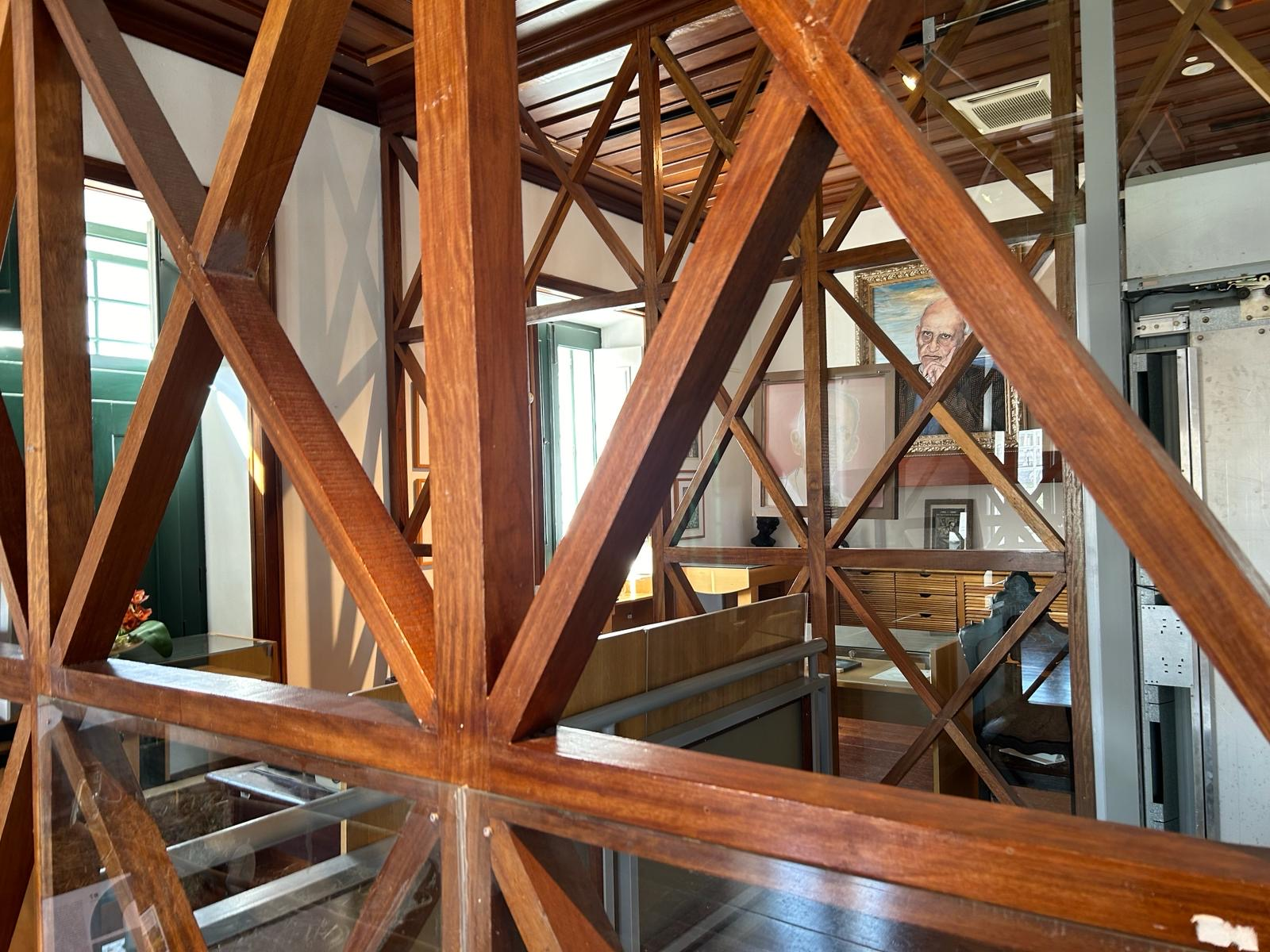
View of Gaiola at Arquivo Histórico Municipal in Vila Real do Santo António, Algarve, Portugal. The original exposed beams are from very hard wood.

== Features ==
Masonry is more effective than wood in resisting fires. Therefore, incorporating a wooden structure in masonry walls combined the advantages of both types of construction. The gaiola pombalina building features a traditional timber flooring and a hybrid timber-masonry shear walls. The walls were constructed using a wooden truss system that was filled with masonry in the empty areas.

The gaiola pombalina system was also adopted by other European cities. There is the case of the palace built according to the concept of gaiola in the town of Filogaso in the Calabria region. It was the only remaining building after the town was completely destroyed by an earthquake in 1783.

== See also ==
- Pombaline style
