= Jengki style =

Indonesian architectural style of the mid-20th century

Wisma Ahmad Yani, an example of Jengki architectural style

Jengki, also known as Yankee style, was a post-war modernist architectural style developed in Indonesia following its independence. The style was popular between late 1950s and early 1960s.

Jengki style reflected the new influence of the United States on Indonesian architecture after hundreds years of the Dutch colonial rule. It can be interpreted as a tropical interpretation of American post-war modernist suburb houses. Johan Silas, a native architect, speculates that this distinctive architecture is an expression of the political spirit of freedom among the Indonesians, which translated into an architecture that differs from what the Dutch had done.

== History ==
=== Early form ===
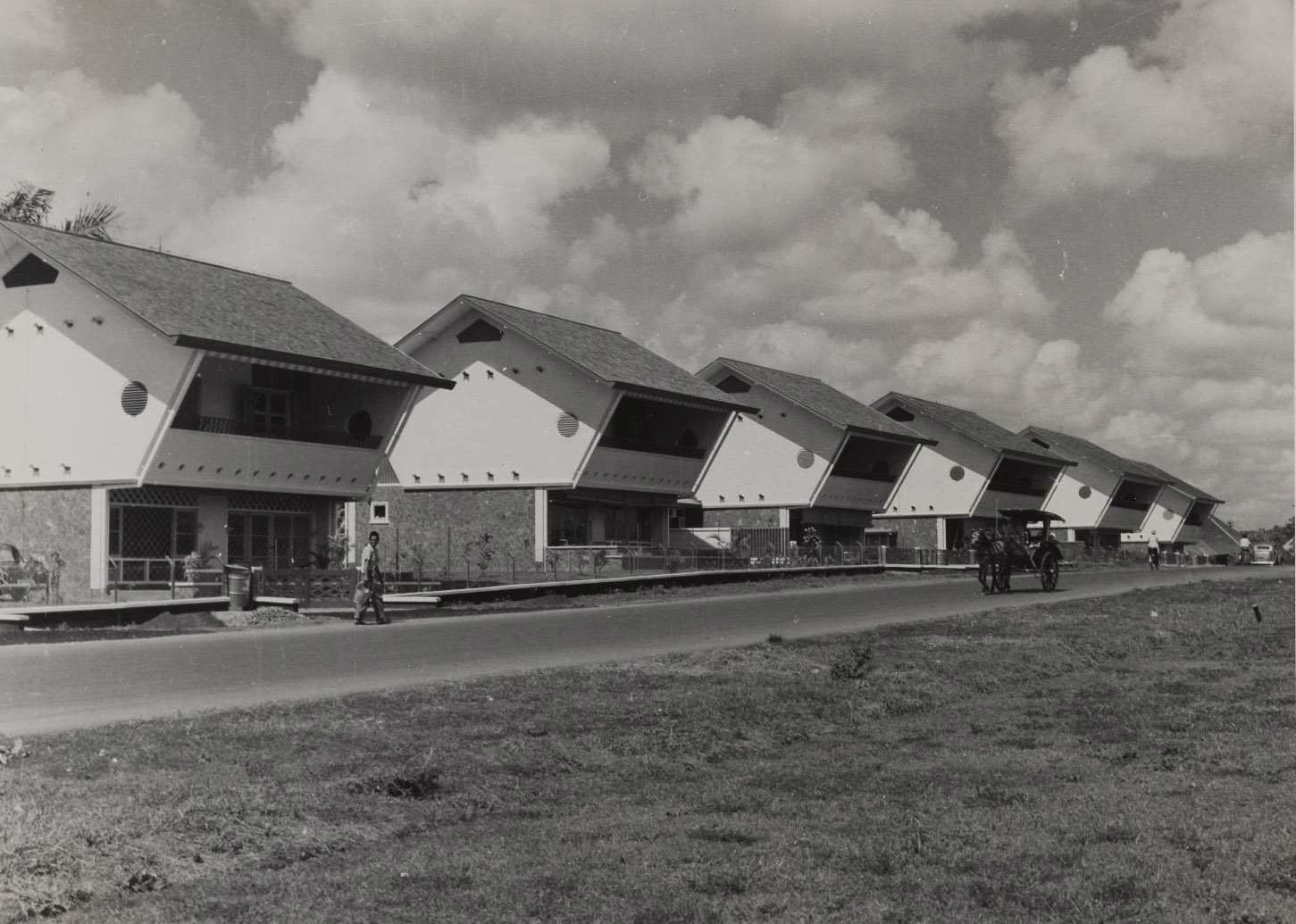
Bataafsche Petroleum Maatschappij staff's housing in Kebayoran Baru.

Jengki style first appeared with the development of the new satellite town of Kebayoran Baru. Designed by Ger Boom Job & Sprey, construction of the area was finished in 1955. These houses, which were made for the staffs of BPM oil company, were known for their bold character and playful angles. For example, middle-class houses in Kebayoran were designed with a square or rectangular layout, but the first floor is tilted forward to protect the facade of the lower level from the sun. Lower-level official houses in Kebayoran make use of the front patio. Similar houses were built in other cities where the BPM operates, e.g. Balikpapan.

=== Development of a new style ===
The style was further developed in the 1950s. Bold use of color is introduced, while playful angles and steep unusual roofs characterized houses of this period. It is also becoming more and more influenced with the American mid-century modern style. At this period, the particular style was known in Indonesia as Yankee-type or Jengki style due to its heavy American influence. It can be interpreted as a tropical interpretation of American mid-century Googie style. Buildings in Jengki style were mostly designed by construction companies or architecture students of Bandung Institute of Technology, where the first Department of Architecture in Indonesia was established in 1951. Initially established under Dutch professors, they had to leave in the mid-1950s during the second wave of repatriation due to political turmoil in newly independent Indonesia. For a short period some German professors managed the department, but by the end of the 1950s it was taken over by Americans and Indonesian graduates from American universities. Consequently, the architecture graduates of ITB are most influenced by American architecture. Among those graduates are Djelantik, Harjono Sigit, Johan Silas and Harry Winarno Kwari. This influence was possibly brought through American teachers working at the Department of Architecture at Bandung Institute of Technology in the mid-1950s.

== Characteristic ==
Essentially, Jengki style rejected the strict cubic geometric forms that the Dutch had used before World War II. Jengki style made use of unusual shapes, such as pentagons, and sharp bold angles. Asymmetrical roofs and facades, playful cut-out doors and windows, and oddly tilted roofs and eaves were imbued with a spirit of cheerfulness and freedom. They were associated with an expression of the political spirit of freedom among the Indonesians. Frances Affandi, the executive director of the Bandung Heritage Society, says that the structures are "... charming and noteworthy, but underresearched, underdocumented and underappreciated.”

== Examples ==
Many Jengki style buildings have been demolished but examples remain across Indonesia, particularly in the capital Jakarta, and in the Javan cities of Bandung, Yogyakarta, Solo and Semarang, as well as outside Java – in Medan, Biak, Makassar and Balikpapan. Below are some list of buildings designed in Jengki style:

Jakarta

- Houses of the staff of BPM, Kebayoran

Bandung

- Gedung BPI (Scientific Research Institute Building)
- Gedung PDAM (Regional Water Utility Company Building)
- Gedung Politeknik Kesehatan (Health and Polytechnic Building).

Surabaya

- Cendrawasih Chocolate Factory (formerly de Ruijter Bread)
- Gate of the Heroes Cemetery
- Residence at Jalan Doktor Soetomo 73
- Residence of Salim Martak

Semarang

- Apotek Sputnik

== See also ==
- List of architectural styles
- Architecture of Indonesia
- New Indies Style

== Cited works ==
- Agus Sachari (2007). Budaya visual Indonesia: membaca makna perkembangan gaya visual karya desain di Indonesia abad ke-20 (in Indonesian). Jakarta: Erlangga. p. 98. ISBN 9789797819491.
- de Vletter, M.E.; Voskuil, R.P.G.A.; van Diessen, J.R.; van Dulm, J. (1999). Batavia/Djakarta/Jakarta - Beeld van een Stad. Purmerend: Asia Maior. ISBN 9074861091.
- Prijotomo, Josef; Adiyanto, Johannes (2004). Arsitektur Nusantara: menuju keniscayaan (in Indonesian). Wastu Lanas Grafika. ISBN 9789793743042.
