= Berlin Style =

German neotraditional architecture style

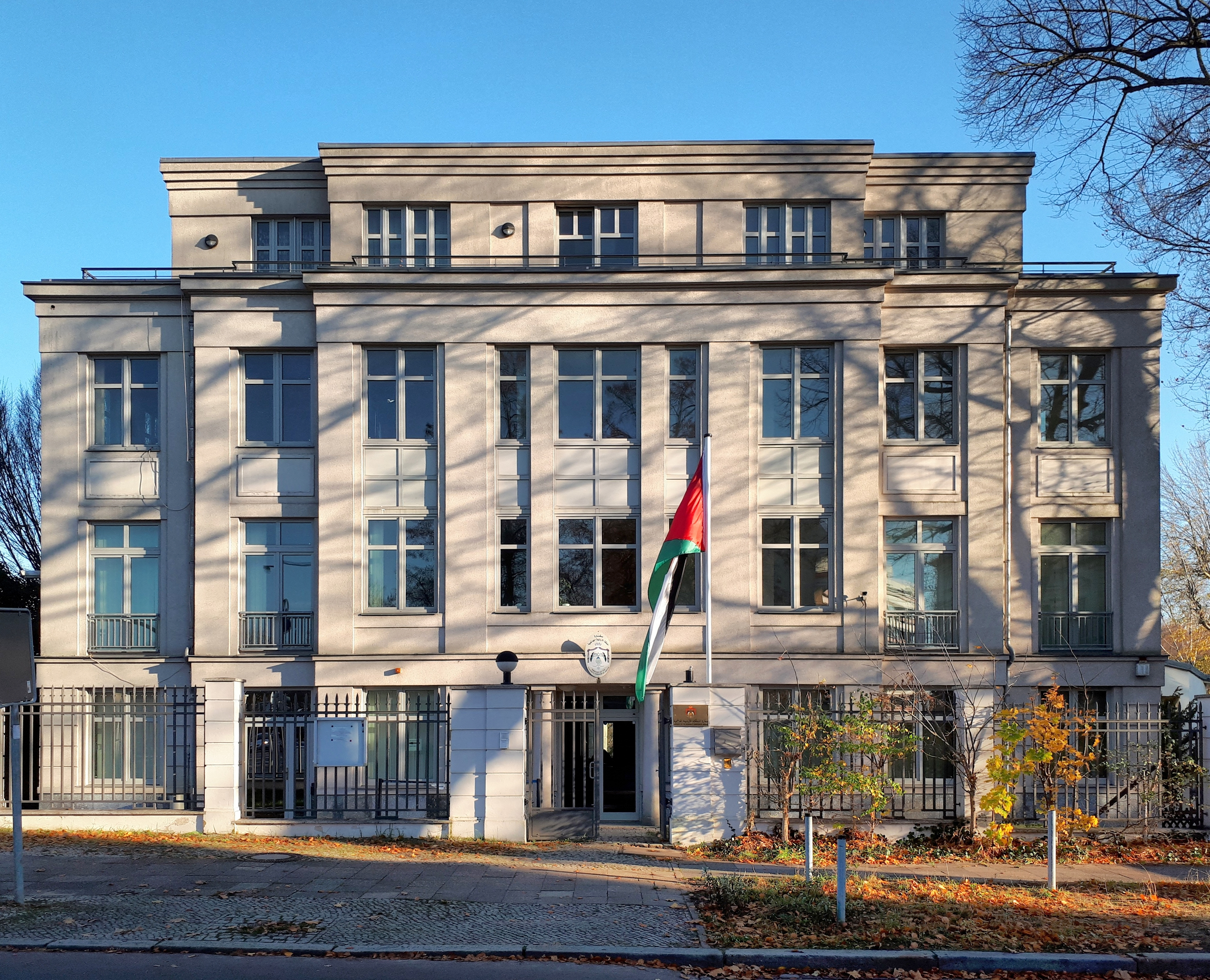
Jordanian Embassy, Berlin, built in 1995

The Berlin Style (also referred to as Berlin Classicism) is a neotraditional style of architecture that has developed in Germany since the fall of the Berlin Wall. It is characterized by streamlined design and sparse decoration, and is influenced both by the classical architecture of Schinkel and the Gründerzeit, as well as early 20th century Modernism and Art Deco.

== History ==
The origins of the style can be found around the time of German reunification in 1990, when a lively and highly ideological discourse on architectural heritage began to take place in the country. The reconstruction of Hotel Adlon (1995–1997) in central Berlin using a traditional design language caused great controversy and became the target of heavy criticism from many in the architectural profession. Nonetheless, the hotel was an important early work of neotraditional architecture in Germany, and would be followed by many similar buildings. This turn towards classical architecture was connected to the international movement of New Urbanism, but unlike their counterparts in the United Kingdom and the United States, German neotraditional architects tended to be more eclectic, taking inspiration from various historical styles, notably the early 19th century Neoclassical architecture of Schinkel, as well as Gründerzeit architecture and early Modernism and Art Deco. Although the style mainly originated in Berlin, it can now be found all across Germany, and some firms have even worked in other countries such as India and Paraguay.
