= Timeline of architectural styles =

This timeline shows the periods of various architectural styles in a graphical fashion.

== 6000 BC–present ==
- 8000 years – the last 1000 years (fine grid) is expanded in the timeline below

== See also ==
- Timeline of architecture
- List of architectural styles
