= 2005 Lisbon local election =

2005 Lisbon local elections
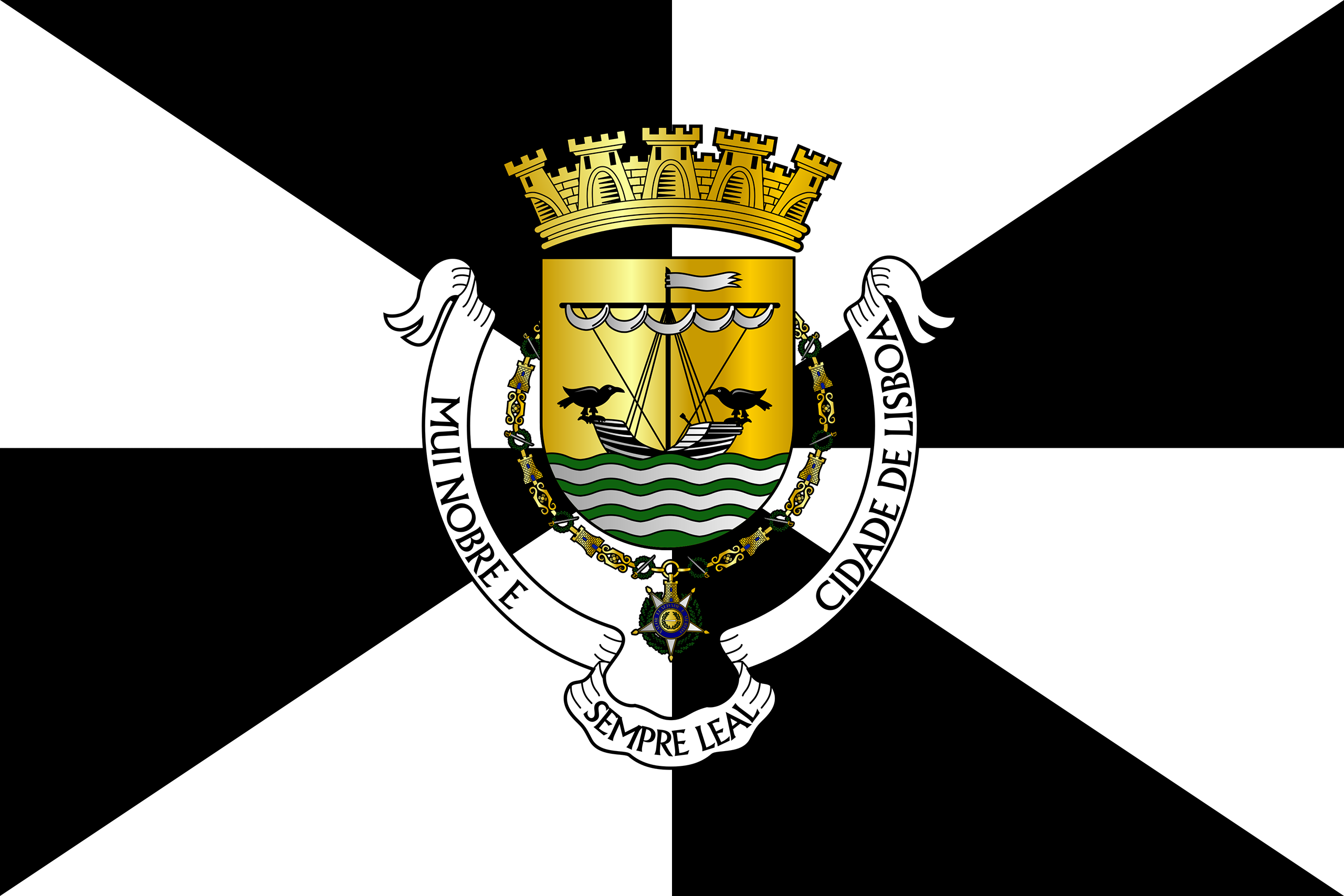
- 9 October 2005

All 17 Councillors in the Lisbon City Council 9 seats needed for a majority
- Opinion polls
- Turnout: 52.7% ▼2.4 pp
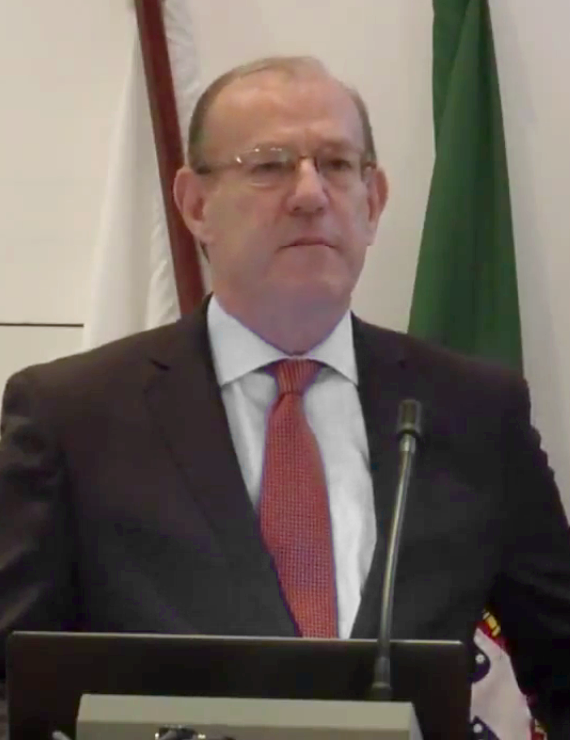

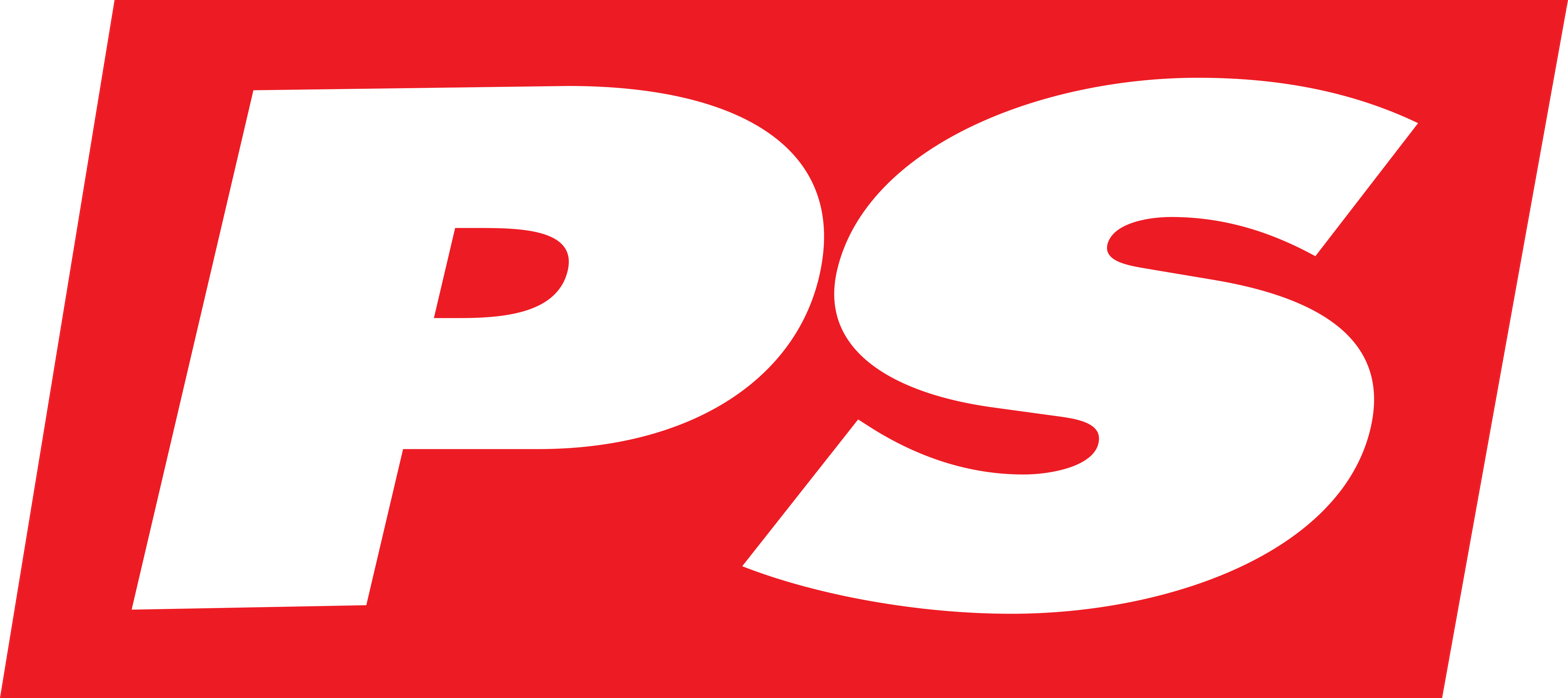

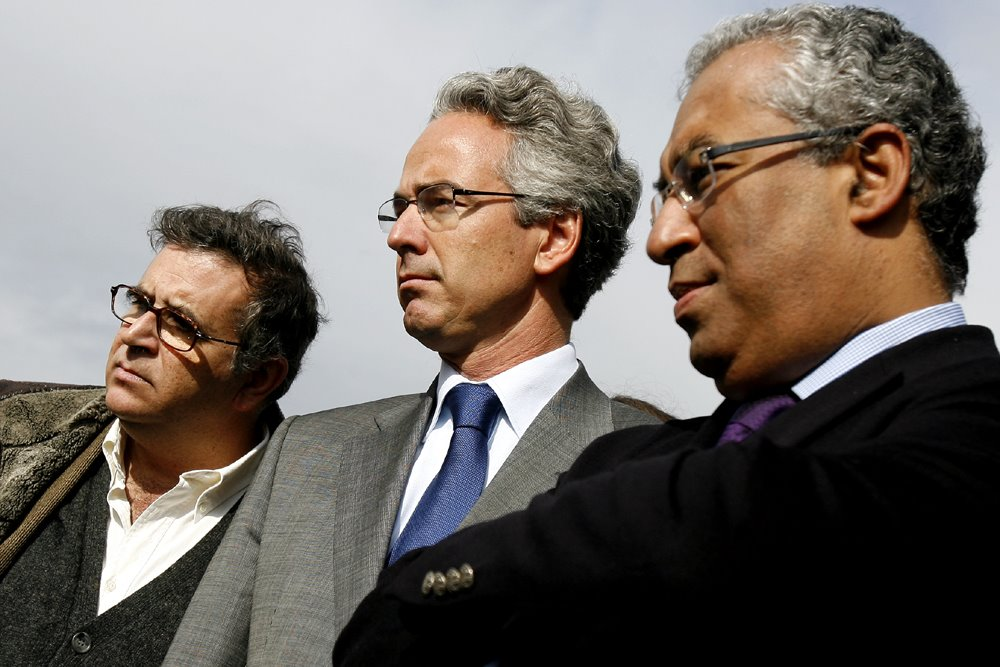

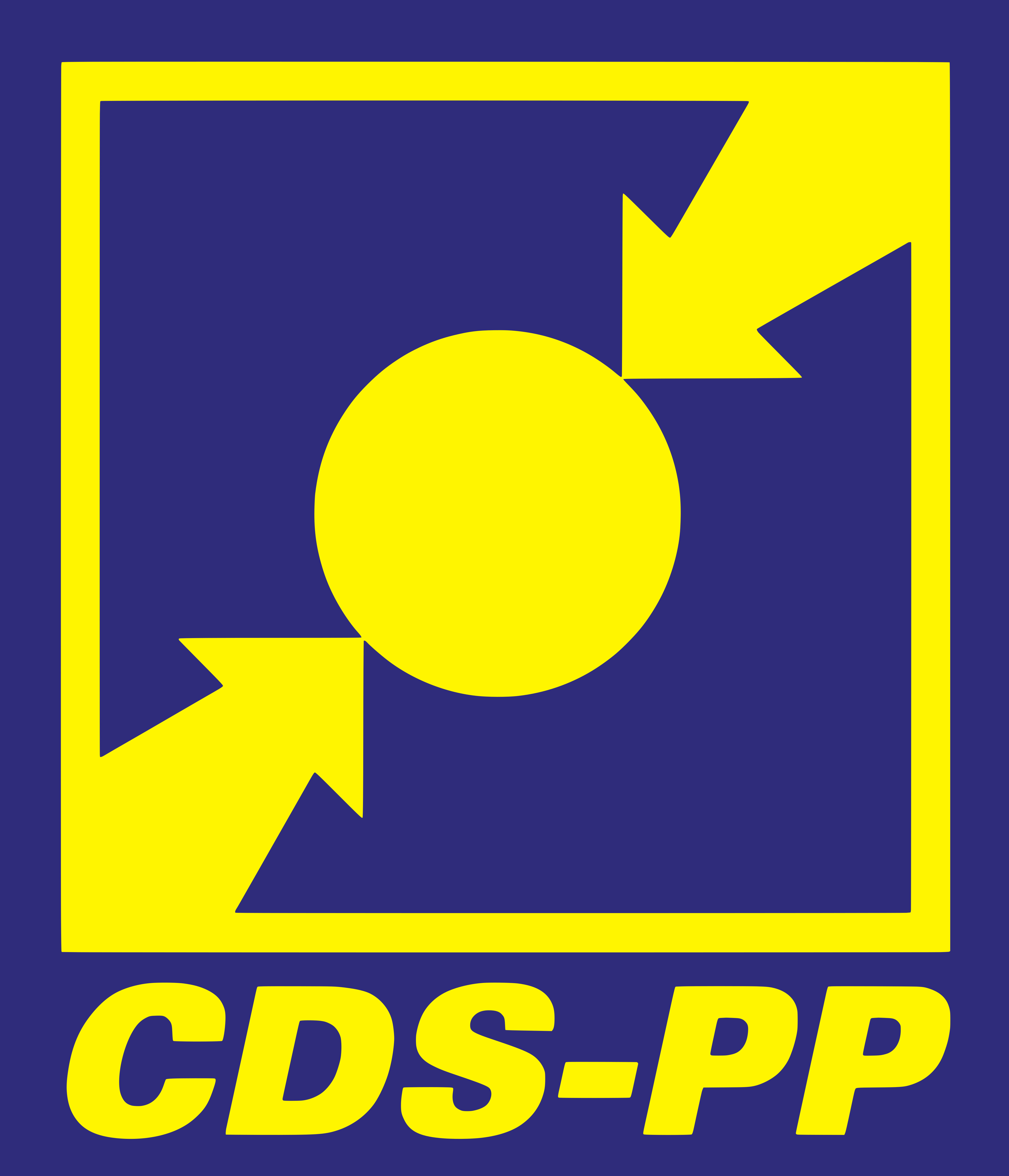
	First party	Second party	Third party
Leader	Carmona Rodrigues	Manuel Maria Carrilho	Ruben de Carvalho
Party	PSD	PS	PCP
Alliance			CDU
Last election	8 seats, 42.0%	4 seats (AL)	4 seats (AL)
Seats won	8	5	2
Seat change	Steady	▲1	▼2
Popular vote	119,837	75,022	32,254
Percentage	42.4%	26.6%	11.4%
Swing	▲0.4 pp	N/A	N/A
	Fourth party	Fifth party
Leader	José Sá Fernandes	Maria José Nogueira Pinto
Party	BE	CDS–PP
Last election	0 seats, 3.8%	1 seat, 7.6%
Seats won	1	1
Seat change	▲1	Steady
Popular vote	22,342	16,723
Percentage	7.9%	5.9%
Swing	▲4.1 pp	▼1.6 pp
Mayor before election
Pedro Santana Lopes
PSD
Elected Mayor
Carmona Rodrigues
PSD

The 2005 Lisbon local election was held on 9 October 2005 to elect the members of the Lisbon City Council.

Carmona Rodrigues, who was mayor during Santana Lopes' short period as prime minister from 2004 to 2005, was elected for a full term with 42% of the votes, defeating Manuel Maria Carrilho, from the Socialist Party, who achieved only about 27% of the votes.

The Unitary Democratic Coalition ran alone this time, presenting Ruben de Carvalho and achieving 11% of the votes, which guaranteed two Communist councilors. The Left Bloc, with José Sá Fernandes as the candidate for Mayor, managed to gain a councillor seat for the first time. The CDS – People's Party, with Maria José Nogueira Pinto, managed to keep its councillor, despite losing some votes.

== Background ==
In the 2001 election, the Social Democratic Party (PSD) led by Pedro Santana Lopes, defeated incumbent Mayor João Soares, supported by the coalition between the Socialist Party (PS) and the Communist Party (PCP), by a margin of about 0.3%.

In 2004, after Durão Barroso resigned as prime minister to assume the office of President of the European Commission, Pedro Santana Lopes was chosen as prime minister, being replaced as mayor by Carmona Rodrigues. He assumed the office until Santana Lopes' defeat in the 2005 legislative election, after which Santana Lopes regained his office as Mayor of Lisbon.

=== Candidate selection ===
The PS, looking to take back the city after four years of Social Democratic control, tried to recruit a candidate. In 2004, that choice was expected to fall on José Sócrates, former Minister of the Environment, but, after the resignation of Eduardo Ferro Rodrigues as Secretary-general of PS, Sócrates announced his candidacy and won the leadership of the party, going on to win the 2005 legislative election a few months later. After a brief speculation that Ferro Rodrigues could be the candidate, the choice eventually fell on Manuel Maria Carrilho, the former Minister of Culture, who announced his candidacy on March 2005.

On the side of the PSD, after the return of Santana Lopes as Mayor, he intended to seek reelection. This candidacy was, however, vetoed by the new party president, Luís Marques Mendes, who preferred Carmona Rodrigues as the mayoral candidate, with him being selected as candidate in April 2005.

The decision about the continuation of the PS/PCP coalition was on the table, with the PCP, with Ruben de Carvalho as their candidate, seeking to keep the coalition with the same distribution of seats that had been in place since the 1989 local election, while the PS defended that the distribution should be based on the results of the latest legislative election, while also vetoing the entrance of the Ecologist Party "The Greens", the junior partner of the Unitary Democratic Coalition, in a coalition. As such, the negotiations failed, and each party ran their own candidacy.

== Electoral system ==
Each party or coalition must present a list of candidates. The winner of the most voted list for the municipal council is automatically elected mayor, similar to first-past-the-post (FPTP). The lists are closed and the seats in each municipality are apportioned according to the D'Hondt method. Unlike in national legislative elections, independent lists are allowed to run.

== Parties and candidates ==
Party/Coalition		Political position	Candidate	2001 result	
Party/Coalition		Political position	Candidate	Votes (%)	Seats
PSD	Social Democratic Party; Partido Social Democrata	Centre-right	Carmona Rodrigues	42.0%	8 / 17
PS	Socialist Party; Partido Socialista	Centre-left	Manuel Maria Carrilho	41.7%	4 / 17
CDU	Unitary Democratic Coalition; Coligação Democrática Unitária PCP, PEV	Left-wing to far-left	Ruben de Carvalho	41.7%	4 / 17
CDS–PP	CDS – People's Party; CDS – Partido Popular	Right-wing	Maria José Nogueira Pinto	7.6%	1 / 17
BE	Left Bloc; Bloco de Esquerda	Left-wing to far-left	José Sá Fernandes	3.8%	0 / 17
PCTP	Portuguese Workers' Communist Party; Partido Comunista dos Trabalhadores Portugueses	Far-left	Carlos Paisana	0.8%	0 / 17
PH	Humanist Party; Partido Humanista	Centre-left	Pedro Cruz Braga	0.4%	0 / 17
PNR	National Renovator Party; Partido Nacional Renovador	Far-right	José Pinto Coelho	0.2%	0 / 17

== Opinion polling ==
Exit poll

Polling firm/Link	Fieldwork date	Sample size	PSD	PS	CDU	CDS	BE	O	Lead
2005 local election	9 Oct 2005	—N/a	42.4; 8	26.6; 5	11.4; 2	5.9; 1	7.9; 1	5.8; 0	15.8
UCP	9 Oct 2005	?	40–44	26–30	10–13	5–7	8–10	–	14
Eurosondagem	2–5 Oct 2005	1,569	41.4	30.5	10.1	5.5	8.5	4.0	10.9
Intercampus	1–5 Oct 2005	1,001	34.3	34.7	12.0	4.9	6.9	7.2	0.4
Aximage	3–4 Oct 2005	500	38.5	30.2	8.0	5.6	7.7	10.0	8.3
UCP	1–2 Oct 2005	2,410	36	31	10	7	10	6	5
Marktest	1 Oct 2005	503	38.2	27.7	9.2	8.0	9.2	8.3	10.5
Aximage	24–27 Sep 2005	500	39.9	25.7	6.8	4.4	5.7	17.5	14.2
UCP	7–11 Jul 2005	989	36	41	6	3	8	5	5
Eurosondagem	20–22 Jun 2005	1,525	36.4	29.6	7.8	4.1	7.5	14.6	6.8
Aximage	22–23 Mar 2005	600	47.2	46.6	—N/a	—N/a	—N/a	6.2	0.6
Eurosondagem	15–16 Mar 2005	1,048	41	44	—N/a	—N/a	—N/a	15	3
2005 legislative election	20 Feb 2005	—N/a	24.8 (5)	42.5 (8)	8.2 (1)	10.5 (2)	8.7 (1)	5.3 (0)	17.7
2004 EP election	13 Jun 2004	—N/a	33.4 (6)	41.2 (8)	9.6 (2)		8.5 (1)	7.3 (0)	7.8
2002 legislative election	17 Mar 2002	—N/a	38.0 (7)	37.6 (7)	7.1 (1)	8.8 (1)	5.1 (1)	3.4 (0)	0.4
2001 local election	16 Dec 2001	—N/a	42.0; 8	41.7; 8		7.6; 1	3.8; 0	5.0; 0	0.3

== Results ==
=== Municipal Council ===
Summary of the 9 October 2005 Lisbon City Council election results
Graph of the party split among 17 seats.
Parties	Votes	%	±pp swing	Councillors	
Parties	Votes	%	±pp swing	Total	±
Social Democratic	119,837	42.43	▲0.5	8	0
Socialist	75,022	26.56	—N/a	5	▲1
Unitary Democratic Coalition	32,254	11.42	—N/a	2	▼2
Left Bloc	22,342	7.91	▲4.1	1	▲1
People's	16,723	5.92	▼1.6	1	0
Portuguese Workers' Communist	2,689	0.95	▲0.2	0	0
National Renovator	798	0.28	▲0.1	0	0
Humanist	507	0.18	▼0.0	0	0
Total valid	270,172	95.65	▼1.2	17	0
Blank ballots	7,538	2.67	▲0.8		
Invalid ballots	4,733	1.68	▲0.5		
Total	282,443	100.00			
Registered voters/turnout	536,450	52.65	▼2.4		
Source: Lisbon 2005 election results

=== Municipal Assembly ===
Summary of the 9 October 2005 Lisbon City Council election results
Graph of the party split among 54 seats.
Parties	Votes	%	±pp swing	Seats	
Parties	Votes	%	±pp swing	Total	±
Social Democratic	107,917	38.21	▲1.6	23	0
Socialist	77,789	27.54	—N/a	16	—N/a
Unitary Democratic Coalition	36,569	12.95	—N/a	7	—N/a
Left Bloc	26,434	9.36	▲4.5	5	▲3
People's	17,700	6.27	▼2.4	3	▼2
Portuguese Workers' Communist	3,613	1.28	▲0.2	0	0
Total valid	270,022	95.61	▼1.2	54	0
Blank ballots	7,735	2.74	▲0.6		
Invalid ballots	4,676	1.66	▲0.5		
Total	282,433	100.00			
Registered voters/turnout	536,450	52.65	▼2.4		
Source: Lisbon 2005 election results

=== Parish Assemblies ===
Results of the 9 October 2005 Lisbon Parish Assembly elections
Parish	%	S	%	S	%	S	%	S	%	S	%	S	Total S
Parish	PSD		PS		CDU		BE		CDS–PP		IND		Total S
Ajuda	22.0	3	30.5	4	50.3	5	7.1	1	2.7	-			13
Alcântara	27.7	4	24.6	3	31.1	5	7.7	1	4.0	-			13
Alto do Pina	47.9	7	24.7	3	8.9	1	7.6	1	6.9	1			13
Alvalade	50.1	7	20.4	3	7.8	1	7.3	1	10.4	1			13
Ameixoeira	30.3	4	29.1	4	24.9	4	7.3	1	3.8	-			13
Anjos	38.6	6	26.7	4	12.2	1	8.5	1	8.6	1			13
Beato	25.8	4	31.7	5	23.1	3	8.0	1	4.0	-			13
Benfica	37.7	8	32.4	7	12.9	3	8.3	1	4.0	-			19
Campo Grande	42.4	6	26.9	4	12.3	1	7.1	1	7.3	1			13
Campolide	33.4	5	30.2	4	16.5	3	9.0	1	6.5	-			13
Carnide	25.5	4	24.2	3	35.4	5	6.2	1	4.3	-			13
Castelo	7.9	-	17.3	1	59.9	5	10.3	1	1.5	-			7
Charneca	23.8	3	36.4	5	25.0	4	6.3	1	3.6	-			13
Coração de Jesus	40.3	6	25.7	4	10.1	1	10.6	1	8.0	1			13
Encarnação	28.6	3	30.2	3	14.4	1	8.1	1	3.6	-	10.6	1	9
Graça	36.0	5	31.4	5	15.3	2	9.8	1	2.8	-			13
Lapa	45.4	6	21.1	3	7.6	1	7.2	1	15.0	2			13
Lumiar	42.9	9	27.2	6	10.8	2	8.2	1	6.3	1			19
Madalena	22.2	2	25.1	2	35.0	3	9.4	-	5.4	-			7
Mártires	38.4	3	35.5	3	6.4	-	5.9	-	9.9	1			7
Marvila	22.6	5	33.2	7	25.0	6	6.8	1	2.6	-			19
Mercês	29.5	3	33.8	4	15.9	1	9.5	1	6.4	-			9
Nossa Senhora de Fátima	46.6	7	23.5	3	8.8	1	7.4	1	9.7	1			13
Pena	30.2	5	29.4	4	21.3	3	8.9	1	4.9	-			13
Penha de França	37.1	6	32.4	5	12.2	1	9.4	1	3.6	-			13
Prazeres	32.7	4	28.5	4	21.0	3	7.0	1	7.3	1			13
Sacramento	43.2	3	23.6	2	12.6	1	10.9	1	5.3	-			7
Santa Catarina	27.5	3	39.0	4	14.1	1	10.1	1	5.1	-			9
Santa Engrácia	35.9	5	29.7	4	19.3	3	6.3	1	3.6	-			13
Santa Isabel	44.9	7	23.3	3	11.7	1	7.5	1	8.5	1			13
Santa Justa	26.2	2	35.6	3	22.2	2	6.1	-	5.5	-			7
Santa Maria de Belém	43.8	7	26.3	4	10.6	1	7.5	1	7.8	1			13
Santa Maria dos Olivais	31.1	7	35.9	9	14.1	3	8.3	2	3.8	-			21
Santiago	22.1	2	28.8	2	36.3	3	6.3	-	3.7	-			7
Santo Condestável	32.9	5	24.9	4	24.2	3	8.3	1	5.1	-			13
Santo Estêvão	14.6	1	29.3	3	32.9	4			2.3	-	15.6	1	9
Santos-o-Velho	31.7	3	34.2	4	16.2	1	6.6	-	8.3	1			9
São Cristóvão e São Lourenço	30.9	3	38.3	4	14.2	1	8.6	1	3.7	-			9
São Domingos de Benfica	43.8	10	26.0	5	11.1	2	8.0	1	6.6	1			19
São Francisco Xavier	49.2	7	20.4	3	7.4	1	6.2	-	12.7	2			13
São João	31.2	5	29.1	4	22.9	3	7.9	1	4.2	-			13
São João de Brito	50.7	7	20.6	3	8.4	1	6.6	1	9.5	1			13
São João de Deus	49.9	7	20.7	3	7.1	1	6.9	1	10.8	1			13
São Jorge de Arroios	41.8	6	24.3	3	13.9	2	8.4	1	7.1	1			13
São José	32.3	3	30.4	3	16.3	2	10.2	1	5.5	-			9
São Mamede	45.1	6	26.1	4	7.0	1	7.2	1	10.7	1			13
São Miguel	19.4	2	37.5	4	33.7	3	4.3	-	1.9	-			9
São Nicolau	41.2	4	29.7	3	8.8	1	9.6	1	5.5	-			9
São Paulo	31.4	3	35.9	4	15.3	1	8.5	1	4.3	-			9
São Sebastião da Pedreira	48.4	7	18.8	2	6.4	1	7.7	1	15.5	2			13
Santo Vicente de Fora	22.1	2	28.9	3	32.3	4	7.5	-	4.4	-			9
Sé	36.9	4	36.0	4	11.3	1	6.6	-	4.0	-			9
Socorro	37.3	4	34.6	4	11.9	1	7.1	-	4.2	-			9
Total	36.3	250	28.3	201	16.3	115	7.8	44	6.1	23	0.1	2	635
Source: Election Results
