= 2009 Lisbon local election =

2009 Lisbon local elections
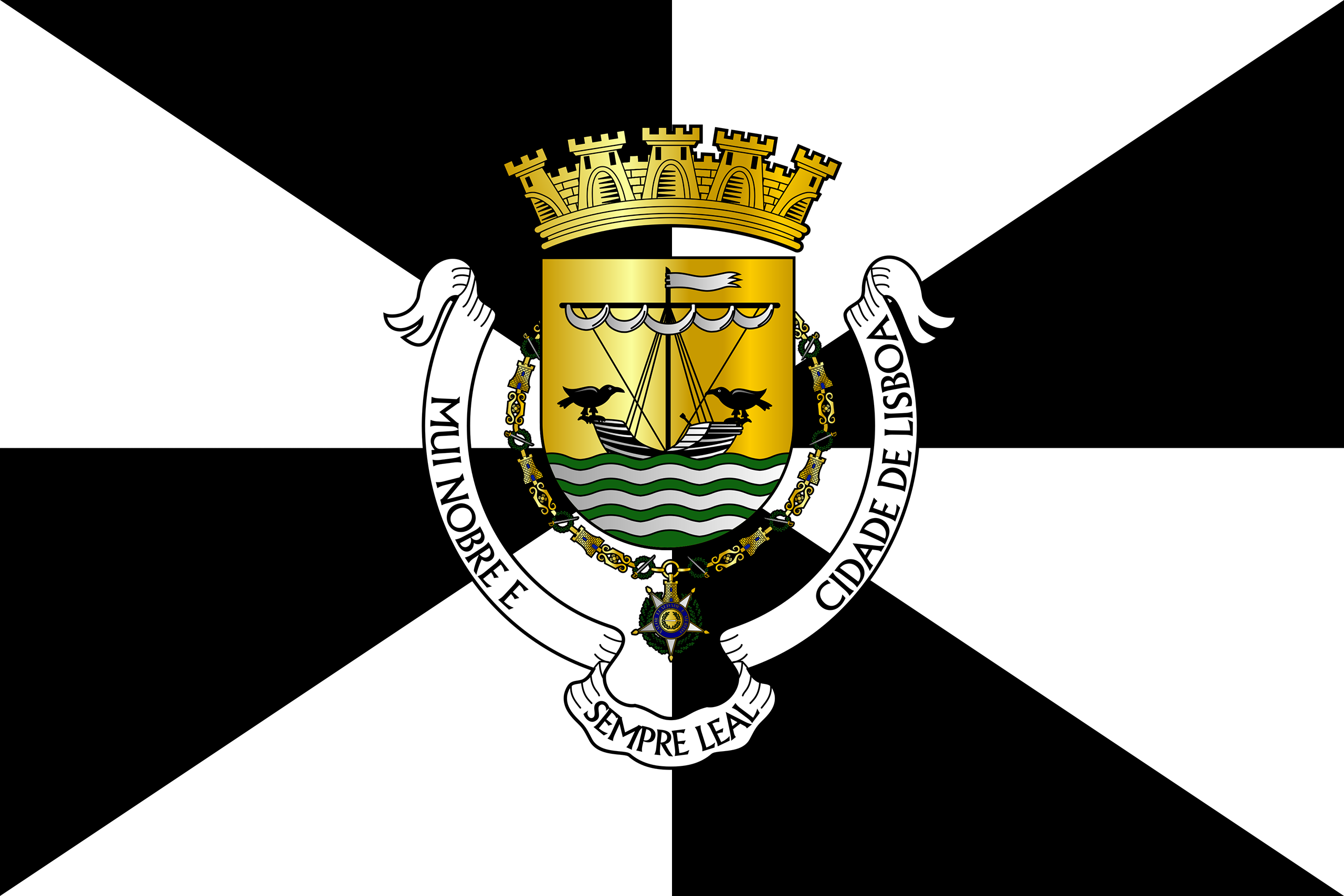
- 11 October 2009

All 17 Councillors in the Lisbon City Council 9 seats needed for a majority
- Opinion polls
- Turnout: 53.4% ▲16.7 pp
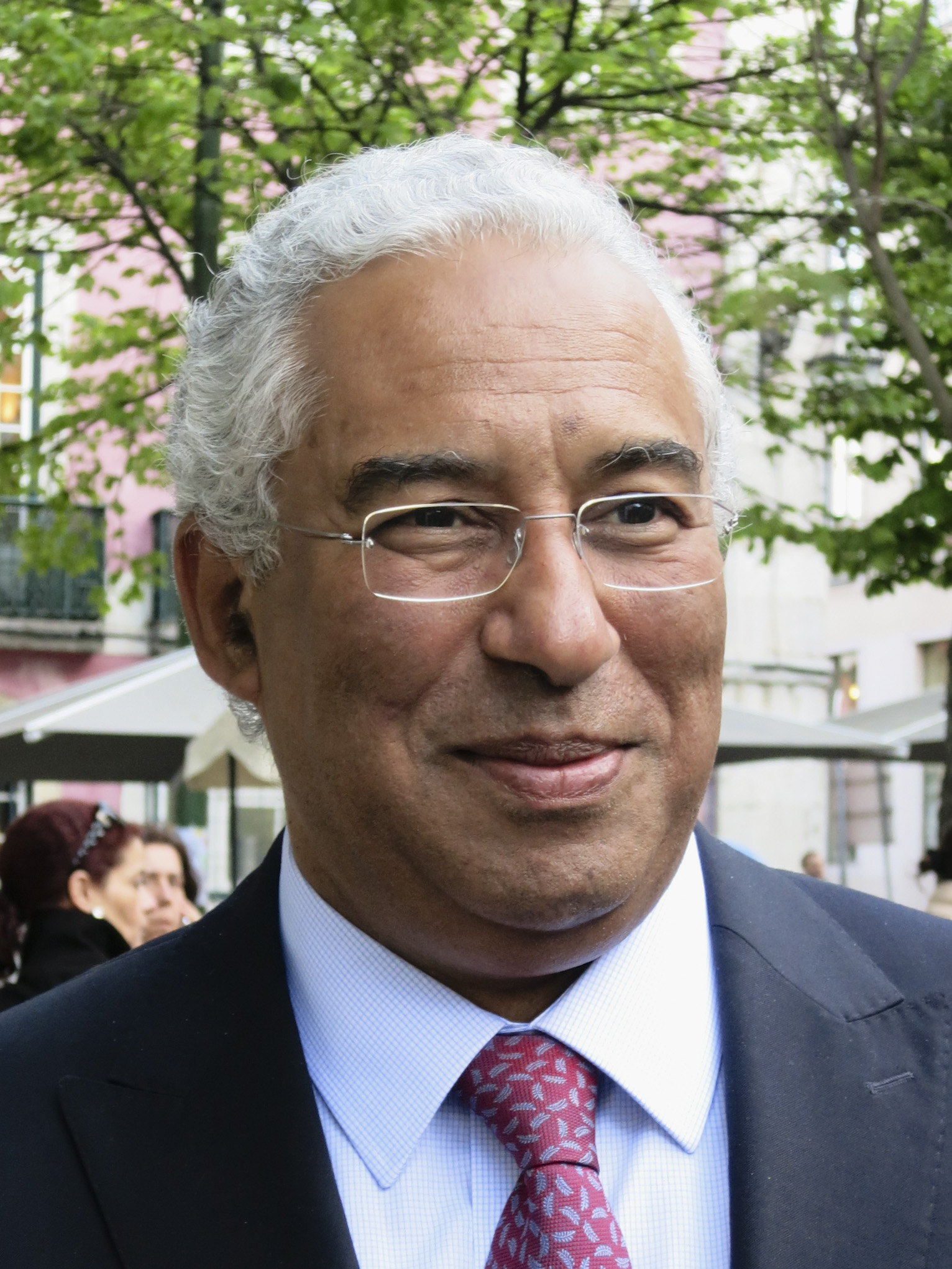

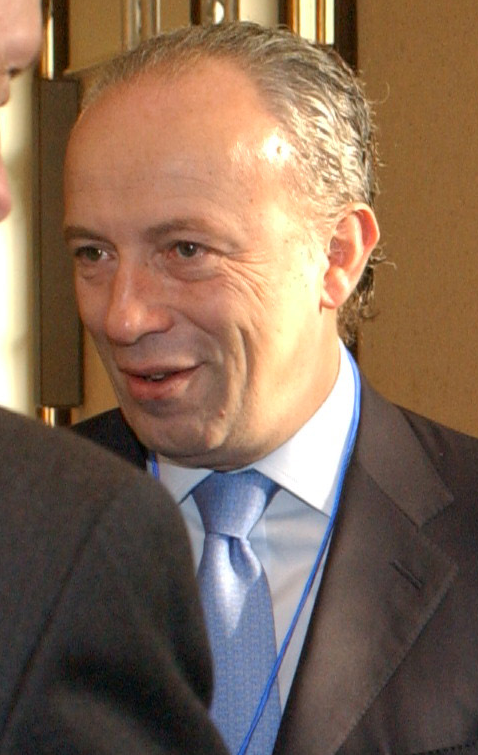

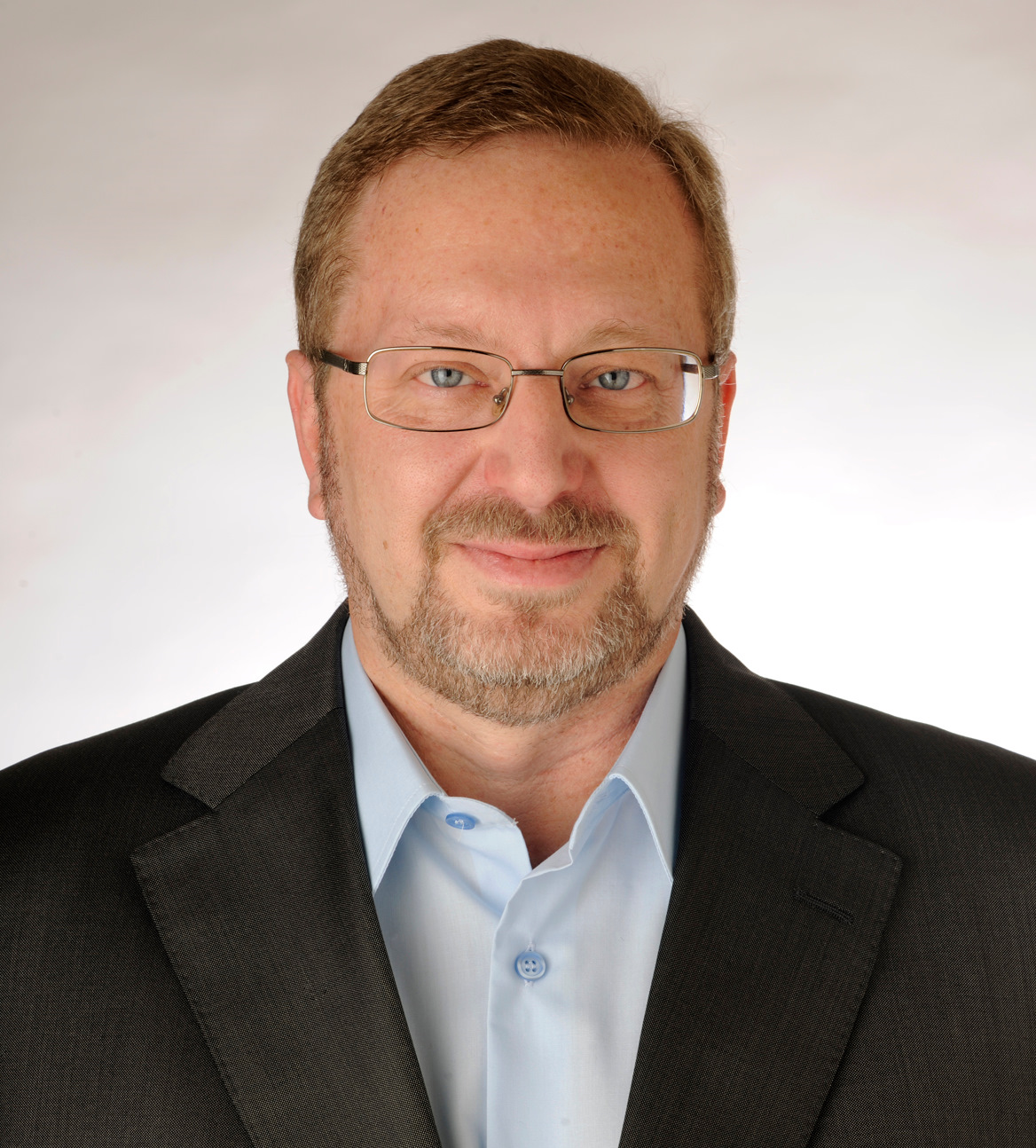
	First party	Second party
Leader	António Costa	Pedro Santana Lopes
Party	PS	PSD
Alliance		Lisbon with Way (Note: Coalition with PSD, CDS–PP, MPT and PPM and the sum of the parties results in 2007.)
Last election	8 seats, 39.8% (Note: Sum of PS and Citizens for Lisbon 2007 results.)	3 seats, 20.4%
Seats won	9	7
Seat change	▲1	▲4
Popular vote	123,372	108,457
Percentage	44.0%	38.7%
Swing	▲4.2 pp	▲18.3 pp
	Third party	Fourth party
Leader	Ruben de Carvalho	Luís Fazenda
Party	PCP	BE
Alliance	CDU
Last election	2 seats, 9.4%	1 seats, 6.8%
Seats won	1	0
Seat change	▼1	▼1
Popular vote	22,623	12,795
Percentage	8.1%	4.6%
Swing	▼1.3 pp	▼2.2 pp
Mayor before election
António Costa
PS
Elected Mayor
António Costa
PS

The 2009 Lisbon local election was held on 11 October 2009 to elect the members of the Lisbon City Council.

Mayor since 2007, António Costa, was able to win a full term as mayor with 44 percent of the votes and achieving an absolute majority. In this election, he joined forces with Helena Roseta's Citizen for Lisbon movement. He defeated former Lisbon mayor and Prime Minister Pedro Santana Lopes, which gathered almost 39 percent of the votes and elected 7 councillors.

The Unitary Democratic Coalition presented, just like in 2007, Ruben de Carvalho as their mayoral candidate, but lost support compared with 2007, winning 8 percent of the votes and losing one councillor. The Left Bloc, presented Luís Fazenda as a candidate for Mayor, but failed to hold on to their council seat.

Turnout grew considerably compared with the 2007 by-election, with just 53.4 percent of voters casting a ballot on election day.

== Background ==
The 2007 by-election was called after former mayor Carmona Rodrigues government fell, following a controversial urban development plan regarding a company called Bragaparques, that ended up being investigated by the Public Prosecution Office. The PSD withdrew their support from Carmona and a by-election was shortly called. In a very fragmented result, António Costa, PS candidate, was elected mayor with just 29.5 percent of the votes.

== Electoral system ==
Each party or coalition must present a list of candidates. The winner of the most voted list for the municipal council is automatically elected mayor, similar to first-past-the-post (FPTP). The lists are closed and the seats in each municipality are apportioned according to the D'Hondt method. Unlike in national legislative elections, independent lists are allowed to run.

== Parties and candidates ==
Party/Coalition		Political position	Candidate	2007 result	
Party/Coalition		Political position	Candidate	Votes (%)	Seats
PS	Socialist Party; Partido Socialista	Centre-left	António Costa	39.8%	8 / 17
LCS	Lisbon with Way; Lisboa com Sentido PPD/PSD, CDS–PP, MPT, PPM	Centre-right	Pedro Santana Lopes	20.5%	3 / 17
CDU	Unitary Democratic Coalition; Coligação Democrática Unitária PCP, PEV	Left-wing to far-left	Ruben de Carvalho	9.4%	2 / 17
BE	Left Bloc; Bloco de Esquerda	Left-wing to far-left	Luís Fazenda	6.8%	1 / 17
PCTP	Portuguese Workers' Communist Party; Partido Comunista dos Trabalhadores Portugueses	Far-left	Carlos Paisana	1.6%	0 / 17
PNR	National Renovator Party; Partido Nacional Renovador	Far-right	José Pinto Coelho	0.8%	0 / 17
MEP	Hope for Portugal Movement; Movimento Esperança por Portugal	Centre-right	José Ramos	—N/a	—N/a
MMS	Merit and Society Movement; Movimento Mérito e Sociedade	Centre-right	António Coelho da Costa	—N/a	—N/a
PTP	Portuguese Labour Party; Partido Trabalhista Português	Centre-left	Bruno de Sousa	—N/a	—N/a

== Opinion polling ==
Exit poll

Polling firm/Link	Fieldwork date	Sample size	PS	PSD CDS MPT PPM	CDU	BE	O	Lead
2009 local election	11 Oct 2009	—N/a	44.0; 9	38.7; 7	8.1; 1	4.6; 0	4.6; 0	5.3
UCP–CESOP	11 Oct 2009	?	44– 48; 8/9	34– 38; 6/7	8.5– 10.5; 1/2	3– 5; 0/1	–	10
Eurosondagem	11 Oct 2009	?	41.2– 45.4	36.9– 41.1	6.6– 8.8	3.9– 6.1	–	4.3
Intercampus	11 Oct 2009	?	42.8– 48.4	34.7– 40.3	7.1– 10.7	3.0– 5.6	–	8.1
Aximage	6–8 Oct 2009	802	44.4	38.4	6.4	6.0	4.8	6.0
Marktest	5–7 Oct 2009	510	45.0	37.9	7.3	5.4	4.4	7.1
UCP–CESOP	3–6 Oct 2009	2,221	45	33	9	8	5	12
Eurosondagem	1–6 Oct 2009	1,022	41.9	36.9	8.4	8.0	4.8	5.0
Intercampus	28–30 Sep 2009	800	41.4	33.1	10.4	8.3	6.8	8.3
2009 legislative election	27 Sep 2009	—N/a	34.8 (7)	40.9 (8)	8.6 (1)	9.8 (1)	5.9 (0)	6.1
Marktest	31 Aug–2 Sep 2009	500	43.8	32.7	7.0	9.2	7.3	8.3
UCP–CESOP	28 Jun–4 Jul 2009	716	38	37	7	9	9	1
2009 EP election	7 Jun 2009	—N/a	25.6 (5)	39.8 (8)	10.8 (2)	12.4 (2)	11.4 (0)	14.2
2007 by-election	15 Jul 2007	—N/a	39.8; 8	20.5; 3	9.5; 2	6.8; 1	23.4; 3	19.3

== Results ==
=== Municipal Council ===
Summary of the 11 October 2009 Lisbon City Council elections results
Graph of the party split among 17 seats.
Parties	Votes	%	±pp swing	Councillors	
Parties	Votes	%	±pp swing	Total	±
Socialist	123,372	44.01	▲4.2	9	▲1
PSD / CDS–PP / MPT / PPM	108,457	38.69	▲18.3	7	▲4
Unitary Democratic Coalition	22,623	8.07	▼1.3	1	▼1
Left Bloc	12,795	4.56	▼2.2	0	▼1
Hope for Portugal Movement	1,975	0.70	—N/a	0	—N/a
Portuguese Workers' Communist	1,866	0.67	▼0.9	0	0
National Renovator	917	0.33	▼0.5	0	0
Merit and Society Movement	638	0.23	—N/a	0	—N/a
Labour	515	0.18	—N/a	0	—N/a
Total valid	273,158	97.45	▲1.3	17	0
Blank ballots	4,267	1.52	▼0.9		
Invalid ballots	2,885	1.03	▼0.5		
Total	280,310	100.00			
Registered voters/turnout	524,642	53.43	▲16.7		
Source: Lisbon 2009 election results

=== Municipal Assembly ===
Summary of the 11 October 2009 Lisbon City Council elections results
Graph of the party split among 54 seats.
Parties	Votes	%	±pp swing	Seats	
Parties	Votes	%	±pp swing	Total	±
Socialist	110,243	39.35	▲11.8	23	▲7
PSD / CDS–PP / MPT / PPM	108,636	38.78	▼5.7	23	▼3
Unitary Democratic Coalition	28,025	10.00	▼2.9	5	▼2
Left Bloc	18,857	6.73	▼2.7	3	▼2
Hope for Portugal Movement	2,807	1.00	—N/a	0	—N/a
Portuguese Workers' Communist	2,447	0.87	▼0.9	0	0
National Renovator	1,204	0.43	▼0.5	0	0
Labour	598	0.21	—N/a	0	—N/a
Total valid	272,817	97.37	▲1.8	54	0
Blank ballots	4,468	1.59	▼0.9		
Invalid ballots	2,851	1.02	▲0.7		
Total	280,136	100.00			
Registered voters/turnout	524,642	53.40	▼0.7		
Source: Lisbon 2009 election results

=== Parish Assemblies ===
Results of the 11 October 2009 Lisbon Parish Assembly elections
Parish	%	S	%	S	%	S	%	S	%	S	Total S
Parish	LCS		PS		CDU		BE		IND		Total S
Ajuda	23.8	3	35.6	5	31.6	4	6.4	1			13
Alcântara	30.8	4	29.2	4	29.8	4	7.4	1			13
Alto do Pina	50.4	7	32.8	5	7.9	1	5.4	-			13
Alvalade	54.7	8	30.2	4	6.9	1	5.2	-			13
Ameixoeira	35.2	5	34.3	5	21.4	3	5.4	-			13
Anjos	43.6	6	34.7	5	10.1	3	7.5	1			13
Beato	22.6	3	56.6	9	11.3	1	5.8	-			13
Benfica	38.3	8	39.9	8	11.3	2	7.0	1			19
Campo Grande	43.3	6	37.4	5	9.5	3	6.6	1			13
Campolide	36.9	5	42.4	6	11.7	1	6.3	1			13
Carnide	25.8	4	25.6	3	40.8	6	4.9	-			13
Castelo	4.3	-	38.5	3	50.3	4	3.0	-			7
Charneca	28.1	4	34.3	5	23.4	3	10.8	1			13
Coração de Jesus	43.1	4	36.6	4	9.1	1	8.3	-			9
Encarnação	31.9	3	43.4	5	12.5	1	8.3	-			9
Graça	40.9	6	35.8	5	11.9	1	8.0	1			13
Lapa	54.9	8	25.2	4	5.6	-	4.1	-	7.4	1	13
Lumiar	44.8	10	35.7	7	8.4	1	6.0	1			19
Madalena	29.7	2	23.7	2	38.6	3	4.0	-			7
Mártires	57.4	5	32.1	2	2.4	-	5.3	-			7
Marvila	25.8	5	43.8	10	17.0	3	6.7	1			19
Mercês	30.0	3	43.4	5	15.2	1	7.5	-			9
Nossa Senhora de Fátima	50.4	7	32.7	5	8.0	1	5.5	-			13
Pena	31.1	3	32.3	4	10.6	1	7.2	-	14.5	1	9
Penha de França	36.0	5	39.7	6	11.6	1	8.8	1			13
Prazeres	42.0	6	35.2	5	12.7	1	7.7	1			13
Sacramento	31.0	3	40.5	3	15.9	1	8.4	-			7
Santa Catarina	31.0	3	46.0	5	11.4	1	8.3	-			9
Santa Engrácia	48.9	5	30.5	3	11.3	1	5.3	-			9
Santa Isabel	47.3	7	30.3	4	7.9	1	5.3	-	6.4	1	13
Santa Justa	25.9	2	45.9	5	17.0	1	7.0	-			7
Santa Maria Maior	49.0	7	32.6	5	9.6	1	5.9	-			13
Santa Maria dos Olivais	33.2	8	42.2	10	12.0	2	7.7	1			21
Santiago	30.5	2	33.7	3	25.1	2	6.9	-			7
Santo Condestável	38.0	5	38.2	6	12.4	1	7.3	1			13
Santo Estêvão	18.6	2	32.6	3	39.4	4	5.9	-			9
Santos-o-Velho	33.5	3	40.6	4	9.1	1	4.7	-	9.4	1	9
São Cristóvão e São Lourenço	30.2	3	46.0	5	13.8	1	6.2	-			9
São Domingos de Benfica	45.4	10	34.7	7	8.6	1	5.6	1			13
São Francisco Xavier	57.7	8	27.7	4	6.8	1	5.1	-			13
São João	38.2	5	38.2	6	12.7	1	7.8	1			13
São João de Brito	53.8	8	28.9	4	6.6	1	5.2	-	1.6	-	13
São João de Deus	55.7	8	30.0	4	6.5	1	4.7	-			13
São Jorge de Arroios	44.6	6	33.9	5	10.9	1	7.2	1			13
São José	41.0	4	32.0	3	13.2	1	8.6	1			9
São Mamede	52.4	8	32.4	5	6.1	-	6.1	-			13
São Miguel	16.2	1	50.2	6	24.9	2	4.7	-			9
São Nicolau	52.4	5	28.3	3	8.9	1	8.1	-			9
São Paulo	30.1	3	44.1	5	14.3	1	8.7	-			9
São Sebastião da Pedreira	57.8	9	28.6	5	4.8	-	5.7	-			13
Santo Estêvão	24.9	2	27.6	3	38.2	4	5.5	-			9
Sé	55.1	6	26.4	3	8.7	-	4.8	-			9
Socorro	20.8	2	29.5	3	10.4	1	5.8	-	28.7	3	9
Total	39.3	265	36.3	251	13.3	80	6.5	18	0.6	7	621
Source: Election Results
