= 1989 Lisbon local election =

1989 Lisbon local elections
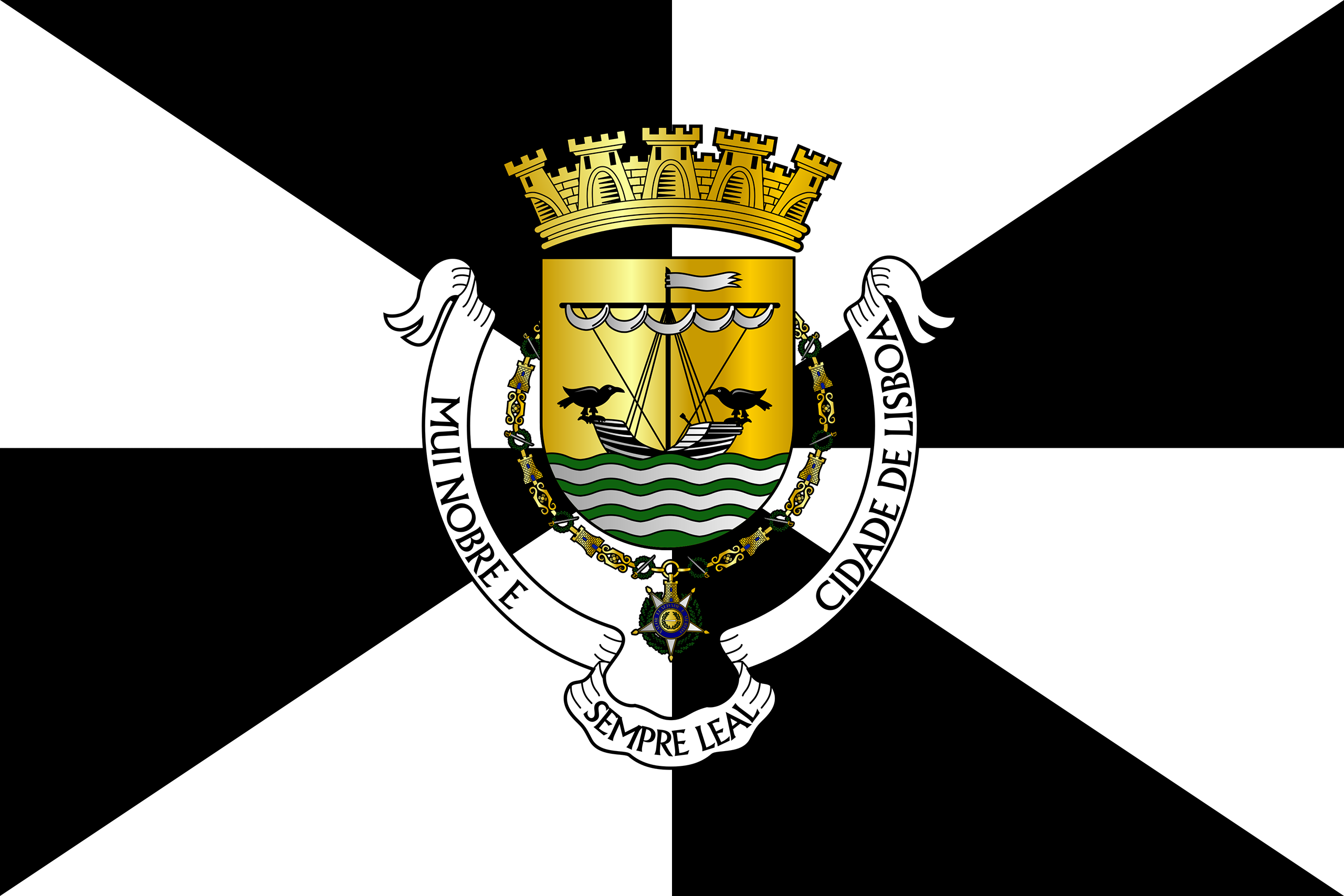
- 17 December 1989

All 17 Councillors in the Lisbon City Council 9 seats needed for a majority
- Turnout: 54.8% ▼4.0 pp
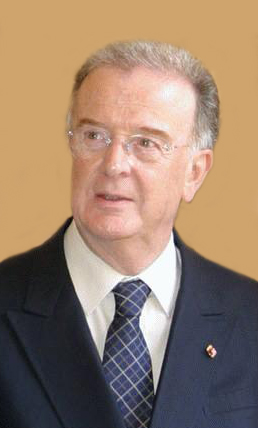

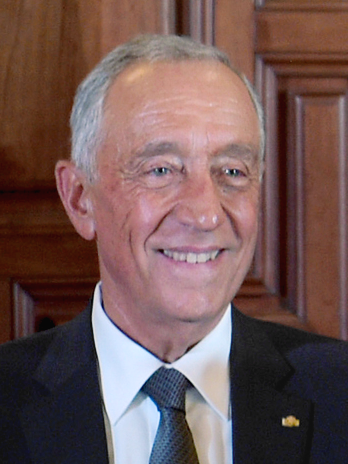
	First party	Second party
Leader	Jorge Sampaio	Marcelo Rebelo de Sousa
Party	PS	PSD
Alliance	For Lisbon (Note: Coalition with PS, PCP, PEV and MDP/CDE.)	Live Better in Lisbon (Note: Coalition with PSD, CDS and PPM.)
Last election	8 seats, 45.5% (Note: Sum of votes and seats of the APU and the PS in the 1985 election. APU: 27.5%, 5 seats; PS: 18.0%, 3 seats.)	9 seats, 49.8% (Note: Sum of votes and seats of the PSD and the PPM in the 1985 election. PSD: 44.8%, 8 seats; PPM: 5.1%, 1 seat.)
Seats won	9	8
Seat change	▲1	▼1
Popular vote	180,635	154,888
Percentage	49.1%	42.1%
Swing	▲3.6 pp	▼7.7 pp
Mayor before election
Nuno Krus Abecasis
PSD
Elected Mayor
Jorge Sampaio
PS

The 1989 Lisbon local election was held on 17 December 1989 to elect the members of the Lisbon City Council.

Former minister of Parliamentary Affairs, Marcelo Rebelo de Sousa, announced his candidacy for Mayor of Lisbon, with a coalition between the Social Democrats, the Centrists and the Monarchists. Meanwhile, Jorge Sampaio, the secretary-general of the Socialist Party, unnexpectedly announced that he would be the party's candidate for Mayor of Lisbon, forming a coalition with the Communist Party and its allies (PEV and MDP/CDE). Hermínio Martinho, the former leader of the Democratic Renewal Party, was also a candidate.

During the campaign, the Social Democratic candidate, Marcelo Rebelo de Sousa, organized several unusual acts, like diving into the Tagus river to highlight water pollution, driving a taxi and collecting garbage, but these actions backfired, by being seen as populist and artificial. On the other hand, Sampaio's campaign was seen as more sober, stable and authentic, with a final debate on RTP1 consolidating the Socialist's advantage. On election day, Sampaio won with 49% of the votes and 9 seats, beating Marcelo Rebelo de Sousa who got 42% of the votes and elected 8 seats.

== Background ==
In the 1985 election, incumbent Mayor Nuno Krus Abecasis ran as the Social Democratic candidate, winning with 44.8% of the votes and electing 8 seats, one short of a majority. The United People Alliance finished second, with 27.5% of the votes and 5 seats, well ahead of the Socialist Party, led by Helena Torres Marques, with 18.0% of the votes and 3 seats. The People's Monarchist Party ended up getting one seat, after getting 5.1% of the votes.

In August 1988, a massive urban fire destroyed part of the city's downtown, the Chiado area, with several shops and businesses being lost. The reconstruction took several years to complete, and Mayor Krus Abecasis faced several criticisms for his lack of urban and disaster relief planning.

== Electoral system ==
Each party or coalition must present a list of candidates. The winner of the most voted list for the municipal council is automatically elected mayor, similar to first-past-the-post (FPTP). The lists are closed and the seats in each municipality are apportioned according to the D'Hondt method.

== Parties and candidates ==
Party/Coalition		Political position	Candidate	1985 result		Ref.
Party/Coalition		Political position	Candidate	Votes (%)	Seats	Ref.
VML	Live Better in Lisbon; Viver Melhor em Lisboa PSD, CDS, PPM	Centre-right to right-wing	Marcelo Rebelo de Sousa	49.8%	9 / 17	
PL	For Lisbon; Por Lisboa PS, PCP, PEV, MDP/CDE	Centre-left to left-wing	Jorge Sampaio	45.5%	8 / 17	
PCTP	Portuguese Workers' Communist Party; Partido Comunista dos Trabalhadores Portugueses	Far-left	António Garcia Pereira	0.4%	0 / 17	
PRD	Democratic Renewal Party; Partido Renovador Democrático	Centre to centre-left	Hermínio Martinho	—N/a	0 / 17	
FER	Revolutionary Left Front; Frente da Esquerda Revolucionária	Far-left	Gil Garcia	—N/a	0 / 17	

== Opinion polling ==
Exit poll

Polling firm/Link	Fieldwork date	Sample size	PSD/CDS/ PPM		PS/CDU/ MDP/CDE		PRD	O	Lead
Polling firm/Link	Fieldwork date	Sample size	PSD	PPM	CDU	PS	PRD	O	Lead
1989 local election	17 Dec 1989	—N/a	42.1; 8		49.1; 9		3.1; 0	5.7; 0	7.0
Euroexpansão	17 Dec 1989	?	38.5–42.7; 7/8		47.8–52.0; 9/10		3.1–4.7; 0	–	9.3
1985 local election	15 Dec 1985	—N/a	44.8; 8	5.1; 1	27.5; 5	18.0; 3	—N/a	4.6; 0	17.3

== Results ==
=== Municipal Council ===
Summary of the 17 December 1989 Lisbon City Council election results
Graph of the party split among 17 seats.
Parties	Votes	%	±pp swing	Councillors	
Parties	Votes	%	±pp swing	Total	±
PS / PCP / PEV / MDP/CDE	180,635	49.07	▲3.6	9	▲1
PSD / CDS / PPM	154,888	42.07	▼7.7	8	▼1
Democratic Renewal	11,453	3.11	—N/a	0	—N/a
Portuguese Workers' Communist	6,390	1.74	▲1.3	0	0
Revolutionary Left Front	1,326	0.36	—N/a	0	—N/a
Total valid	342,132	96.59	▲0.1	17	0
Blank ballots	7,492	1.87	▲0.2		
Invalid ballots	5,659	1.54	▼0.1		
Total	367,610	100.00			
Registered voters/turnout	670,447	54.83	▼1.3		
Source: Lisbon 1989 election results

=== Municipal Assembly ===
Summary of the 17 December 1989 Lisbon City Council election results
Graph of the party split among 54 seats.
Parties	Votes	%	±pp swing	Seats	
Parties	Votes	%	±pp swing	Total	±
PS / PCP / PEV / MDP/CDE	182,237	49.57	▼0.7	28	▼1
PSD / CDS / PPM	154,744	42.09	▼2.3	24	▼1
Democratic Renewal	12,685	3.45	—N/a	2	—N/a
Portuguese Workers' Communist	6,390	1.42	▲0.7	0	—N/a
Total valid	354,425	96.52	▼0.4	54	0
Blank ballots	7,502	1.92	▲0.0		
Invalid ballots	5,717	1.56	▼0.4		
Total	367,644	100.00			
Registered voters/turnout	670,447	54.84	▼3.9		
Source: Lisbon 1989 election results

=== Parish Assemblies ===
Results of the 17 December 1989 Lisbon Parish Assembly elections
Parish	%	S	%	S	%	S	Total S
Parish	PS/CDU/ MDP/CDE		PSD/CDS/ PPM		PRD		Total S
Ajuda	61.2	13	30.2	6	3.5	-	19
Alcântara	58.8	12	34.8	7	2.7	-	19
Alto do Pina	39.8	5	53.8	8			13
Alvalade	34.7	5	59.9	8	2.4	-	13
Ameixoeira	57.6	8	34.2	5	2.9	-	13
Anjos	42.3	6	49.9	7	3.4	-	13
Beato	56.5	8	32.7	5	4.1	-	13
Benfica	50.9	12	41.3	9	2.6	-	21
Campo Grande	46.9	6	48.0	7			13
Campolide	52.8	11	37.4	8	4.4	-	19
Carnide	62.5	9	30.9	4			13
Castelo	64.1	5	29.4	2			7
Charneca	53.3	8	35.1	5			13
Coração de Jesus	40.5	6	52.4	7	3.7	-	13
Encarnação	50.7	7	41.2	6	5.2	-	13
Graça	54.7	8	39.8	5			13
Lapa	39.5	5	56.3	8			13
Lumiar	47.8	10	44.1	9	2.9	-	19
Madalena	50.7	4	42.8	3			7
Mártires	40.7	3	55.8	4			7
Marvila	64.1	14	21.8	5	5.4	1	20
Mercês	52.8	7	41.9	6			13
Nossa Senhora de Fátima	39.6	8	54.4	11	1.8	-	19
Pena	46.9	7	43.8	6	5.1	-	13
Penha de França	50.6	7	41.2	6	3.4	-	13
Prazeres	55.4	8	38.5	5			13
Sacramento	51.9	5	44.8	4			9
Santa Catarina	51.3	7	38.7	6	4.6	-	13
Santa Engrácia	52.9	7	41.8	6			13
Santa Isabel	42.7	6	47.9	7	3.7	-	13
Santa Justa	48.7	5	44.7	4			9
Santa Maria de Belém	50.0	7	43.6	6	3.1	-	13
Santa Maria dos Olivais	54.5	14	35.6	9	3.9	-	23
Santiago	63.6	6	33.2	3			9
Santo Condestável	51.3	11	40.6	8	2.9	-	19
Santo Estêvão	68.4	7	27.0	2			9
Santos-o-Velho	54.5	8	40.3	5			13
São Cristóvão e São Lourenço	49.4	5	45.9	4			9
São Domingos de Benfica	46.7	9	48.1	10	2.7	-	19
São Francisco Xavier	35.2	5	62.1	8			13
São João	52.8	11	39.1	8	3.3	-	19
São João de Brito	36.2	5	59.2	8	2.1	-	13
São João de Deus	36.5	5	60.6	8			13
São Jorge de Arroios	43.4	9	50.0	10	2.5	-	19
São José	52.5	7	43.1	6			13
São Mamede	42.7	6	53.8	7			13
São Miguel	71.2	7	22.3	2			9
São Nicolau	50.3	5	45.1	4			9
São Paulo	57.2	8	37.5	5			13
São Sebastião da Pedreira	34.0	4	62.9	9			13
Santo Vicente de Fora	62.6	9	33.4	4			13
Sé	48.7	5	46.3	4			9
Socorro	47.6	7	41.5	6	5.2	-	13
Total	49.7	392	42.7	325	2.4	1	718
Source: Election Results
