= 2001 Lisbon local election =

2001 Lisbon local elections
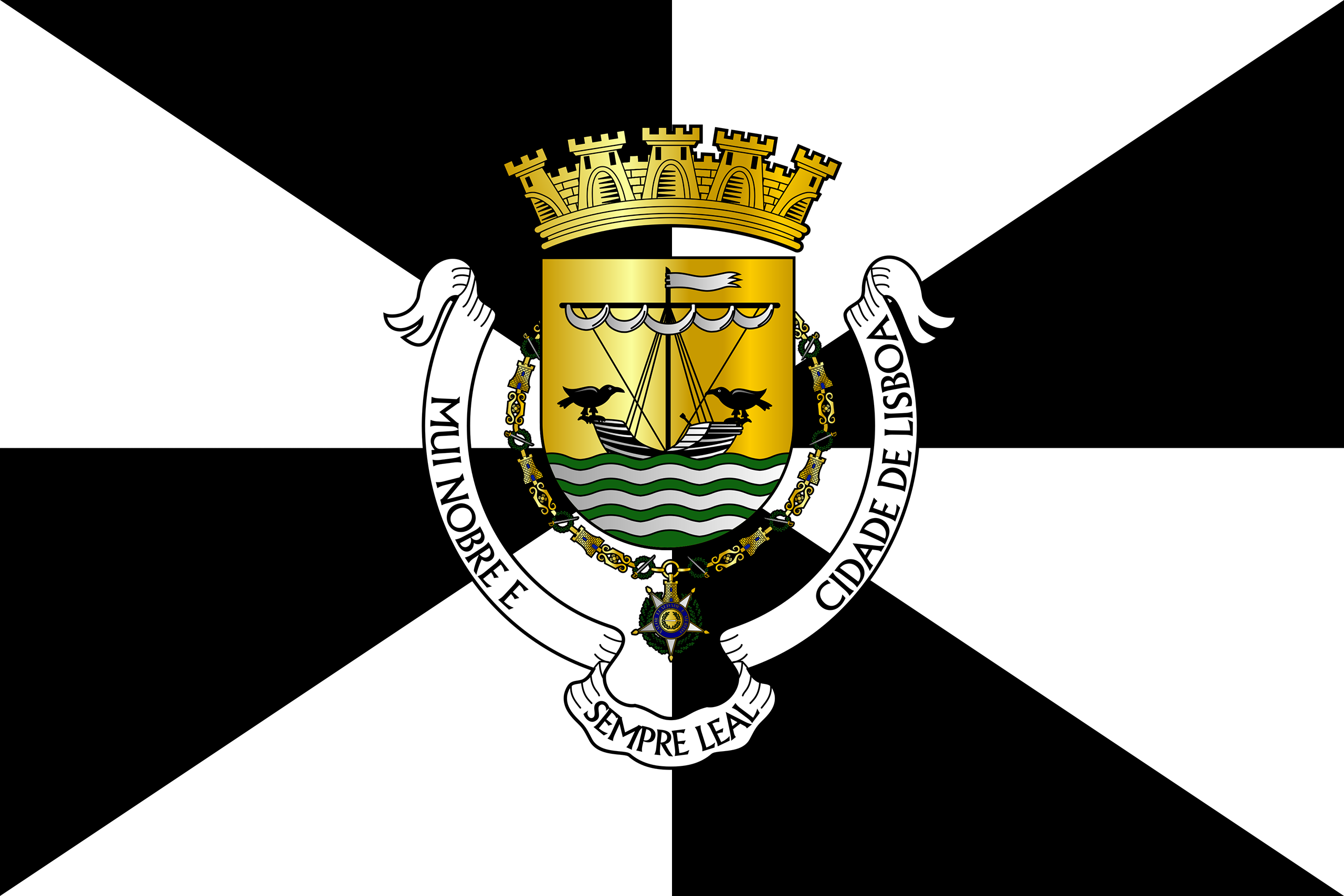
- 16 December 2001

All 17 Councillors in the Lisbon City Council 9 seats needed for a majority
- Opinion polls
- Turnout: 55.0% ▲6.7 pp
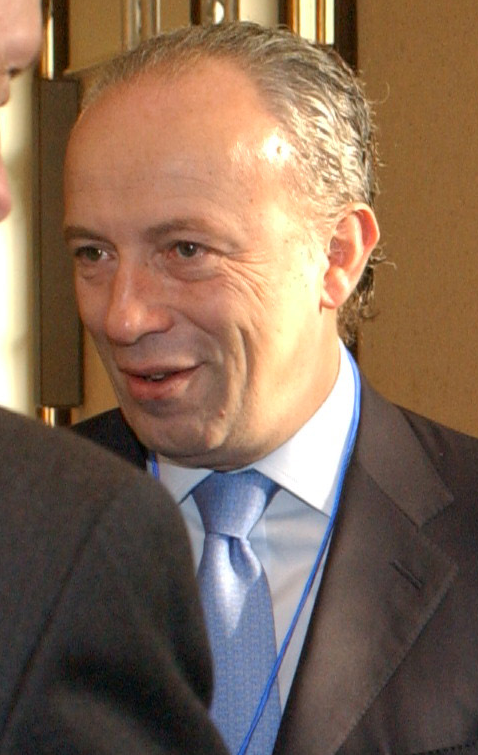

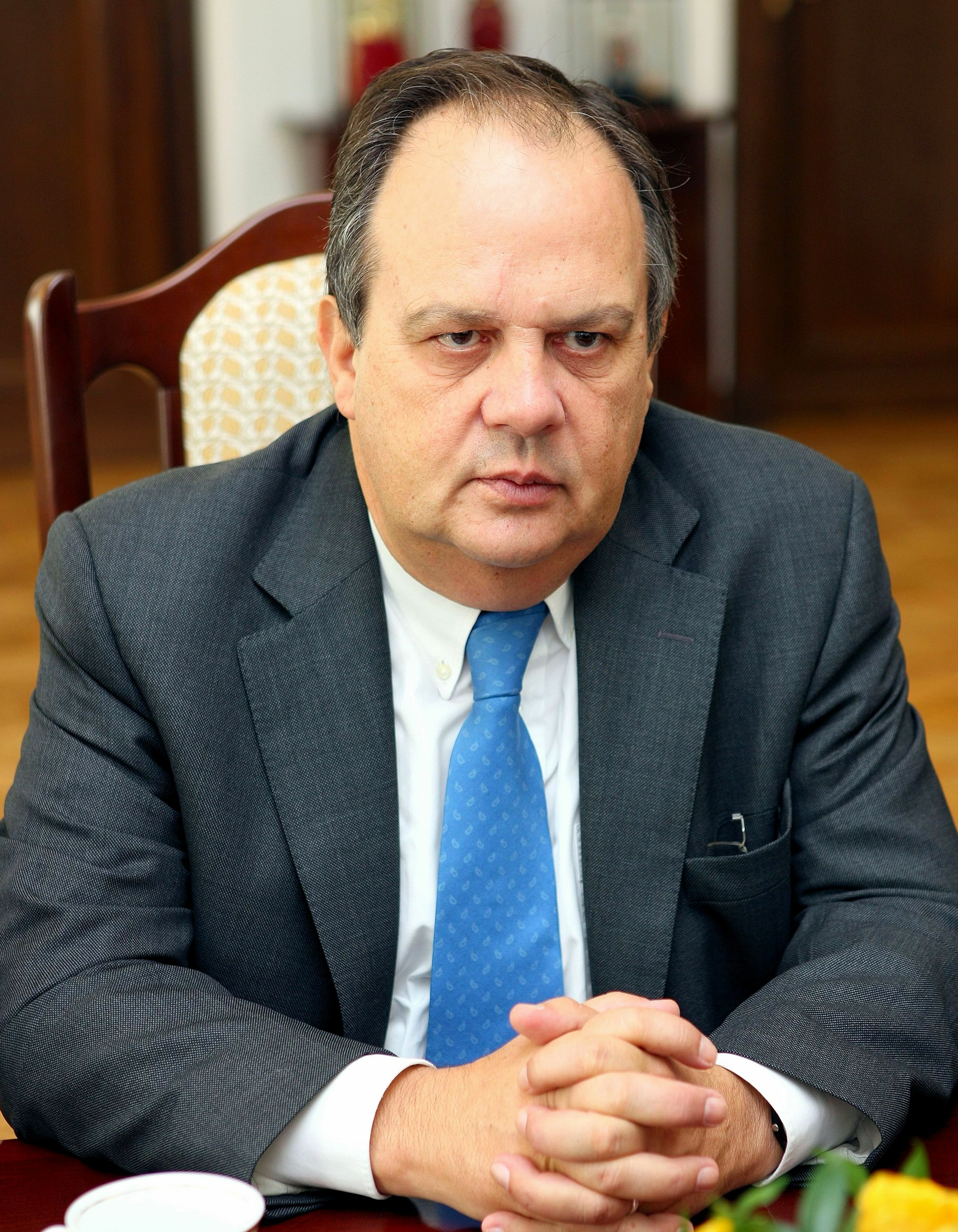

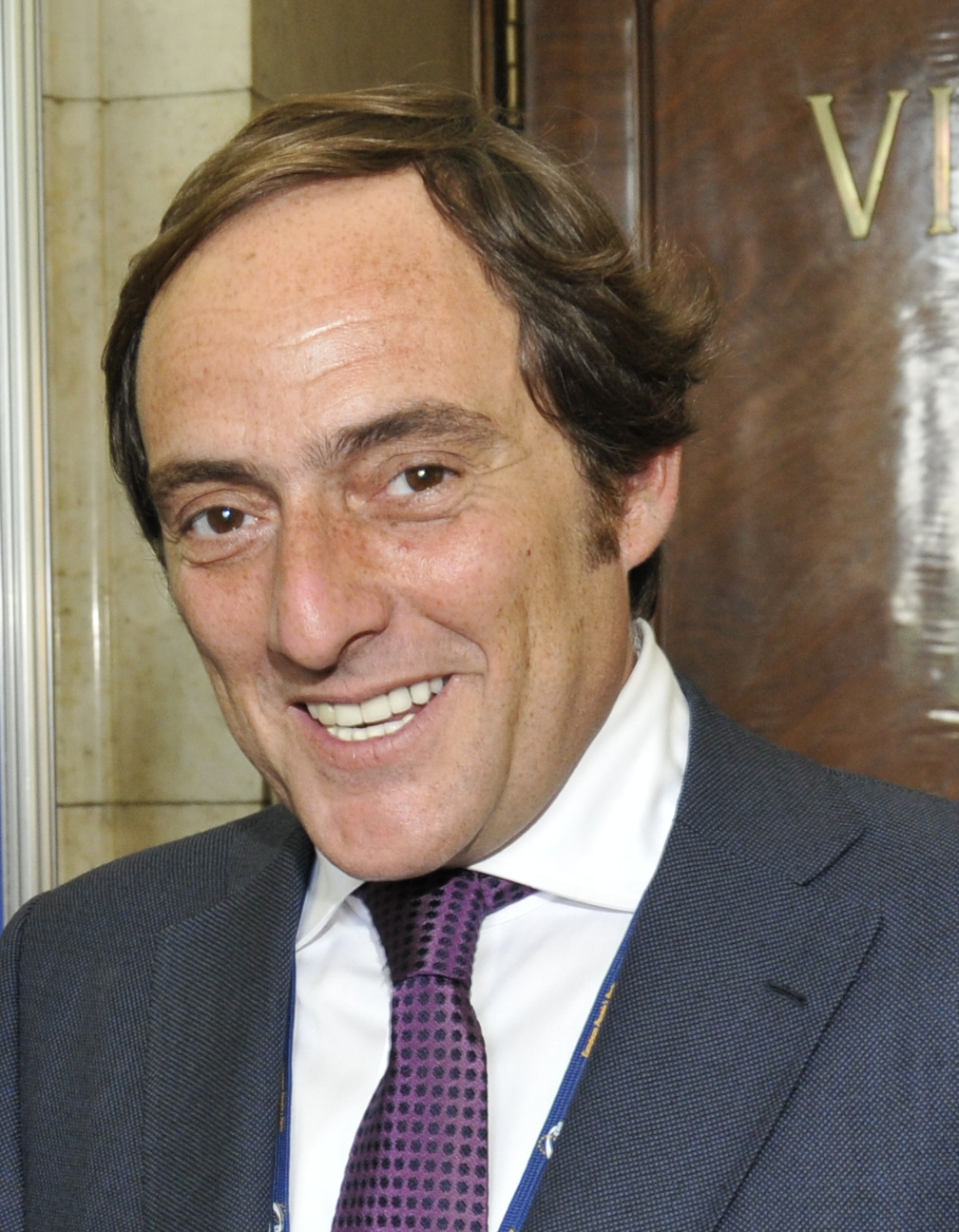

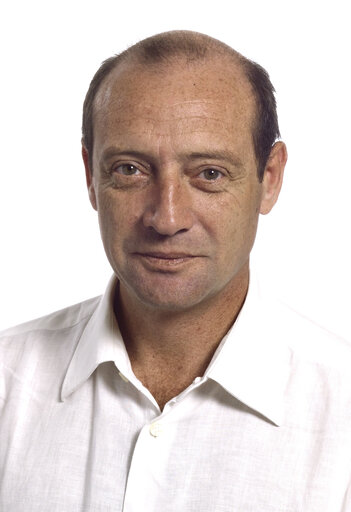
	First party	Second party
Leader	Pedro Santana Lopes	João Soares
Party	PSD	PS
Alliance	Happy Lisbon (Note: Coalition with PPD/PSD and PPM.)	Love Lisbon (Note: Coalition with PS, PCP and PEV.)
Last election	6 seats (LBC) (Note: The Social Democratic Party (PSD) and the People's Party (CDS–PP) contested the 1997 election in a coalition called LisBoa Cidade (LBC) and won a combined 39.3% of the vote and elected 7 councillors.)	10 seats, 51.9%
Seats won	8	8
Seat change	▲2	▼2
Popular vote	131,135	130,279
Percentage	42.0%	41.7%
Swing		▼10.2 pp
	Third party	Fourth party
Leader	Paulo Portas	Miguel Portas
Party	CDS–PP	BE
Last election	1 seat (LBC)	Did not contest
Seats won	1	0
Seat change	Steady	New party
Popular vote	23,584	11,877
Percentage	7.6%	3.8%
Swing		New party
Mayor before election
João Soares
PS
Elected Mayor
Pedro Santana Lopes
PSD

The 2001 Lisbon local election was held on 16 December 2001 to elect the members of the Lisbon City Council.

In an election that was considered an upset, incumbent mayor João Soares, running in a coalition between the Socialists, the Communists and the Greens, lost reelection against Pedro Santana Lopes, the Social Democratic candidate, who beat João Soares with a very narrow margin of less than 1,000 votes. The terrible results in this election ultimately led to Prime Minister António Guterres' resignation.

Paulo Portas, the CDS – People's Party candidate, won one seat in the city council, while Miguel Portas, Paulo Portas' brother and the Left Bloc candidate, failed to be elected.

== Background ==
In the 1997 election, the coalition between the Socialist Party, the Unitary Democratic Coalition and the People's Democratic Union, led by João Soares, the son of former president Mário Soares, won with an absolute majority, achieving 51.9% of the votes and 10 seats in the city council. They defeated the coalition between the Social Democratic Party and the People's Party, led by Ferreira do Amaral, who got 39.3% of the votes and 7 seats.

== Electoral system ==
Each party or coalition must present a list of candidates. The winner of the most voted list for the municipal council is automatically elected mayor, similar to first-past-the-post (FPTP). The lists are closed and the seats in each municipality are apportioned according to the D'Hondt method. Unlike in national legislative elections, independent lists are allowed to run.

== Parties and candidates ==
Party/Coalition		Political position	Candidate	1997 result	
Party/Coalition		Political position	Candidate	Votes (%)	Seats
AL	Love Lisbon; Amar Lisboa PS, PCP, PEV	Centre-left to left-wing	João Soares	51.9%	10 / 17
LF	Happy Lisbon; Lisboa Feliz PPD/PSD, PPM	Centre-right	Pedro Santana Lopes	39.3%	6 / 17
CDS–PP	CDS – People's Party; CDS – Partido Popular	Right-wing	Paulo Portas	39.3%	1 / 17
PCTP	Portuguese Workers' Communist Party; Partido Comunista dos Trabalhadores Portugueses	Far-left	António Garcia Pereira	1.9%	0 / 17
BE	Left Bloc; Bloco de Esquerda	Left-wing to far-left	Miguel Portas	—N/a	0 / 17
PH	Humanist Party; Partido Humanista	Centre-left	—N/a	—N/a	0 / 17
MPT	Earth Party; Partido da Terra	Center-right	Manuela Raposo Magalhães	—N/a	0 / 17
PNR	National Renovator Party; Partido Nacional Renovador	Far-right	—N/a	—N/a	0 / 17

== Opinion polling ==
Exit poll

Polling firm/Link	Fieldwork date	Sample size	PS PCP PEV	PSD PPM	CDS	BE	O	Lead
2001 local election	16 Dec 2001	—N/a	41.7; 8	42.0; 8	7.6; 1	3.8; 0	4.9; 0	0.3
UCP	16 Dec 2001	?	41– 45	39– 43	6–8	2.5– 4.5	–	2
Eurosondagem	16 Dec 2001	?	41.5– 45.3	42.1– 45.9	3.6– 6.0	3.1– 5.3	–	0.6
Intercampus	16 Dec 2001	?	42.8– 48.8	37.1– 43.1	5.5– 9.9	2.3– 5.3	–	5.7
Euroexpansão	8–12 Dec 2001	?	41.0	31.0	6.7	3.9	17.4	10.0
UCP	9 Dec 2001	1,585	41.6; 8	37.1; 7	8.8; 1	5.9; 1	6.6; 0	4.5
SIC/Visão	2 Dec 2001	?	41.6	41.8	—N/a	—N/a	16.6	0.2
SIC/Visão	9 Nov 2001	?	41.6	41.3	6.5	1.0	9.6	0.3
Euroteste	9 Nov 2001	?	37	39	6	4	14	2
UCP	5 Nov 2001	1,148	41.9	42.5	8.4	4.8	2.4	0.6
Euroexpansão	21 Apr 2001	?	33	28	11	3	25	5
UCP	16–20 Mar 2001	1,192	38.0	37.5	11.0	7.7	5.8	0.5
1999 legislative election	10 Oct 1999	—N/a	50.3 (9)	29.6 (5)	10.2 (2)	6.0 (1)	3.9 (0)	20.7
1997 local election	14 Dec 1997	—N/a	51.9; 10	39.3; 7		—N/a	8.8; 0	12.6

== Results ==
=== Municipal Council ===
Summary of the 16 December 2001 Lisbon City Council election results
Graph of the party split among 17 seats.
Parties	Votes	%	±pp swing	Councillors	
Parties	Votes	%	±pp swing	Total	±
Social Democratic / People's Monarchist	131,135	41.98	—N/a	8	▲2
Socialist / Communist / The Greens	130,279	41.70	▼10.2	8	▼2
People's	23,584	7.55	—N/a	1	0
Left Bloc	11,877	3.80	—N/a	0	—N/a
Portuguese Workers' Communist	2,419	0.77	▼1.1	0	0
Humanist	1,352	0.43	—N/a	0	—N/a
Earth	1,347	0.43	—N/a	0	—N/a
National Renovator	652	0.21	—N/a	0	—N/a
Total valid	302,645	96.88	▲1.2	17	0
Blank ballots	5,902	1.89	▼0.2		
Invalid ballots	3,844	1.23	▼1.0		
Total	312,391	100.00			
Registered voters/turnout	567,867	55.01	▲6.7		
Source: Lisbon 2001 election results

=== Municipal Assembly ===
Summary of the 16 December 2001 Lisbon City Council election results
Graph of the party split among 54 seats.
Parties	Votes	%	±pp swing	Seats	
Parties	Votes	%	±pp swing	Total	±
Socialist / Communist / The Greens	129,852	41.57	▼9.8	24	▼6
Social Democratic / People's Monarchist	124,457	39.84	—N/a	23	—N/a
People's	27,100	8.68	—N/a	5	—N/a
Left Bloc	15,099	4.83	—N/a	2	—N/a
Portuguese Workers' Communist	2,733	0.87	▼1.1	0	▼1
Earth	1,970	0.63	—N/a	0	—N/a
National Renovator	779	0.25	—N/a	0	—N/a
Total valid	301,990	96.68	▼1.2	54	0
Blank ballots	6,633	2.12	▼0.1		
Invalid ballots	3,760	1.20	▲1.0		
Total	312,383	100.00			
Registered voters/turnout	567,867	55.01	▲6.7		
Source: Lisbon 2001 election results

=== Parish Assemblies ===
Results of the 16 December 2001 Lisbon Parish Assembly elections
Parish	%	S	%	S	%	S	%	S	%	S	%	S	Total S
Parish	PS/CDU		PSD/PPM		CDS–PP		BE		IND		PCTP		Total S
Ajuda	56.8	9	29.9	4	6.1	-	3.7	-					13
Alcântara	53.2	8	32.5	5	6.3	-	4.6	-					13
Alto do Pina	32.0	4	52.2	8	7.8	1	4.6	-					13
Alvalade	28.6	4	50.2	7	12.7	2	5.8	-					13
Ameixoeira	46.3	7	37.1	5	8.7	1	3.7	-					13
Anjos	36.0	5	43.3	6	10.0	1	6.3	1					13
Beato	49.0	8	28.9	4	8.4	1	5.4	-			4.0	-	13
Benfica	44.6	10	40.1	9	7.4	1	4.1	1			1.0	-	21
Campo Grande	41.4	6	42.1	6	8.7	1	5.0	-					13
Campolide	47.7	7	36.1	5	8.1	1	4.3	-					13
Carnide	46.0	7	36.3	5	8.9	1	4.7	-					13
Castelo	62.2	5	22.1	2	6.3	-							7
Charneca	52.6	8	29.9	4	8.7	1	4.3	-					13
Coração de Jesus	37.8	6	42.6	6	10.9	1	5.5	-					13
Encarnação	45.2	5	34.8	3	9.6	1	6.2	-					9
Graça	42.3	6	39.1	6	7.8	1	5.9	-					13
Lapa	29.4	4	49.8	7	13.3	2	5.0	-					13
Lumiar	40.9	8	41.7	9	7.8	1	5.3	1					20
Madalena	53.0	4	32.9	2	11.1	1							7
Mártires	42.2	3	12.6	1	39.3	3							7
Marvila	54.8	12	25.4	5	7.6	1	4.4	1			2.9	-	19
Mercês	46.6	7	34.1	5	9.7	1	5.2	-					13
Nossa Senhora de Fátima	31.0	5	45.6	7	10.2	1	4.2	-	5.8	-			13
Pena	41.8	6	37.9	5	9.5	1	6.8	1					13
Penha de França	44.3	6	40.5	6	7.1	1	4.5	-					13
Prazeres	46.3	7	36.6	5	9.0	1	5.5	-					13
Sacramento	38.1	4	43.6	4	13.3	1							7
Santa Catarina	50.0	5	32.4	3	9.7	1	5.2	-					9
Santa Engrácia	36.1	5	26.1	4	6.5	1	3.2	-	23.4	3			13
Santa Isabel	33.7	5	47.0	7	10.0	1	6.0	-					13
Santa Justa	46.6	4	28.4	2	18.4	1							7
Santa Maria de Belém	38.6	6	42.7	6	10.1	1	5.5	-					13
Santa Maria dos Olivais	50.2	11	31.2	7	6.2	1	4.3	1			4.4	1	21
Santiago	53.7	5	31.4	3	10.1	1							9
Santo Condestável	44.3	6	39.3	6	8.0	1	4.5	-					13
Santo Estêvão	40.6	4	19.1	2	5.5	-			28.8	3			9
Santos-o-Velho	44.6	5	34.1	3	12.1	1	6.1	-					9
São Cristóvão e São Lourenço	49.0	5	31.8	3	13.5	1							9
São Domingos de Benfica	36.4	7	46.4	10	8.2	1	5.1	1					19
São Francisco Xavier	29.0	4	52.8	8	10.2	1	5.7	-					13
São João	46.2	7	36.2	5	8.9	1	5.2	-					13
São João de Brito	28.2	4	51.3	7	13.3	2	3.9	-					13
São João de Deus	28.4	4	51.9	8	12.6	1	4.4	-					13
São Jorge de Arroios	36.1	7	45.2	9	10.1	2	5.3	1					19
São José	44.0	4	38.4	4	10.3	1							9
São Mamede	33.1	5	48.2	7	10.8	1	4.7	-					13
São Miguel	62.3	7	24.9	2	7.0	-					2.3	-	9
São Nicolau	48.2	5	38.0	3	10.2	1							9
São Paulo	53.3	5	31.8	3	9.8	1							9
São Sebastião da Pedreira	24.9	3	46.6	7	20.2	3	6.2	-					13
Santo Vicente de Fora	57.6	6	27.6	2	10.2	1							9
Sé	47.2	5	27.5	2	19.9	2							9
Socorro	43.9	4	9.9	1	39.5	4							9
Total	42.6	309	38.8	265	9.1	60	4.6	8	0.6	6	0.7	1	649
Source: Election Results
