= Pillory of Lisbon =

- Pelourinho de Lisboa
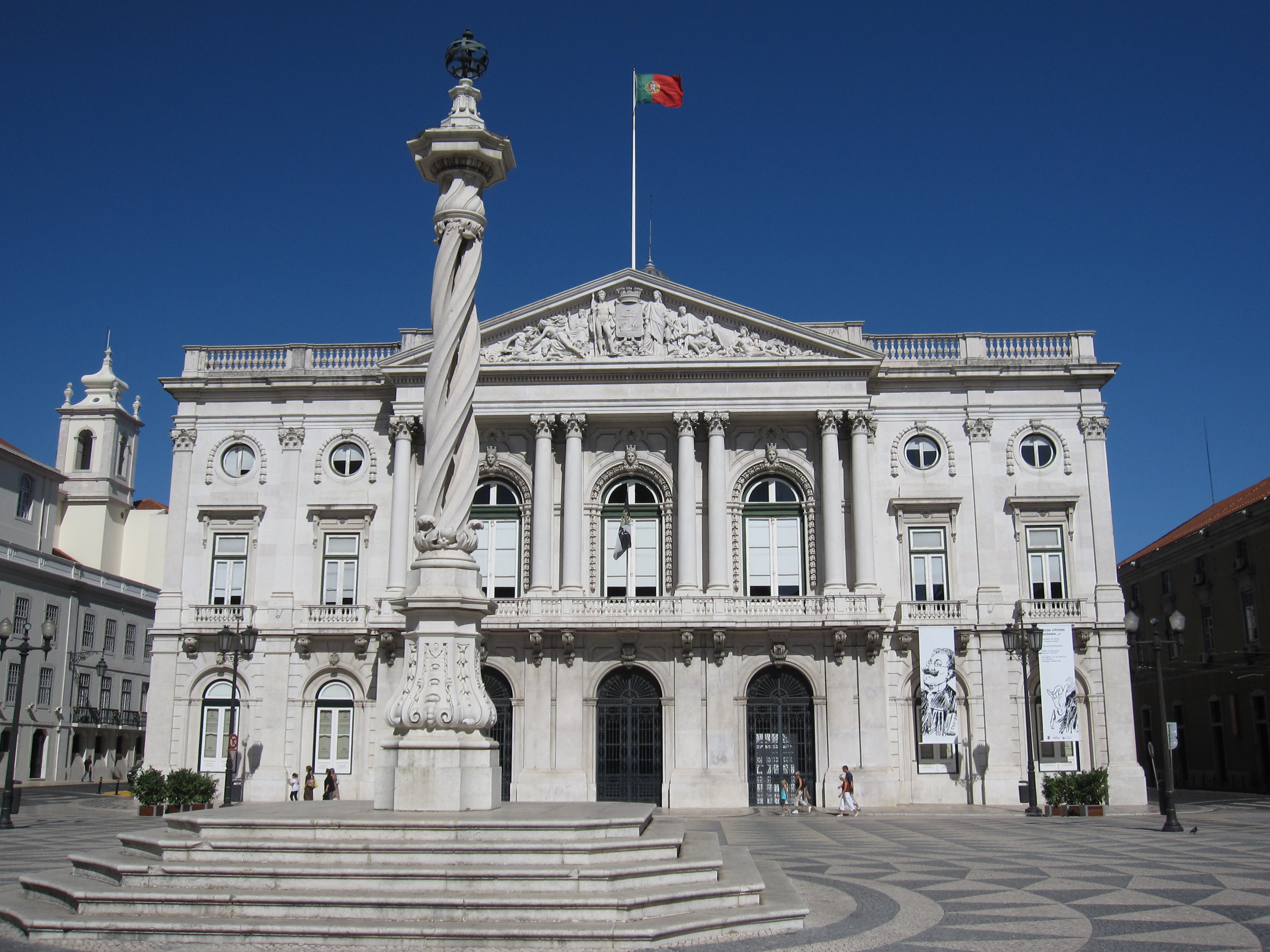
- The pillory in the main square and the municipal council of Lisbon

- Location within Lisbon

General information
- Type: Pillory
- Classification: National Monument
- Location: Santa Maria Maior, Portugal
- Coordinates: 38°42′29″N 9°8′21″W
- Owner: Portuguese Republic

Technical details
- Material: Lioz limestone

Design and construction
- Architect: Eugénio dos Santos

The Pillory of Lisbon (Portuguese: Pelourinho de Lisboa) is a pillory situated in the municipal square of the Portuguese capital (in the civil parish of Santa Maria Maior in the municipality of Lisbon), classified as a National Monument (Monumento Nacional).

== History ==
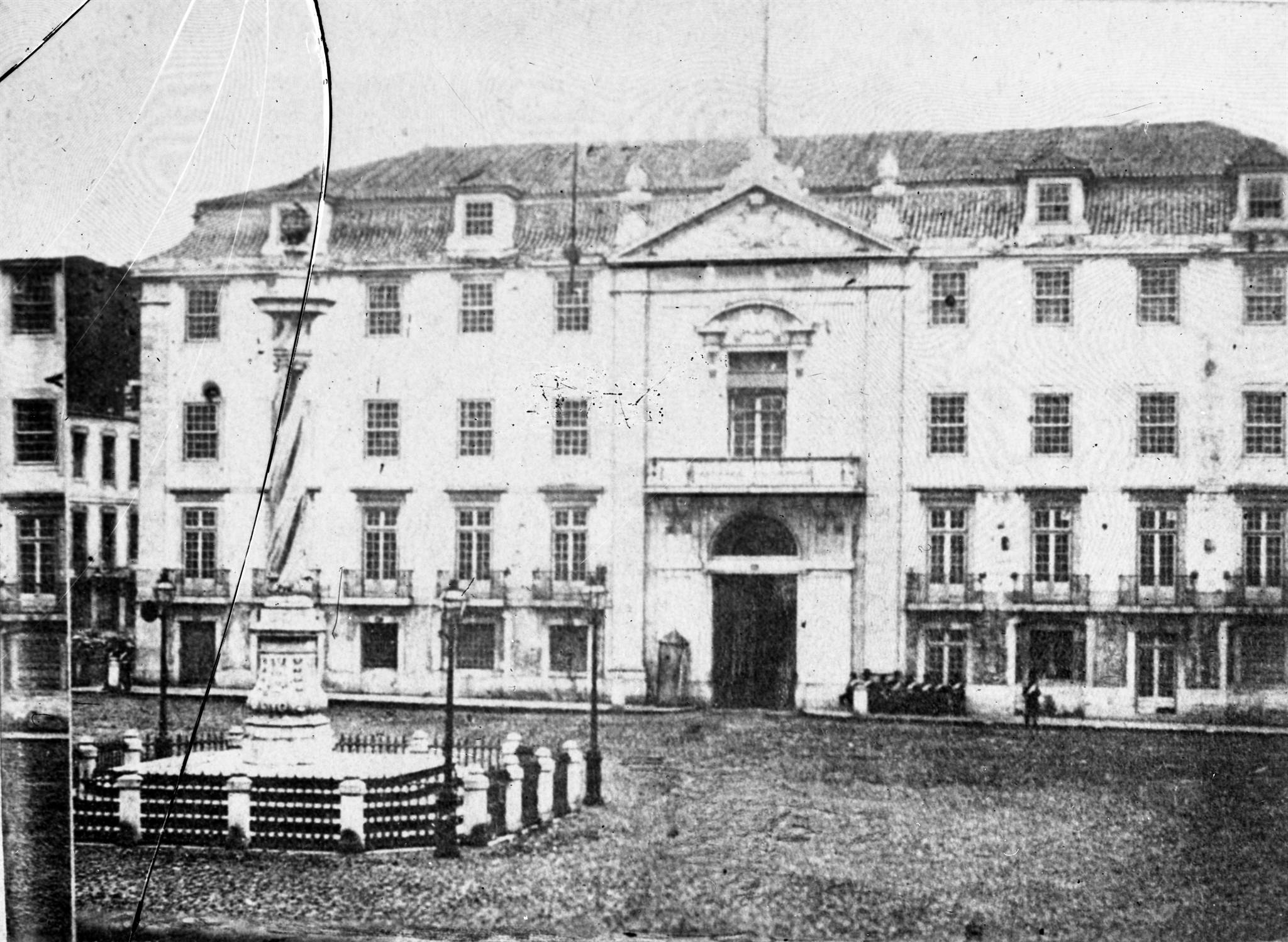
The pillory at the foot of the municipal council hall with protective iron grate in 1863, erected to restrict access to the monument.

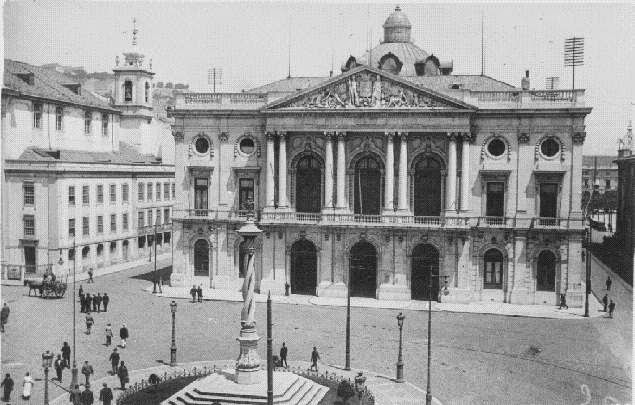
The square and pillory consolidated into the traffic circle in the 1880s

Praça do Município in Lisbon, with City Hall in the background and the pillory in the centre of the square

Lisbon pillory in front of City Hall

The date of construction of Lisbon's first pillory is unknown, but was probably in or before 1179 following the granting of a charter to Lisbon by Afonso I of Portugal. The earliest written records date for that structure date to late 14th century. Later records place the pillory at various places in the city; but all traces of this and many other structures were destroyed in the Lisbon earthquake of 1755.

On 31 August 1470, royal ordinance referred to affixing editals (notices) on the "local" pillory. The earliest record of this structure may have referred to a pillory located at the port customs house, referenced in documents during the reign of King John II.

By the 16th century, the primitive pillory (Pelourinho Velho) was situated in the Praça do Pelourinho, alongside the Rua Bela da Rainha (today the Rua da Prata). The probable construction of the new pillory occurred in 1619, in the Praça do Pelourinho Novo, alongside the river. In the urban plans of João Nunes Tinoco, dated to 1650, included the Praça do Pelourinho Velho and Praça do Pelourinho Novo.

On 8 April 1633, the municipal government debated the construction of a spring in the Praça do Pelourinho Velho, in order to improve the quantity and quality of water in the city. Sometime in the 17th century, the Senate approved the demolition of the pillory. The municipality later (1690) authorized (by the monarch) to construct homes along the river. On 16 December 1705, D. Luís Baltazar da Silveira solicited authorization to build a home on the site of the old pillory, in which he would pay 50$000 réis annually and donation to the city of 600$000 réis. The King approved the rental on 4 February 1706. On 20 November 1738, the municipal council consulted the King to afix the pillory, with the usual locals debated: the Ribeira, Terreiro do Paço, Remolares, Boavista and Confeitaria. Before the earthquake of 1755, the Largo do Pelourinho was located at the place where the last block of the Rua do Comércio is located, between the streets of Fanqueiros and Madalena. This border was delimited to the south by the Fernandine Wall and gave passage to the landfill of the Ribeira, through the Portas da Ribeira. Flanking this stood the customs house and "house of weights and measures", and the buildings that housed the Senate.

On 1 November 1755, the Lisbon earthquake destroyed both pillory and square. During the course of the reconstruction, by 1783, the Largo do Pelourinho was constructed (along the old Largo da Tanoaria, delineated by Eugénio dos Santos. The only local execution at the site occurred in 1790, when a cadet was executed for murdering his brother.

In 1808, during the course of the sack by French forces during the Peninsular War, Jean-Andoche Junot left the structure behind (although the General was interested in taking the structure) when they were expelled in 1808. The structure was vandalized in 1834, when the iron hooks (in the form of crosses) were removed (and had figured in early drawings of the structure in 1832). Civil authorities looked to an iron grate around the monument to protect the structure.

On 24 March 1886, the square became known as the Praça do Município.

In 1910, the Pillory of Lisbon was decreed to be a national monument of Portugal.

In 1968, a study was issued to analyze the protection of the pillory and establish a protection zone. This interest in preservation lead to an initiative by the DRCLisboa on 22 August 2006, to define a Special Protection Zone (ZPE) along with the Saint George's Castle and its fortifications, the Pombaline Downtown and several other properties surrounding the lower quarter. The National Council for Culture (Portuguese: Conselho Nacional de Cultura) proposed archiving the ZPE on 10 October 2011, which was supported on 18 October by IGESPAR which agreed that the area required better definition.

In the second half of the 20th century, the structure was cleaned and consolidated with iron framework.

== Architecture ==
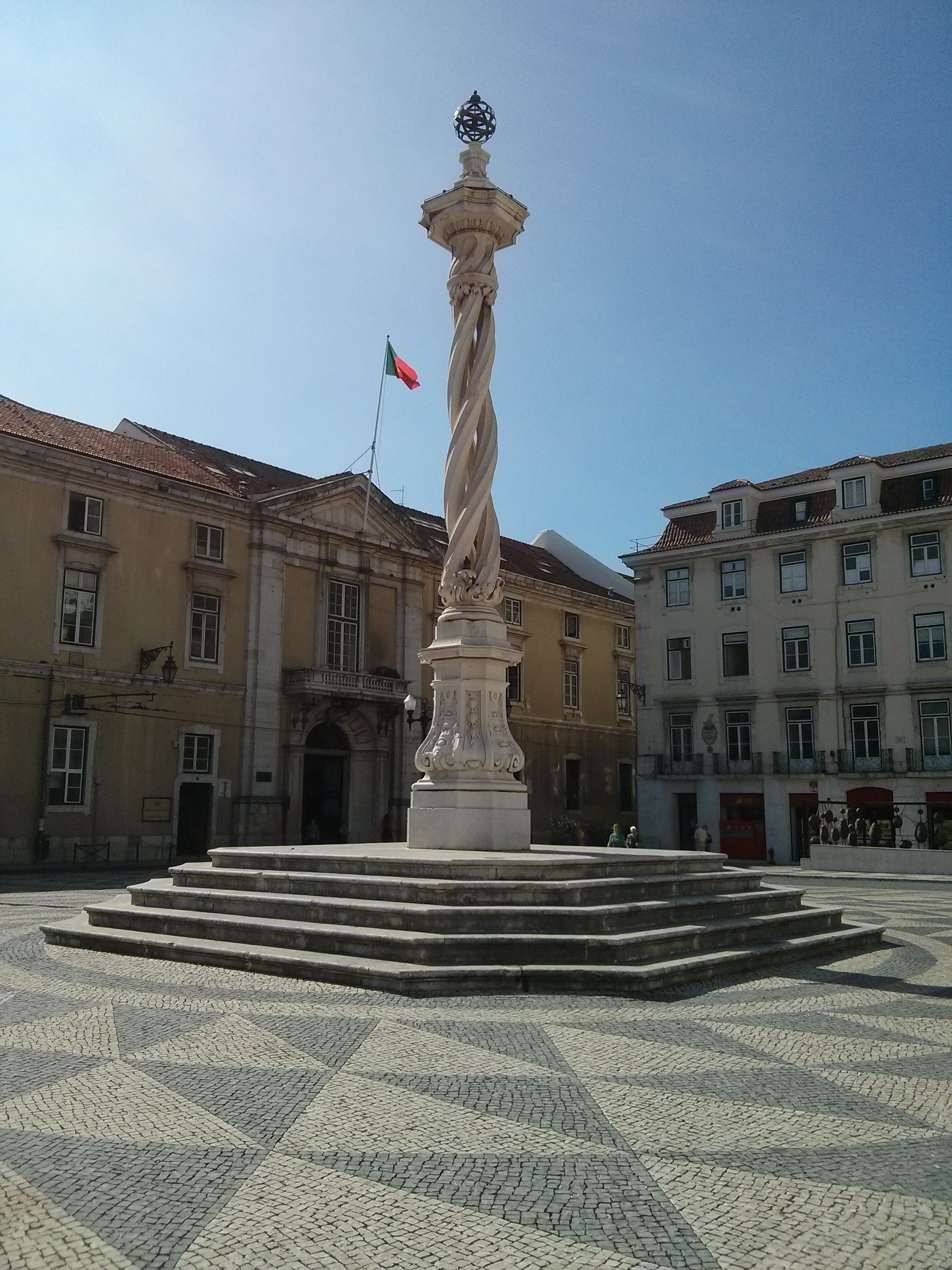
The triple-twist column of the pillory

The pillory is located in the Pombeline urban area, implanted in the centre of a rectangular square, comprising a level platform decorated in triangular-shaped Portuguese pavement, circled by four roadways and buildings to the north and west (including the municipal council of Lisbon, the Church of São Julião and the Navy Arsenal.

It consists of an octagonal platform of five steps of limestone, which support a sculpted pillar of marble, which supports a metal armillary sphere. The pillar is monolithic; that is, it is carved from a single piece of stone. It consists of a quadrangular base, an elaborate onion-shaped portion, an open threefold stone helix, and an upper octagonal platform. At one time, it had an iron crosspiece with hooks, and was surrounded by an iron railing.
