= Santa Maria Maior, Lisbon =

Santa Maria Maior
- Civil parish
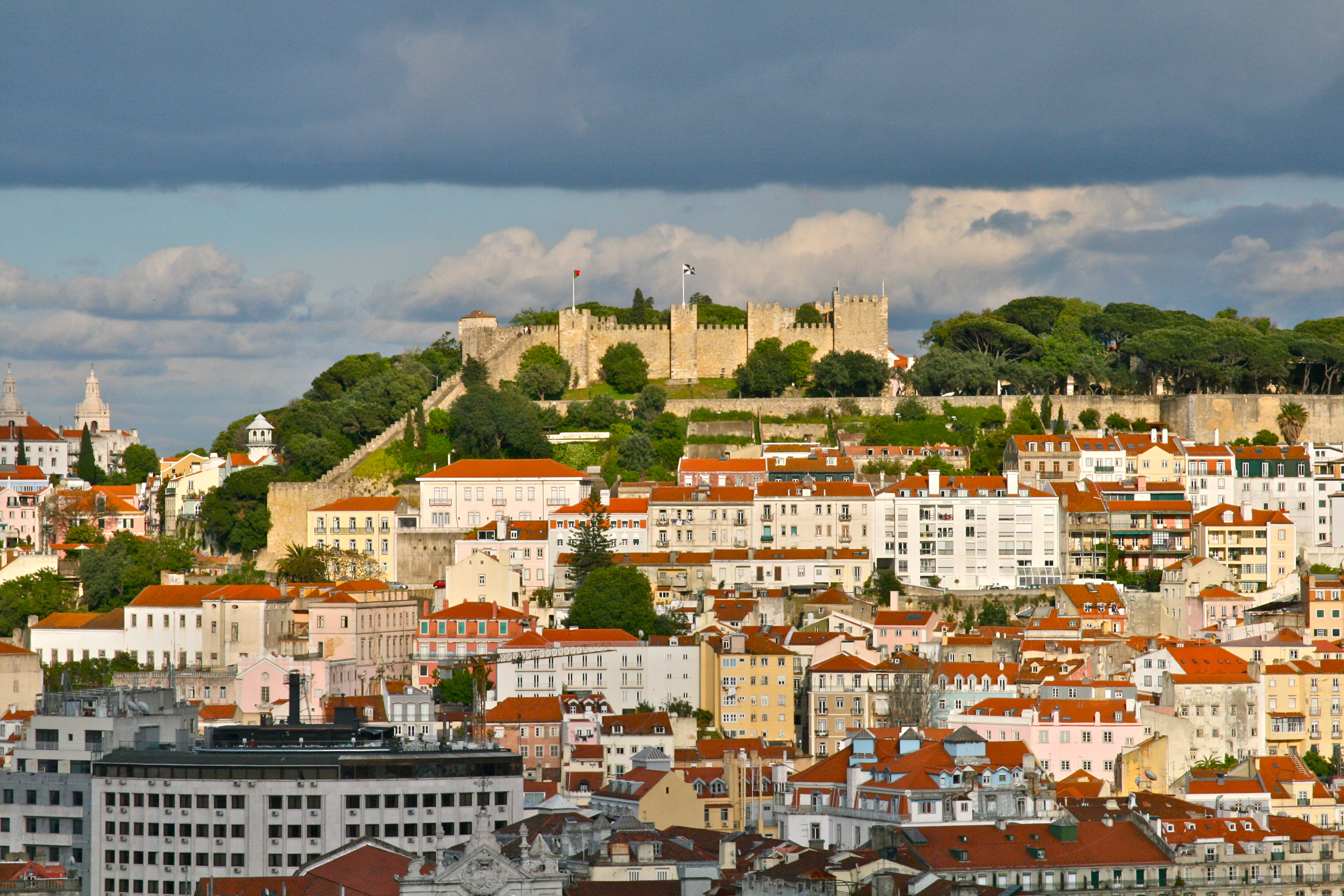
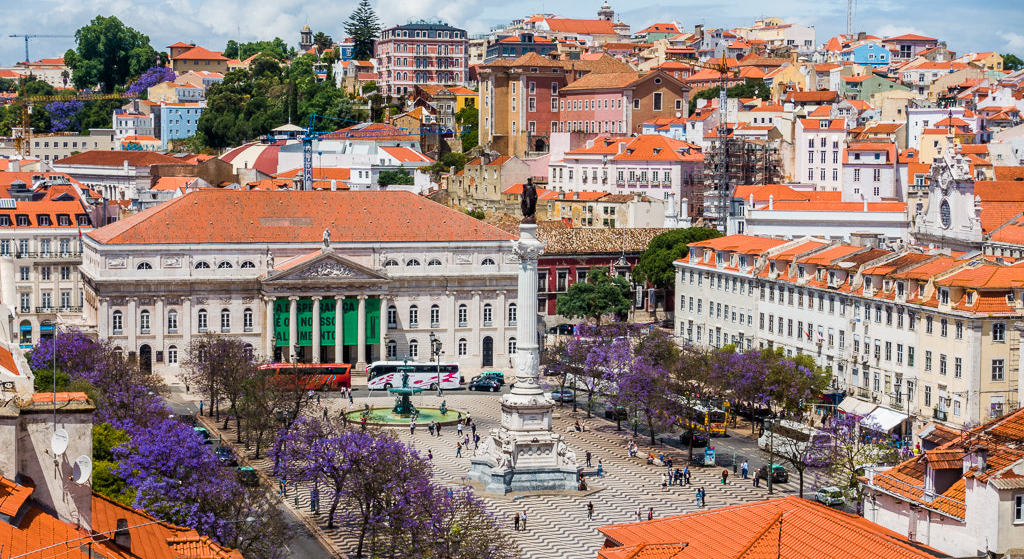
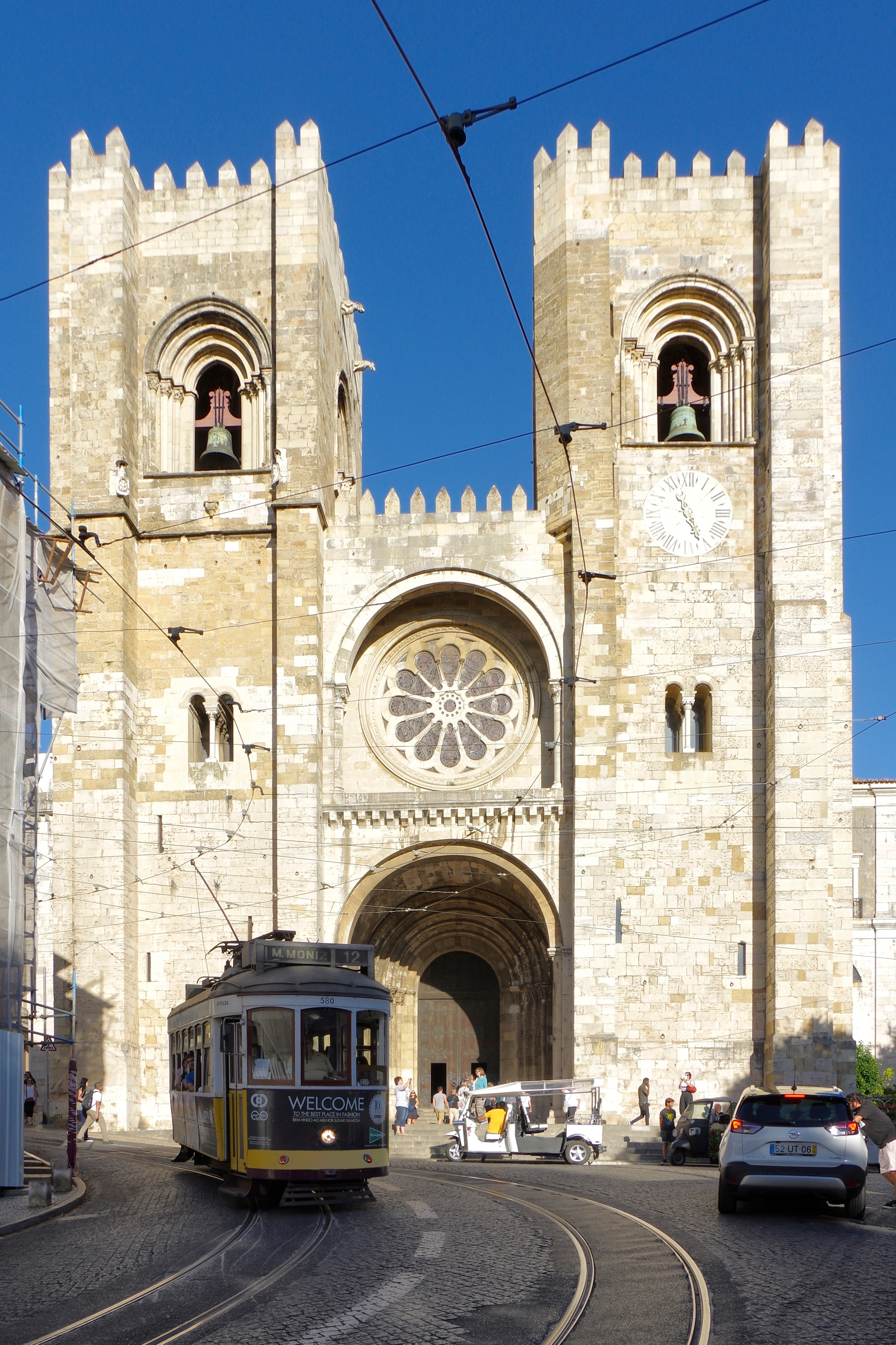
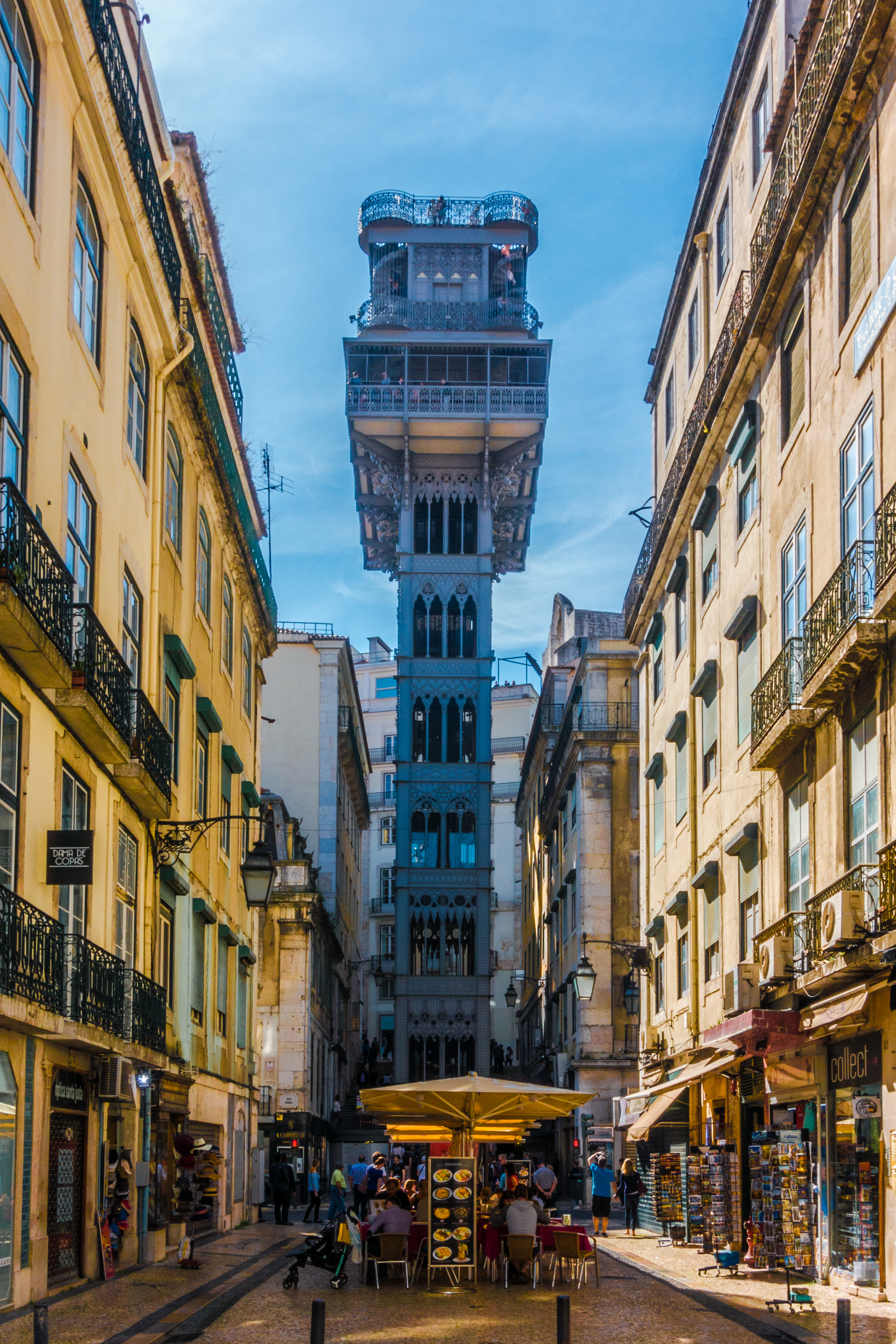
- Clockwise: São Jorge Castle; the Rossio; Lisbon City Hall; Santa Justa Elevator; Lisbon Cathedral.

- Coordinates: 38.713°N 9.136°W
- Country: Portugal
- Region: Lisbon
- Metropolitan area: Lisbon
- District: Lisbon
- Municipality: Lisbon

Area
  - Total: 3.01 km^{2} (1.16 sq mi)

Population (2011)
  - Total: 12,822
  - Density: 4,260/km^{2} (11,000/sq mi)
- Time zone: UTC+00:00 (WET)
  - Summer (DST): UTC+01:00 (WEST)

Santa Maria Maior (Portuguese pronunciation: [ˈsɐ̃tɐ mɐˈɾi.ɐ mɐˈjɔɾ]) is a freguesia (civil parish) of Lisbon, the capital of Portugal. Located in the historic center of Lisbon, Santa Maria Maior is to the west of São Vicente, east of Misericórdia, and south of Arroios and Santo António. It is home to numerous historic monuments, including Lisbon Cathedral, the Rossio, and the Praça do Comércio, as well as famous neighborhoods, such as the Lisbon Baixa, as well as parts of Bairro Alto and Alfama. The population in 2011 was 12,822,

== History ==
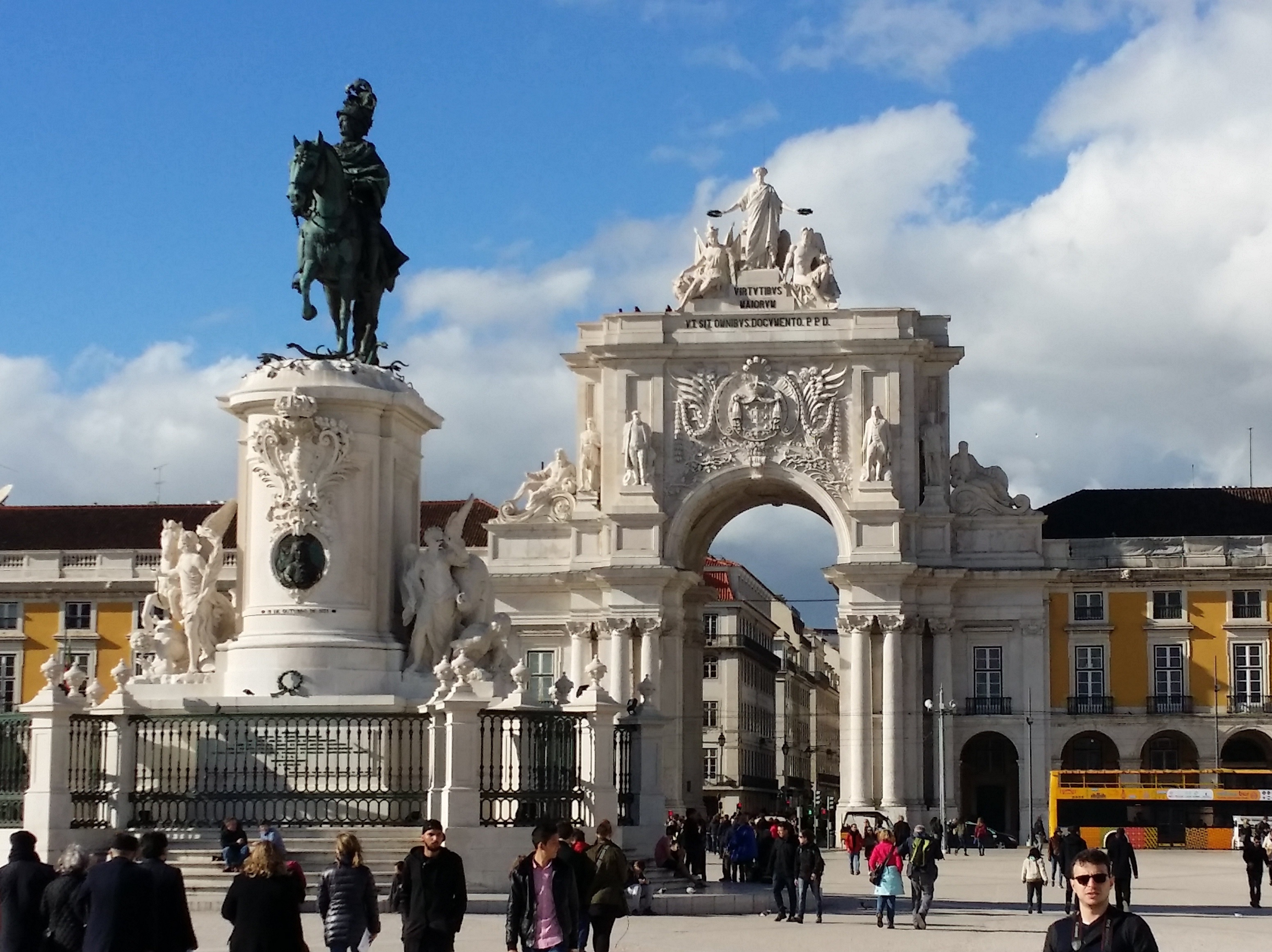
The Praça do Comércio.

The parish was created by the administrative reorganization of Lisbon on 8 December 2012, from the incorporation of other 12 old small parishes: Mártires, Sacramento, São Nicolau, Madalena, Santa Justa, Sé, Santiago, São Cristóvão e São Lourenço, Castelo, Socorro, São Miguel and Santo Estêvão.

The official name of the freguesia comes from Cathedral of Santa Maria Maior, seat of the Patriarchate of Lisbon.

The Baixa was built following the destruction of the 1755 Great Earthquake of Lisbon, under orders of King Joseph I of Portugal's prime minister, Sebastião José de Carvalho e Melo, 1st Marquis of Pombal, whose architects rebuilt the area in what is known as the Pombaline style.

== Landmarks ==
- Baixa neighborhood
  - Pillory of Lisbon
  - Lisbon Cathedral
  - Praça do Comércio
  - Praça da Figueira
  - Restauradores Square
  - Rossio
  - Queen Maria II National Theatre
  - Santa Justa Elevator
  - Lisbon City Hall
- Alfama neighborhood
  - Casa dos Bicos
  - Santo António Church
  - Igreja de Santa Luzia
  - Largo das Portas do Sol
- Castelo neighborhood
  - São Jorge Castle
