= Santiago, Lisbon =

Coordinates: 38°42′42″N 9°07′50″W

Santiago
- Former civil parish
- Interactive map of Santiago
- Country: Portugal
- Region: Lisboa
- District: Lisboa
- Municipality: Lisbon
- Established: 1160
- Abolished: 8 November 2012

Area
  - Total: 0.06 km^{2} (0.023 sq mi)

Population (2011)
  - Total: 619
  - Density: 10,000/km^{2} (27,000/sq mi)

Santiago is a former civil parish (freguesia) and a historic neighborhood of Lisbon, the capital of Portugal.

Following a major administrative reorganization of the city on 8 November 2012, the parish was abolished and its territory was integrated into the newly created parish of Santa Maria Maior.

== History ==
The history of Santiago is intrinsically linked to the medieval heart of Lisbon. It is one of the oldest settled areas of the city, with archaeological evidence pointing to continuous occupation since the Roman period. Documentary references to the parish date back to the late 13th century, specifically to 1299, although the original church dedicated to Saint James the Greater (São Tiago) was founded around 1160, shortly after the conquest of Lisbon by the Christian forces of King Afonso Henriques.

In the 17th century, the neighborhood gained international diplomatic significance. In 1668, the local Convent of the Lóios (Convento dos Lóios) served as the venue for the signing of the Treaty of Lisbon, which ended the Portuguese Restoration War and established formal peace between Portugal and Spain.

In 2012, as part of a city-wide reform aimed at streamlining local government, Santiago was merged with eleven other historic parishes (including Castelo, Sé, and São Miguel) to form the central district of Santa Maria Maior.

== Main sites ==
Despite its small geographic size, Santiago contains several of Lisbon's most important cultural and architectural landmarks:

- Santiago Church (Igreja de Santiago): Originally built in the 12th century, the church has been reconstructed several times, notably after the 1755 Lisbon earthquake. According to local historical tradition, the explorer Christopher Columbus married the Portuguese noblewoman Filipa Moniz Perestrello in this church. It has been classified as a Building of Public Interest since 1996.
- Roman Theatre of Lisbon (Teatro Romano): The remains of a 1st-century AD Roman theatre, discovered in 1798, providing significant insight into the ancient city of Felicitas Iulia Olisipo.
- Azurara Palace (Palácio Azurara): An 18th-century aristocratic palace that now houses the Museum of Portuguese Decorative Arts (Museu de Artes Decorativas) and the Ricardo do Espírito Santo Silva Foundation.
- Belmonte Palace (Palácio Belmonte): A historic noble residence integrated into the walls of the Castelo de São Jorge.

== Demographics ==
At the time of the 2011 census, the year prior to its administrative dissolution, the parish had a total population of 619 inhabitants. With a total land area of only 0.06 km², it was one of the smallest and most densely built-up administrative units in Lisbon.

== Bibliography ==
- Rodrigues, M. J. M. (1997). Lisboa: A Cidade e os Seus Bairros (in Portuguese). Lisbon: Livros Horizonte.
