= São Francisco Xavier, Lisbon =

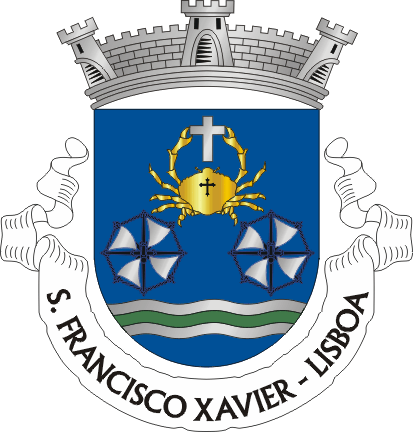
- Coat of arms

- Location within Portugal
- Coordinates: 38°42′26″N 9°13′2″W
- Country: Portugal
- District: Lisbon
- Municipality: Lisbon
- Established: 7/02/1959

Area
  - Total: 2.1 km^{2} (0.81 sq mi)

Population (2011)
  - Total: 8,020
  - Density: 3,800/km^{2} (9,900/sq mi)
- Website: www.jf-sfxavier.pt

São Francisco Xavier (English: Saint Francis Xavier) is a former civil parish (freguesia) in the city and municipality of Lisbon, Portugal. It was created on February 7, 1959. At the administrative reorganization of Lisbon on 8 December 2012 it merged with the former parish of Santa Maria de Belém, thus creating the new Belém parish.

== Main sites ==
- Santana Windmills
- São Jerónimo Chapel
