= Anjos =

Former civil parish in Lisbon, Portugal

Coordinates: 38.42°N 9.08°W

Building on Avenida Almirante Reis

Anjos is a former parish (freguesia) in the municipality of Lisbon, Portugal. At the administrative reorganization of Lisbon on 8 December 2012 it became part of the parish Arroios. It was created in 1564. It has a total area of 0.48 km^{2} and total population of 9,738 inhabitants (2001); density: 20,372.4 inhabitants/km^{2}.
