= São João, Lisbon =

Civil parish in Lisboa, Portugal

São João
- Civil parish
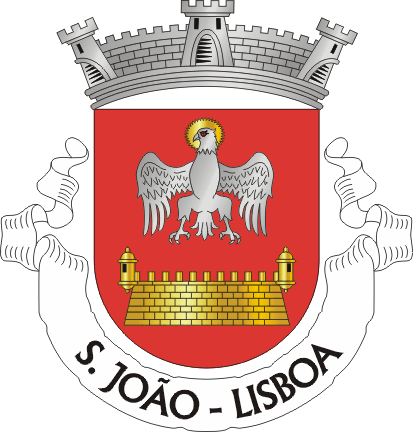
- Coat of arms
- Interactive map of São João
- Location in Portugal
- Coordinates: 38°43′44″N 9°7′22″W
- Country: Portugal
- Region: Lisbon
- Metropolitan area: Lisbon
- District: Lisbon
- Municipality: Lisbon
- Disbanded: 2012

Area
  - Total: 1.56 km^{2} (0.60 sq mi)

Population (2001)
  - Total: 17,073
  - Density: 10,900/km^{2} (28,300/sq mi)
- Time zone: UTC+00:00 (WET)
  - Summer (DST): UTC+01:00 (WEST)
- Website: http://www.jf-saojoao.pt/

São João (English: Saint John) was a Portuguese parish (freguesia) in the municipality of Lisbon. It was created on February 7, 1959, but with the 2012 Administrative Reform the parish merged with the Penha de França parish that kept its name.

== Main sites ==
- Santos-o-Novo Convent
- Santa Apolónia Fort
