= São Cristóvão e São Lourenço, Lisbon =

Former civil parish in Lisbon, Portugal

Coordinates: 38.42°N 9.08°W

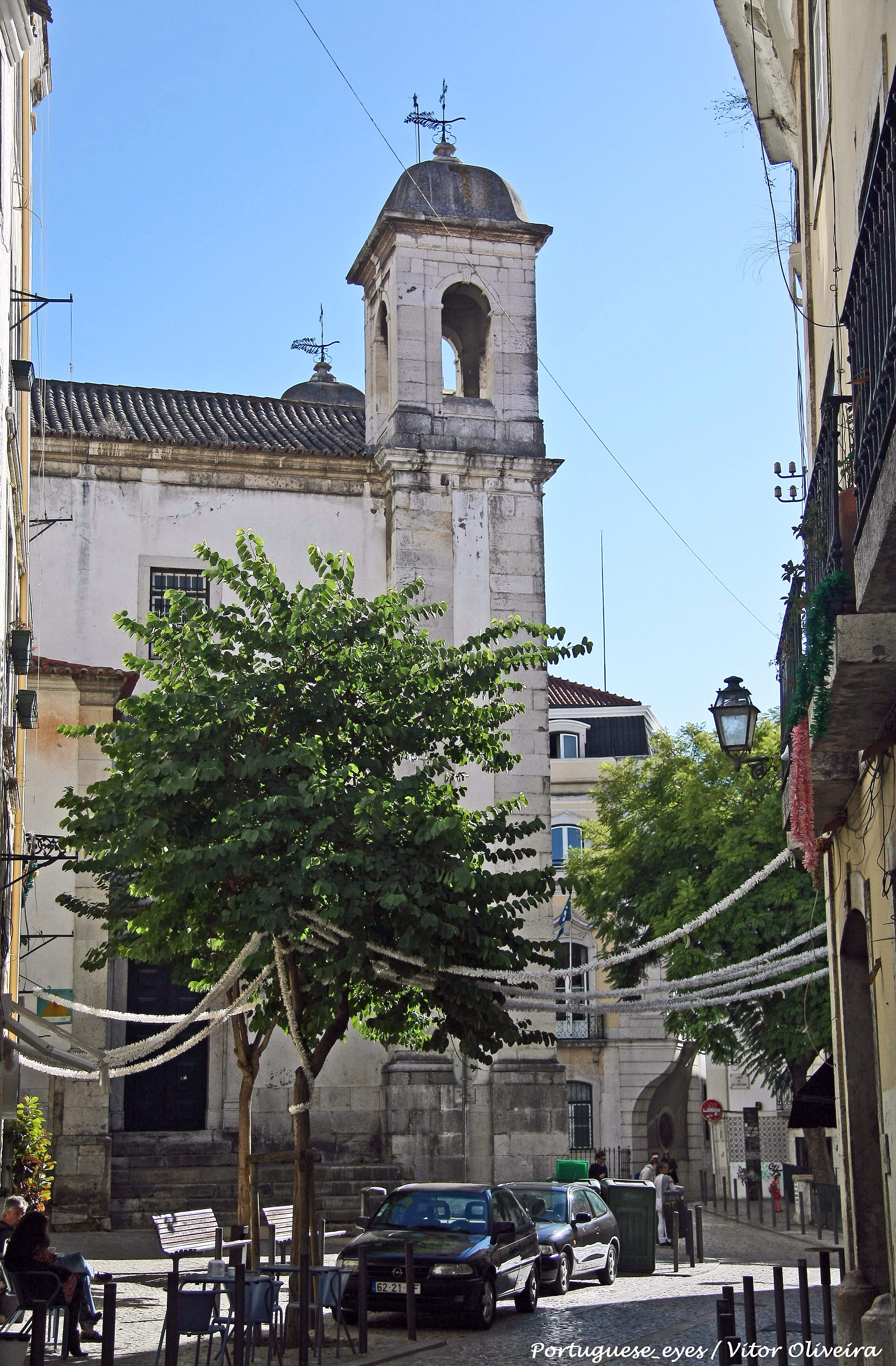

São Cristóvão e São Lourenço (English: Saint Christopher and Saint Lawrence) is a former parish (freguesia) in the municipality of Lisbon, Portugal. It had a total area of 0.08 km^{2} and total population of 1,612 inhabitants (2001); density: 20,935.1 inhabitants/km^{2}. At the administrative reorganization of Lisbon on 8 December 2012 it became part of the parish Santa Maria Maior.

== Main sites ==
- São Cristovão Church
- Marquês de Tancos Palace
