= Sacramento, Lisbon =

Coordinates: 38°42′44″N 9°08′24″W

Sacramento is a former civil parish (freguesia) in the city and municipality of Lisbon, Portugal. It had a total area of 0.08 km^{2} and total population of 880 inhabitants (2001); density: 18,864.2 inhabitants/km^{2}. At the administrative reorganization of Lisbon on 8 December 2012 it became part of the parish Santa Maria Maior.

== Main sites ==
- São Roque Church
- Carmo Convent
