= Mártires, Lisbon =

Mártires
- Civil parish
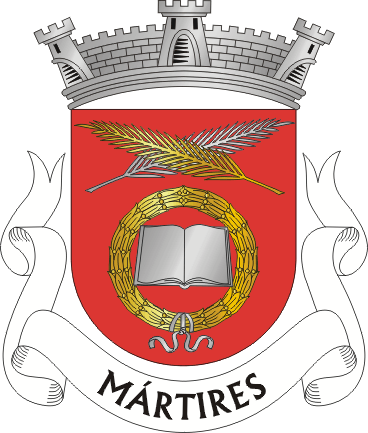
- Coat of arms

- Location in Portugal
- Coordinates: 38.709°N 9.142°W
- Country: Portugal
- Region: Lisbon
- Metropolitan area: Lisbon
- District: Lisbon
- Municipality: Lisbon
- Disbanded: 2012

Area
  - Total: 0.10 km^{2} (0.039 sq mi)

Population (2001)
  - Total: 341
  - Density: 3,400/km^{2} (8,800/sq mi)
- Time zone: UTC+00:00 (WET)
  - Summer (DST): UTC+01:00 (WEST)
- Website: www.jf-martires.pt

Mártires (Portuguese pronunciation: [ˈmaɾtiɾɨʃ]) is a former civil parish (freguesia) in the city and municipality of Lisbon, Portugal. It was one of the oldest civil parishes of Lisbon, dated from 1147. It had less than 400 inhabitants, and its area was 0.10 km^{2}. At the administrative reorganization of Lisbon on 8 December 2012 it became part of the parish Santa Maria Maior.

== Monuments ==
- Teatro Nacional de São Carlos (1793)
- Basílica de Nossa Senhora dos Mártires (século XVIII) made by the architect Reynaldo dos Santos.
- Convento de São Francisco da Cidade (today Faculdade de Belas Artes de Lisboa).
- Convento da Boa Hora, where was installed a court in the 19th century .
- Edifício na Rua Garret, onde se encontra instalada a Casa Gardénia
- Sculpture of Fernando Pessoa in Largo do Chiado
