= São Nicolau, Lisbon =

São Nicolau
- Civil parish
- Location in Portugal
- Coordinates: 38.708°N 9.137°W
- Country: Portugal
- Region: Lisbon
- Metropolitan area: Lisbon
- District: Lisbon
- Municipality: Lisbon
- Disbanded: 2012

Area
  - Total: 0.25 km^{2} (0.10 sq mi)

Population (2001)
  - Total: 1,175
  - Density: 4,700/km^{2} (12,000/sq mi)
- Time zone: UTC+00:00 (WET)
  - Summer (DST): UTC+01:00 (WEST)

São Nicolau (Portuguese pronunciation: [sɐ̃w nikuˈlaw]) (English: Saint Nicholas) is a former civil parish (freguesia) in the city and municipality of Lisbon, Portugal. It was 0.25 km² in area with 1,175 inhabitants as of 2001. At the administrative reorganization of Lisbon on 8 December 2012 it became part of the parish Santa Maria Maior.
