= Nossa Senhora de Fátima, Lisbon =

Coordinates: 38°44′21″N 9°9′3″W

Nossa Senhora de Fátima (English: Our Lady of Fátima) was a Portuguese parish (freguesia) in the municipality of Lisbon. It had a total area of 1.87 km^{2} and total population of 27.111 inhabitants (2001); density: 14,528.9 inhabitants/km^{2}. It was created on February 7, 1959. With the 2012 Administrative Reform, the former Nossa Senhora de Fátima parish merged with the São Sebastião da Pedreira parish into a new parish named Avenidas Novas.

== Main sites ==
- Campo Pequeno bullring
- Nossa Senhora do Rosário de Fátima Church
- Museu Calouste Gulbenkian
- Galveias Palace
