= Madalena, Lisbon =

Madalena
- Civil parish
- Location in Portugal
- Coordinates: 38.71°N 9.13472°W
- Country: Portugal
- Region: Lisbon
- Metropolitan area: Lisbon
- District: Lisbon
- Municipality: Lisbon
- Disbanded: 8 December 2012

Area
  - Total: 0.11 km^{2} (0.04 sq mi)

Population (2001)
  - Total: 380
  - Density: 3,500/km^{2} (8,900/sq mi)
- Time zone: UTC+00:00 (WET)
  - Summer (DST): UTC+01:00 (WEST)

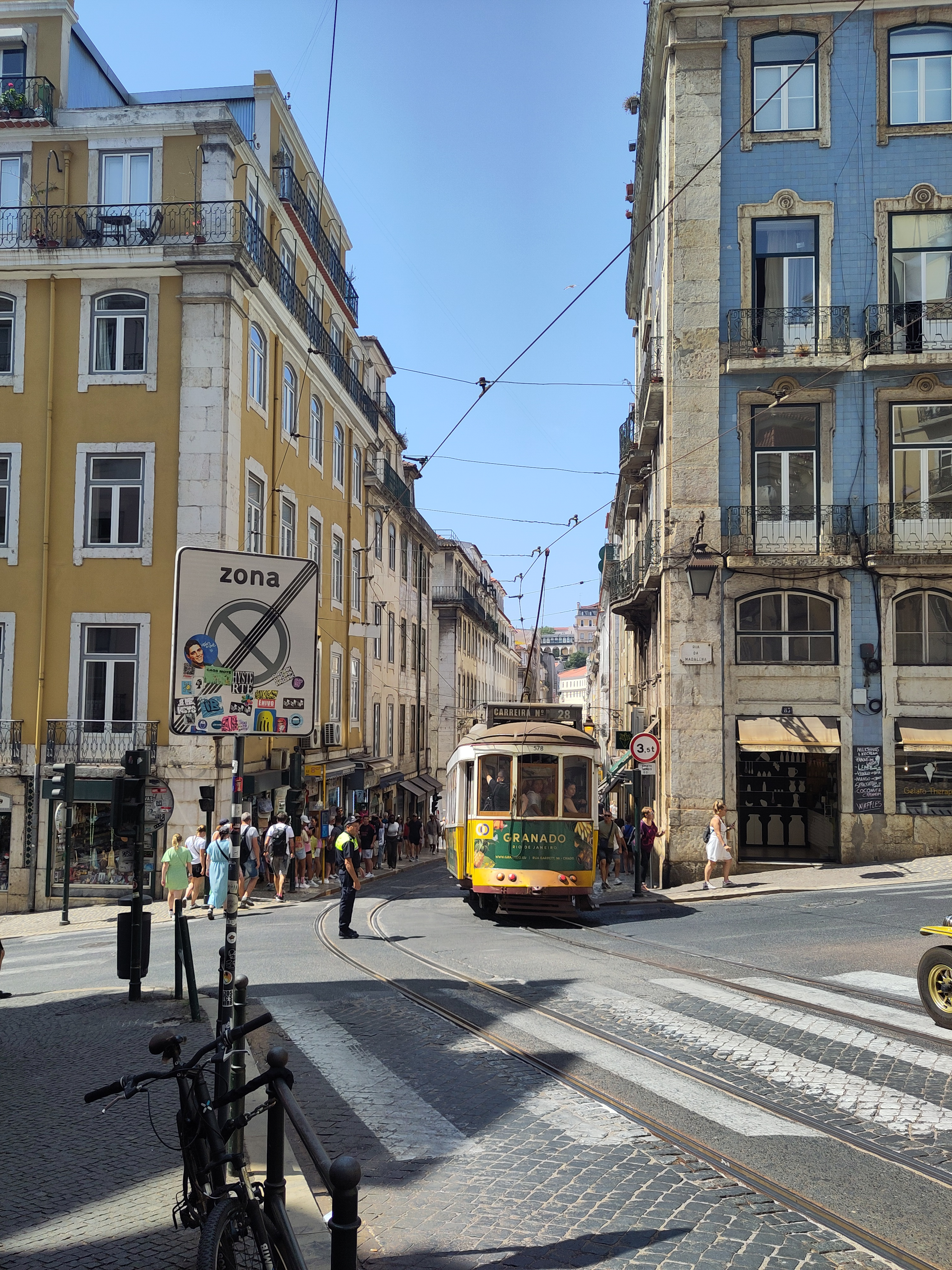

Madalena (English: Magdalene) is a former civil parish (freguesia) in the city and municipality of Lisbon, Portugal. It has a total area of 0.11 km^{2} and total population of 380 inhabitants (2001); density: 3,423 inhabitants/km^{2}. At the administrative reorganization of Lisbon on 8 December 2012 it became part of the parish Santa Maria Maior.

== People ==
- Manuel Luís Goucha (born 1954, television presenter)

== Main sites ==
- Praça do Comércio
