= Socorro, Lisbon =

Socorro
- Civil parish
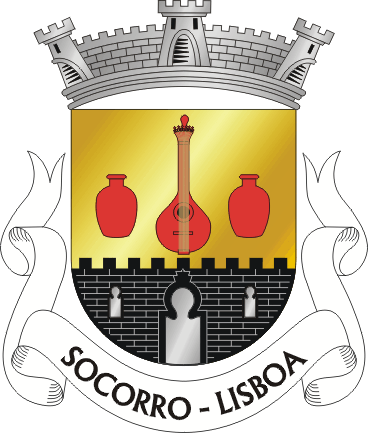
- Coat of arms

- Location in Portugal
- Coordinates: 38.42°N 9.08°W
- Country: Portugal
- Region: Lisbon
- Metropolitan area: Lisbon
- District: Lisbon
- Municipality: Lisbon
- Disbanded: 2012

Area
  - Total: 0.11 km^{2} (0.04 sq mi)

Population (2001)
  - Total: 2,676
  - Density: 24,000/km^{2} (63,000/sq mi)
- Time zone: UTC+00:00 (WET)
  - Summer (DST): UTC+01:00 (WEST)

Socorro (English: Succour) is a former parish (freguesia) in the municipality of Lisbon, Portugal. The local area is also designated as Martim Moniz. At the administrative reorganization of Lisbon on 8 December 2012 it became part of the parish Santa Maria Maior.

== Main sites ==
- Menino de Deus Church
