= São Miguel, Lisbon =

Former civil parish in Lisbon, Portugal

Coordinates: 38.42°N 9.07°W

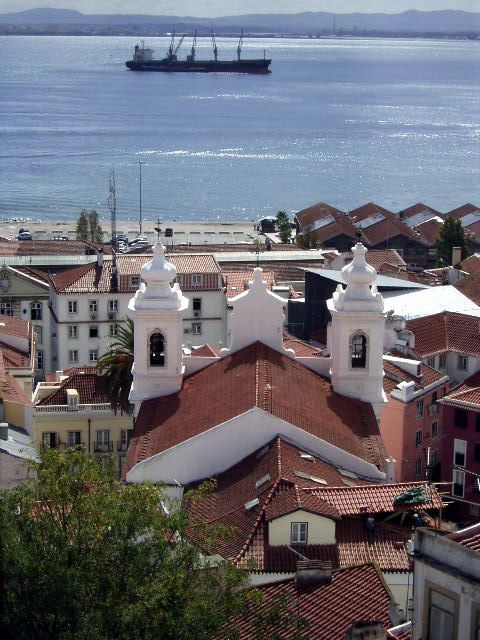
São Miguel Church and parish seen from the Miradouro Santa Luzia

São Miguel (English: Saint Michael) is a former parish (freguesia) in the municipality of Lisbon, Portugal. It had a total area of 0.06 km^{2} and total population of 1,777 inhabitants (2001); density: 30,638 inhabitants/km^{2}. It was created in 1180 near the Castle of São Jorge site. At the administrative reorganization of Lisbon on 8 December 2012 it became part of the parish Santa Maria Maior.

== Main sites ==
- São Miguel Church
- Santa Luzia Church
