= Sé, Lisbon =

Former civil parish in Lisbon, Portugal

Coordinates: 38.42°N 9.07°W

Sé (English: See) is a former civil parish (freguesia) in the city and municipality of Lisbon, Portugal. It had a total area of 0.12 km^{2} and total population of 1,160 inhabitants (2001); density: 9,586.8 inhabitants/km^{2}. It was created as a parish in 1150. At the administrative reorganization of Lisbon on 8 December 2012 it became part of the parish Santa Maria Maior.

== Main sites ==
- Lisbon Cathedral
- Casa dos Bicos
- Santo António Church
