= Castelo, Lisbon =

Castelo
- Civil parish
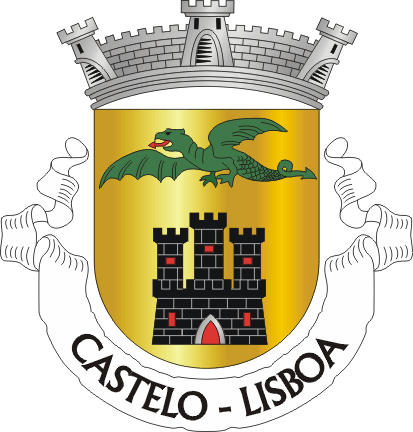
- Coat of arms

- Location in Portugal
- Coordinates: 38.42°N 9.08°W
- Country: Portugal
- Region: Lisbon
- Metropolitan area: Lisbon
- District: Lisbon
- Municipality: Lisbon
- Disbanded: 2012

Area
  - Total: 0.05 km^{2} (0.02 sq mi)

Population (2001)
  - Total: 587
  - Density: 12,000/km^{2} (30,000/sq mi)
- Time zone: UTC+00:00 (WET)
  - Summer (DST): UTC+01:00 (WEST)

Castelo (English: Castle) is a former parish (freguesia) in the municipality of Lisbon, Portugal. It is one of the oldest parishes of Lisbon dated from 1147. At the administrative reorganization of Lisbon on 8 December 2012 it became part of the parish Santa Maria Maior.

== Main sites ==
- Castle of São Jorge
