= 1997 Lisbon local election =

1997 Lisbon local elections
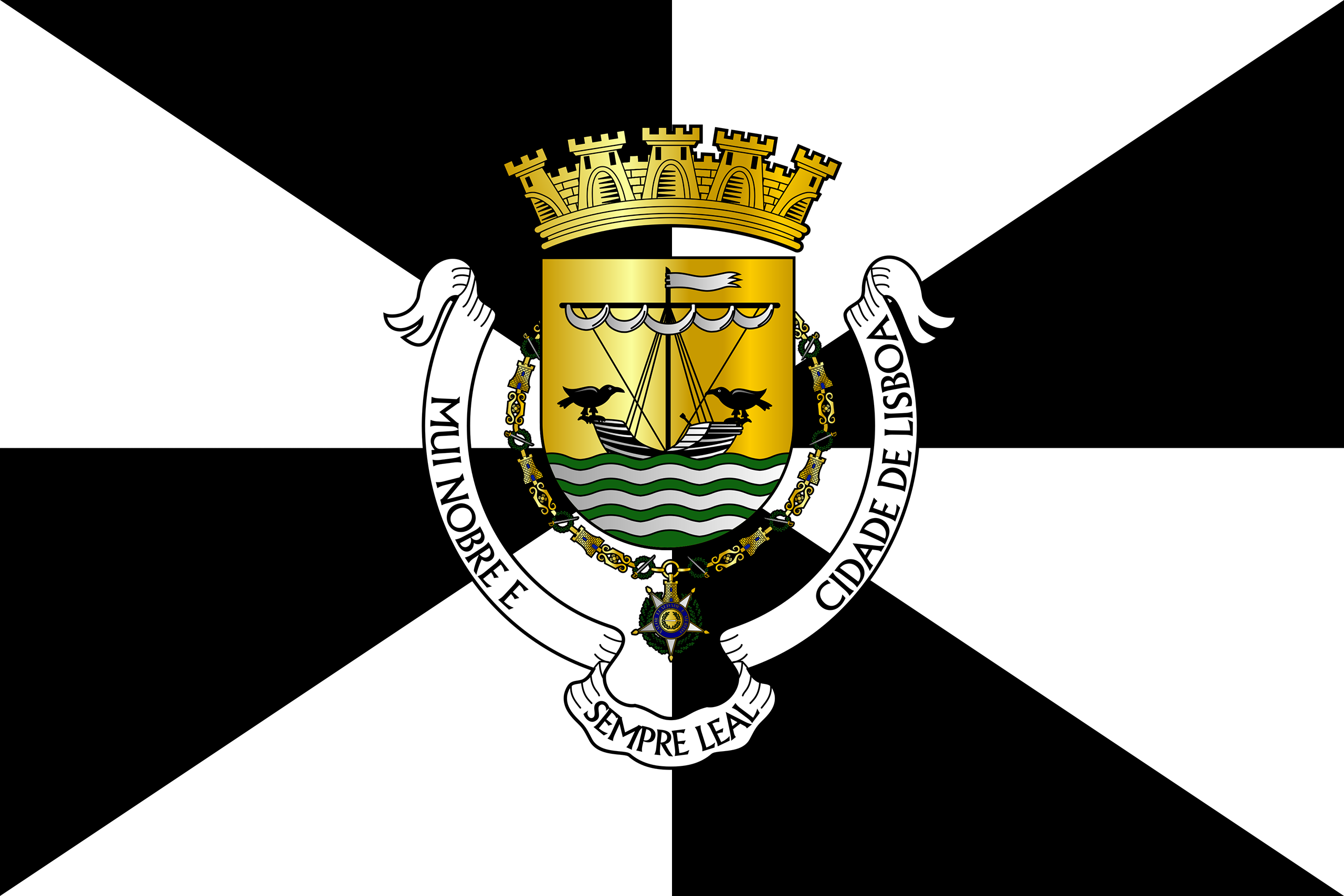
- 14 December 1997

All 17 Councillors in the Lisbon City Council 9 seats needed for a majority
- Turnout: 48.3% ▼5.2 pp
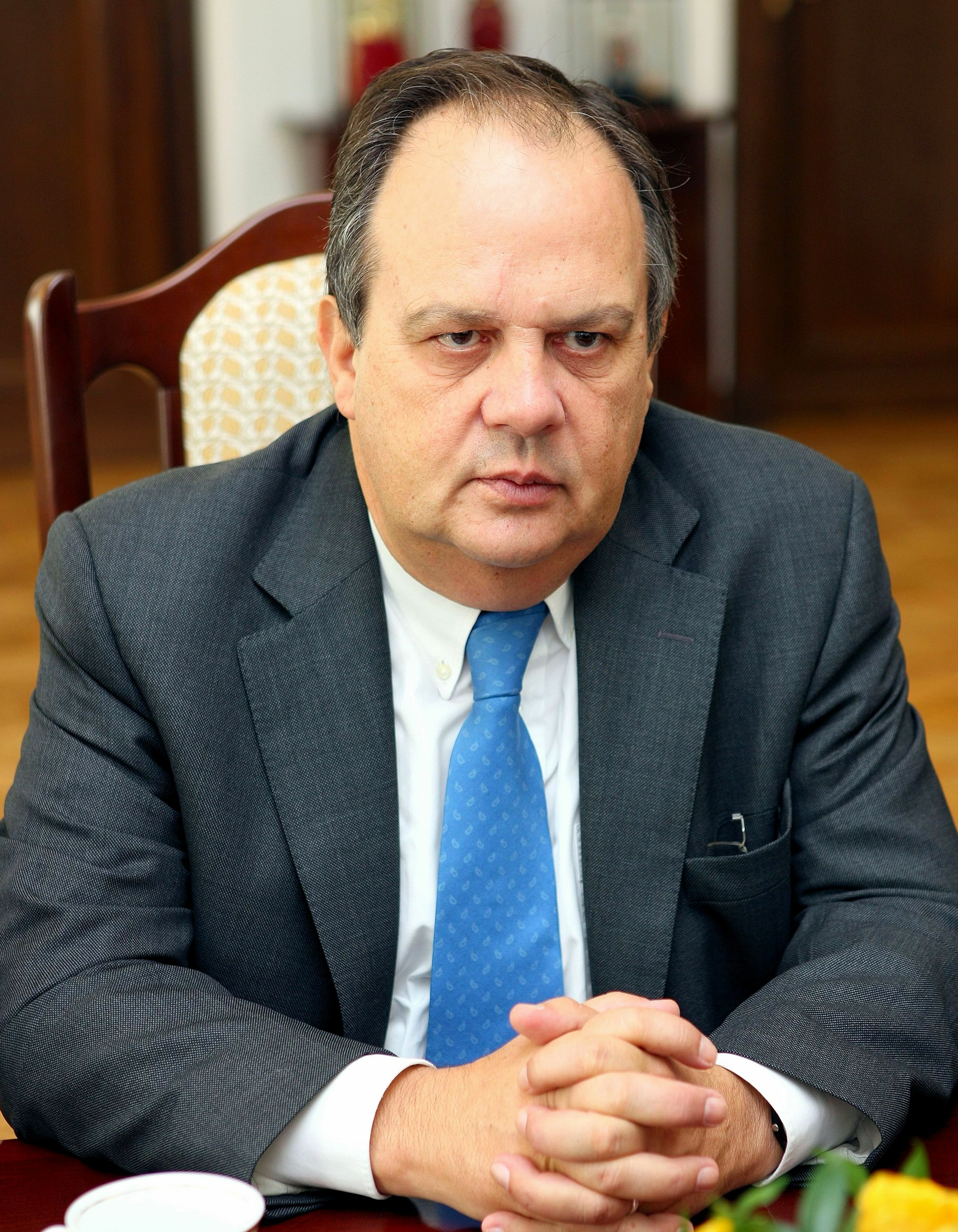

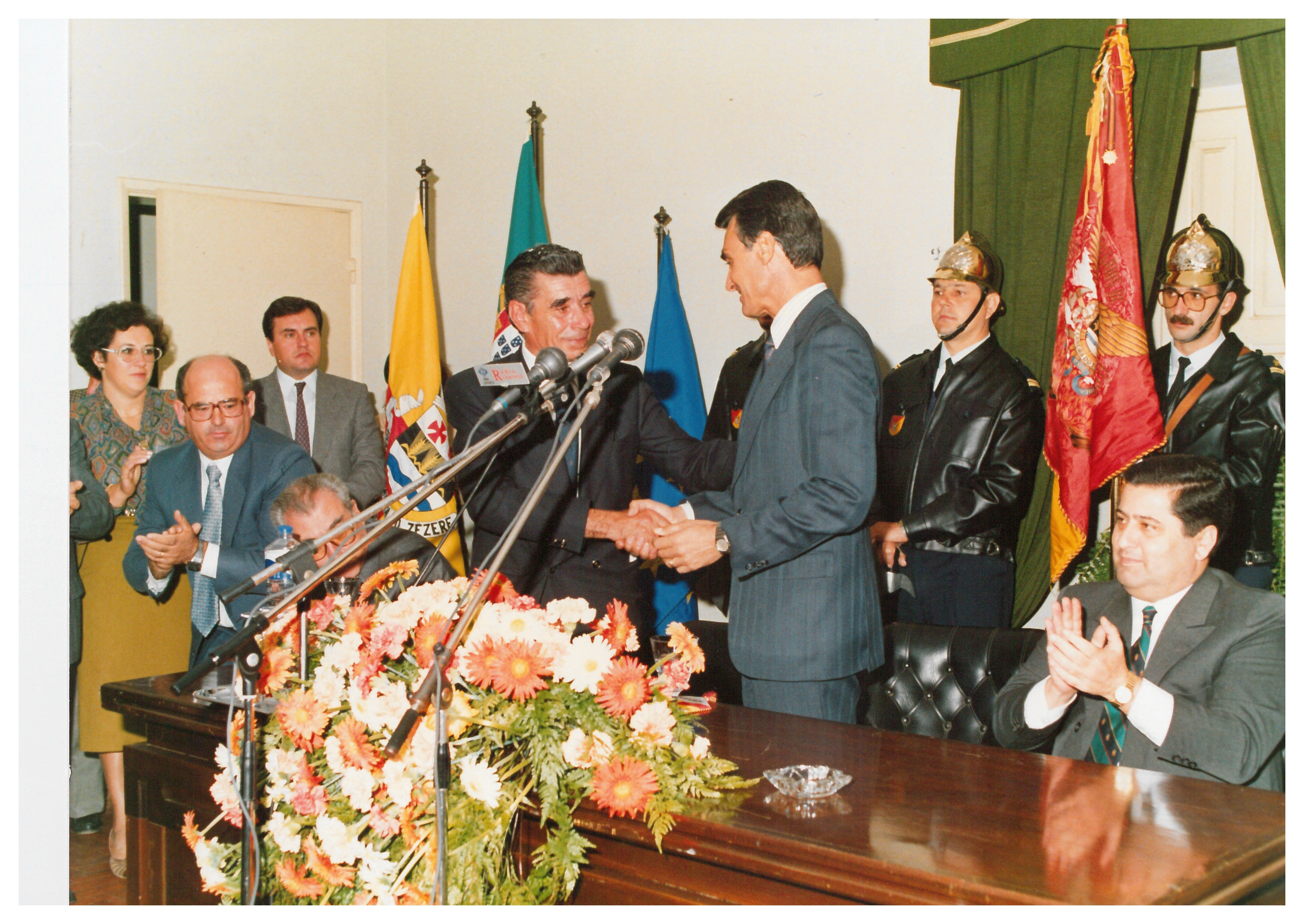
	First party	Second party
Leader	João Soares	Joaquim Ferreira do Amaral
Party	PS	PSD
Alliance	More Lisbon (Note: Coalition with PS, PCP, PEV and UDP.)	LisBoa Cidade (Note: Coalition with PPD/PSD and CDS–PP.)
Last election	11 seats, 56.7%	6 seats, 34.1% (Note: Sum of votes and seats of the PSD and the CDS–PP in the 1993 election. PSD: 26.3%, 5 seats; CDS–PP: 7.8%, 1 seat.)
Seats won	10	7
Seat change	▼1	▲1
Popular vote	165,008	124,859
Percentage	51.9%	39.3%
Swing	▼4.8 pp	▲5.2 pp
Mayor before election
João Soares
PS
Elected Mayor
João Soares
PS

The 1997 Lisbon local election was held on 14 December 1997 to elect the members of the Lisbon City Council.

Incumbent mayor João Soares, who replaced Jorge Sampaio in November 1995, won a first full term in a coalition with the Portuguese Communist Party, defeating Joaquim Ferreira do Amaral, the PSD/CDS coalition candidate.

== Background ==
In the 1993 election, the coalition between the Socialist Party, the Communist Party, the Ecologist Party "The Greens", the Revolutionary Socialist Party and the People's Democratic Union, led by the incumbent mayor Jorge Sampaio, won an absolute majority, achieving 56.7% of the votes and 11 seats in the city council. They defeated the Social Democratic Party, led by José Macário Correia, who got 26.3% of the votes and 5 seats; and the People's Party, led by Pedro Feist, who got 7.8% of the votes and 1 seat.

Jorge Sampaio resigned as Mayor of Lisbon on 15 November 1995 in order to run in the 1996 presidential election, which he would end up winning. He was replaced by João Soares, who was the son of President Mário Soares.

== Electoral system ==
Each party or coalition must present a list of candidates. The winner of the most voted list for the municipal council is automatically elected mayor, similar to first-past-the-post (FPTP). The lists are closed and the seats in each municipality are apportioned according to the D'Hondt method.

== Parties and candidates ==
Party/Coalition		Political position	Candidate	1993 result	
Party/Coalition		Political position	Candidate	Votes (%)	Seats
ML	More Lisbon; Mais Lisboa PS, PCP, PEV, UDP	Centre-left to left-wing	João Soares	56.7%	11 / 17
LBC	LisGood City; LisBoa Cidade PPD/PSD, CDS–PP	Centre-right to right-wing	Joaquim Ferreira do Amaral	34.1%	6 / 17
PCTP	Portuguese Workers' Communist Party; Partido Comunista dos Trabalhadores Portugueses	Far-left	—N/a	1.2%	0 / 17
EUPL	United Left for Lisbon; Esquerdas Unidas por Lisboa PSR, PXXI	Left-wing to far-left	Francisco Louçã	—N/a	0 / 17

== Opinion polling ==
Polling firm/Link	Fieldwork date	Sample size	PS PCP PEV UDP	PSD CDS	O	Lead
1997 local election	14 Dec 1997	—N/a	51.9; 10	39.3; 7	8.8; 0	12.6
Euroexpansão	5–7 Jun 1995	357	41	28	31	13
1993 local election	14 Dec 1997	—N/a	56.7; 11	34.1; 6	9.2; 0	22.6

== Results ==
=== Municipal Council ===
Summary of the 14 December 1997 Lisbon City Council election results
Graph of the party split among 17 seats.
Parties	Votes	%	±pp swing	Councillors	
Parties	Votes	%	±pp swing	Total	±
PS / PCP / PEV / UDP	165,008	51.88	▼4.8	10	▼1
Social Democratic / People's	124,859	39.26	▲5.2	7	▲1
PSR / PXXI	8,363	2.63	—N/a	0	—N/a
Portuguese Workers' Communist	6,068	1.91	▲0.7	0	0
Total valid	304,298	95.68	▼0.8	17	0
Blank ballots	6,780	2.13	0.0		
Invalid ballots	6,999	2.20	▲0.8		
Total	318,055	100.00			
Registered voters/turnout	658,700	48.29	▼5.2		
Source: Lisbon 1997 election results

=== Municipal Assembly ===
Summary of the 14 December 1997 Lisbon City Council election results
Graph of the party split among 54 seats.
Parties	Votes	%	±pp swing	Seats	
Parties	Votes	%	±pp swing	Total	±
PS / PCP / PEV / UDP	163,378	51.37	▼3.6	30	▼2
Social Democratic / People's	124,434	39.13	▲2.8	22	▲1
PSR / PXXI	9,809	3.08	—N/a	1	—N/a
Portuguese Workers' Communist	6,341	1.99	▲0.8	1	▲1
Total valid	303,962	95.57	▼1.0	54	0
Blank ballots	7,130	2.24	▲0.1		
Invalid ballots	6,929	2.18	▲0.9		
Total	318,021	100.00			
Registered voters/turnout	658,700	48.28	▼5.2		
Source: Lisbon 1997 election results

=== Parish Assemblies ===
Results of the 14 December 1997 Lisbon Parish Assembly elections
Parish	%	S	%	S	%	S	%	S	Total S
Parish	PS/CDU/UDP		PSD/CDS		IND		PCTP		Total S
Ajuda	67.8	14	26.9	5					19
Alcântara	63.5	13	32.2	6					19
Alto do Pina	40.0	5	54.2	8					13
Alvalade	33.7	5	48.6	7	13.4	1			13
Ameixoeira	57.0	8	37.4	5					13
Anjos	48.1	7	45.6	6					13
Beato	56.6	8	32.4	5			5.7	-	13
Benfica	54.6	12	40.7	9					21
Campo Grande	51.6	7	44.2	6					13
Campolide	58.8	12	36.2	7					19
Carnide	59.4	8	34.3	5					13
Castelo	74.2	6	18.0	1					7
Charneca	54.2	8	37.9	5					13
Coração de Jesus	46.8	6	48.4	7					13
Encarnação	58.4	8	36.3	5					13
Graça	56.4	8	37.9	5					13
Lapa	42.7	6	54.0	7					13
Lumiar	53.7	11	41.6	8					19
Madalena	52.6	4	44.1	3					7
Mártires	47.3	3	49.1	4					7
Marvila	65.9	14	22.8	5			6.0	1	20
Mercês	58.0	8	36.5	5					13
Nossa Senhora de Fátima	42.8	9	50.4	10			2.4	-	19
Pena	53.9	7	40.6	6					13
Penha de França	54.0	7	40.9	6					13
Prazeres	58.9	8	36.4	5					13
Sacramento	45.8	5	27.5	3	18.3	1			9
Santa Catarina	58.2	8	36.2	5					13
Santa Engrácia	53.5	8	40.0	5					13
Santa Isabel	47.0	6	48.4	7					13
Santa Justa	58.3	6	35.8	3					9
Santa Maria de Belém	53.5	7	42.1	6					13
Santa Maria dos Olivais	59.7	15	34.9	9					24
Santiago	62.7	6	33.9	3					9
Santo Condestável	55.4	11	37.1	8			2.6	-	19
Santo Estêvão	66.7	7	25.9	2					9
Santos-o-Velho	59.5	8	37.5	5					13
São Cristóvão e São Lourenço	57.6	6	36.5	3					9
São Domingos de Benfica	49.0	10	47.0	9					19
São Francisco Xavier	38.9	5	57.3	8					13
São João	55.9	11	38.1	8					19
São João de Brito	39.8	5	56.2	8					13
São João de Deus	37.3	5	58.4	8					13
São Jorge de Arroios	46.8	9	48.5	10					19
São José	51.9	7	44.8	6					13
São Mamede	46.4	6	49.7	7					13
São Miguel	65.2	7	23.9	2			4.1	-	9
São Nicolau	56.5	6	36.2	3					9
São Paulo	57.4	6	37.0	3					9
São Sebastião da Pedreira	39.2	5	57.7	8					13
Santo Vicente de Fora	64.5	9	30.1	4					13
Sé	55.5	5	38.8	4					9
Socorro	54.9	8	39.3	5					13
Total	53.4	409	40.7	303	0.3	2	0.6	1	715
Source: Election Results
