= List of freguesias of Portugal: L =

The freguesias (civil parishes) of Portugal are listed in by municipality according to the following format:

- concelho
  - freguesias

== Lagoa (Algarve) ==
- Carvoeiro
- Estômbar
- Ferragudo
- Lagoa
- Parchal
- Porches

== Lagoa (Azores) ==
- Água de Pau
- Cabouco
- Nossa Senhora do Rosário
- Santa Cruz
- Ribeira Chã

== Lagos ==
- Bensafrim e Barão de São João
- São Gonçalo de Lagos
- Luz
- Odiáxere

== Lajes das Flores (Azores) ==
- Fajã Grande
- Fajãzinha
- Fazenda
- Lajedo
- Lajes
- Lomba
- Mosteiro

== Lajes do Pico (Azores) ==
- Calheta de Nesquim
- Lajes
- Piedade
- Ribeiras
- Ribeirinha
- São João

== Lamego ==
- Avões
- Bigorne
- Britiande
- Cambres
- Cepões
- Ferreirim
- Ferreiros de Avões
- Figueira
- Lalim
- Lamego (Almacave)
- Lamego (Sé)
- Lazarim
- Magueija
- Meijinhos
- Melcões
- Parada do Bispo
- Penajóia
- Penude
- Pretarouca
- Samodães
- Sande
- Valdigem
- Várzea de Abrunhais
- Vila Nova de Souto d' El-Rei

== Leiria ==
- Amor
- Arrabal
- Azoia
- Bajouca
- Barosa
- Barreira
- Bidoeira de Cima
- Boa Vista
- Caranguejeira
- Carreira
- Carvide
- Chainça
- Coimbrão
- Colmeias
- Cortes
- Leiria
- Maceira
- Marrazes
- Memória
- Milagres
- Monte Real
- Monte Redondo
- Ortigosa
- Parceiros
- Pousos
- Regueira de Pontes
- Santa Catarina da Serra
- Santa Eufémia
- Souto da Carpalhosa

== Lisbon ==
=== Until 8 November 2012 ===
- Ajuda
- Alcântara
- Alto do Pina
- Alvalade
- Ameixoeira
- Anjos
- Beato
- Benfica
- Campo Grande
- Campolide
- Carnide
- Castelo
- Charneca
- Coração de Jesus
- Encarnação
- Graça
- Lapa
- Lumiar
- Madalena
- Mártires
- Marvila
- Mercês
- Nossa Senhora de Fátima
- Pena
- Penha de França
- Prazeres
- Sacramento
- Santa Catarina
- Santa Engrácia
- Santa Isabel
- Santa Justa
- Santa Maria de Belém
- Santa Maria dos Olivais
- Santiago
- Santo Condestável
- Santo Estêvão
- Santos-o-Velho
- São Cristóvão e São Lourenço
- São Domingos de Benfica
- São Francisco Xavier
- São João
- São João de Brito
- São João de Deus
- São Jorge de Arroios
- São José
- São Mamede
- São Miguel
- São Nicolau
- São Paulo
- São Sebastião da Pedreira
- São Vicente de Fora
- Sé
- Socorro

=== Effective 9 November 2012 ===
- Ajuda
- Alcântara
- Alvalade
- Areeiro
- Arroios
- Avenidas Novas
- Beato
- Belém
- Benfica
- Campo de Ourique
- Campolide
- Carnide
- Estrela
- Lumiar
- Marvila
- Misericórdia
- Olivais
- Parque das Nações
- Penha de França
- Santa Clara
- Santa Maria Maior
- Santo António
- São Domingos de Benfica
- São Vicente

== Loulé ==
- Almancil
- Alte
- Ameixial
- Benafim
- Boliqueime
- São Clemente
- São Sebastião
- Quarteira
- Querença
- Salir
- Tôr

== Loures ==
- Apelação
- Bobadela
- Bucelas
- Camarate
- Fanhões
- Frielas
- Loures
- Lousa
- Moscavide
- Portela
- Prior Velho
- Sacavém
- Santa Iria de Azoia
- Santo Antão do Tojal
- Santo António dos Cavaleiros
- São João da Talha
- São Julião do Tojal
- Unhos

== Lourinhã ==
- Atalaia
- Lourinhã
- Marteleira
- Miragaia
- Moita dos Ferreiros
- Moledo
- Reguengo Grande
- Ribamar
- Santa Bárbara (Lourinhã)
- São Bartolomeu dos Galegos
- Vimeiro

== Lousã ==
- Casal de Ermio
- Foz de Arouce
- Gândaras
- Lousã
- Serpins
- Vilarinho

== Lousada ==
- Alvarenga
- Aveleda
- Barrosas (Santo Estêvão)
- Boim
- Caíde de Rei
- Casais
- Cernadelo
- Covas
- Cristelos
- Figueiras
- Lodares
- Lousada (Santa Margarida)
- Lousada (São Miguel)
- Lustosa
- Macieira
- Meinedo
- Nespereira
- Nevogilde
- Nogueira
- Ordem
- Pias
- Silvares
- Sousela
- Torno
- Vilar do Torno e Alentém
