= 1993 Lisbon local election =

1993 Lisbon local elections
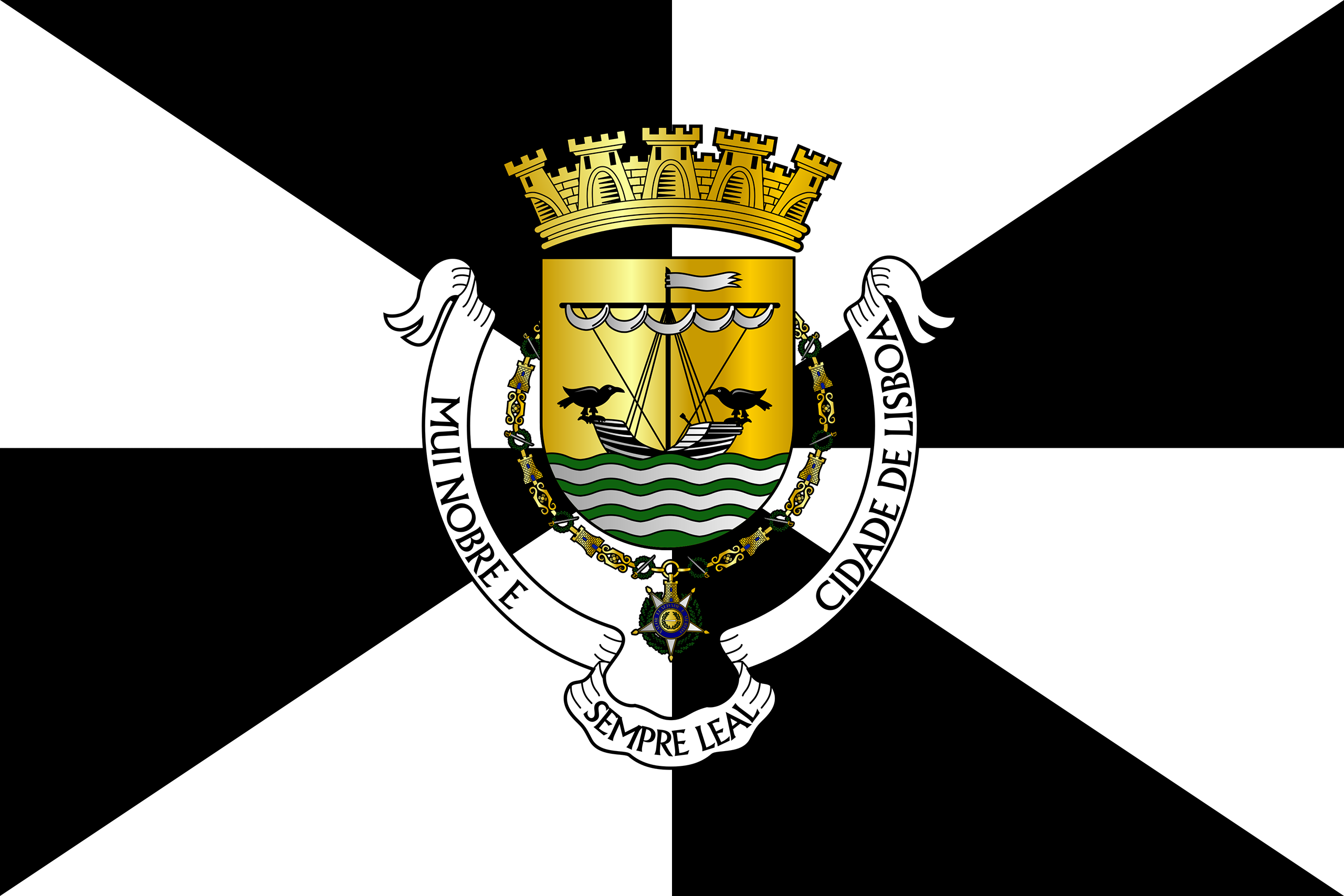
- 12 December 1993

All 17 Councillors in the Lisbon City Council 9 seats needed for a majority
- Turnout: 53.5% ▼1.3 pp
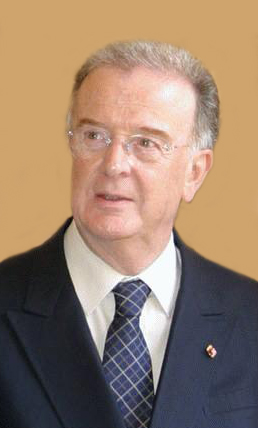

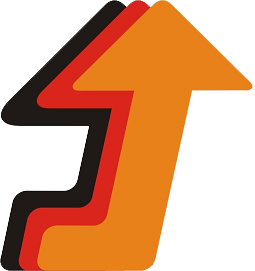

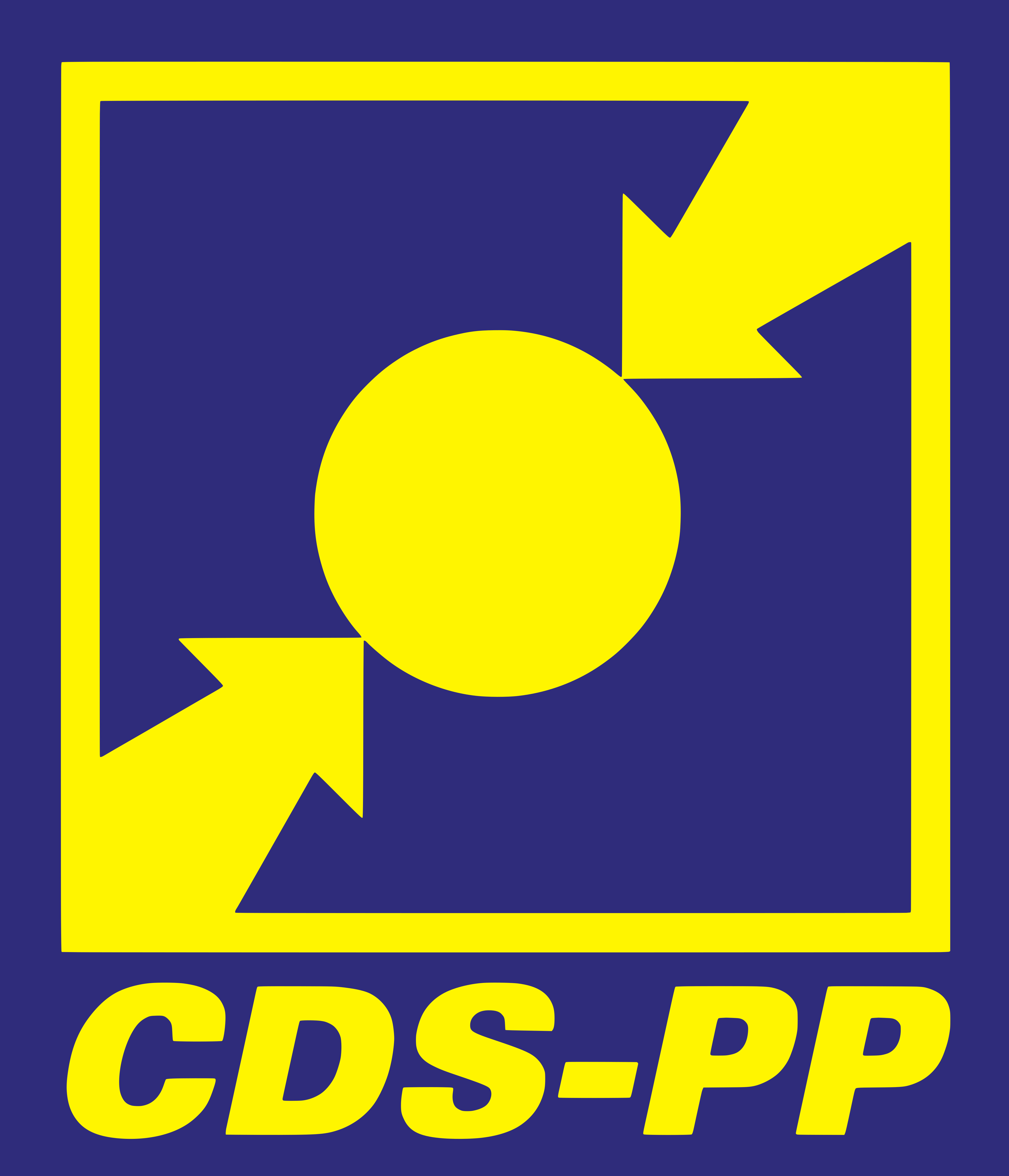
	First party	Second party	Third party
Leader	Jorge Sampaio	José Macário Correia	Pedro Feist
Party	PS	PSD	CDS
Alliance	With Lisbon (Note: Coalition with PS, PCP, PEV, PSR and UDP.)
Last election	9 seats, 49.1%	6 seats (VML) (Note: The Social Democratic Party (PSD), the People's Party (CDS–PP) and the People's Monarchist Party (PPM) contested the 1989 election in a coalition called Live Better in Lisbon (VML) and won a combined 42.1% of the vote and elected 8 councillors.)	2 seats (VML)
Seats won	11	5	1
Seat change	▲2	▼1	▼1
Popular vote	200,822	93,359	27,458
Percentage	56.7%	26.3%	7.8%
Swing	▲7.6 pp
Mayor before election
Jorge Sampaio
PS
Elected Mayor
Jorge Sampaio
PS

The 1993 Lisbon local election was held on 12 December 1993 to elect the members of the Lisbon City Council.

Incumbent mayor Jorge Sampaio, with his coalition between the Socialists and the Communists, won reelection by a landslide, defeating the Social Democratic candidate José Macário Correia, with 56.7% of the votes and 11 councillors, against the PSD's 26.3% of the votes and 5 councillors.

== Background ==
In the 1989 election, the coalition between the Socialist Party, the Communist Party, the Ecologist Party "The Greens" and the Portuguese Democratic Movement, led by PS leader Jorge Sampaio, won the election, achieving 49.1% of the votes and 9 seats in the city council. They defeated the coalition between the Social Democratic Party, the Democratic and Social Centre and the People's Monarchist Party, led by Marcelo Rebelo de Sousa, who got 42.1% of the votes and 8 seats.

== Electoral system ==
Each party or coalition must present a list of candidates. The winner of the most voted list for the municipal council is automatically elected mayor, similar to first-past-the-post (FPTP). The lists are closed and the seats in each municipality are apportioned according to the D'Hondt method.

== Parties and candidates ==
Party/Coalition		Political position	Candidate	1993 result	
Party/Coalition		Political position	Candidate	Votes (%)	Seats
CL	With Lisbon; Com Lisboa PS, PCP, PEV, PSR, UDP	Centre-left to left-wing	Jorge Sampaio	49.1%	9 / 17
PSD	Social Democratic Party; Partido Social Democrata	Centre-right	José Macário Correia	42.1%	6 / 17
CDS–PP	CDS – People's Party; CDS – Partido Popular	Right-wing	Pedro Feist	42.1%	2 / 17
PCTP	Portuguese Workers' Communist Party; Partido Comunista dos Trabalhadores Portugueses	Far-left	Carlos Paisana	1.2%	0 / 17
MPT	Earth Party; Partido da Terra	Centre-right	Gonçalo Ribeiro Telles	—N/a	0 / 17
PSN	National Solidarity Party; Partido da Solidariedade Nacional	Syncretic	João Santos	—N/a	0 / 17

== Results ==
=== Municipal Council ===
Summary of the 12 December 1993 Lisbon City Council election results
Graph of the party split among 17 seats.
Parties	Votes	%	±pp swing	Councillors	
Parties	Votes	%	±pp swing	Total	±
PS / PCP / PEV / PSR / UDP	200,822	56.66	▲7.6	11	▲2
Social Democratic	93,539	26.34	—N/a	5	▼1
People's	27,458	7.75	—N/a	1	▼1
Earth	12,993	3.67	—N/a	0	—N/a
Portuguese Workers' Communist	4,141	1.17	▼0.6	0	0
National Solidarity	3,179	0.90	—N/a	0	—N/a
Total valid	342,132	96.49	▲0.1	17	0
Blank ballots	7,492	2.11	▲0.2		
Invalid ballots	4,971	1.40	▼0.1		
Total	354,415	100.00			
Registered voters/turnout	662,797	53.49	▼1.3		
Source: Lisbon 1993 election results

=== Municipal Assembly ===
Summary of the 12 December 1993 Lisbon City Council election results
Graph of the party split among 54 seats.
Parties	Votes	%	±pp swing	Seats	
Parties	Votes	%	±pp swing	Total	±
PS / PCP / PEV / PSR / UDP	194,830	54.96	▲5.4	32	▲4
Social Democratic	98,817	27.88	—N/a	16	—N/a
People's	29,821	8.41	—N/a	5	—N/a
Earth	11,730	3.31	—N/a	1	—N/a
Portuguese Workers' Communist	4,355	1.23	▼0.2	0	0
People's Monarchist	2,685	0.76	—N/a	0	—N/a
Total valid	342,238	96.55	0.0	54	0
Blank ballots	7,449	2.10	▲0.2		
Invalid ballots	4,787	1.35	▼0.2		
Total	354,474	100.00			
Registered voters/turnout	662,797	53.48	▼1.3		
Source: Lisbon 1993 election results

=== Parish Assemblies ===
Results of the 12 December 1993 Lisbon Parish Assembly elections
Parish	%	S	%	S	%	S	%	S	%	S	Total S
Parish	PS/CDU/ PSR/UDP		PSD		CDS–PP		MPT		PCTP		Total S
Ajuda	60.8	14	22.1	4	4.9	1					19
Alcântara	63.5	13	25.5	5	6.5	1					19
Alto do Pina	43.2	6	43.8	6	9.3	1					13
Alvalade	41.6	6	40.8	5	14.7	2					13
Ameixoeira	62.7	9	27.2	4	5.9	-					13
Anjos	51.7	7	36.7	5	7.7	1					13
Beato	62.4	9	25.1	3	6.5	1			2.4	-	13
Benfica	58.9	14	27.7	6	6.7	1	2.9	-			21
Campo Grande	53.5	8	30.1	4	10.7	1					13
Campolide	61.4	13	26.1	5	8.5	1					19
Carnide	61.4	9	25.5	3	6.9	1					13
Castelo	72.3	6	16.6	1	3.7	-					7
Charneca	60.8	9	28.5	4	5.5	-					13
Coração de Jesus	47.3	7	37.4	5	11.7	1					13
Encarnação	58.3	8	29.1	4	7.9	1					13
Graça	59.3	9	28.4	4	5.8	-					13
Lapa	43.1	6	31.0	4	22.6	3					13
Lumiar	55.3	12	28.1	6	9.0	1	4.6	-			19
Madalena	57.3	5	27.5	2	9.3	-					7
Mártires	43.4	3	35.9	3	19.3	1					7
Marvila	64.8	14	18.4	4	5.2	1			4.6	1	20
Mercês	62.0	9	26.5	3	7.1	1					13
Nossa Senhora de Fátima	45.2	9	34.0	7	16.6	3			1.2	-	19
Pena	50.3	7	34.7	5	10.9	1					13
Penha de França	58.6	9	30.0	4	6.3	-					13
Prazeres	59.0	9	25.0	3	10.5	1			2.8	-	13
Sacramento	66.8	7	23.5	2	6.1	-					9
Santa Catarina	57.7	7	25.7	5	8.6	1					13
Santa Engrácia	59.1	8	29.7	4	7.0	1					13
Santa Isabel	49.9	7	34.4	5	12.5	1					13
Santa Justa	54.0	6	33.1	3	8.6	-					9
Santa Maria de Belém	57.1	8	26.4	4	11.1	1					13
Santa Maria dos Olivais	65.0	16	23.4	5	7.8	1					22
Santiago	61.0	6	25.3	2	9.1	1					9
Santo Condestável	56.7	12	29.9	6	8.1	1			1.7	-	19
Santo Estêvão	73.4	7	18.8	2	4.3	-					9
Santos-o-Velho	61.8	9	24.1	3	10.0	1					13
São Cristóvão e São Lourenço	54.4	6	35.3	3	6.8	-					9
São Domingos de Benfica	49.9	10	34.4	7	8.3	1	5.1	1			19
São Francisco Xavier	41.7	6	32.3	4	22.9	3					13
São João	61.7	13	27.4	5	7.3	1					19
São João de Brito	42.3	6	38.7	5	16.0	2					13
São João de Deus	39.2	6	37.4	5	15.9	2	4.9	-			13
São Jorge de Arroios	50.4	10	36.3	7	10.3	2					19
São José	56.6	8	30.9	4	9.3	1					13
São Mamede	46.7	6	35.0	5	14.8	2					13
São Miguel	73.7	8	17.5	1	4.5	-					9
São Nicolau	57.2	6	29.4	3	9.0	-					9
São Paulo	62.8	9	26.2	3	6.6	1					13
São Sebastião da Pedreira	41.1	5	34.7	5	21.6	3					13
Santo Vicente de Fora	63.0	10	26.6	3	6.1	-			2.8	-	13
Sé	57.1	6	31.0	3	9.0	-					9
Socorro	53.2	8	23.1	3	18.1	2					13
Total	56.2	446	29.2	216	9.4	53	0.8	1	0.5	1	717
Source: Election Results
