= Coalition PS/PCP =

Coalition PS/PCP Coligação PS/PCP
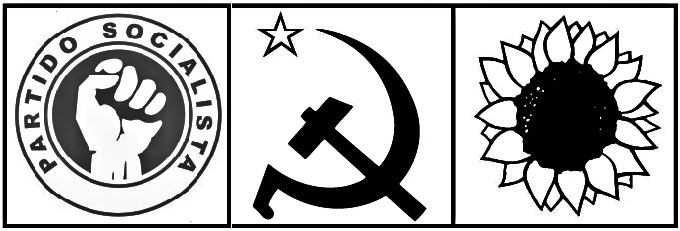
- Abbreviation: Various abbreviations
- Leader: Jorge Sampaio (1989–1995); João Soares (1995–2001)
- Founded: 1989
- Dissolved: 2001
- Ideology: Socialism; Ecologism
- Political position: Centre-left to left-wing
- Member parties: Socialist Party; Portuguese Communist Party; Ecologist Party "The Greens"; Portuguese Democratic Movement (1989); Popular Democratic Union (1993–1997); Revolutionary Socialist Party (1993)

The PS/PCP coalition (Portuguese: Coligação PS/PCP) was a socialist political and electoral alliance in Portugal formed by the Socialist Party (PS), the Portuguese Communist Party (PCP) and its allies.

It was commonly formed in Lisbon from 1989 to 2001, being led by Jorge Sampaio in the 1989 and 1993 local elections, and by João Soares in 1997 and 2001.

== History ==
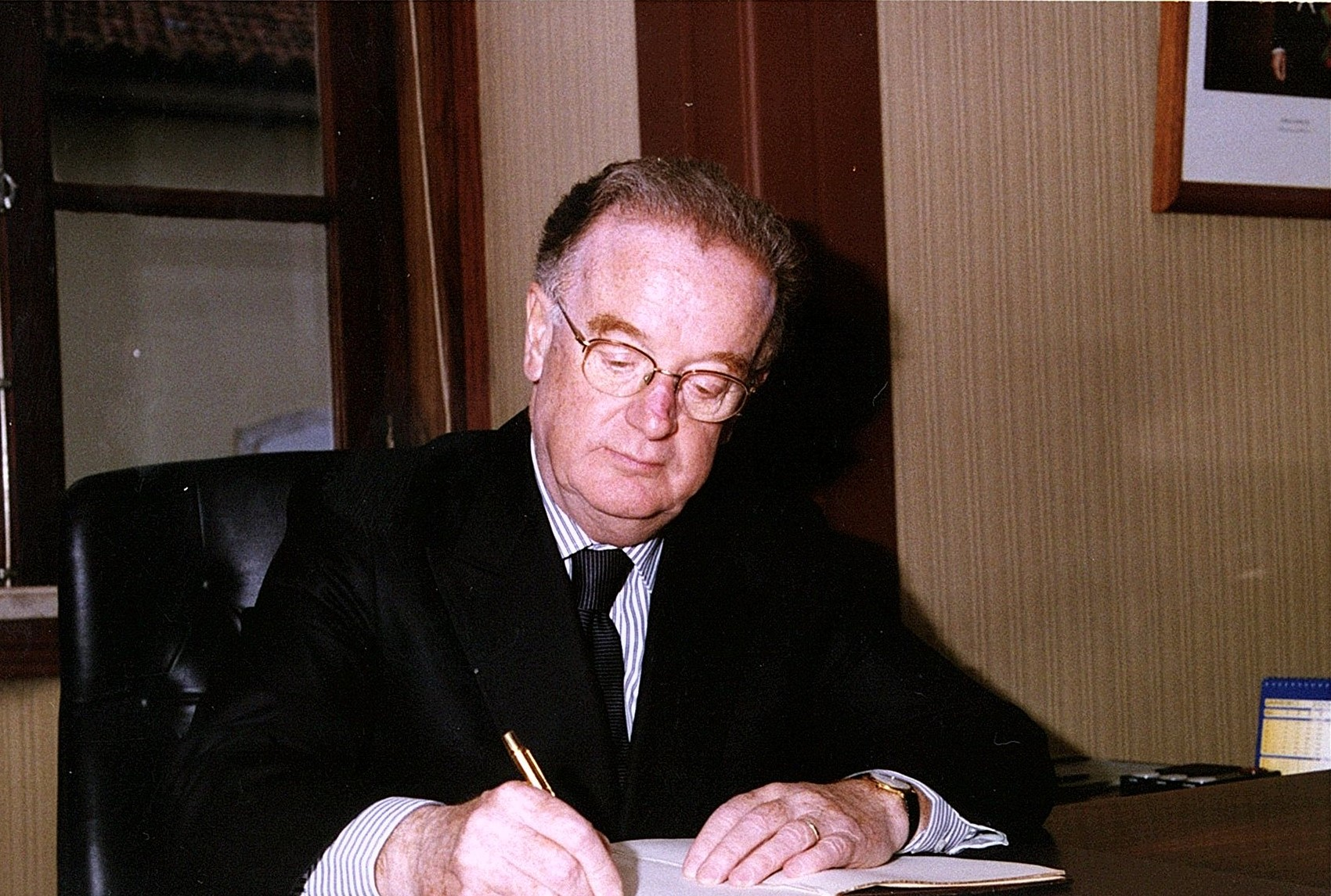
Jorge Sampaio, the founder of the first coalition between the Socialist Party and the Portuguese Communist Party.

In 1989, the Socialist Party, led by Jorge Sampaio, and the Portuguese Communist Party, led by Álvaro Cunhal, achieved an agreement to form a coalition to run in that year's local election in Lisbon, with Sampaio himself as the coalition's candidate. The objective of this coalition was to defeat the right wing CDS/PSD coalition, that had been in office since 1979 and whose candidate in 1989 was Marcelo Rebelo de Sousa.

The left-wing coalition defeated the right and Jorge Sampaio became the Mayor of Lisbon. He was re-elected in 1993, in a year where the coalition was also in practice in the Azores, both in Ponta Delgada and Corvo, losing both municipalities.

After Sampaio's resignation in order to run for President in the 1996 presidential election, he was replaced by João Soares, the son of former President Mário Soares. Soares won the election to a first full term in 1997, but lost in 2001, being defeated by the Social Democratic Party's candidate, Pedro Santana Lopes.

After the 2001 defeat, there were attempts to replicate the coalition in the 2005 Lisbon election between the PS, the PCP and the BE, but negotiations failed. The same happened during the negotiations to the creation of a left-wing coalition led by Alexandra Leitão in the 2025 Lisbon local election, where the PCP decided not to join the PS/L/BE/PAN coalition.

== Designations ==
=== Lisbon ===
- 1989 – Por Lisboa (For Lisbon) – PS.PCP.PEV.MDP/CDE
- 1993 – Com Lisboa (With Lisbon) – PS.PCP.PEV.PSR.UDP
- 1997 – Mais Lisboa (More Lisbon) – PS.PCP.PEV.UDP
- 2001 – Amar Lisboa (Love Lisbon) – PS.PCP.PEV

=== Ponta Delgada ===
- 1993 – PS.PCP.PEV.UDP.PDA

=== Corvo ===
- 1993 – PS.PCP.PEV

== Electoral results ==
=== Local elections ===
Only in contests where PS and PCP ran in a joint coalition.

Election	Votes	%	Councillors	+/-	Mayors	+/-	Assemblies	+/-	Parishes	+/-
1989	180,760	3.7 (#6)	9 / 2,002	New	1 / 305	New	28 / 6,753	New	392 / 33,000	New
1993	211,240	3.9 (#5)	19 / 2,002	▲10	1 / 305	0	50 / 6,769	▲22	527 / 33,458	▲135
1997	165,008	3.1 (#5)	10 / 2,021	▼9	1 / 305	0	30 / 6,807	▼20	408 / 33,953	▼119
2001	130,279	2.5 (#7)	8 / 2,044	▼2	0 / 308	▼1	24 / 6,876	▼6	309 / 34,569	▼99

==== Lisbon ====
Election	Leader	Votes	%	Seats	+/-	Government
1989	Jorge Sampaio	180,635	49.1 (#1)	9 / 17		Coalition
1993	Jorge Sampaio	200,822	56.7 (#1)	11 / 17	▲2	Coalition
1997	João Soares	165,008	51.9 (#1)	10 / 17	▼1	Coalition
2001	João Soares	130,279	41.7 (#2)	8 / 17	▼2	Opposition

== See also ==
- Coalition PSD/CDS
