= Statue of Fernando Pessoa =

Statue in Lisbon, Portugal

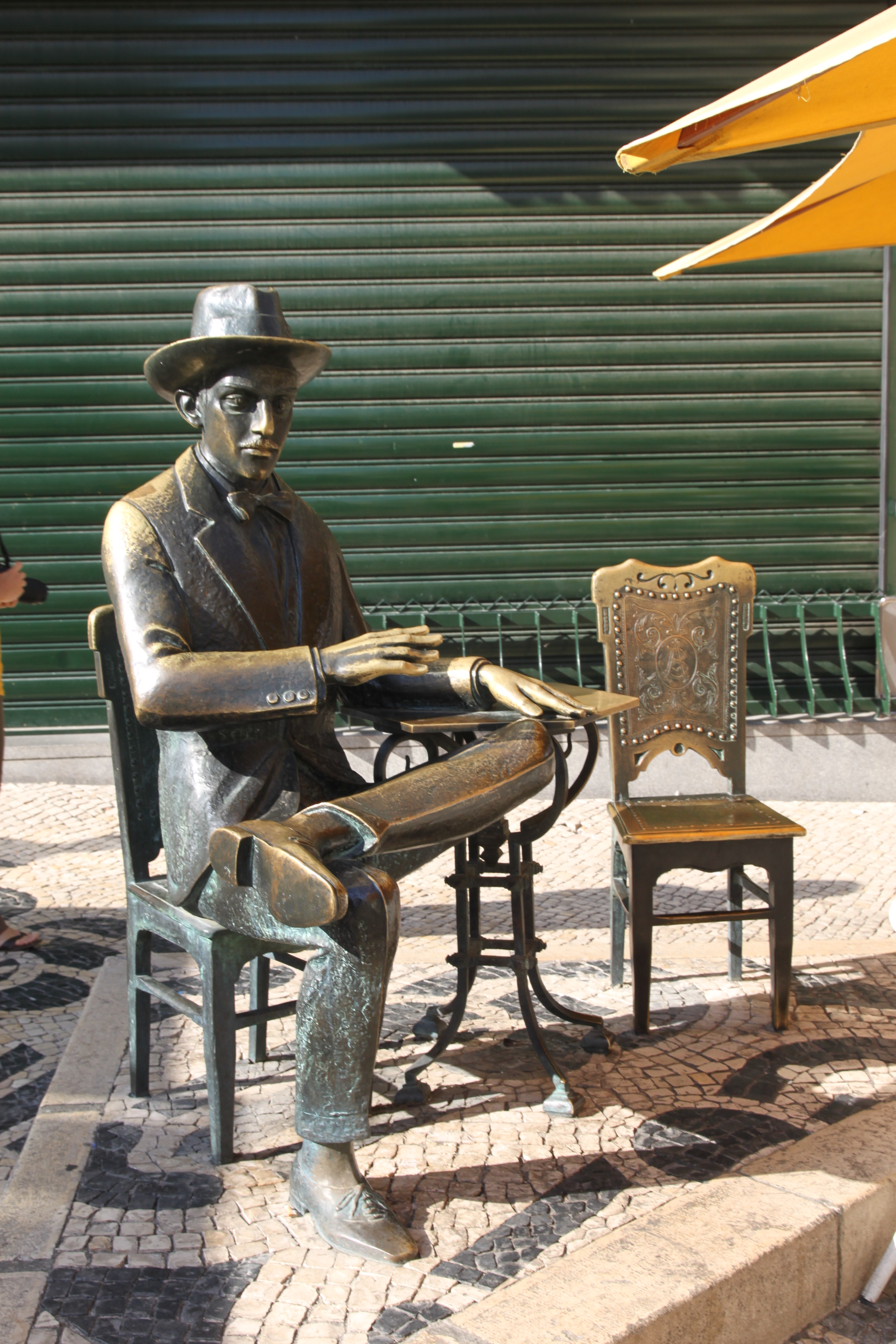
- The sculpture in 2011.
- Interactive map of Statue of Fernando Pessoa
- Location: 120 Garrett Street, Misericórdia, Lisbon, Portugal
- Coordinates: 38°42′38.32″N 9°8′31.59″W
- Designer: Lagoa Henriques
- Type: Statue
- Material: Bronze
- Opening date: 13 June 1988
- Dedicated to: Fernando Pessoa

The statue of Fernando Pessoa (Portuguese: Estátua de Fernando Pessoa) is a bronze statue in Lisbon, Portugal, placed at the Chiado Square, in front of the coffeehouse Café A Brasileira at 120 Garrett Street, within the neighbourhood of Chiado in the civil parish of Misericórdia. It is dedicated to Fernando Pessoa, a poet and writer, considered as one of the most significant literary figures of the 20th century and one of the greatest poets in the Portuguese language. The sculpture was designed by Lagoa Henriques, and unveiled on 13 June 1988.

== History ==
The sculpture was designed by Lagoa Henriques. It was unveiled on 13 June 1988, on the 100 anniversary of Pessoa's birth, by President of Portugal Mário Soares.

== Design ==
The bronze sculpture depicts Fernando Pessoa sitting at a chair, next to a table, with another empty chair on the opposing side. He is depicted wearing a suit and a hat, with his left hand placed on a table, and his left leg on top of the right leg.
