= 1993 Portuguese local elections =

- 12 December 1993

All 305 Portuguese municipalities and 4,260 Portuguese Parishes All 2,011 local government councils
- Turnout: 63.4% ▲2.5 pp
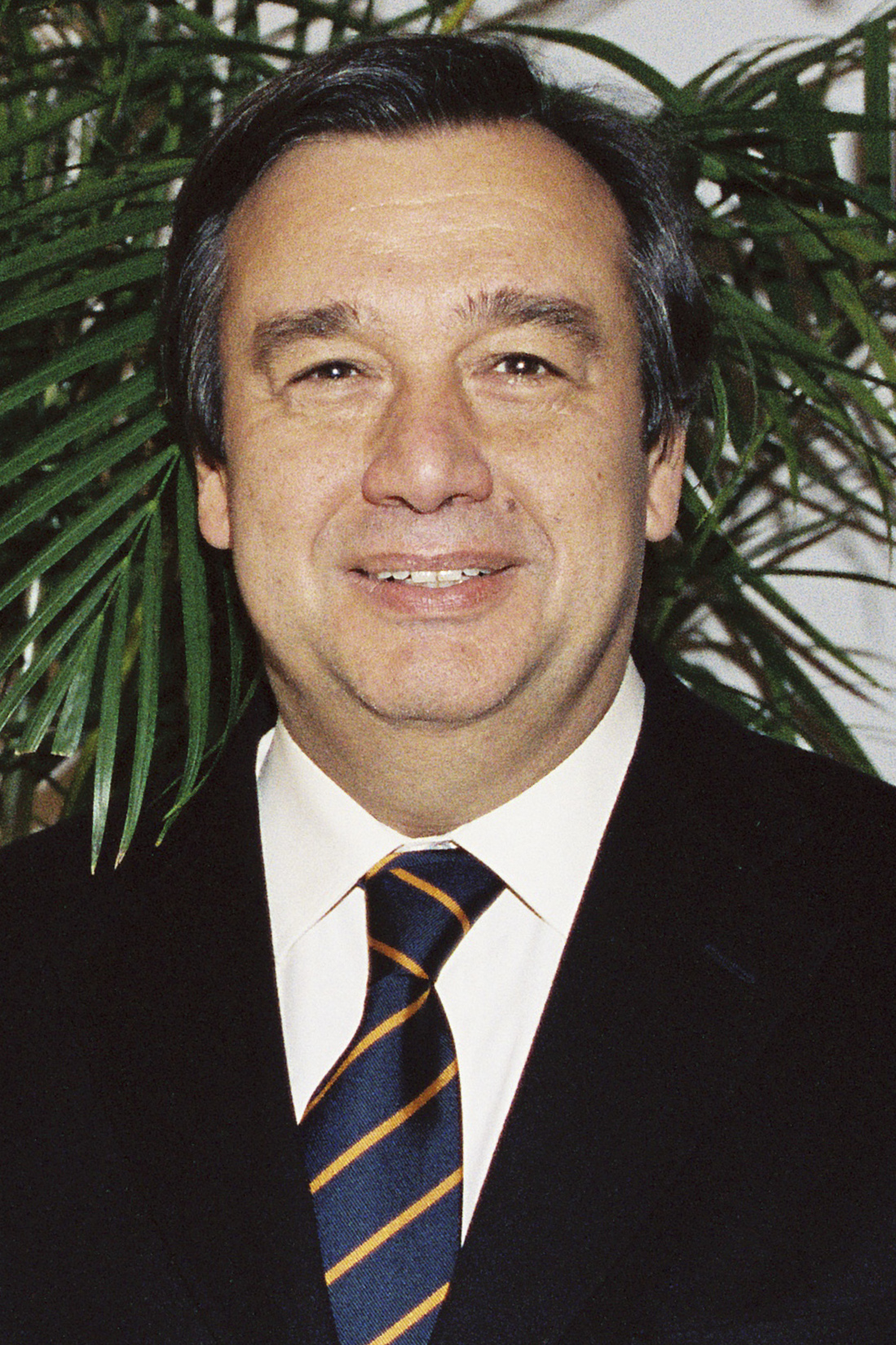

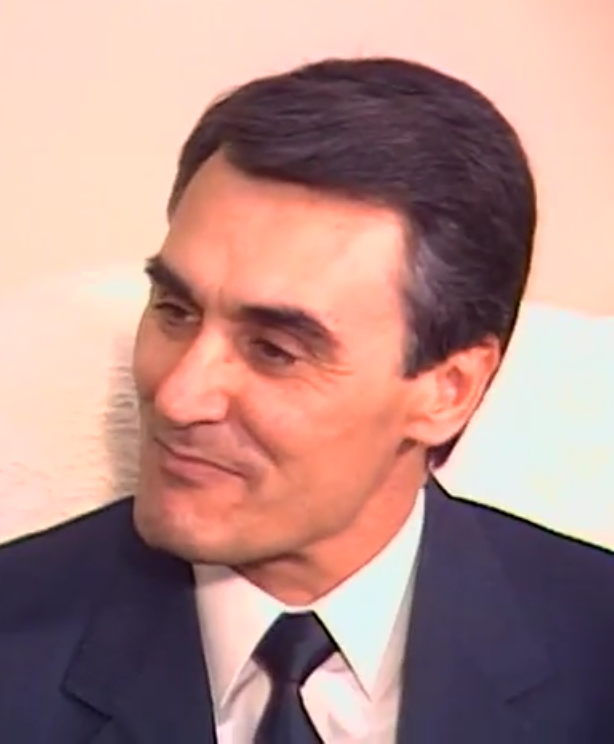

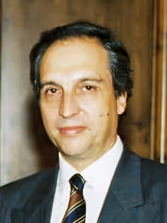

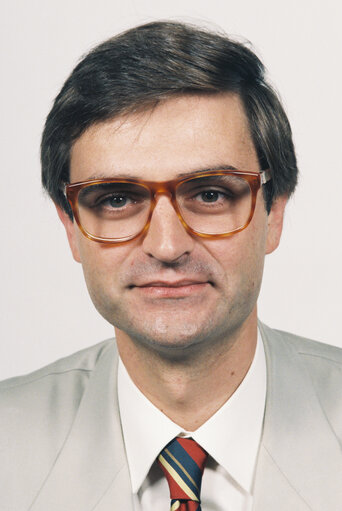
	First party	Second party
Leader	António Guterres	Aníbal Cavaco Silva
Party	PS	PSD
Last election	120 mayors, 36.7%	114 mayors, 35.3%
Popular vote	2,172,753	1,822,925
Percentage	40.2%	33.7%
Swing	▲3.5 pp	▼1.6 pp
Mayors	127	116
Mayors +/–	▲7	▲2
Councillors	819	807
Councillors +/–	▲66	▲13
	Third party	Fourth party
Leader	Carlos Carvalhas	Manuel Monteiro
Party	PCP	CDS–PP
Alliance	CDU
Last election	50 mayors, 12.8%	20 mayors, 9.1%
Popular vote	689,928	455,357
Percentage	12.8%	8.4%
Swing	▼0.0 pp	▼0.6 pp
Mayors	49	13
Mayors +/–	▼1	▼7
Councillors	246	133
Councillors +/–	▼7	▼46

Local elections were held in Portugal on 12 December 1993. The elections consisted of three separate elections in the 305 Portuguese municipalities, the election for the Municipal Chambers, another election for the Municipal Assembly and a last one for the lower-level Parish Assembly, whose winner is elected parish president. This last was held separately in the more than 4,200 parishes around the country.

The Socialist Party (PS) maintained, and also increased, their status as the largest local party. The party won 7 more cities compared with 1989 and, for the first time ever, polled above 40 percent of the votes in a nationwide election. The PS maintained control of big cities like Lisbon, here with a record 57 percent of the votes, Porto and Coimbra, and were also able to win two big cities in the Lisbon area from the PSD, Cascais and Sintra. Note for the very narrow defeat of the PS, under the candidacy of future Prime Minister and European Council President António Costa, in Loures.

The Social Democratic Party (PSD), although showing a slight recovery, saw the gap between it and the PS widen, but at the same time, managed to maintain its ground. The party polled badly in many big urban centers, just as it did four years prior, but was able to win some cities from the PS, like Pombal and Ponta Delgada. The elections happened as Cavaco Silva's government had already been in power for 8 years, and at the same time Portugal was exiting the early 1990s recession, which may have damaged, in some degree, the Social Democrats' prospects for this election.

The Democratic Unity Coalition (CDU) was able to hold on to their 1989 scores losing just one city and seven councillors. The coalition between the Communists and the Greens was able to hold on to their bastions of Beja, Évora and Almada. The coalition's vote share was also unchanged compared with 1989.

The People's Party (CDS–PP) was the big loser of the elections, continuing its decline in local politics. The party lost seven cities, achieving their worst results till that date, managing to win only 13 cities out of 305. The party lost some of their bastions, like Mirandela or Paredes, to the PS or the PSD. The party also achieved their worst share of vote till that time in a local election, 8.4 percent.

Turnout in these elections increased compared with the 1989 election, as 63.4 percent of the electorate cast a ballot, the best turnout showing since 1982.

== Background ==
=== Electoral system ===
All 305 municipalities are allocated a certain number of councilors to elect corresponding to the number of registered voters in a given municipality. Each party or coalition must present a list of candidates. The winner of the most voted list for the municipal council is automatically elected mayor, similar to first-past-the-post (FPTP). The lists are closed and the seats in each municipality are apportioned according to the D'Hondt method.

=== By-elections (1989–1993) ===
During the normal four-year term of local governments, one municipal council by-election was held in the municipality of Monção on 9 December 1990, adding to this, thirty-five parishes also held a by-election for parish assemblies.

City control in by-elections (1989–1993)
Date	Municipality	Population	Previous control	New control
9 December 1990	Monção	23,799	Social Democratic Party (PSD)	Social Democratic Party (PSD)

== Parties ==
The main political forces involved in the election were:

- CDS – People's Party (CDS–PP)^{1},
- Unitary Democratic Coalition (CDU)^{1}
- Socialist Party (PS)^{1}
- Social Democratic Party (PSD)

^{1} The PS formed a coalitions with CDS, CDU and UDP in several municipalities.

== Results ==
=== Municipal Councils ===
==== National summary of votes and seats ====
Summary of the 12 December 1993 Municipal Councils elections results
Parties	Votes	%	±pp swing	Candidacies	Councillors		Mayors	
Parties	Votes	%	±pp swing	Candidacies	Total	±	Total	±
Socialist	1,950,133	36.06	▲3.7	296	795	▲67	126	▲10
Social Democratic	1,822,925	33.71	▲2.3	305	807	▲26	116	▲3
Democratic Unity Coalition	689,928	12.76	▼0.0	300	246	▼6	49	▼1
People's	455,357	8.42	▼0.7	248	133	▼46	13	▼7
PS / CDU / UDP / PSR	200,822	3.71	▲0.0	1	11	▲2	1	0
National Solidarity	28,922	0.53	—	54	3	—	0	—
Earth	23,408	0.43	—	14	2	—	0	—
Portuguese Workers' Communist	15,821	0.30	▼0.2	14	0	0	0	0
Socialist / People's	11,482	0.21	▼0.2	3	7	▼9	0	▼3
PS / CDU / UDP / PDA	10,221	0.19	—	1	4	—	0	—
Popular Democratic Union	8,185	0.15	▼0.2	20	0	▼4	0	▼1
Democratic Renewal	1,455	0.03	▼0.8	4	0	▼4	0	0
Portuguese Democratic Movement	1,386	0.03	▼0.2	1	1	0	0	0
Democratic Party of the Atlantic	285	0.01	0.0	4	0	0	0	0
People's Monarchist	269	0.00	▼0.1	1	0	▼1	0	0
Christian Democratic	214	0.00	▼0.1	1	0	▼1	0	0
PS / CDU	95	0.00	—	1	2	—	0	—
**Total valid**	**5,220,908**	**96.54**	**▼0.1**	—	**2,011**	**▲14**	**305**	**0**
Blank ballots	102,635	1.90	▲0.1					
Invalid ballots	84,576	1.56	▼0.1					
**Total**	**5,408,119**	**100.00**						
Registered voters/turnout	8,530,297	63.40	▲2.5					

==== Municipality map ====
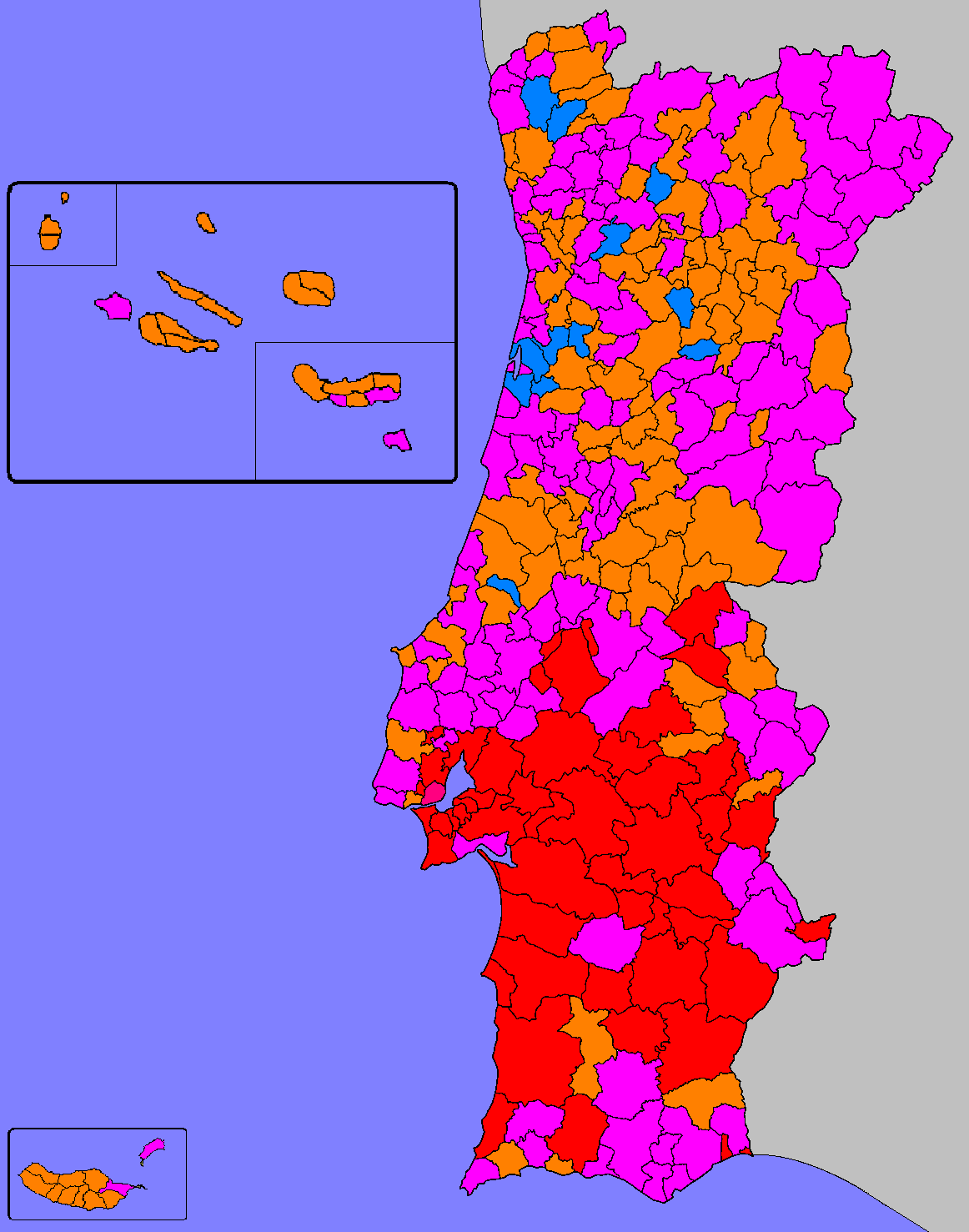
Most voted parties or coalitions in each Municipality. Municipalities won by: ■ - PSD: 116 ■ - PS: 127 ■ - CDU: 49 ■ - CDS–PP: 13

==== City control ====
The following table lists party control in all district capitals, highlighted in bold, as well as in municipalities above 100,000 inhabitants. Population estimates from the 1991 Census.

Municipality	Population	Previous control	New control
Almada	151,783	Unitary Democratic Coalition (CDU)	Unitary Democratic Coalition (CDU)
Amadora	181,774	Unitary Democratic Coalition (CDU)	Unitary Democratic Coalition (CDU)
**Aveiro**	66,444	CDS – People's Party (CDS–PP)	CDS – People's Party (CDS–PP)
Barcelos	111,733	Social Democratic Party (PSD)	Social Democratic Party (PSD)
**Beja**	35,827	Unitary Democratic Coalition (CDU)	Unitary Democratic Coalition (CDU)
**Braga**	141,256	Socialist Party (PS)	Socialist Party (PS)
**Bragança**	33,055	Socialist Party (PS)	Socialist Party (PS)
Cascais	153,294	Social Democratic Party (PSD)	Socialist Party (PS)
**Castelo Branco**	54,310	Social Democratic Party (PSD)	Social Democratic Party (PSD)
**Coimbra**	139,052	Socialist Party (PS)	Socialist Party (PS)
**Évora**	53,754	Unitary Democratic Coalition (CDU)	Unitary Democratic Coalition (CDU)
**Faro**	50,761	Socialist Party (PS)	Socialist Party (PS)
**Funchal**	115,403	Social Democratic Party (PSD)	Social Democratic Party (PSD)
Gondomar	143,178	Socialist Party (PS)	Social Democratic Party (PSD)
**Guarda**	38,765	Socialist Party (PS)	Socialist Party (PS)
Guimarães	157,589	Socialist Party (PS)	Socialist Party (PS)
**Leiria**	102,762	Social Democratic Party (PSD)	Social Democratic Party (PSD)
**Lisbon** (details)	663,394	PS / CDU / MDP/CDE	PS / CDU / UDP / PSR
Loures	322,158	Unitary Democratic Coalition (CDU)	Unitary Democratic Coalition (CDU)
Matosinhos	151,682	Socialist Party (PS)	Socialist Party (PS)
Oeiras	151,342	Social Democratic Party (PSD)	Social Democratic Party (PSD)
**Ponta Delgada**	61,989	PS / CDS–PP	Social Democratic Party (PSD)
**Portalegre**	26,111	Social Democratic Party (PSD)	Social Democratic Party (PSD)
**Porto**	302,472	Socialist Party (PS)	Socialist Party (PS)
**Santarém**	62,621	Socialist Party (PS)	Socialist Party (PS)
Santa Maria da Feira	135,964	Social Democratic Party (PSD)	Social Democratic Party (PSD)
Santo Tirso	102,593	Socialist Party (PS)	Socialist Party (PS)
Seixal	116,912	Unitary Democratic Coalition (CDU)	Unitary Democratic Coalition (CDU)
**Setúbal**	103,634	Socialist Party (PS)	Socialist Party (PS)
Sintra	260,951	PSD / CDS–PP	Socialist Party (PS)
**Viana do Castelo**	83,095	Social Democratic Party (PSD)	Socialist Party (PS)
Vila Franca de Xira	103,571	Unitary Democratic Coalition (CDU)	Unitary Democratic Coalition (CDU)
Vila Nova de Famalicão	114,338	Socialist Party (PS)	Socialist Party (PS)
Vila Nova de Gaia	248,565	Socialist Party (PS)	Socialist Party (PS)
**Vila Real**	46,300	Social Democratic Party (PSD)	Social Democratic Party (PSD)
**Viseu**	83,601	Social Democratic Party (PSD)	Social Democratic Party (PSD)

=== Municipal Assemblies ===
==== National summary of votes and seats ====
Summary of the 12 December 1993 Municipal Assemblies elections results
Parties	Votes	%	±pp swing	Candidacies	Mandates	
Parties	Votes	%	±pp swing	Candidacies	Total	±
Socialist	1,930,816	35.70	▲3.6		2,641	▲196
Social Democratic	1,829,087	33.82	▲2.5		2,681	▲99
Democratic Unity Coalition	704,980	13.04	▼0.2		803	▼45
People's	445,065	8.23	▼0.7		557	▼141
PS / CDU / UDP / PSR	194,501	3.60	▲0.2		32	▼9
National Solidarity	23,260	0.43	—		16	—
Earth	22,653	0.42	—		11	—
Portuguese Workers' Communist	12,063	0.22	▼0.0		1	▲1
Socialist / People's	11,905	0.22	▼0.5		24	▼21
Popular Democratic Union	11,009	0.20	▼0.2		2	▼12
PS / CDU / UDP / PDA	9,958	0.18	—		11	—
Revolutionary Socialist	9,733	0.18	—		0	—
People's Monarchist	3,494	0.06	▲0.0		0	▼2
Democratic Renewal	1,476	0.03	▼0.8		2	▼23
Portuguese Democratic Movement	1,340	0.02	▼0.2		4	▼2
PS / CDU	96	0.00	—		7	—
**Total valid**	**5,211,436**	**96.36**	**▲0.2**	—	**6,792**	**▲29**
Blank ballots	111,834	2.07	▼0.0			
Invalid ballots	85,042	1.57	▼0.1			
**Total**	**5,408,312**	**100.00**				
Registered voters/turnout	8,530,297	63.40	▲2.5			

=== Parish Assemblies ===
==== National summary of votes and seats ====
Summary of the 12 December 1993 Parish Assemblies elections results
Parties	Votes	%	±pp swing	Candidacies	Mandates		Presidents	
Parties	Votes	%	±pp swing	Candidacies	Total	±	Total	±
Socialist	1,860,164	34.53	▲3.5		12,311	▲1,110	1,533	▲175
Social Democratic	1,810,841	33.62	▲1.9		13,679	▲418	1,661	▼31
Democratic Unity Coalition	714,011	13.26	▼0.3		2,747	▼182	316	▼23
People's	418,733	7.77	▼0.6		2,719	▼715	249	▼99
PS / CDU / UDP / PSR	199,275	3.70	▼0.2		447	▲57	52	▲15
Independents	123,617	2.29	▲0.4		1,235	▲217	149	▲8
National Solidarity	21,462	0.40	—		55	—	3	—
Earth	12,490	0.23	—		38	—	2	—
Socialist / People's	11,913	0.22	▼0.4		124	▼61	12	▼1
PS / CDU / UDP / PDA	10,593	0.20	—		80	—	6	—
Popular Democratic Union	7,639	0.14	▼0.4		2	▼28	0	▼2
Portuguese Workers' Communist	3,820	0.07	▼0.0		1	▲1	0	0
Democratic Renewal	1,525	0.03	▼0.6		10	▼49	1	▼1
Portuguese Democratic Movement	1,163	0.02	▼0.2		8	▼5	1	▲1
People's Monarchist	306	0.01	▼0.0		2	▼7	0	0
Left Revolutionary Front	77	0.00	—		0	—	0	—
**Total valid**	**5,197,629**	**96.49**	**▲0.1**	—	**33,458**	**▲414**	**3,985**	**▲18**
Blank ballots	99,518	1.85	▲0.0					
Invalid ballots	89,503	1.66	▼0.1					
**Total**	**5,386,650**	**100.00**						
Registered voters/turnout	8,497,388	63.15	▲2.5					

== See also ==
- Politics of Portugal
- List of political parties in Portugal
- Elections in Portugal
