= Campo de Ourique =

- Civil parish
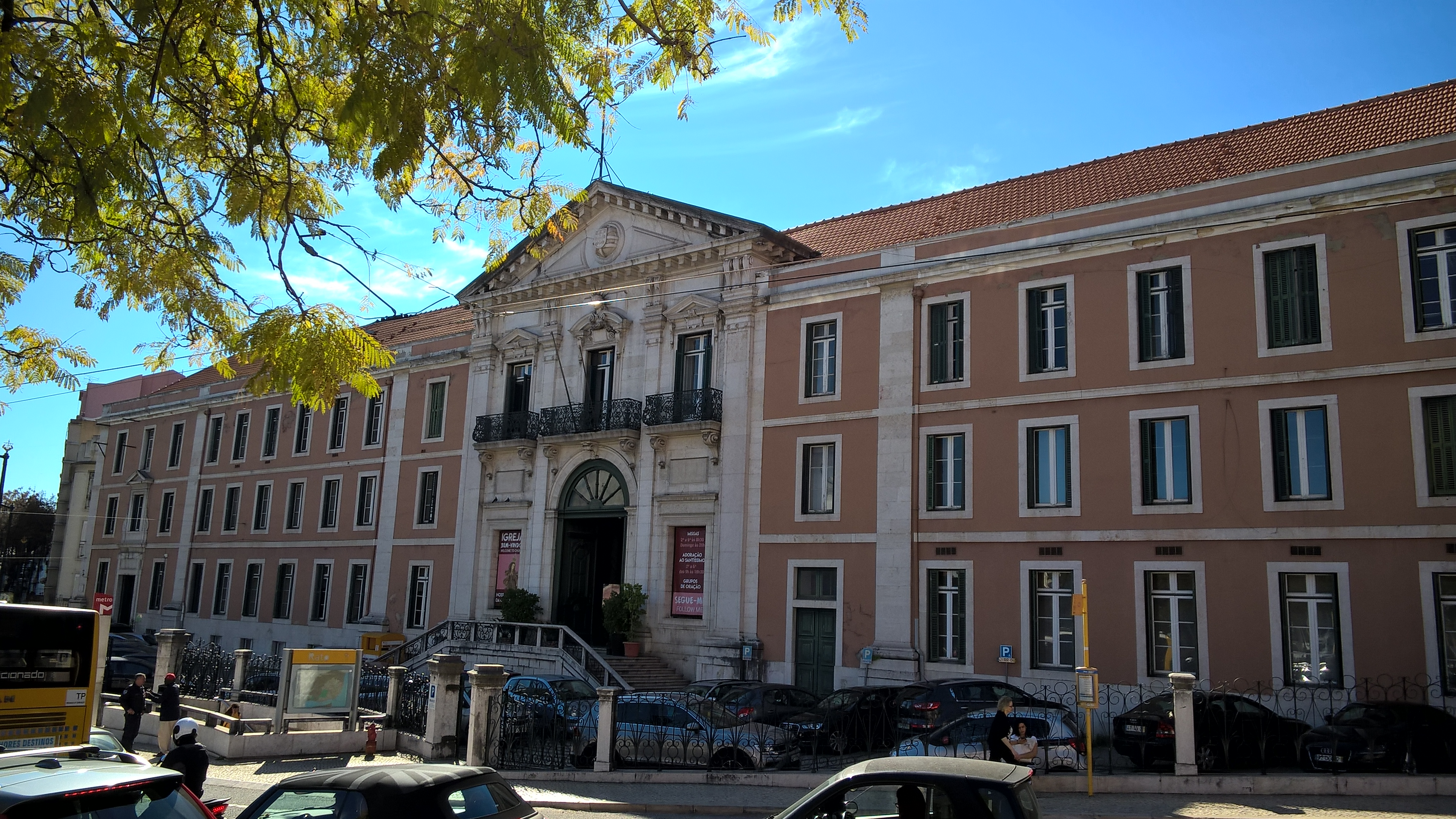
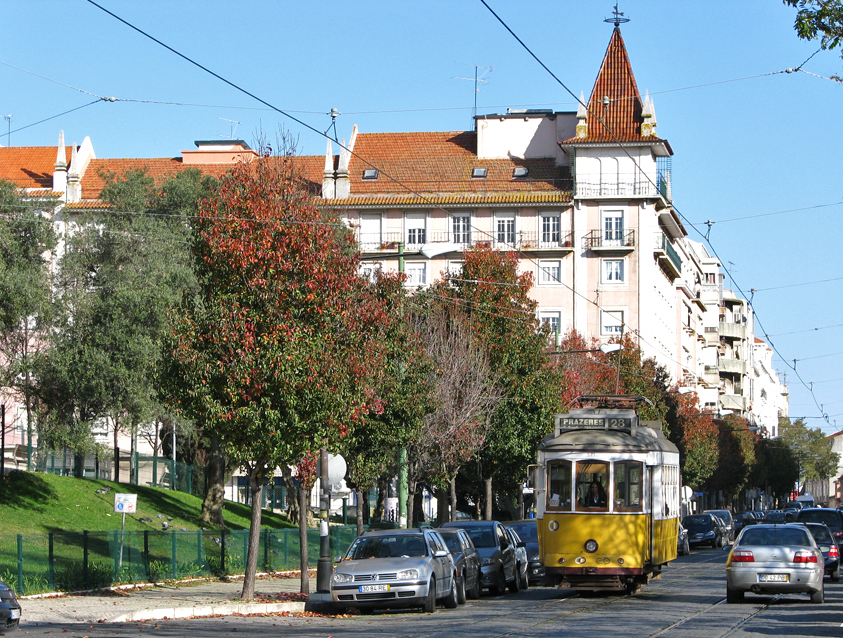
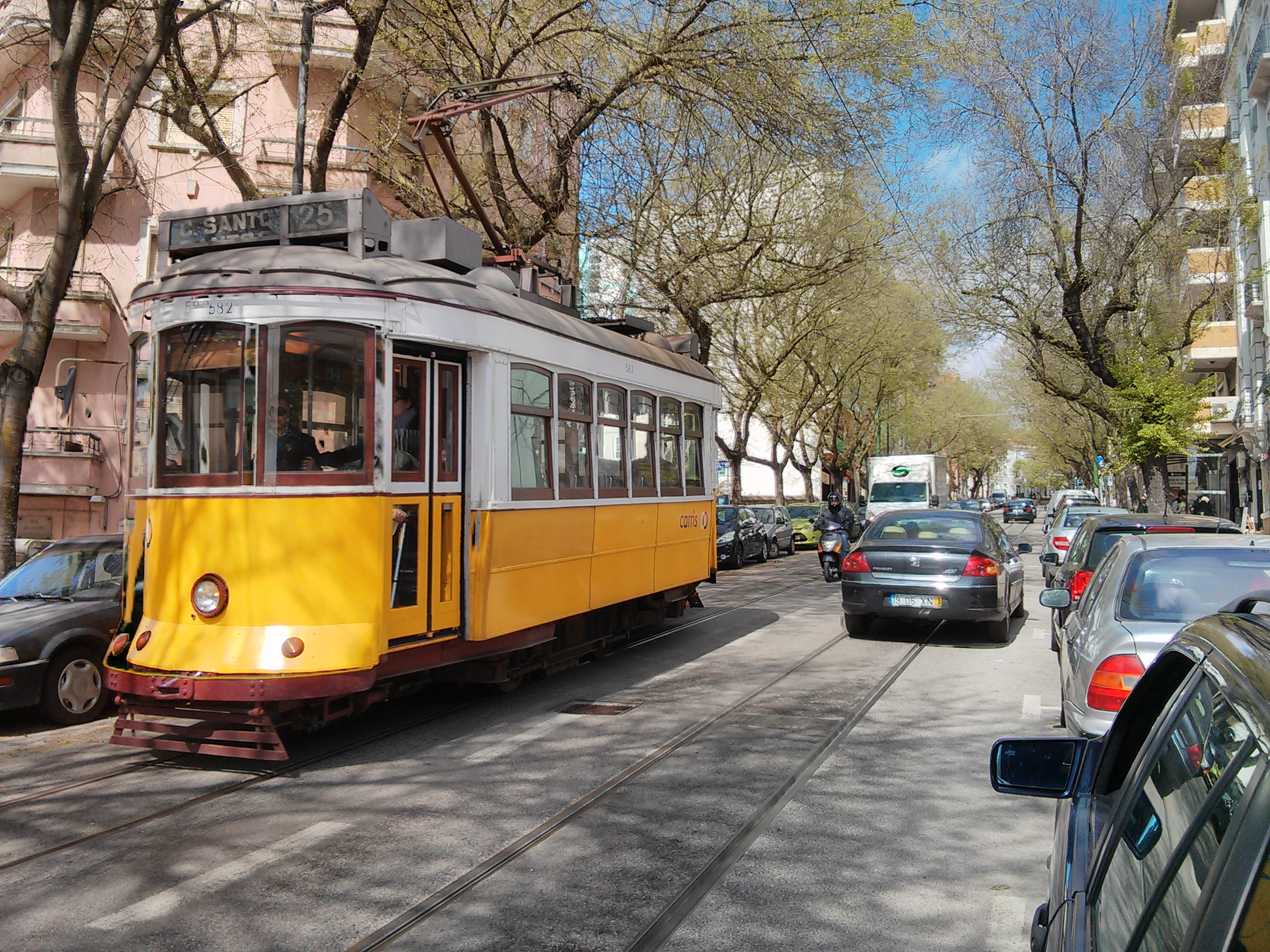
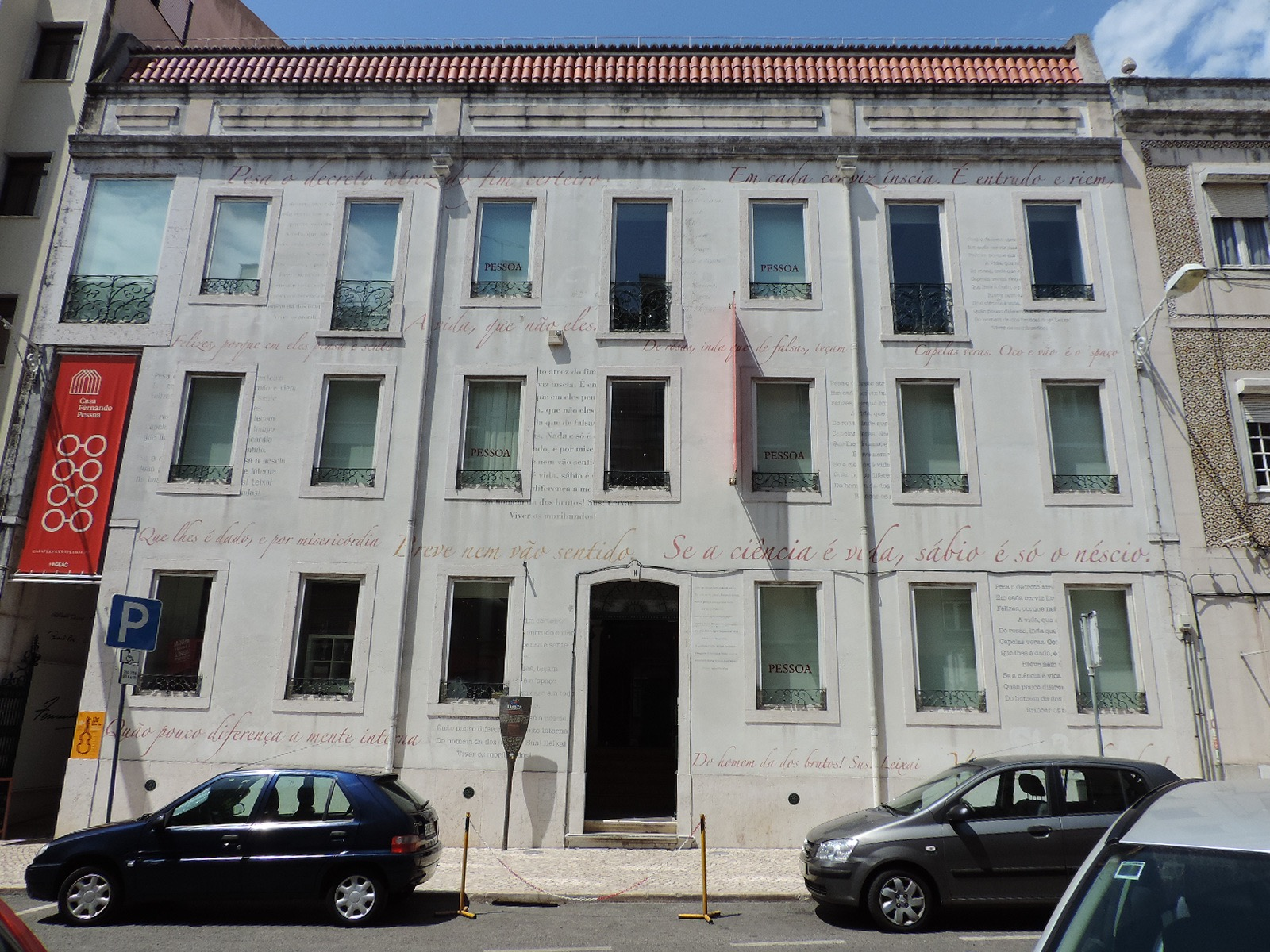
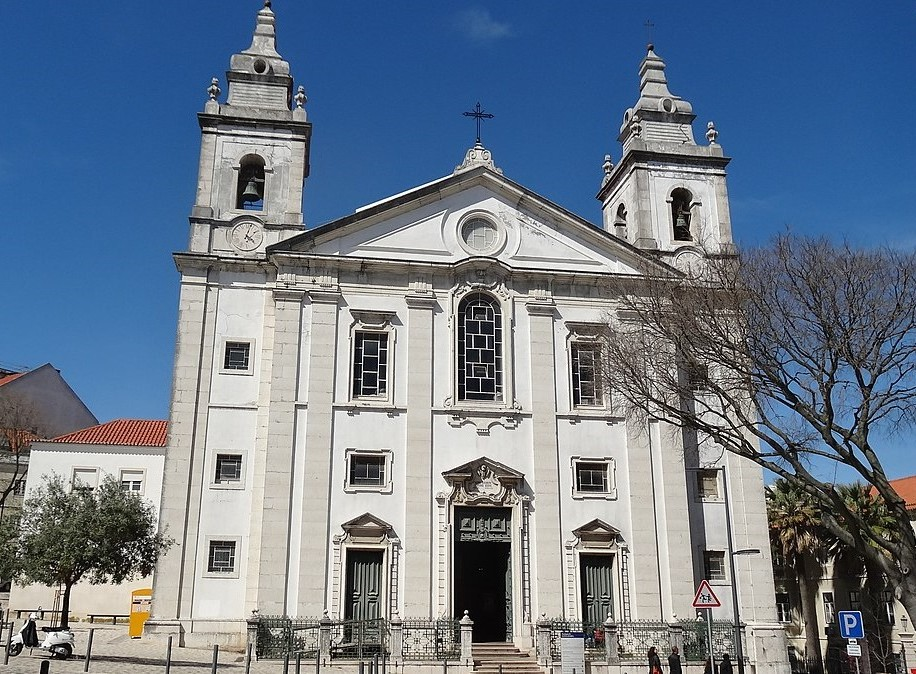
- Clockwise: Igreja da Nossa Senhora da Conceição; Lisbon tram; Igreja de Santa Isabel; Casa Fernando Pessoa; streets of Campo de Ourique.

- Coordinates: 38.715°N 9.167°W
- Country: Portugal
- Region: Lisbon
- Metropolitan area: Lisbon
- District: Lisbon
- Municipality: Lisbon

Area
  - Total: 1.65 km^{2} (0.64 sq mi)

Population (2011)
  - Total: 22,120
  - Density: 13,400/km^{2} (34,700/sq mi)
- Time zone: UTC+00:00 (WET)
  - Summer (DST): UTC+01:00 (WEST)

Campo de Ourique (locally [ˈkɐ̃pu ð(i) oˈɾikɨ]) is a freguesia (civil parish) and district of Lisbon, the capital of Portugal. Camp de Ourique is located in the historic center of Lisbon, east of Alcântara, north of Estrela, west of Santo António, and south of Campolide. The population in 2011 was 22,120.

== History ==
The freguesia was created during the 2012 Administrative Reform of Lisbon, merging the former parishes of Santo Condestável and Santa Isabel.

Currently, the priest responsible for the parish is Father José Manuel Pereira de Almeida.

=== Parish Presidents ===
No.	Name (Birth–Death)	Term of office	Political party
1	Pedro Cegonho (1978–)	2013-2020	PS
2	Pedro Costa (1990–)	2020-2024	PS
3	Hugo Vieira da Silva (1987–)	2024-2025	PS
4	Ana Mateus	2025-	PSD

=== Local election results ===
Summary of local elections for the Campo de Ourique Parish (including coalitions and elected officials)
Election	PCP	PEV	BE	L	PS	PTP	IL	A	PSD	MPT	CDS	PPM	PND	CH PPV	ADN PDR	Turnout
2013	CDU								FL			CP				49.3
2013	12.1		6.7		41.4	0.6			29.8			2.1				49.3
2013	2	0	1		9	0			6	0	1	0	0	0		49.3
2017	CDU									OL						53.0
2017	10.2		9.6		38.5				19.4	17.0						53.0
2017	2	0	2		8				4	0	3	0				53.0
2021	CDU			ML				NT								53.5
2021	8.8		7.5	34.3			6.4	34.0						4.8	0.5	53.5
2021	1	0	1	0	5		1	0	2	0	3	0		0	0	53.5

== Notable people ==
- Fernando Pessoa, Portuguese writer, his apartment is now a museum
- Luís de Sttau Monteiro, Portuguese writer
- Jorge Costa Pinto
- Jorge Borges de Macedo
- Rão Kyao
- João Afonso
- Manuel João Vieira
- João D'Ávila
- Fernanda Lapa
- Fernanda Borsatti
- Miguel Simões
- João Peste
- São José Lapa
- Jorge Silva Melo
- José Nascimento
- Jorge Martins
- Artur Varatojo
- Manuel Costa Cabral
- Luís Varatojo
- Guida Maria
- Judith Teixeira
