= São Mamede, Lisbon =

São Mamede
- Civil parish
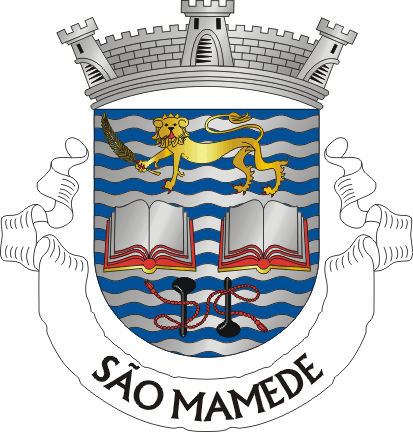
- Coat of arms

- Location in Portugal
- Coordinates: 38°42′45″N 9°08′35″W
- Country: Portugal
- Region: Lisbon
- Metropolitan area: Lisbon
- District: Lisbon
- Municipality: Lisbon
- Disbanded: 2012

Area
  - Total: 0.60 km^{2} (0.23 sq mi)

Population (2001)
  - Total: 6,004
  - Density: 10,000/km^{2} (26,000/sq mi)
- Time zone: UTC+00:00 (WET)
  - Summer (DST): UTC+01:00 (WEST)
- Website: http://www.f-saomamede.pt/

São Mamede (English: Saint Mammes) is a former civil parish (freguesia) in the municipality of Lisbon, Portugal. At the administrative reorganization of Lisbon on 8 December 2012 it became part of the parish Santo António.

== Main sites ==
- Botanic Garden
- Real Colégio dos Nobres
- Palmela Palace
- Daupiás Casa e Jardim
- Silk Factory
