= São José, Lisbon =

São José
- Civil parish
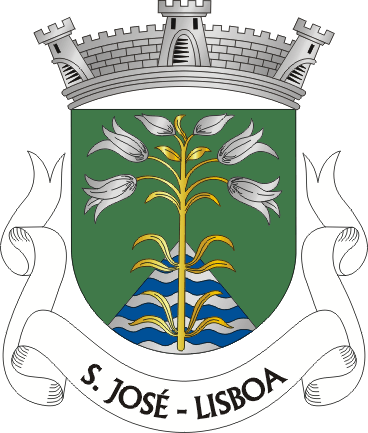
- Coat of arms

- Location in Portugal
- Coordinates: 38.43°N 9.08°W
- Country: Portugal
- Region: Lisbon
- Metropolitan area: Lisbon
- District: Lisbon
- Municipality: Lisbon
- Disbanded: 2012

Area
  - Total: 0.34 km^{2} (0.13 sq mi)

Population (2001)
  - Total: 3,279
  - Density: 9,600/km^{2} (25,000/sq mi)
- Time zone: UTC+00:00 (WET)
  - Summer (DST): UTC+01:00 (WEST)
- Website: http://www.jf-sjose.pt/

São José (English: Saint Joseph) is a former civil parish (freguesia) in the municipality of Lisbon, Portugal. It was created on November 20, 1567, by Cardinal D. Henrique. At the administrative reorganization of Lisbon on 8 December 2012 it became part of the parish Santo António.

== Main sites ==
- Capuchos Convent
- São José Church
- Tivoli Cinema
- Odeon Cinema
- Capitólio Theater
