= Misericórdia =

- Civil parish
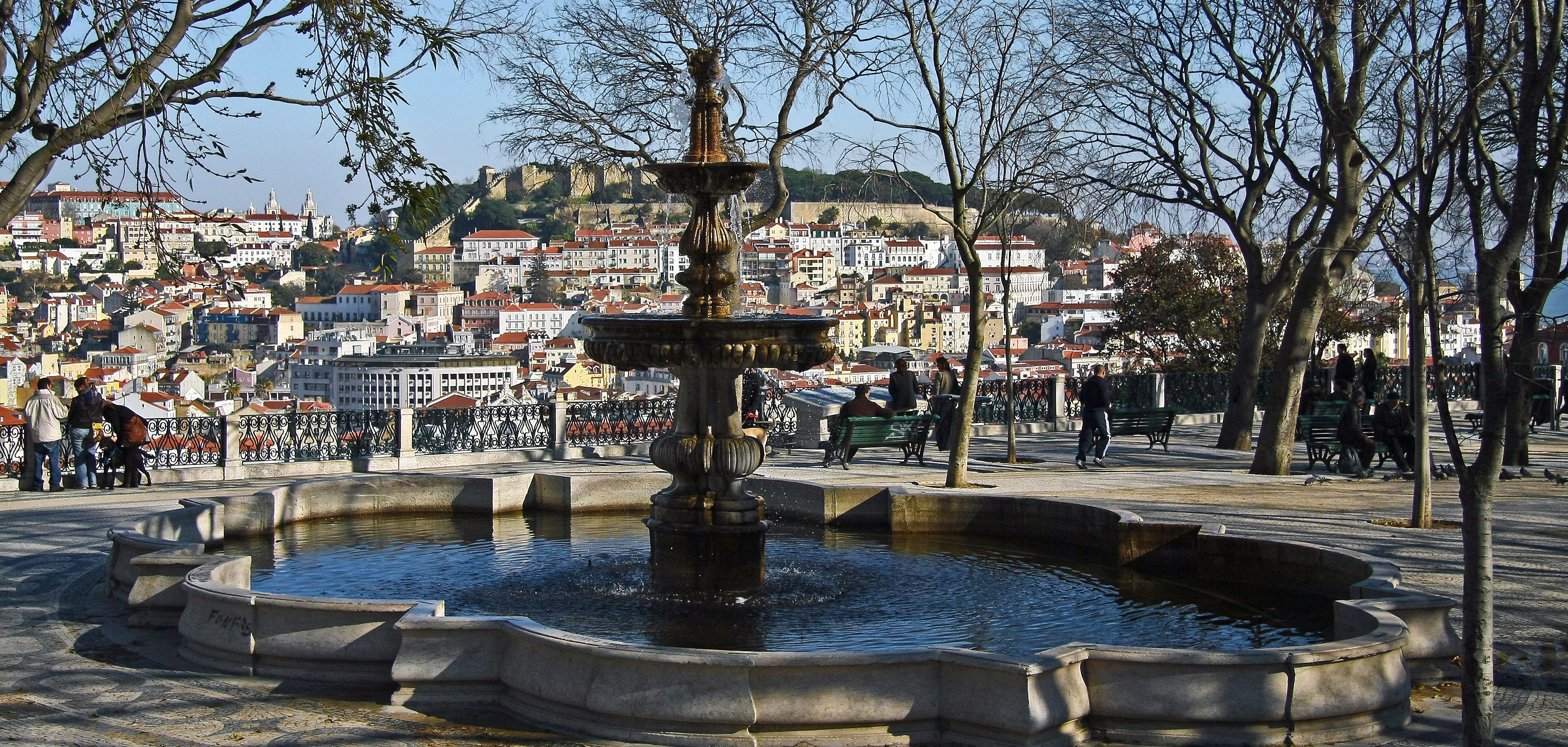
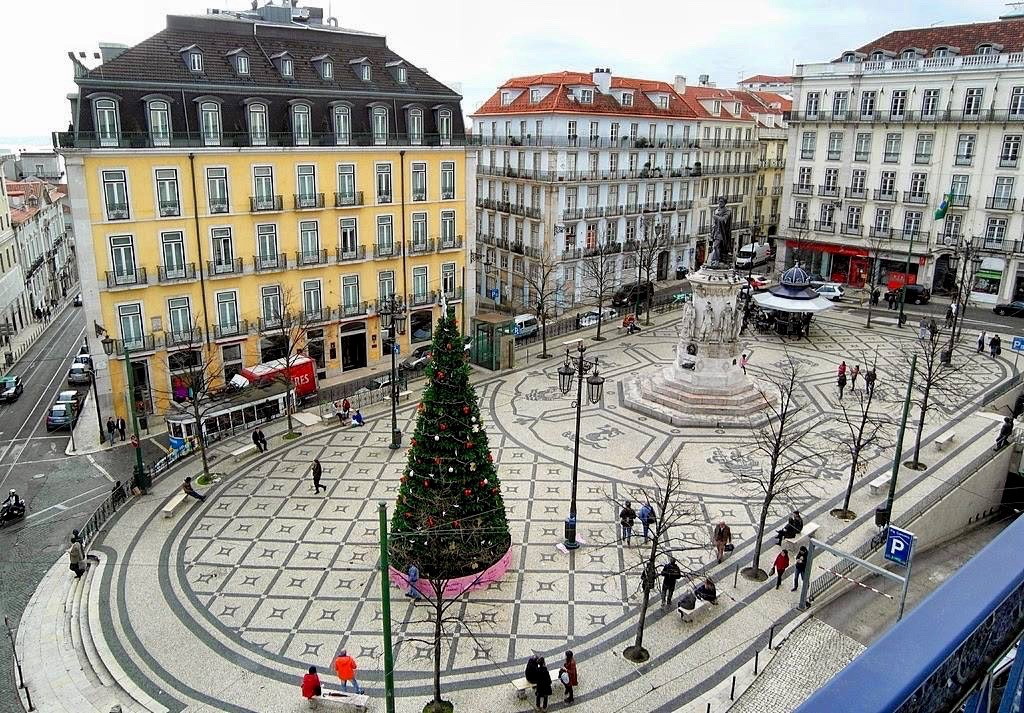
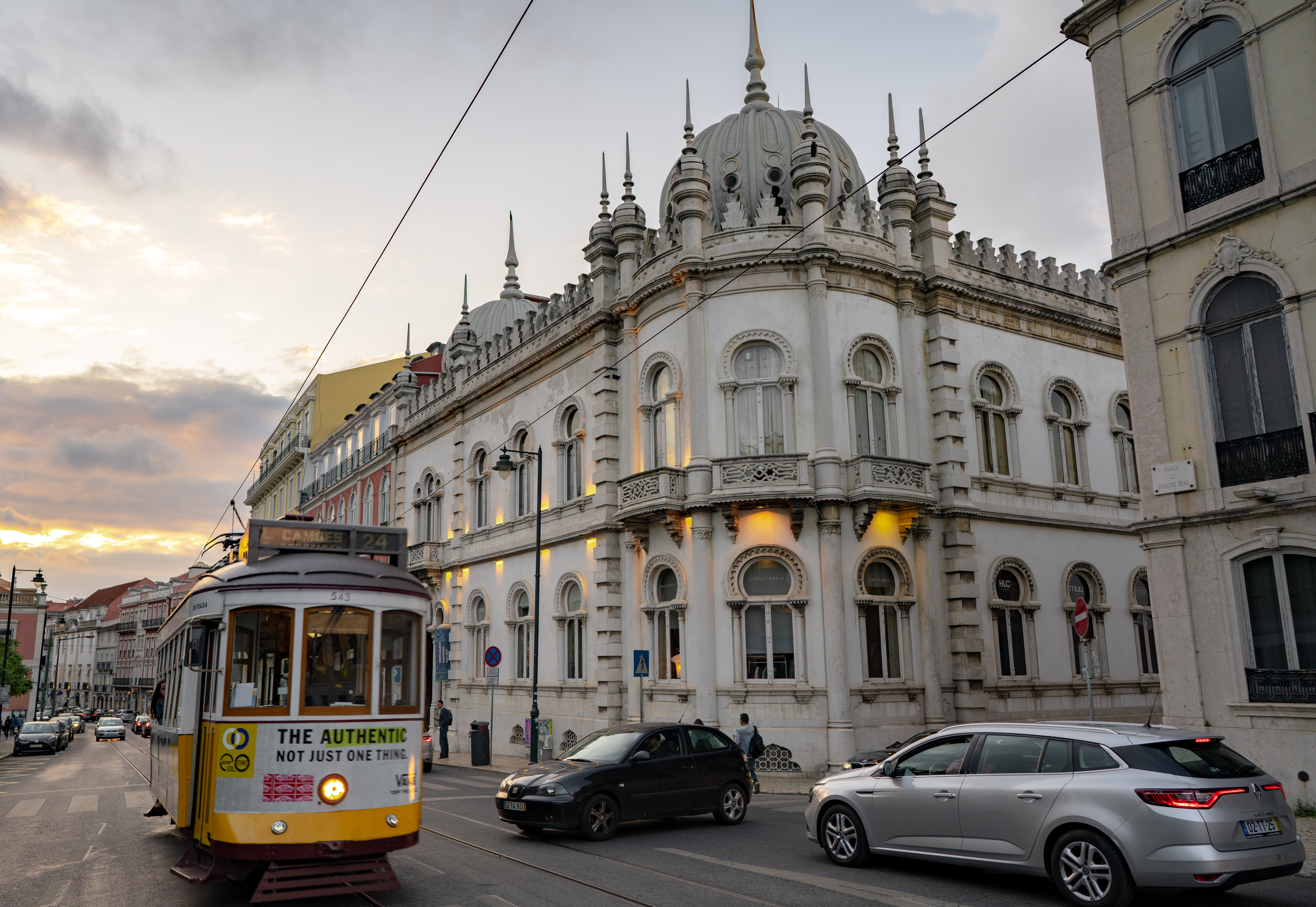
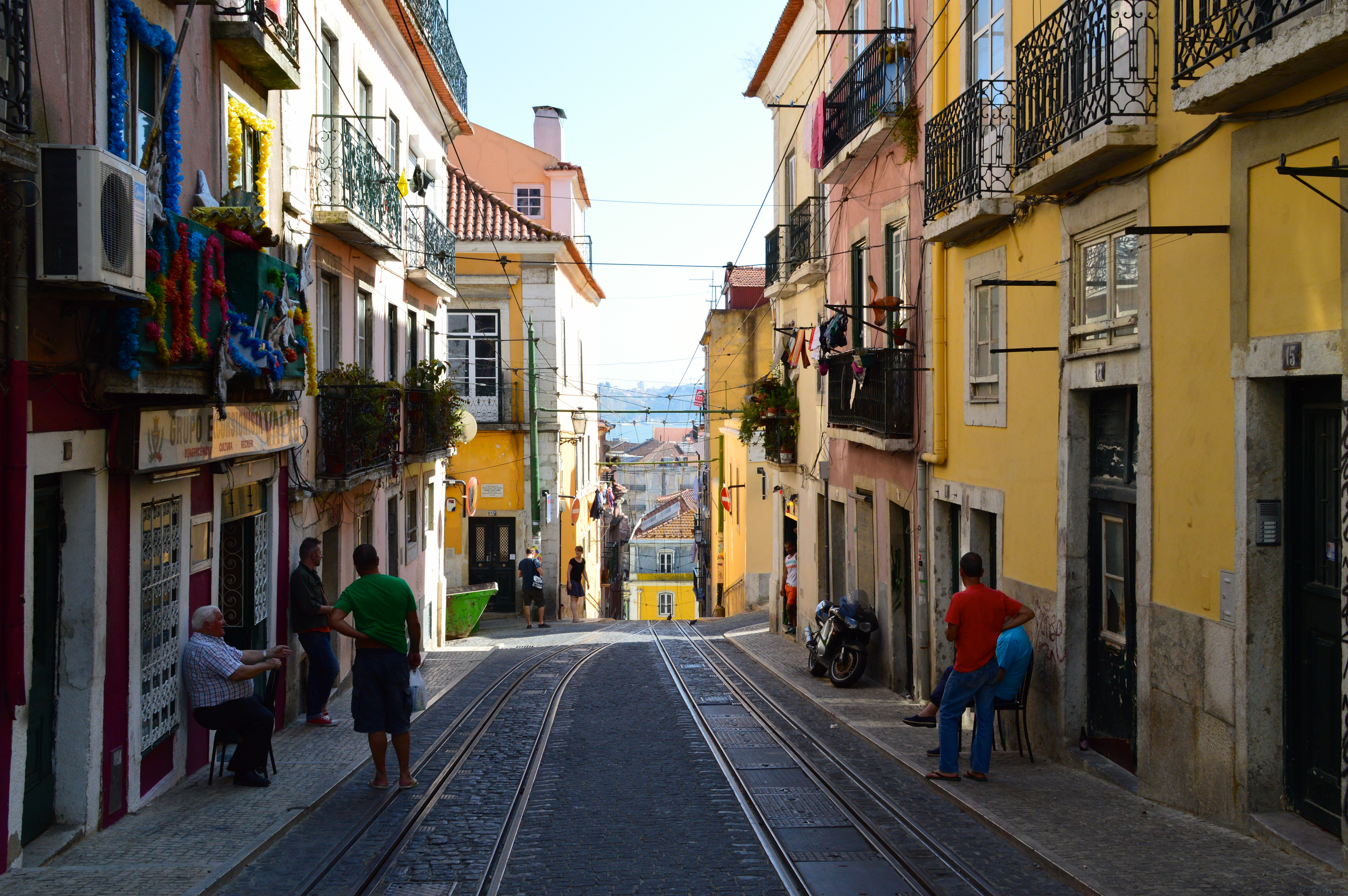
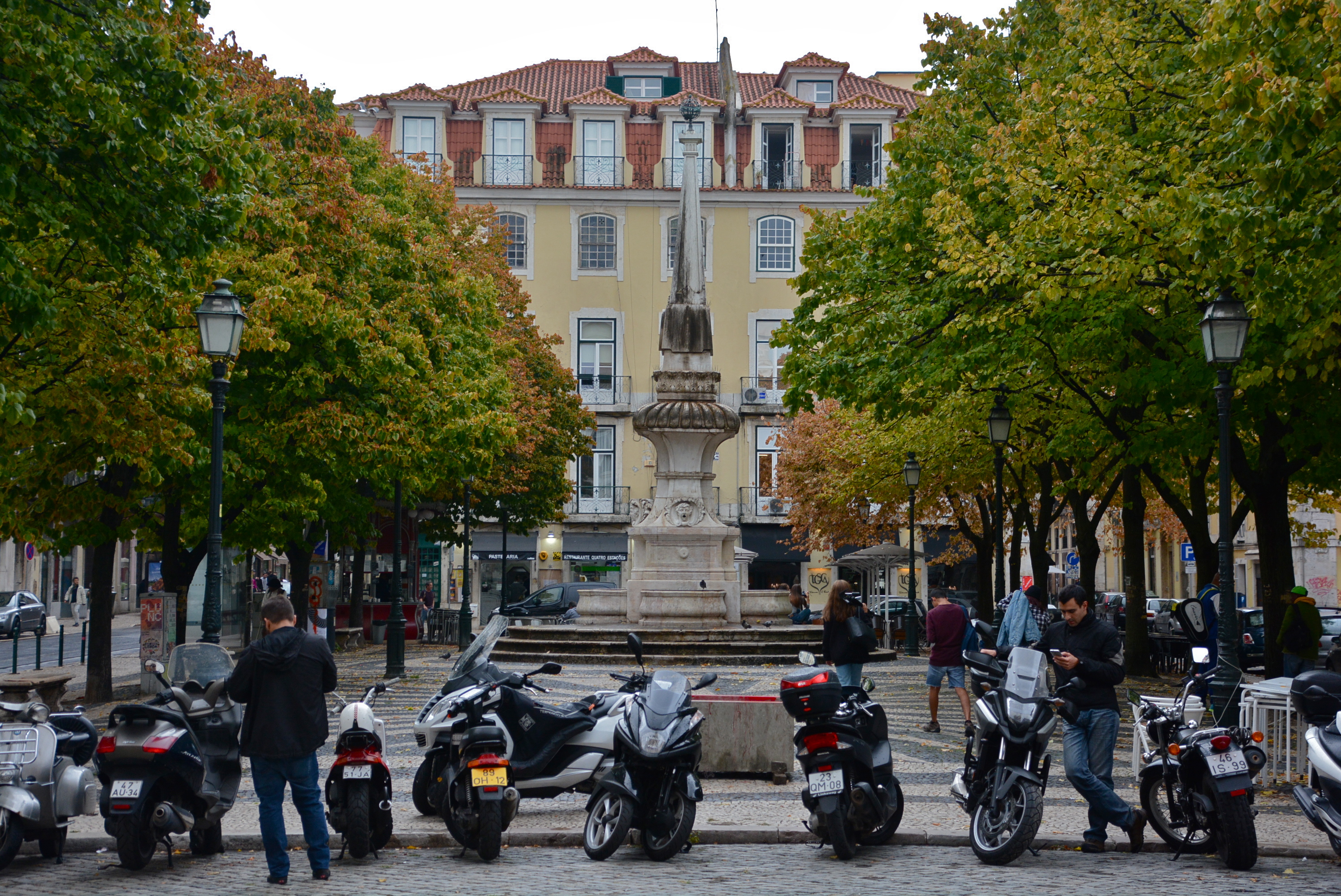
- Clockwise: View of São Jorge Castle from the Miradouro de São Pedro de Alcântara; the Praça de Camões; Príncipe Real neighborhood; Praça de São Paulo, Bairro Alto neighborhood.

- Coordinates: 38.711°N 9.148°W
- Country: Portugal
- Region: Lisbon
- Metropolitan area: Lisbon
- District: Lisbon
- Municipality: Lisbon

Area
  - Total: 2.19 km^{2} (0.85 sq mi)

Population (2011)
  - Total: 13,044
  - Density: 5,960/km^{2} (15,400/sq mi)
- Time zone: UTC+00:00 (WET)
  - Summer (DST): UTC+01:00 (WEST)

Misericórdia (Portuguese pronunciation: [ˌmizɨɾiˈkɔɾðjɐ]) is a freguesia (civil parish) and district of Lisbon, the capital of Portugal. Located in the historic center of Lisbon, Misericórdia is to the east of Estrela, west of Santa Maria Maior, and south of Santo António. It is home to numerous famous neighborhoods, including Bairro Alto, Príncipe Real, and parts of Chiado. The population in 2011 was 13,044.

== History ==
This new parish was created with the 2012 Administrative Reform of Lisbon, merging the former parishes of Mercês, Santa Catarina, Encarnação and São Paulo.

== Landmarks ==
- Chiado neighborhood
  - Praça de Camões
  - Largo do Chiado
- Bairro Alto neighborhood
  - Carmo Convent
- Príncipe Real neighborhood
