= Pedro Feist =

Portuguese politician (1936–2026)

Member of the Assembly of the Republic of Portugal for Lisbon
- In office 31 May 1983 – 12 August 1987
- In office 27 October 1995 – 24 October 1999

Personal details
- Born: Pedro José del Negro Feist; 11 March 1936
- Died: 12 May 2026 (aged 90)
- Party: CDS–PP
- Occupation: Businessman

Pedro José del Negro Feist (11 March 1936 – 12 May 2026) was a Portuguese politician. A member of the CDS – People's Party, he served in the Assembly of the Republic from 1983 to 1987 and from 1995 to 1999.

Feist died on 12 May 2026, at the age of 90.
