= Santa Catarina, Lisbon =

Santa Catarina
- Civil Parish
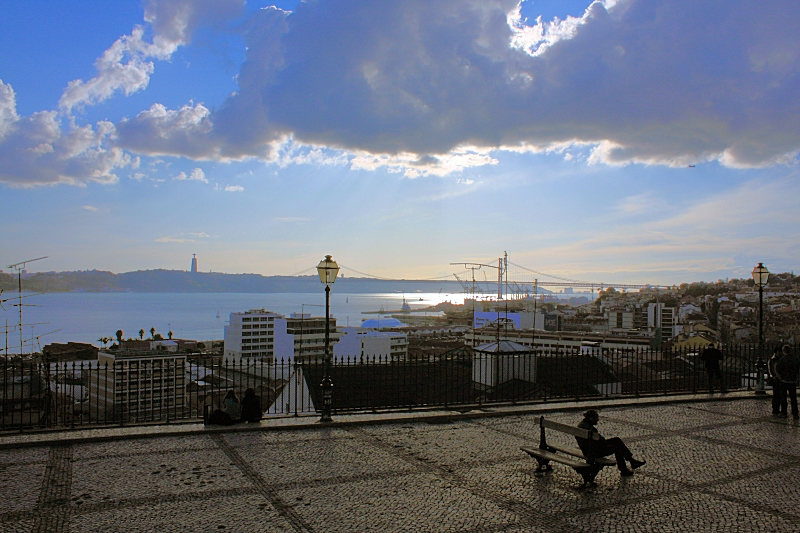
- The scenic overlook of Miradouro da Santa Catarina, showing a view of the Tagus River and local neighborhoods
- Etymology: Santa Catarina, Portuguese for Saint Catherine, referring to Catherine of Alexandria
- Interactive map of Santa Catarina
- Coordinates: 38°42′40.95″N 9°8′53.4″W
- Country: Portugal
- Region: Lisbon
- Sub-region: Lisbon
- District: Lisbon
- Municipality: Lisbon
- Parish: 9 October 1559
- Civil Parish: 28 November 1684
- Localities: Avenida D. Carlos I, Calçada do Combro, Rua da Rosa, Rua da Santa Catarina, Rua do Poço dos Negros, Rua do Século

Government
  - Type: LAU
  - Body: Freguesia/Junta Freguesia
  - Mayor: Maria Irene dos Santos Lopes
  - President Assembleia: João Manuel Vidal Nabais

Area
  - Total: 0.21 km^{2} (0.081 sq mi)
- Elevation: 39 m (128 ft)

Population (2001)
  - Total: 4,081
  - Density: 19,000/km^{2} (50,000/sq mi)
- Time zone: UTC0 (WET)
  - Summer (DST): UTC+1 (WEST)
- Postal Zone: 1200-153 Lisboa
- Area code: (+351) 213 XXX XXX
- Patron Saint: Santa Catarina
- Parish Address: Largo Dr. António de Sousa Macedo; 1200-153 Lisboa
- Website: http://jf-santacatarina.pt

Santa Catarina (English: Saint Catherine) is a former parish (freguesia) in the municipality of Lisbon, Portugal. At the administrative reorganization of Lisbon on 8 December 2012 it became part of the parish Misericórdia. Its area is 0.21 km^{2}, and its population exceeds 4081 inhabitants (density 19433 inhabitants/km^{2}).

== History ==
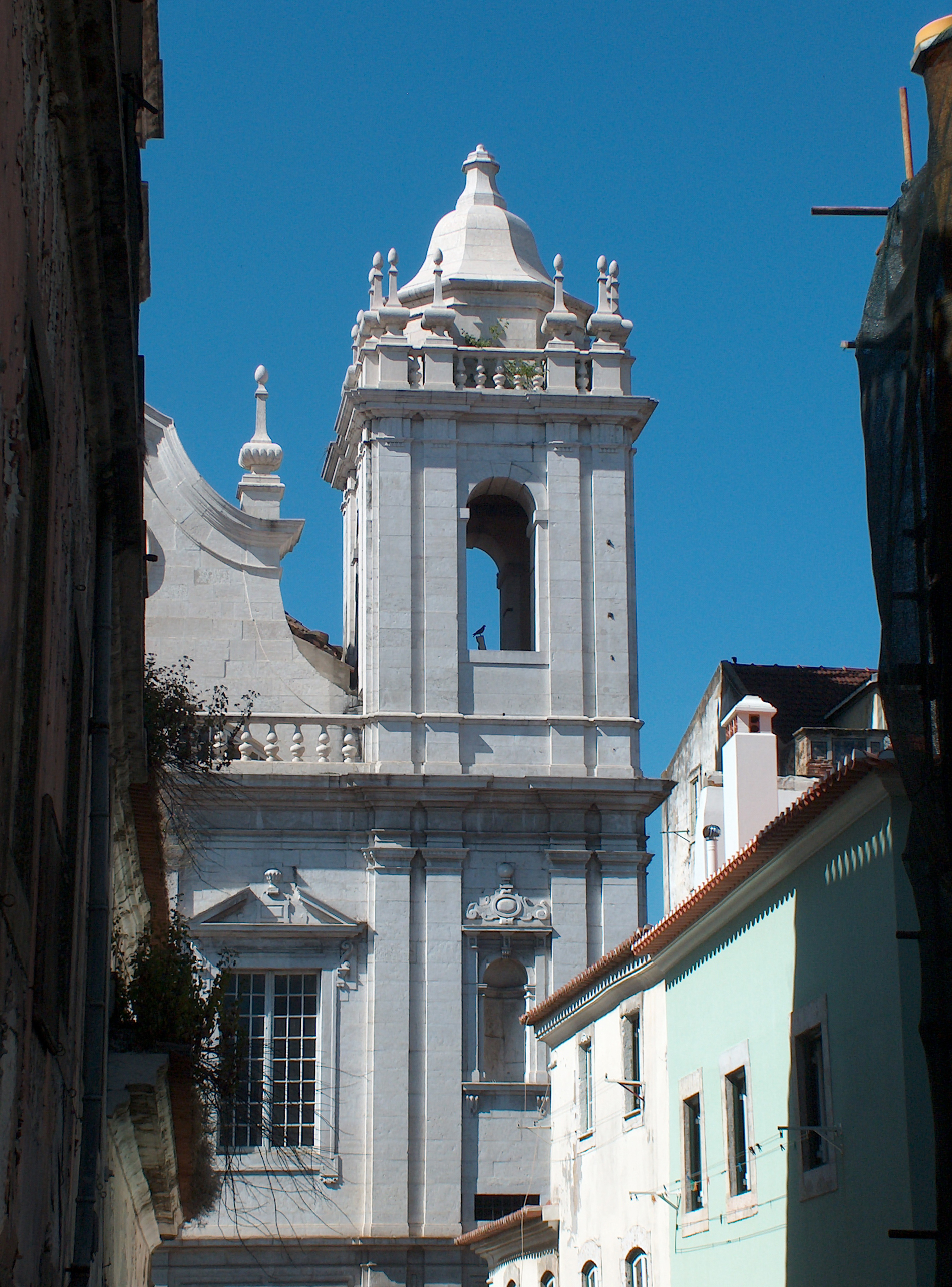
Church of Saint Catherine of Alexandria peeking from between the 18th Century buildings of the Santa Catarina quarter of Lisbon

The civil parish was instituted in on October 9, 1559, when it was de-annexed from the neighbouring parishes of Loreto (which later became Encarnação and Mártires, and included a stretch of land descending from Principe Real to Boavista. Its territory was one of the more extensive urban areas and, until the end of the 20th Century, one of the most populous. Its history was linked to Portuguese discoveries in the 14th and 15th Century, and is characterized by a diverse historical, sociological and cultural influence that mingled the aristocratic and popular.

The administrative limits have suffered successive alterations, the last of which (1959) caused controversy by removing many of the emblematic infrastructures of the parish. This included, specifically, the de-annexation of the area around the Miradouro do Alto de Santa Catarina, an area considered a historical link to the areas past, and which provided in the 16th-17th Centuries assisted the patrol of the Tejo River.

Many figures linked to the cultural or political life of the city (and the country) lived for a time in the parish, including Sebastião José de Carvalho e Melo, Manuel Maria Barbosa du Bocage, Almeida Garrett, Alexandre Herculano and Camilo Castelo Branco. Also, in 1847 (on Rua de São Boaventura) Maria Amália Vaz de Carvalho was born (and also lived and died), a champion of women's rights, who affirmed,

"The women have power. It is necessary to take advantage of them in the works of our common civilization. It is necessary, before everything transforms the education of the woman. The first thing that a woman did not learn is that she should learn and think. Dominate her destiny, modify it when it is convenient, because a faculty can just have those whom rationalize and those who know."

== Geography ==
The parish is part of a mountainous area, part of the Bairro Alto, that descends south toward the Tejo, and west to toward the parish of São Bento, cutting the Calçada do Combro, supposedly the principal roadway in the formation of Lisbon, and where today is concentrated the largest group of architecturally significant buildings in the region. In the northern part of the parish is a scattering of small shops, artesian businesses, typo-graphs with a long tradition of influence on political life, bistros and coffee shops, while closer to the river, there are fewer businesses.

== Architecture ==
Santa Catarina is home to a rich heritage of historical architecture. Most of the buildings are representative of the 18th Century-style construction, while many religious sanctuaries have longer histories.

=== Civic ===
- Palácio Pombal (English: Pombal Palace) (IPA Monument Class. PT031106280172)
- Palácio do Cunhal das Bolas (English: Cunhal das Bolas Palace)
- Palácio dos Condes de Mesquitela (English: Palace of the Counts of Mesquitela) (IPA Mounument Class. PT031106280171)
- Palácio Flor da Murta (English: Flor da Murta Palace) (IPA Monument Class. PT031106280226)
- Chafariz da Rua do Século (English: Século Road Fountain)
- Palácio Cabral (English: Cabral Palace) (IPA Monument Class. PT031106280068)
- Edifício Lançada - Edifício de "O Século" (English: O Século Building) (IPA Mounument Class. PT031106280255)
- Palácio Paiva de Andrade (English: Paiva de Andrade Palace)
- Palácio Braamcamp (English: Braacamp Palace) (IPA Monument Class. PT031106281027)
- Palácio Perry Linde (English: Perry Linde Palace)
- Palácio dos Marqueses das Minas (English: Marquis of Minas Palace) (IPA Monument Class. PT031106280516)
- Palácio Marim Olhão (English: Marim Olhão Palace)
- Palácio dos Marqueses de Ficalho (English: Marquis de Ficalho's Palace) (IPA Monument Class. PT031106280515)

=== Religious ===
- Igreja da Santa Catarina (English: Church of Saint Catherine) (IPA Monument Class. PT031106280036)
- Ermida dos Fiéis de Deus (English: Chapel of God's Faithful)
- Ermida da Ascensão de Cristo (English: Chapel of Christ Assumption)
- Convento dos Inglesinhos (English: Convent of the English) - (IPA Monument Class. PT031106280422) also known as the Colégio de São Pedro e São Paulo (English: Ecclesiastical College of Saints Peter and Paul)
- Convento dos Caetanos (English: Caetanos Road Convent) - (IPA Monument Class. PT031106280715) home to the Conservatório Nacional (English: National Conservatory)

== Notable citizens ==
- Sebastião José de Carvalho e Melo (13 May 1699 – 8 May 1782) - 1st Count of Oeiras, 1st Marquis of Pombal, 18th Century Portuguese statesman, Minister of the Kingdom in the government of Joseph I of Portugal from 1750 to 1777; the most prominent government official, de facto head of government, notable for his leadership in the aftermath of the 1755 Lisbon earthquake, who implemented sweeping economic policies to regulate commercial activity and standardize quality, and instrumental in the weakening of the Inquisitionin Portugal;
- Manuel Maria Barbosa du Bocage (15 September 1765 — 21 December 1805) was a Neoclassic poet, who wrote under the pen name Elmano Sadino and is generally known for his baudy, rude prose;
- Almeida Garrett (4 February 1799 — 9 December 1854) a poet, playwright, novelist and politician; considered to have introduced the Romanticism to Portugal, with his epic poem Camões, based on the life of Luís de Camões;
- Alexandre Herculano (28 March 1810 – 13 September 1877), was a novelist, historian and a constitutional Liberal with convictions on political Catholicism and Christianity;
- Camilo Castelo Branco (16 March 1825 - 1 June 1890), was a prolific 19th Century writer, who authored over 260 books (mainly novels, plays and essays);
- Ramalho Ortigão (24 October 1836 - 27 September 1915), was a 19th-century writer, who at one time battled (physically and in prose) Antero de Quental and Questão Coimbrain modern literature, but later joined the Geração de 70 as it promoted Portuguese culture;
- Gonçalves Crespo (11 March 1846 – 11 June 1883), was a Brazilian-born poet, deeply informed by Parnassianism;
- Maria Amália Vaz de Carvalho (2 February 1847 - 24 March 1921) was a writer and feminist, who wrote short stories, essays, biographies, and literary criticism;
- Abel Manta (12 October 1888 - 9 August 1982), was an architect, painter, designer and cartoonist;
- António Quadros ( 14 July 1923 — 21 March 1993), was a philosopher, writer, translator and university professor.
