= São Vicente de Fora, Lisbon =

Former civil parish in Lisbon, Portugal

Coordinates: 38.42°N 9.07°W

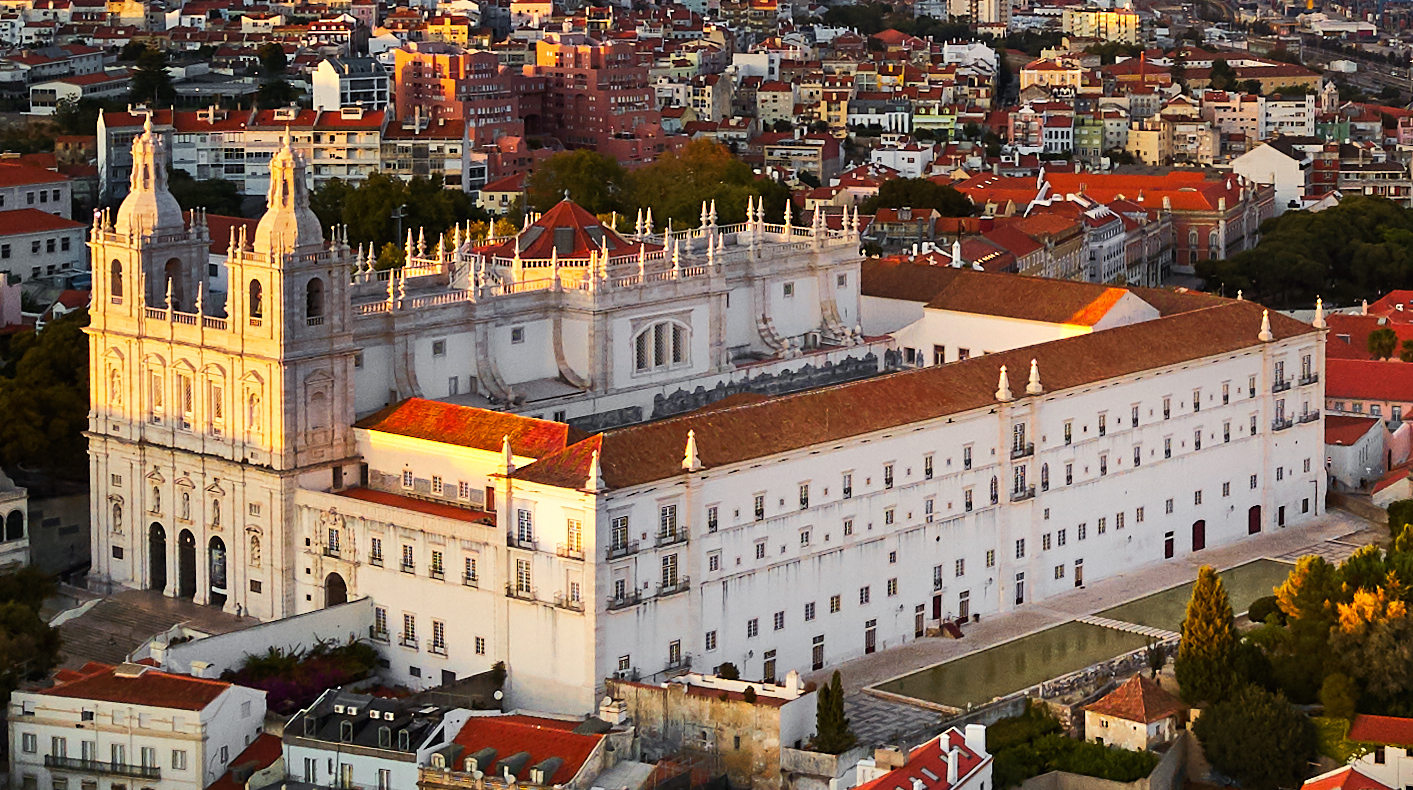
Monastery of São Vicente de Fora, Lisbon, Portugal

São Vicente de Fora (English: Saint Vincent Outside the Walls) is a former parish (freguesia) in the municipality of Lisbon, Portugal. At the administrative reorganization of Lisbon on 8 December 2012 it became part of the parish São Vicente. It has a total area of 0.31 km^{2} and total population of 4,267 inhabitants (2001); density: 13,853.9 inhabitants/km^{2}.

== Main sites ==
- Monastery of São Vicente de Fora
- Church of Santa Engrácia (National Pantheon)
