= Mercês, Lisbon =

Coordinates: 38.7125°N 9.14306°W

Mercês is a former parish (freguesia) in the municipality of Lisbon, Portugal. At the administrative reorganization of Lisbon on 8 December 2012 it became part of the parish Misericórdia. It has a total area of 0.30 km^{2} and total population of 5,093 inhabitants (2001); density: 16,808.6 inhabitants/km^{2}.

== Main sites ==
- The Guardian
