= São João de Brito, Lisbon =

São João de Brito
- Civil parish
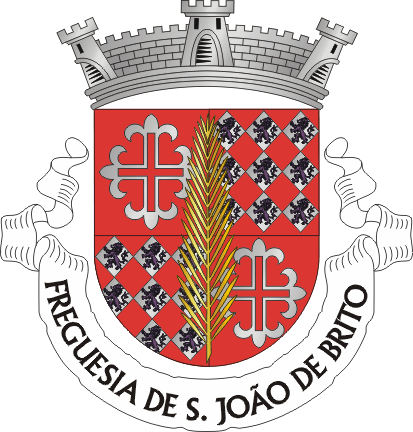
- Coat of arms

- Location in Portugal
- Coordinates: 38.45°N 9.08°W
- Country: Portugal
- Region: Lisbon
- Metropolitan area: Lisbon
- District: Lisbon
- Municipality: Lisbon
- Disbanded: 2012

Area
  - Total: 2.28 km^{2} (0.88 sq mi)

Population (2001)
  - Total: 13,449
  - Density: 5,900/km^{2} (15,000/sq mi)
- Time zone: UTC+00:00 (WET)
  - Summer (DST): UTC+01:00 (WEST)
- Website: http://www.jf-sjbrito.pt/

São João de Brito (English: Saint John de Britto) was a Portuguese parish (freguesia) in the municipality of Lisbon. It was created on February 7, 1959, and named after the saint John de Britto. At the administrative reorganization of Lisbon on 8 December 2012 it became part of the parish Alvalade.

== Main sites ==
- São João de Brito Church
- Júlio de Matos Hospital
- Laboratório Nacional de Engenharia Civil (National Civil Engineering Laboratory)
- Saint Anthony of Lisbon's Statue
