= Santo Condestável, Lisbon =

Santo Condestável
- Civil parish
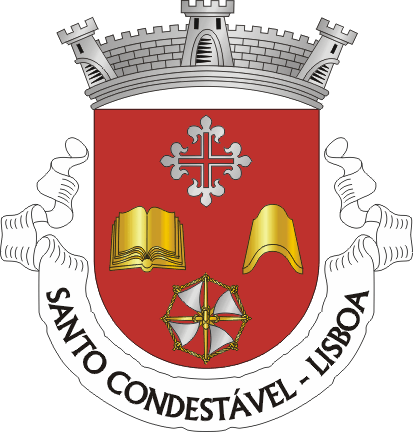
- Coat of arms

- Location in Portugal
- Coordinates: 38.42°N 9.10°W
- Country: Portugal
- Region: Lisbon
- Metropolitan area: Lisbon
- District: Lisbon
- Municipality: Lisbon
- Disbanded: 2012

Area
  - Total: 1.01 km^{2} (0.39 sq mi)

Population (2001)
  - Total: 17,553
  - Density: 17,000/km^{2} (45,000/sq mi)
- Time zone: UTC+00:00 (WET)
  - Summer (DST): UTC+01:00 (WEST)
- Website: www.jf-santocondestavel.pt (not working)

Santo Condestável (English: the Saint Constable) is a former parish (freguesia) in the municipality of Lisbon, Portugal. At the administrative reorganization of Lisbon on 8 December 2012 it became part of the parish Campo de Ourique.

== Main sites ==
- Santo Condestável Church
