= Coração de Jesus, Lisbon =

Coração de Jesus
- Civil parish
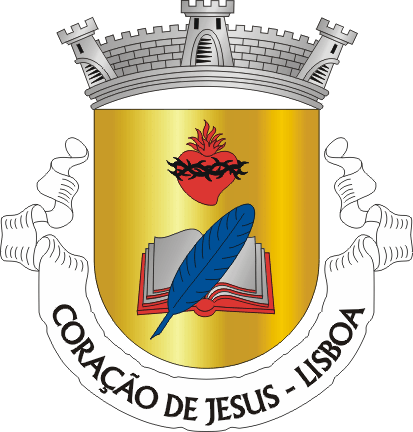
- Coat of arms

- Location in Portugal
- Coordinates: 38.43°N 9.08°W
- Country: Portugal
- Region: Lisbon
- Metropolitan area: Lisbon
- District: Lisbon
- Municipality: Lisbon
- Disbanded: 2012

Area
  - Total: 0.54 km^{2} (0.21 sq mi)

Population (2001)
  - Total: 4,319
  - Density: 8,000/km^{2} (21,000/sq mi)
- Time zone: UTC+00:00 (WET)
  - Summer (DST): UTC+01:00 (WEST)

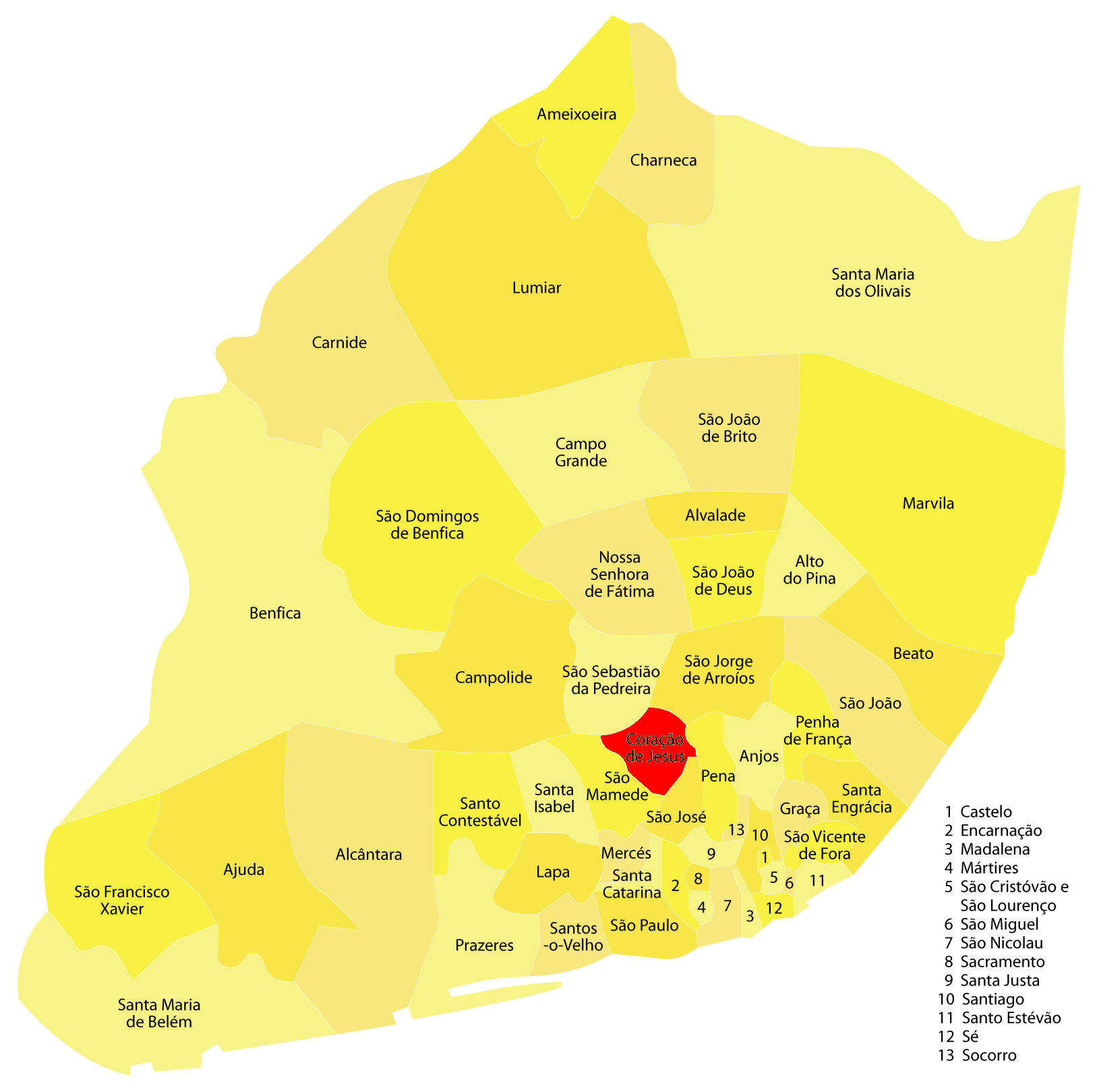
Lisbon map: location of the parish

Coração de Jesus (English: Heart of Jesus) is a former civil parish (freguesia) in the municipality of Lisbon, Portugal. It was created on February 11, 1770. At the administrative reorganization of Lisbon on 8 December 2012 it became part of the parish Santo António.
