= Santo Estêvão, Lisbon =

Santo Estêvão
- Civil parish
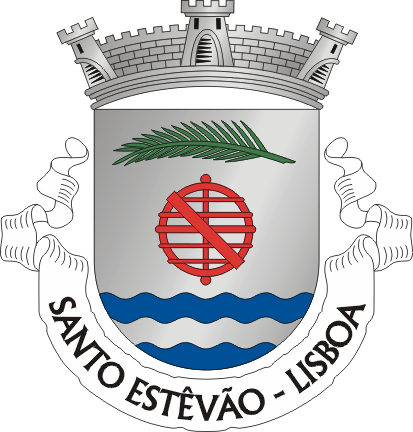
- Coat of arms

- Location in Portugal
- Coordinates: 39.02°N 9.00°W
- Country: Portugal
- Region: Lisbon
- Metropolitan area: Lisbon
- District: Lisbon
- Municipality: Lisbon
- Disbanded: 2012

Area
  - Total: 0.18 km^{2} (0.069 sq mi)

Population (2001)
  - Total: 2,047
  - Density: 11,000/km^{2} (29,000/sq mi)
- Time zone: UTC+00:00 (WET)
  - Summer (DST): UTC+01:00 (WEST)
- Website: http://www.jf-santoestevao.pt/

Santo Estêvão (English: Saint Stephen) is a former parish (freguesia) in the municipality of Lisbon, Portugal. At the administrative reorganization of Lisbon on 8 December 2012 it became part of the parish Santa Maria Maior.

== Main sites ==
- Santo Estêvão Church
- Nossa Senhora dos Remédios Chapel
- Azevedo Coutinho Palace
- Condes de Balsemão Palace
- Military Museum
- Santa Apolónia Station
- ISPA - Instituto Universitário
