= São Paulo, Lisbon =

São Paulo
- Civil parish
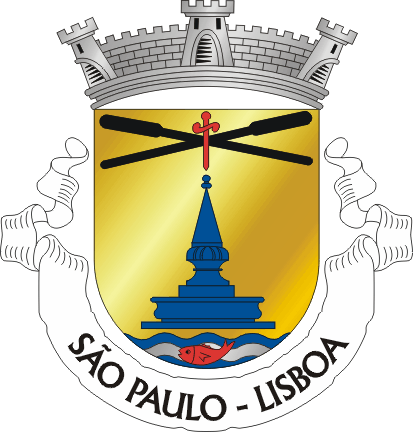
- Coat of arms

- Location in Portugal
- Coordinates: 38.42°N 9.08°W
- Country: Portugal
- Region: Lisbon
- Metropolitan area: Lisbon
- District: Lisbon
- Municipality: Lisbon
- Disbanded: 2012

Area
  - Total: 0.41 km^{2} (0.16 sq mi)

Population (2001)
  - Total: 3,521
  - Density: 8,600/km^{2} (22,000/sq mi)
- Time zone: UTC+00:00 (WET)
  - Summer (DST): UTC+01:00 (WEST)

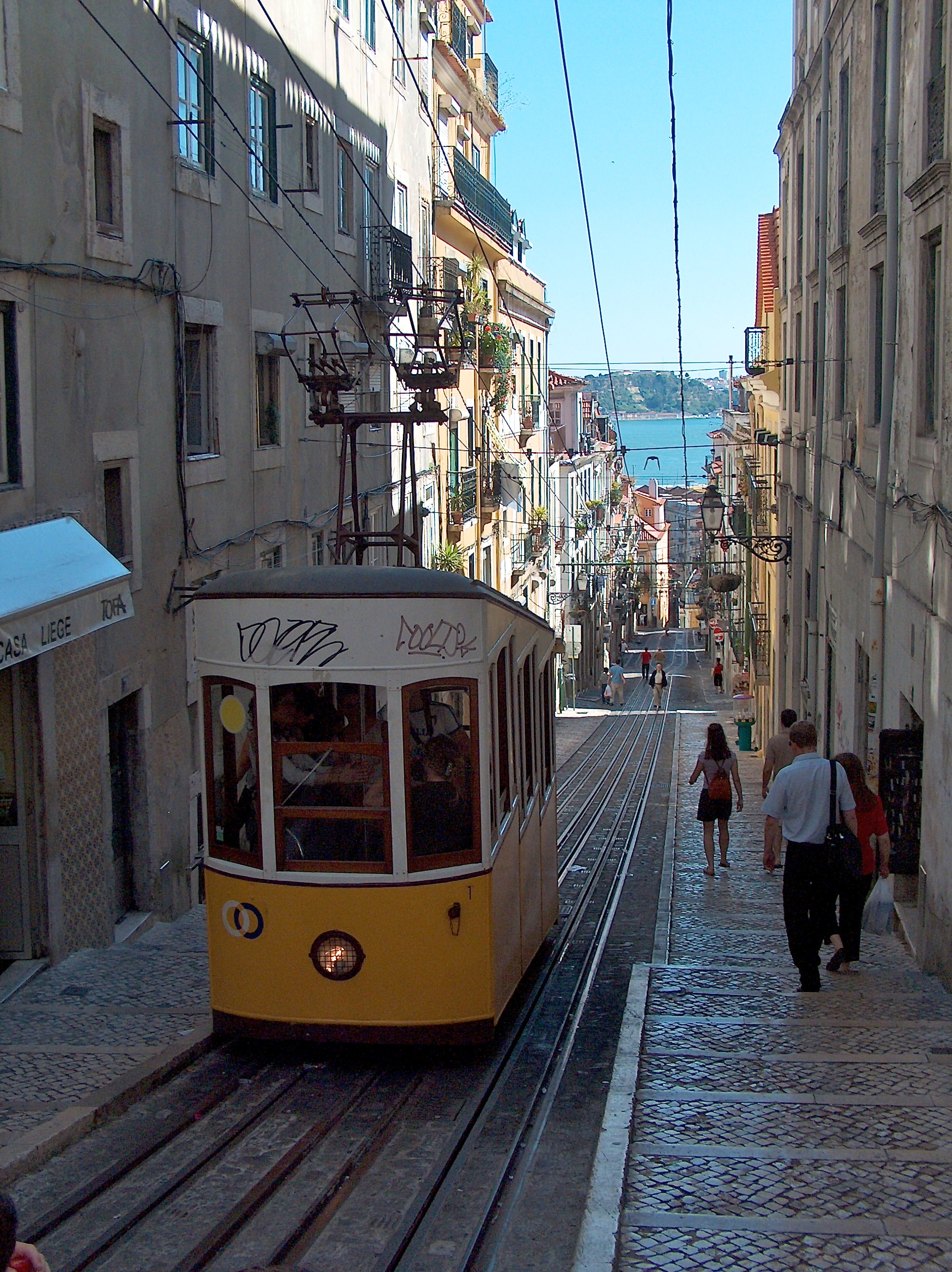
Bica funicular

São Paulo (English: Saint Paul) is a former parish (freguesia) in the municipality of Lisbon, Portugal. At the administrative reorganization of Lisbon on 8 December 2012 it became part of the parish Misericórdia.

== Main sites ==
- Valada-Azambuja Palace
- Almada – Carvalhais Palace
- Alvito Palace
- Sandomil Palace
- Chagas Palace
- Corpo Santo Church
- Igreja de São Paulo
- Cais do Sodré Station
- 24 de Julho Market
