= Santa Isabel, Lisbon =

Santa Isabel
- Civil parish
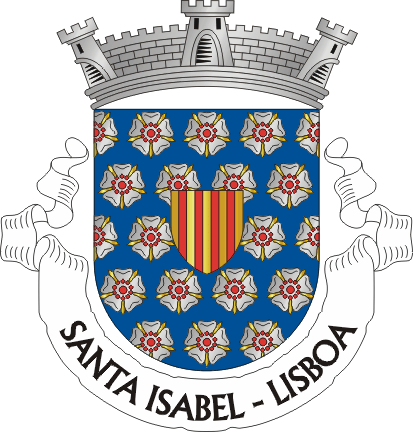
- Coat of arms

- Location in Portugal
- Coordinates: 38.43°N 9.09°W
- Country: Portugal
- Region: Lisbon
- Metropolitan area: Lisbon
- District: Lisbon
- Municipality: Lisbon
- Disbanded: 2012

Area
  - Total: 0.62 km^{2} (0.24 sq mi)

Population (2001)
  - Total: 7,270
  - Density: 12,000/km^{2} (30,000/sq mi)
- Time zone: UTC+00:00 (WET)
  - Summer (DST): UTC+01:00 (WEST)
- Website: http://www.jf-santaisabel.pt/main.php

Santa Isabel (English: Saint Elizabeth) is a former parish (freguesia) in the municipality of Lisbon, Portugal. At the administrative reorganization of Lisbon on 8 December 2012 it became part of the parish Campo de Ourique. It was created on May 14, 1741, by Cardinal Tomás de Almeida.

== Main sites ==
- Pedro Álvares Cabral Statue
- Condes de Anadia Palace
