= Encarnação, Lisbon =

Encarnação
- Civil parish
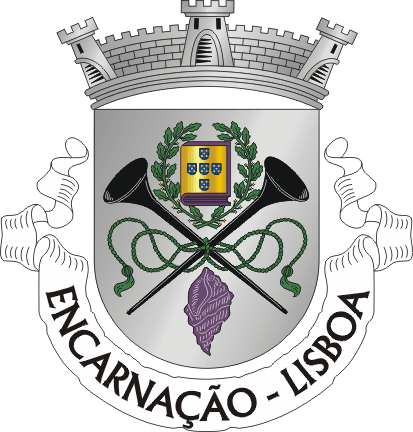
- Coat of arms

- Location in Portugal
- Coordinates: 38.7125°N 9.14306°W
- Country: Portugal
- Region: Lisbon
- Metropolitan area: Lisbon
- District: Lisbon
- Municipality: Lisbon
- Disbanded: 2012

Area
  - Total: 0.15 km^{2} (0.058 sq mi)

Population (2001)
  - Total: 3,182
  - Density: 21,000/km^{2} (55,000/sq mi)
- Time zone: UTC+00:00 (WET)
  - Summer (DST): UTC+01:00 (WEST)

Encarnação (English: Incarnation) is a former parish (freguesia) in the municipality of Lisbon, Portugal. At the administrative reorganization of Lisbon on 8 December 2012 it became part of the parish Misericórdia.

== Main sites ==
- Bairro Alto

== See also ==
- Procession of Our Lord of the Passion of Graça
