= Monument to the Fallen in the Great War =

Monument in Lisbon, Portugal

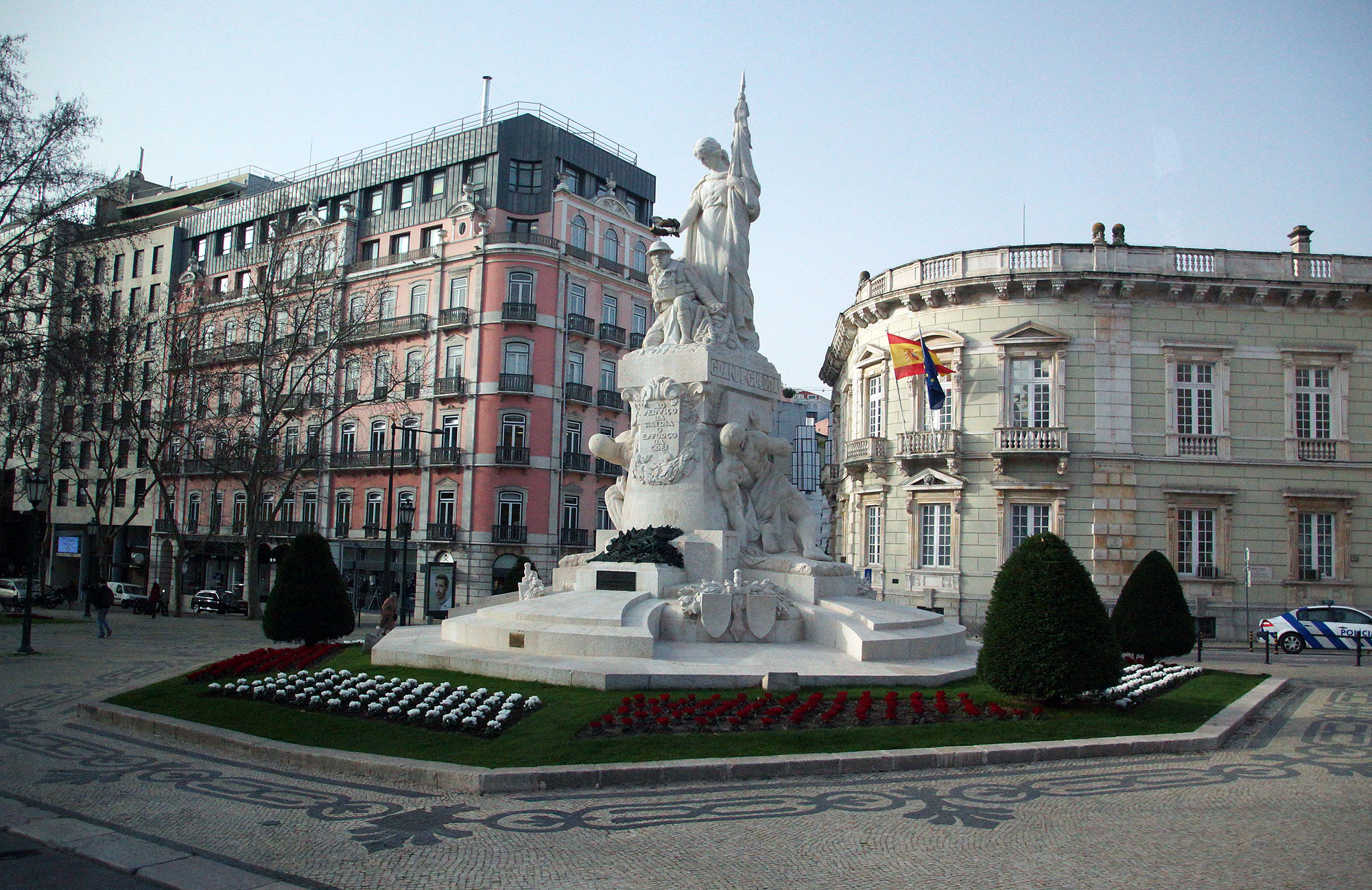
- The monument in 2017.
- Interactive map of Monument to the Fallen in the Great War
- Location: Liberty Avenue, Santo António, Lisbon, Portugal
- Coordinates: 38°43′10″N 09°08′43″W
- Designer: Guilherme Rebelo de Andrade; Carlos Rebello de Andrade; Maximiano Alves
- Type: Statue
- Material: Stone, bronze
- Beginning date: 9 April 1923
- Opening date: 22 November 1931

The Monument to the Fallen in the Great War (Portuguese: Monumento aos Mortos da Grande Guerra), also known as the Monument to the Combatants of the Great War (Portuguese: Monumento aos Combatentes da Grande Guerra), is a monument in Lisbon, Portugal, within the civil parish of Santo António, at Liberty Avenue, near the intersection with Salitre Street. It is dedicated to the soldiers of the Portuguese Army, that died during the First World War. The monument was designed by Guilherme Rebelo de Andrade, Carlos Rebello de Andrade, and Maximiano Alves, and unveiled on 22 November 1931.

== History ==
In April 1920, there was set up a national commission with the purpose of erecting a monument dedicated to the Portuguese soldiers that died in the First World War. The monument was designed by architects Guilherme Rebelo de Andrade and Carlos Rebello de Andrade, and the sculptures by Maximiano Alves. The groundbreaking was held on 9 April 1923, when President of Portugal, António José de Almeida, laid the first stone. It was unveiled on 22 November 1931, in the presence of the President of Portugal, Óscar Carmona, and the Mayor of Lisbon, José Vicente de Freitas.

== Characteristics ==
The monument is placed at Liberty Avenue, near the intersection with Salitre Street. It is made from white stone, features a personification of the Fatherland, in form of a man in robes and bearing flag, crowning a soldier of the Portuguese Army, that kneels in front of it, with a bronze laurel wreath. They are placed on a large stone pedestal, with a shield at the front, that bears the following inspiration: "Ao serviço da Pátria, o esforço da Grei". It is a quote of poet Augusto Casimiro, which translates from Portuguese to "In the service of the Fatherland, the effort of its People". Each side of the pedestal feature large inscription that reads: "Grande Guerra", meaning the "Great War". On the sides of the pedestal are, two large stone figures of men, bent under the main part of the monument, symbolising their strive to keep the Fatherland standing. At the base in front of pedestal is a bronze sculpture of military equipment, such as gas masks, helmets, ammunition belts, bags, etc.

== Gallery ==
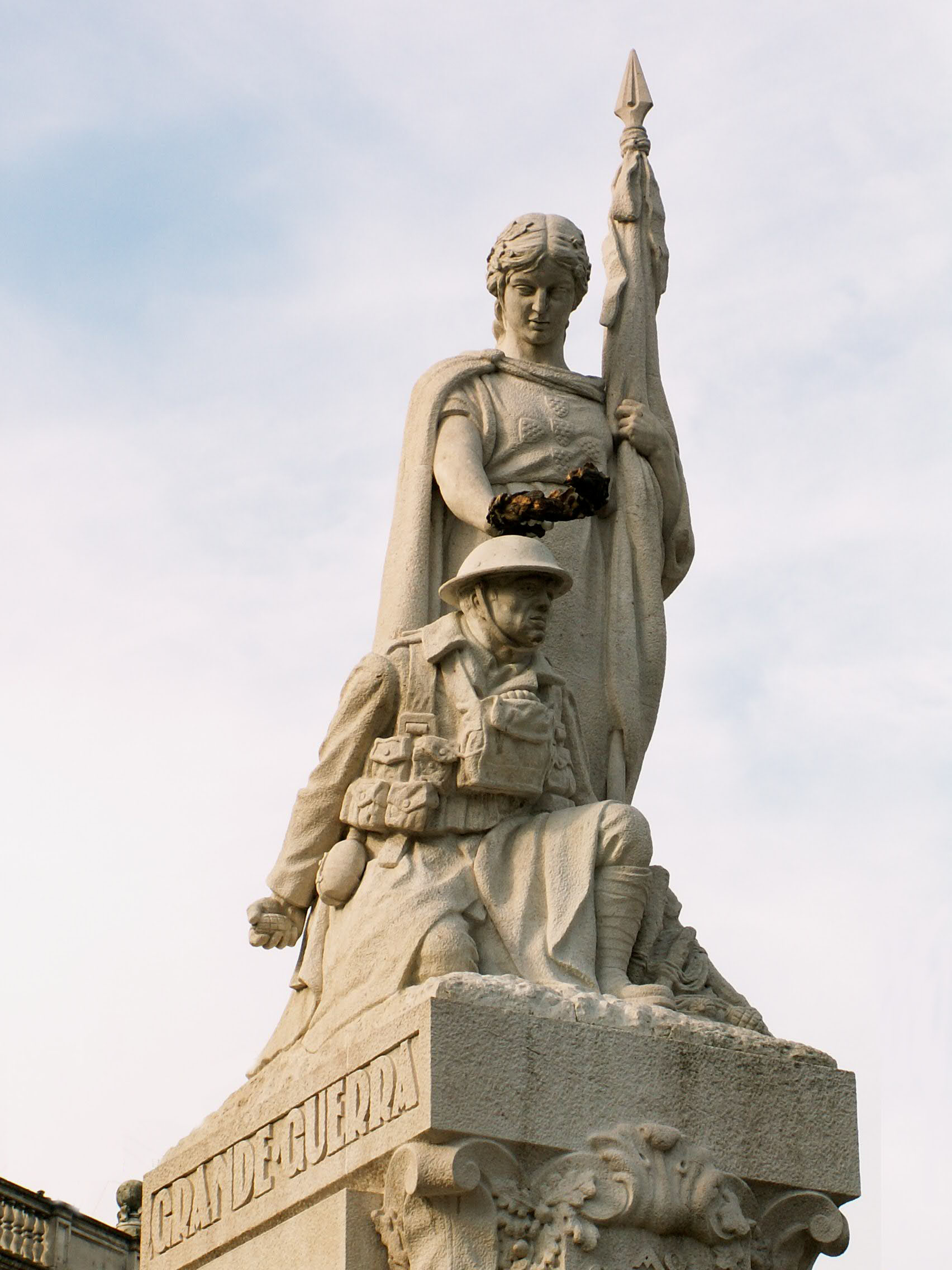
The statue on the pedestal.

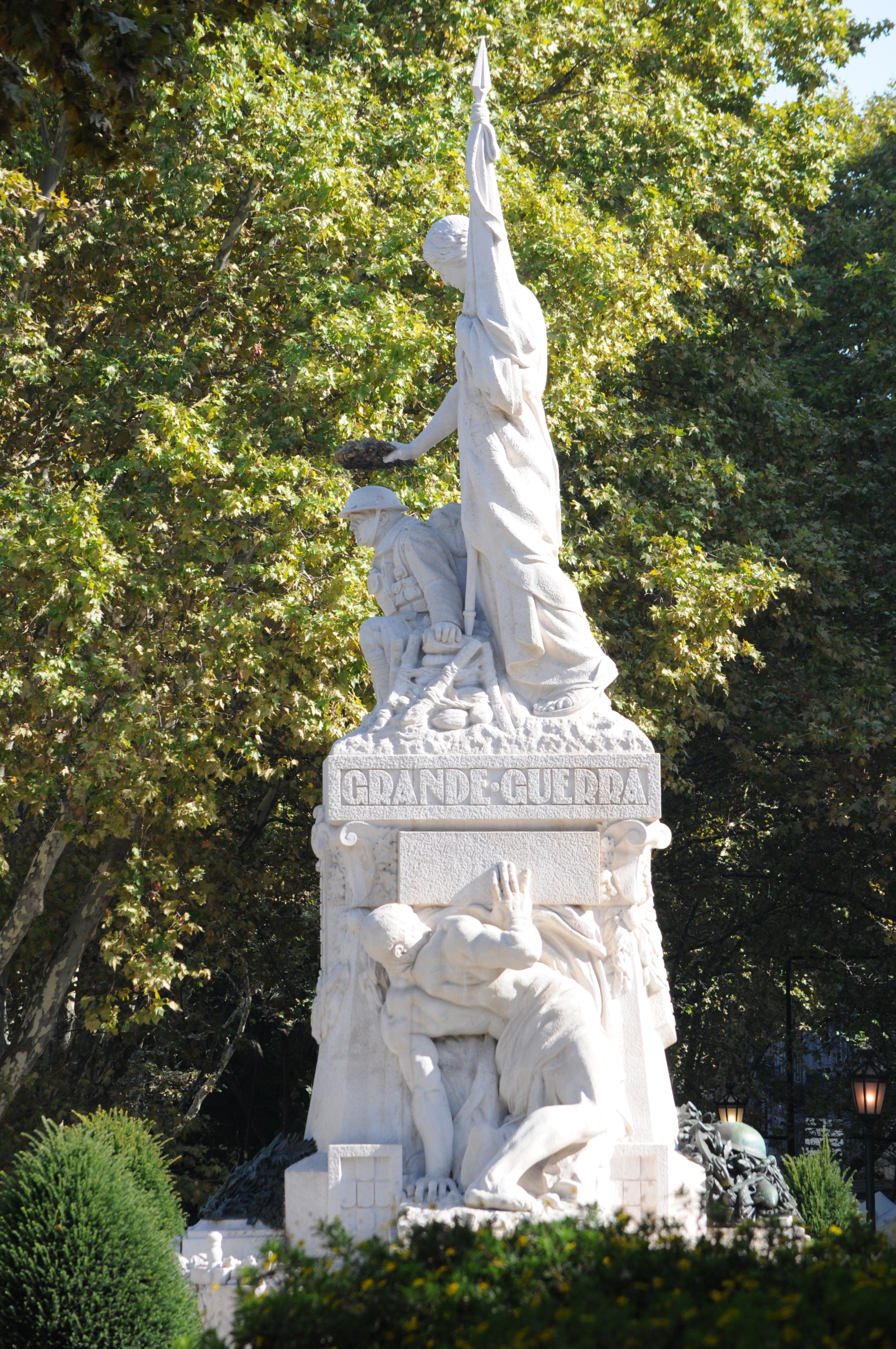
The monument from the left side.

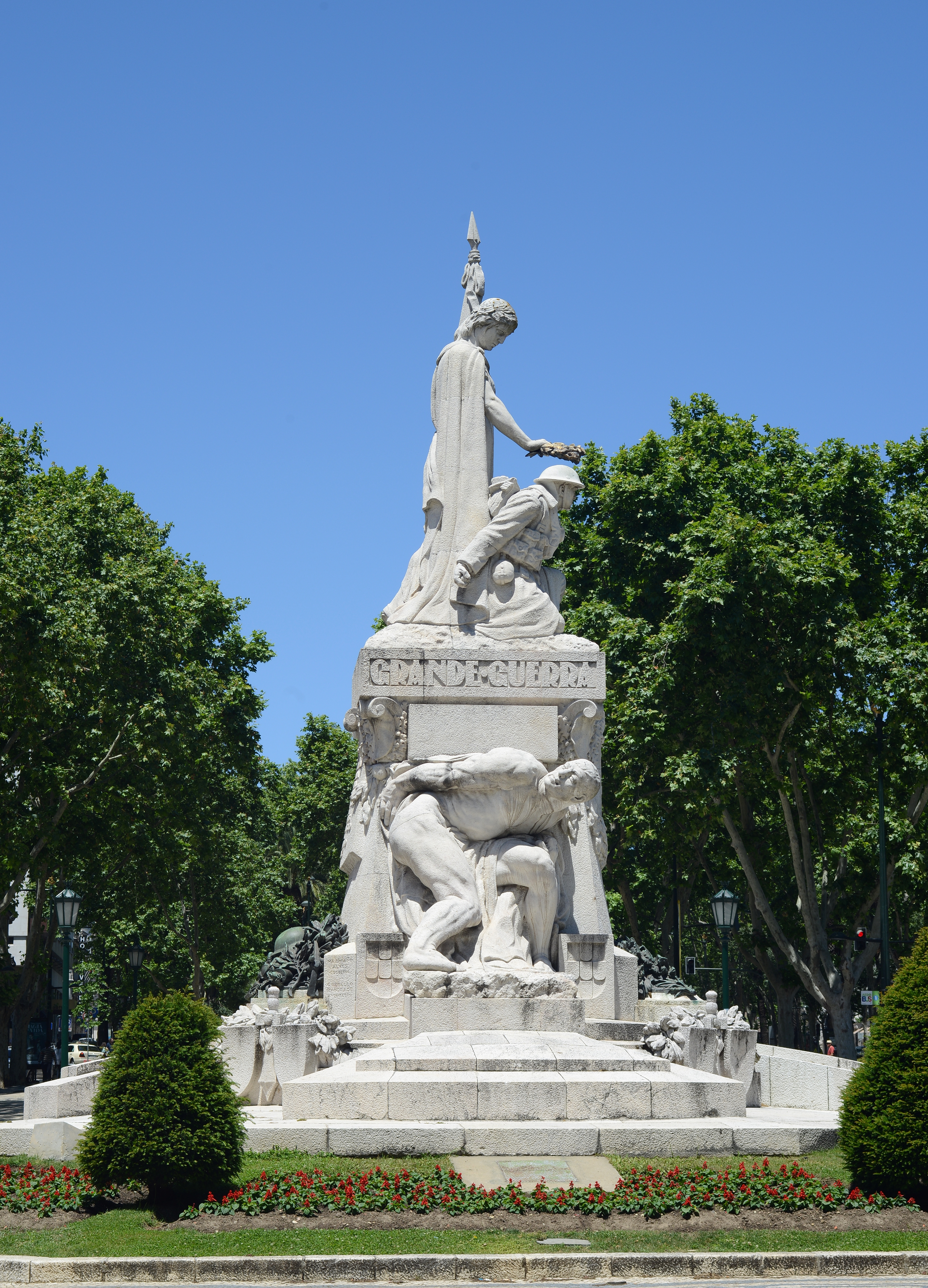
The monument from the right side.

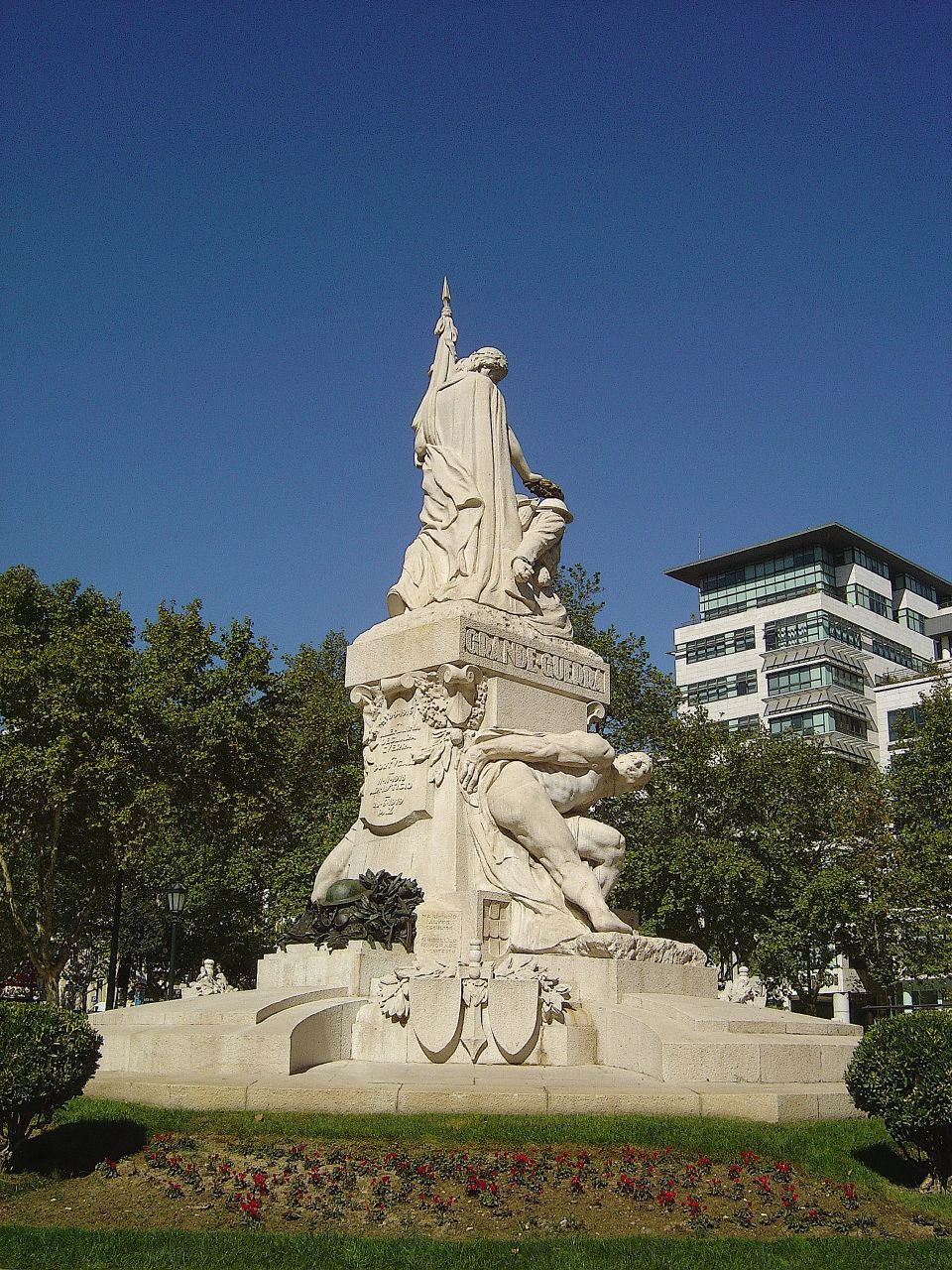
The monument from the back.

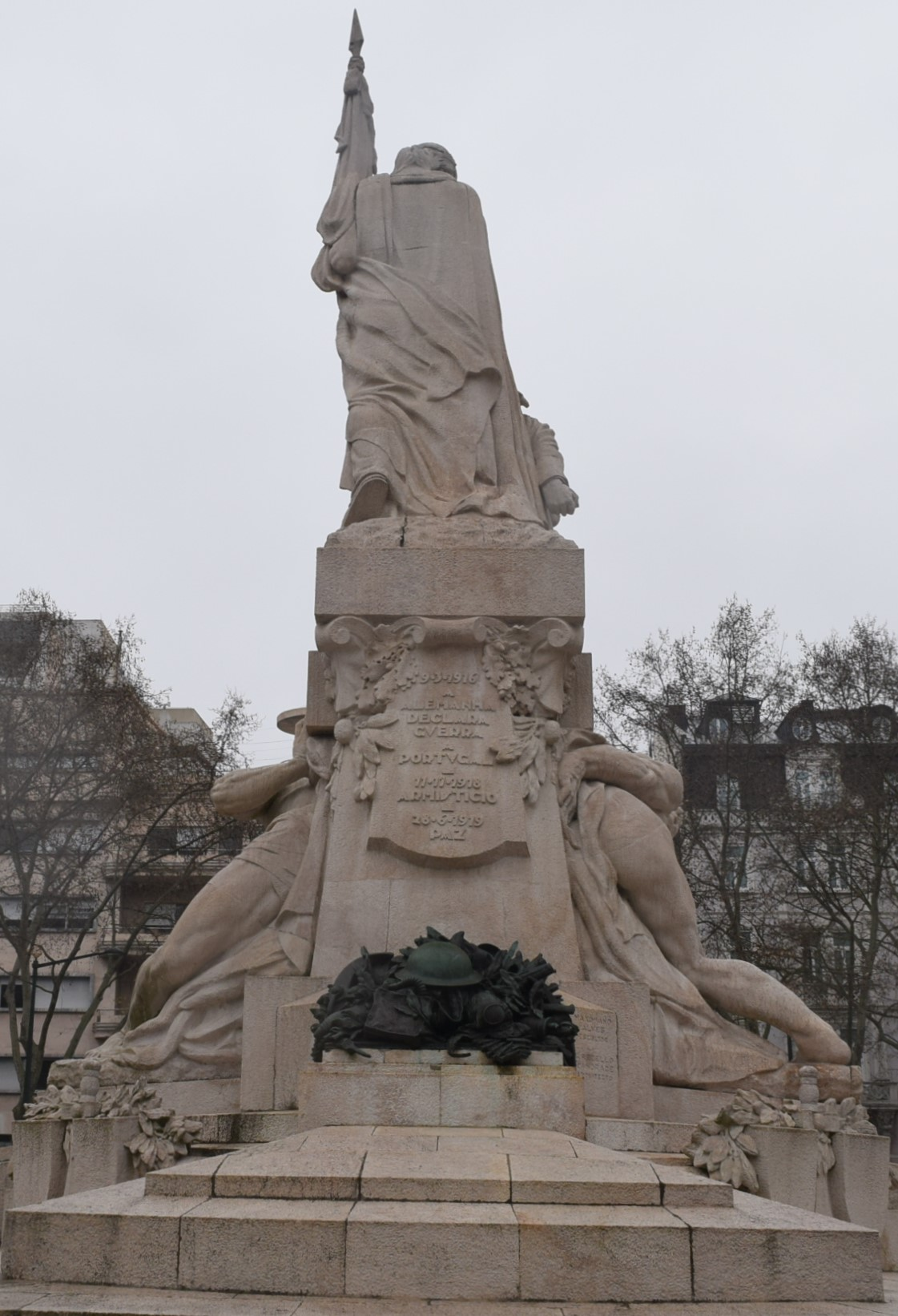
The monument from the back.

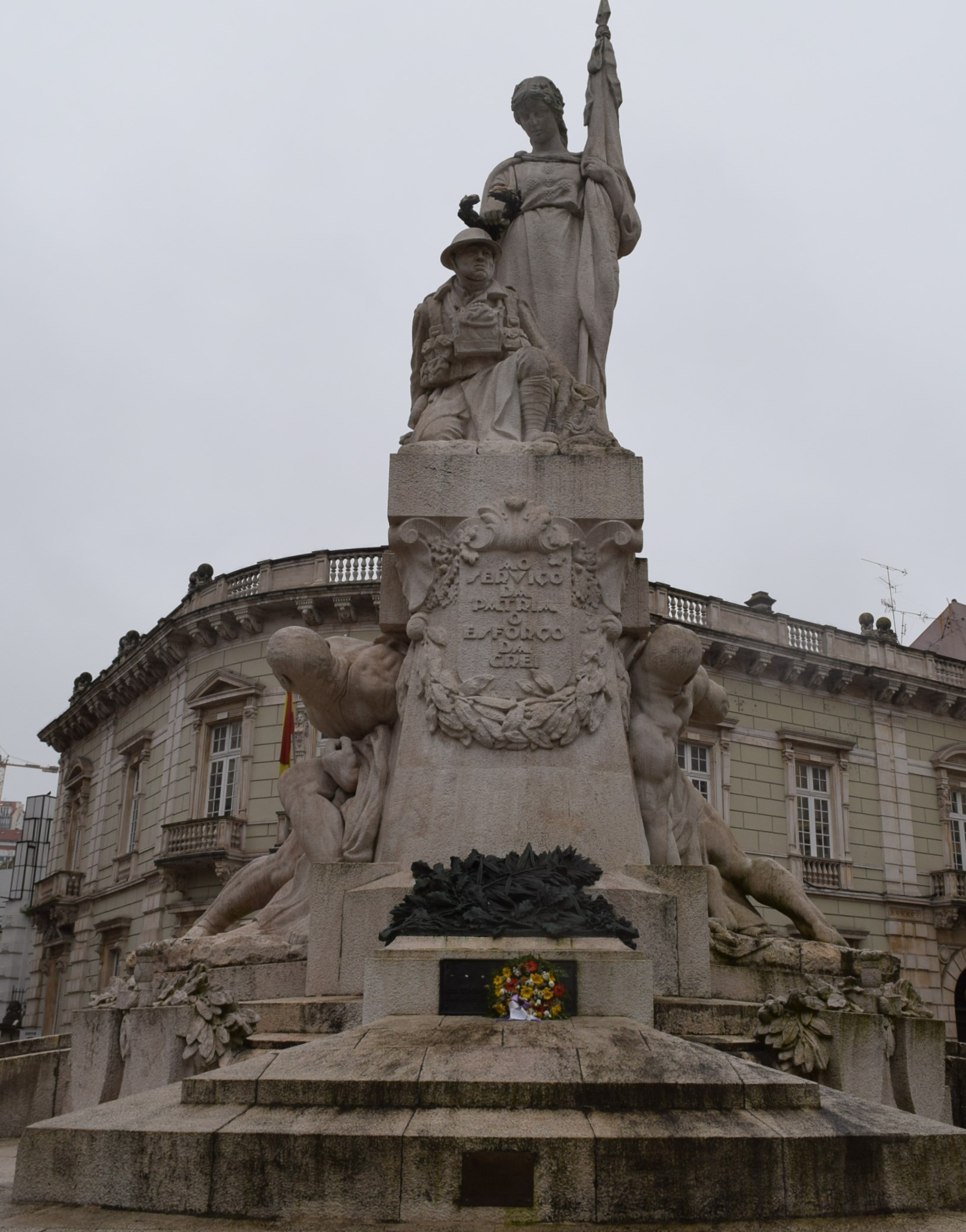
The monument from the front.

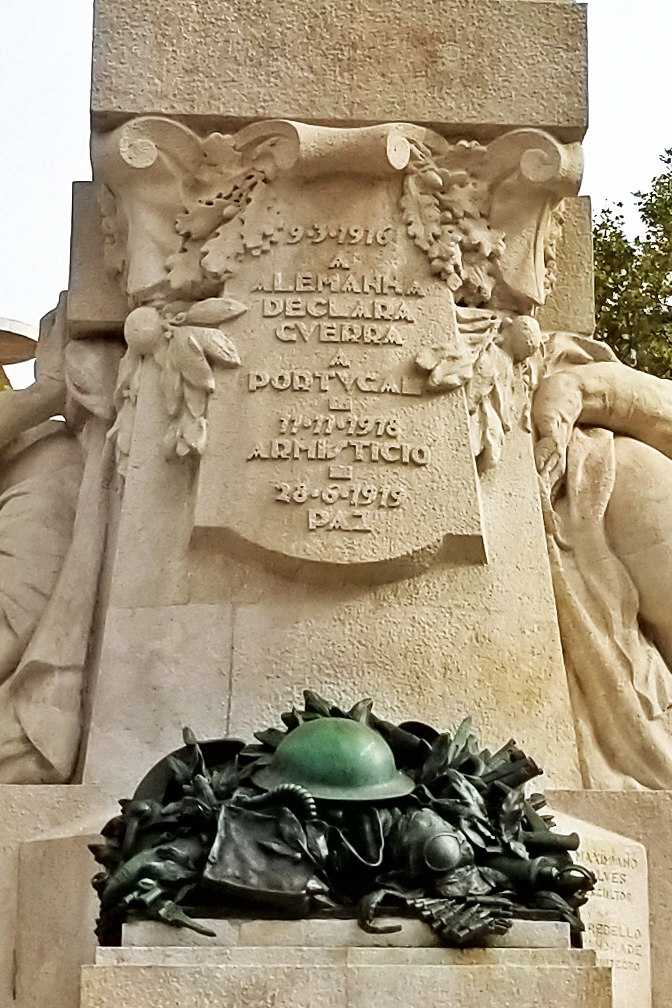
The shield with an inspiration at the back of the monument.
