= Passeio Público =

Passeio Público (Public Park) is the name for various parks in the Portuguese-speaking world.

- Passeio Público (Lisbon)
- Passeio Público (Rio de Janeiro)
