= Edward VII Park =

Park in Lisbon, Portugal

- Parque Eduardo VII
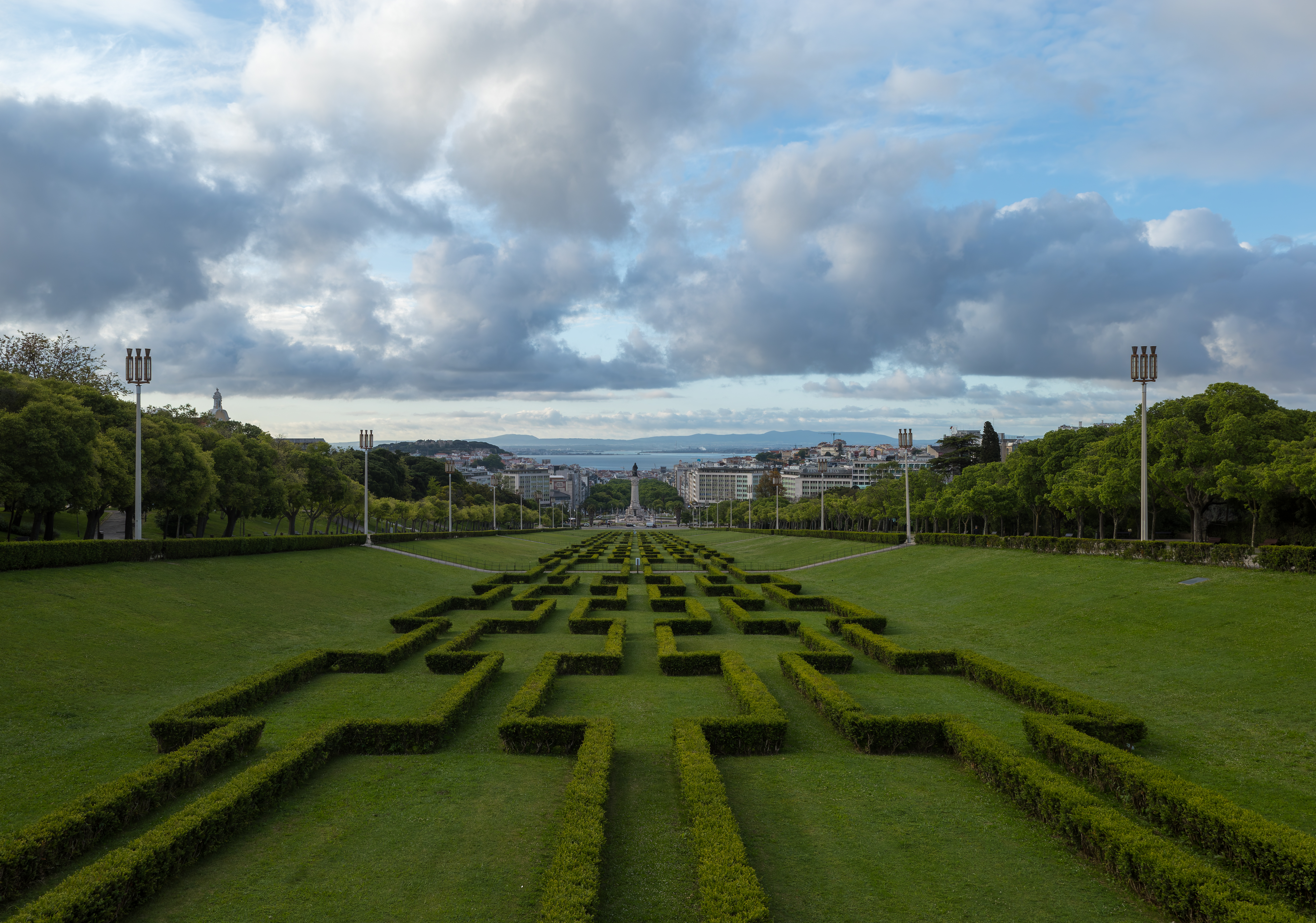
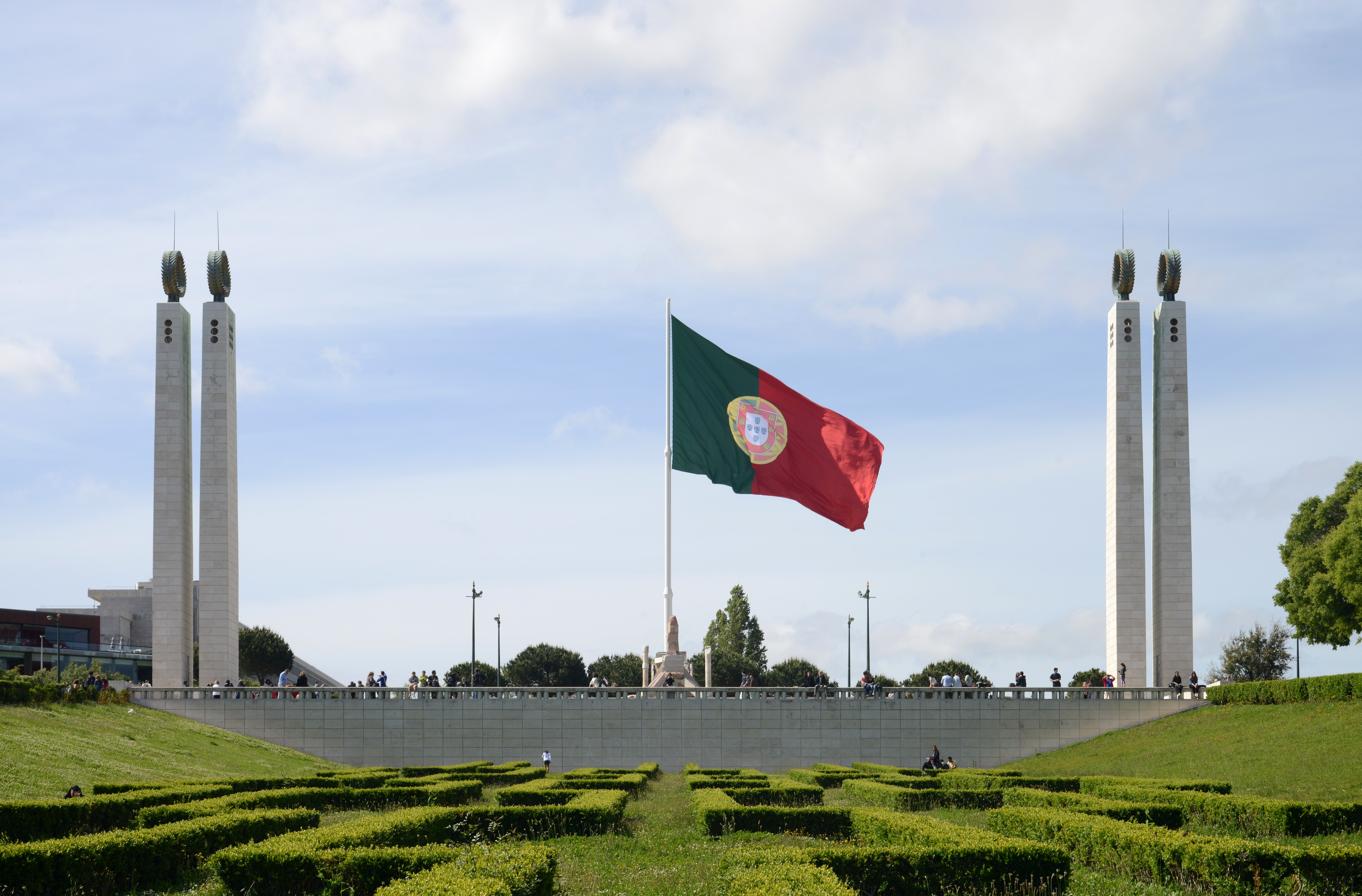
- The central lane of Edward VII Park, with Lisbon and the Tagus river in the background

- Location within Lisbon
- Type: Municipal
- Location: Santo António, Lisbon
- Coordinates: 38°43′42″N 9°09′10″W
- Area: 26 hectares (64 acres)
- Etymology: Edward VII of the United Kingdom, who visited in 1903
- Status: Open all year
- Public transit: Parque; Marquês de Pombal
- Website: www.golisbon.com/sight-seeing/edward-park.html

Edward VII Park (Portuguese: Parque Eduardo VII) is a public park in Lisbon, Portugal. The park occupies an area of 26 hectares (64 acres) to the north of Avenida da Liberdade and Marquis of Pombal Square in Lisbon's city center. The park is named for King Edward VII of the United Kingdom, who visited Portugal in 1903 to strengthen relations between the two countries and reaffirm the Anglo-Portuguese Alliance. The Lisbon Book Fair is held annually in Edward VII Park.

== History ==
The park was built in the first half of the 20th century to restore public green space formerly occupied by Passeio Público, which was destroyed to make way for Avenida da Liberdade in 1879. The park was built on land belonging to the nearby ecclesiastical parish of São Sebastião da Pedreira, and was known as Parque da Liberdade (Liberty Park) until the name was changed following Edward VII's visit. In 1945, Portuguese Modernist architect Francisco Keil do Amaral redesigned the park to its current configuration.

== Facilities ==
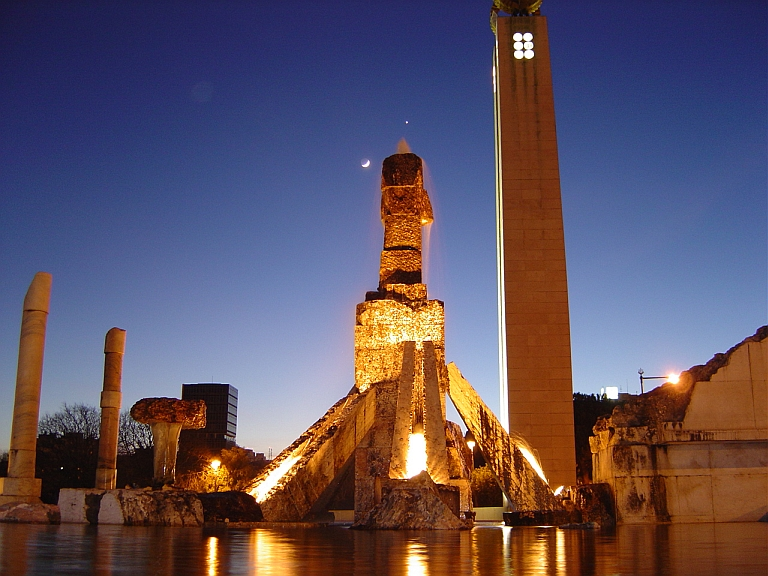
Monument to the Carnation Revolution

The park's central strip, covered with grass, is flanked by long Portuguese paved walkways, dividing the park into two green, tree-lined zones. In the northwest corner of the park, on the site of an old basalt quarry, is the Estufa Fria—a 1.5-hectare (3.7-acre) greenhouse, with a variety of exotic plants, streams, waterfalls, palm trees, fuchsias, banana trees, and the Hot Greenhouse with lush plants, cacti as well as tropical birds.

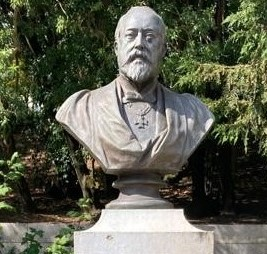
Bust of King Edward VII

Near the greenhouses is a lake with large carp and a children's playground, shaped like a galleon. On the east side is the current Carlos Lopes Pavilion, the former Portuguese pavilion at the 1922 Rio de Janeiro International Exposition, renamed in honor of the winner of the 1984 Olympic marathon.

The northern end of the park is a monumental viewpoint where the Monument to the Carnation Revolution was erected, flanked by two sets of two obelisks inspired by the original design of the park. The monument was designed by João Cutileiro and was the subject of much controversy due to its phallic shape. The monument sites next door to the Amália Rodrigues Garden, which pays homage to the Portuguese fadista. The largest Portuguese flag in the world is usually flown at the park's northern end.
