= Palacete Mayer =

- Palacete Mayer
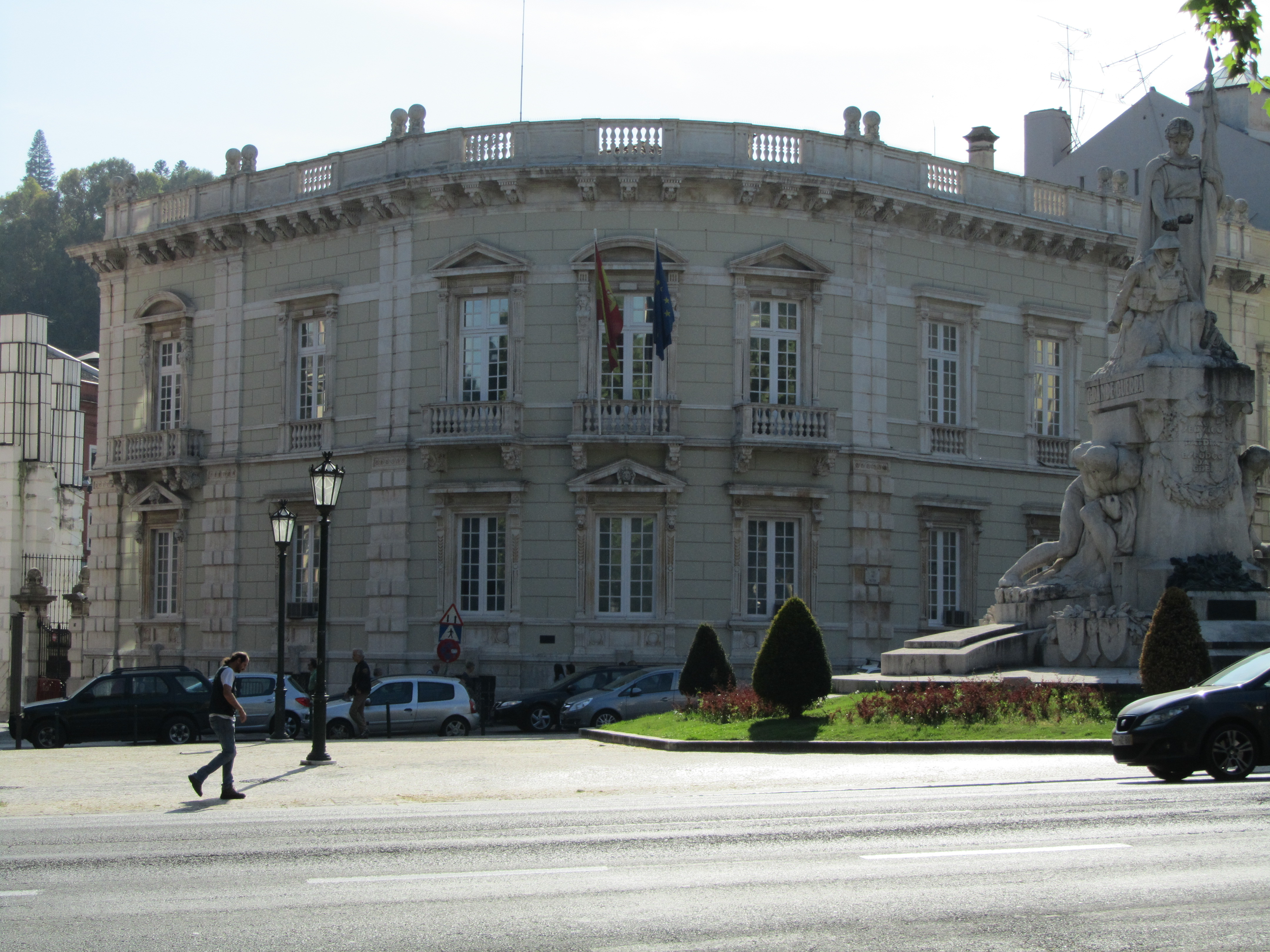
- The palacette at the corner of Rua do Salitre and Travessa do Salitre, today the administrative entrepot of the Embassy of Spain
- Interactive map of the Palacete Mayer area

General information
- Type: Residence
- Location: Santo António, Lisbon, Portugal
- Coordinates: 38°43′09″N 09°08′44″W
- Opened: 1899
- Owner: Portuguese Republic

Technical details
- Material: Mixed masonry

Design and construction
- Architect: Nicola Bigaglia

The Palacete Mayer ([pɐlɐˈsetɨ ˈmajɐɾ], "Little Palace of the Mayers"; sometimes referred to as the Lima Mayer Palace) is a Portuguese eclectical residence situated in the civil parish of Santo António, municipality of Lisbon. In the 20th century, it was acquired by the Spanish government and became the Embassy of Spain in Portugal.

== History ==
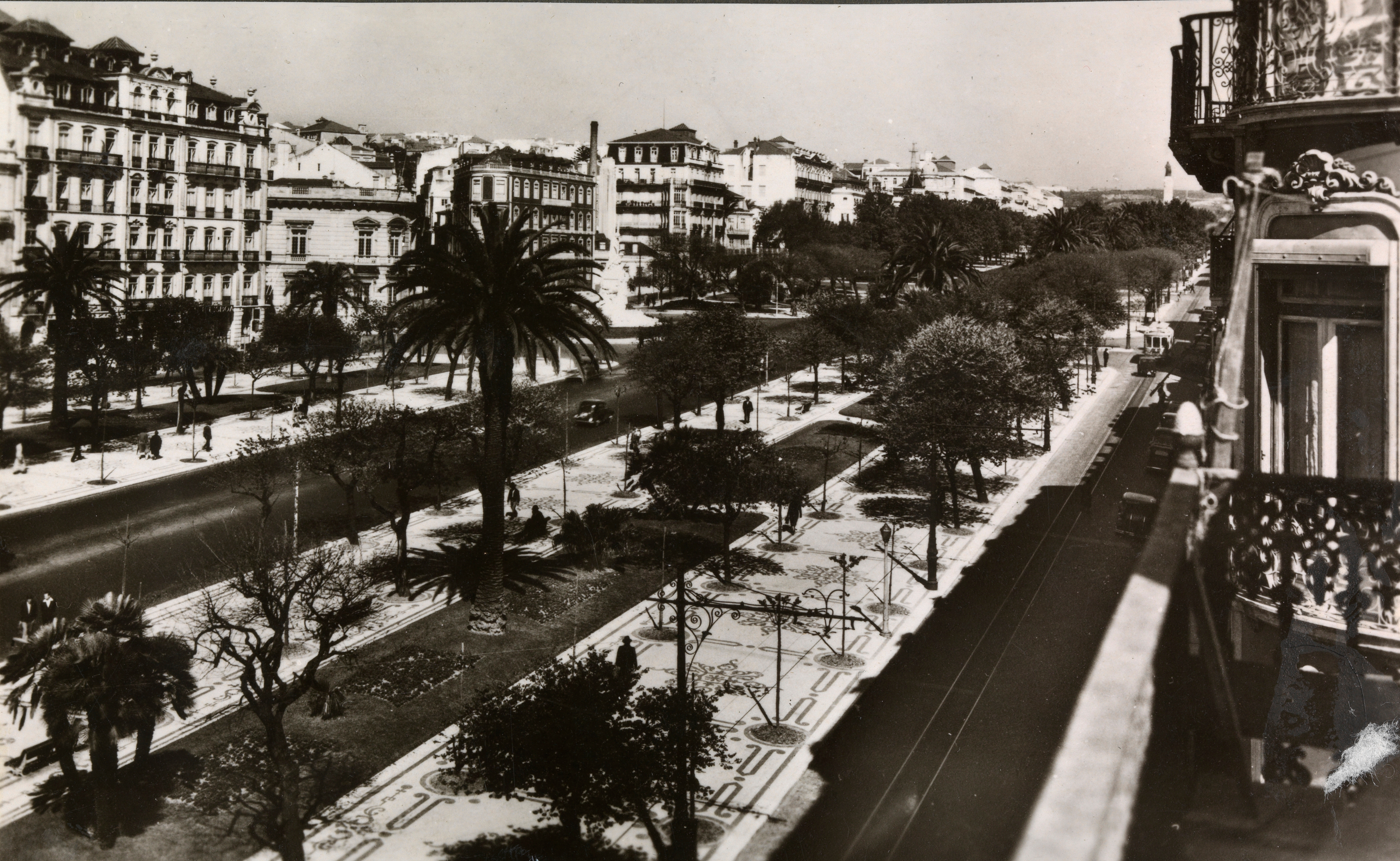
A view along the Avenida da Liberdade, with corner of the Palacette Mayer (second from the left)

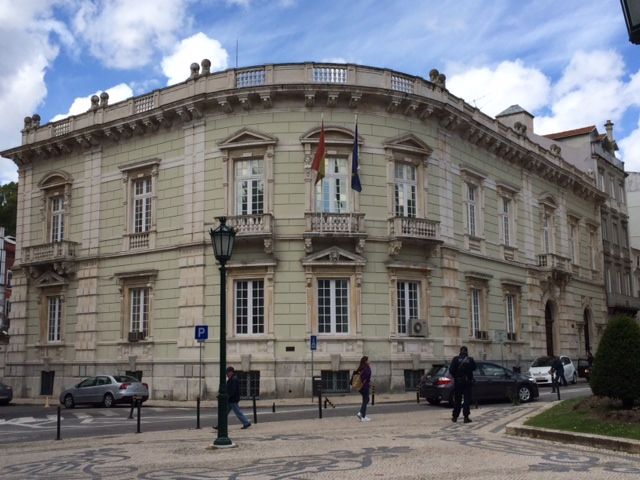
The principal facade of the Mayer Palace/Embassy of Spain

The project by Nicola Bigaglia, approved in 1899 (after its presentation to the municipal council of Lisbon) for Adolfo de Lima Mayer, began construction partially from existing funds. Bigaglia, an Italian architect who worked in Portugal at the turn of the century, situated the project along the Avenida da Liberdade.

In 1902 the building received the Valmor Prize (its inaugural recipient); the sum of 1.802$850 reis was divided between the property-owner and architect, who donated his part of the prize to the municipal council of Lisbon, for public works to benefit the construction.

In 1923, the Avenida Palace Clube was installed within the building by its owners, the firm of Júlio de Resende Lda., who expanded the terrace. A couple of years earlier the palace was landscaped and a garden installed: the Parque Mayer, along with the altering of the walls. Seven years later, the administrative services of the Spanish Embassy began to function from the palacette, after the building was acquired by the Spanish State: in 1945, there were changes internally to the former-residence, by architect António de Mesa Ruiz Mateos. Changes and repairs to the building were carried out in 1950, 1965, 1971 and 1988.

On 22 December 1989, the Secretary of State for Culture, opened a process (DR293) to classify the building.

== Architecture ==
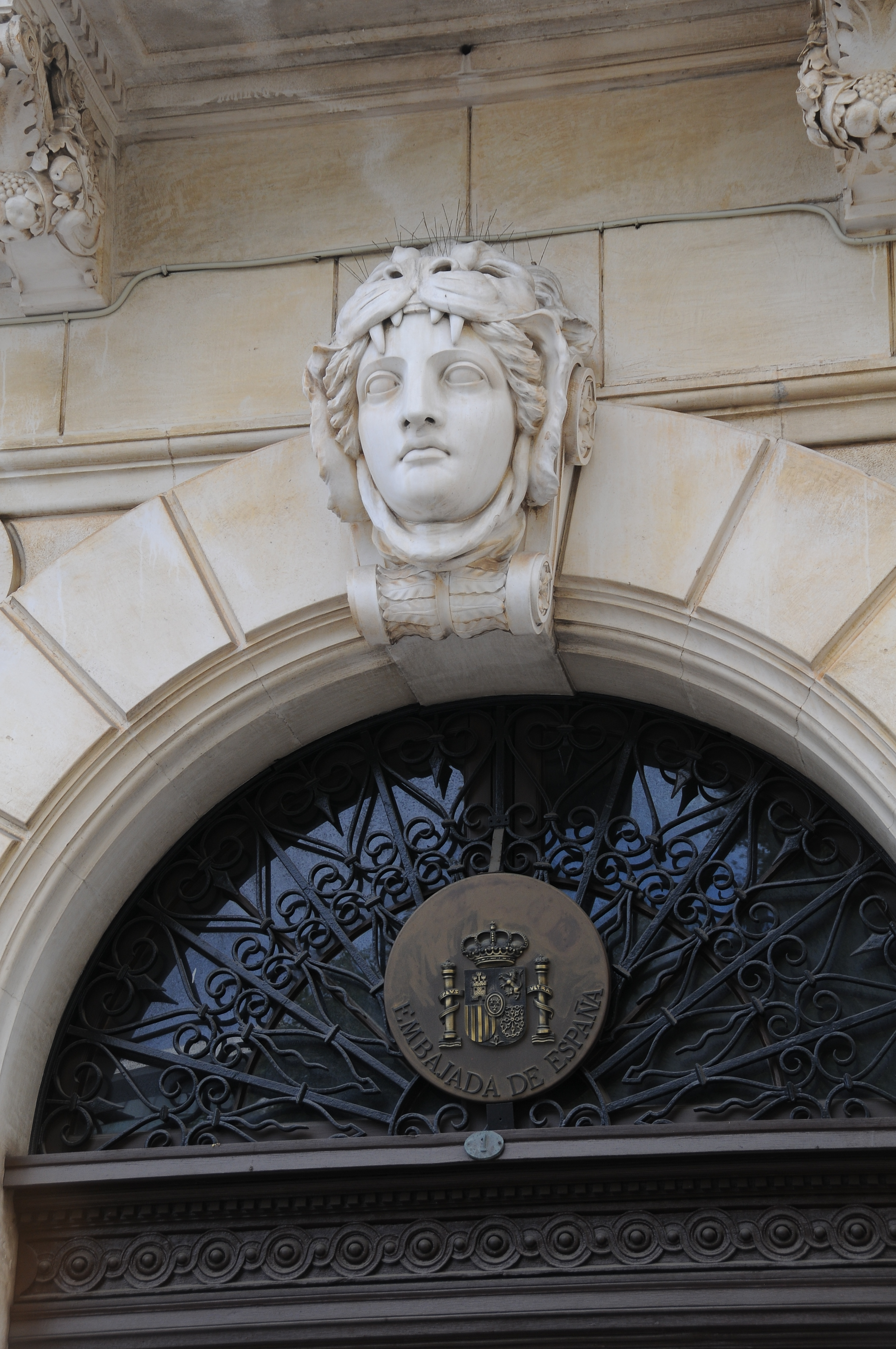
Detail of the sculpted form of a head of a woman, with mask of a lion, over one of the windows in the northeast of the building

The rectangular building plan, consists of three floors separated by friezes and decorated by differing stonework.

The main elevation in the east, consists of six bodies, separated by pilasters, characterized by the type of treatment: simulating a rustic ground floor and turning into double pilasters on the upper floor. With open spans and regular rhythm, the bodies are differentiated by different fenestration sculptures. The standard windows on the ground floor are framed by straight lintels, as are the bay windows on the 1st floor, with similar framing. The windows on the first floor are served by varandas, with balustrade, surmounted by triangular and rounded plinths.

The two bodies to the northeast, include doorway with rounded arch, while some window plinths are decorated with a head of a woman, with the mask of a lion, while the royal arms of Spain appear on the extreme northeast body. These are surmounted, respectively, by windows decorated in founded frontispiece, supported by anthropomorphic ledges, and served by a varanda an balustrade with plinths.

At the extreme body, the door is flanked by two narrow windows crowned and surmounted by two windows, with varanda and balustrade. The facade is surmounted by a cornice supported by corbels adorned with acanthus leaves, preceding a simple articulated parapet with balustrade.

The internal spaces are partitioned and organized from two straight staircases (one main and one service), directly adjoining the rectangular compartments.
