= Lisbon Book Fair =

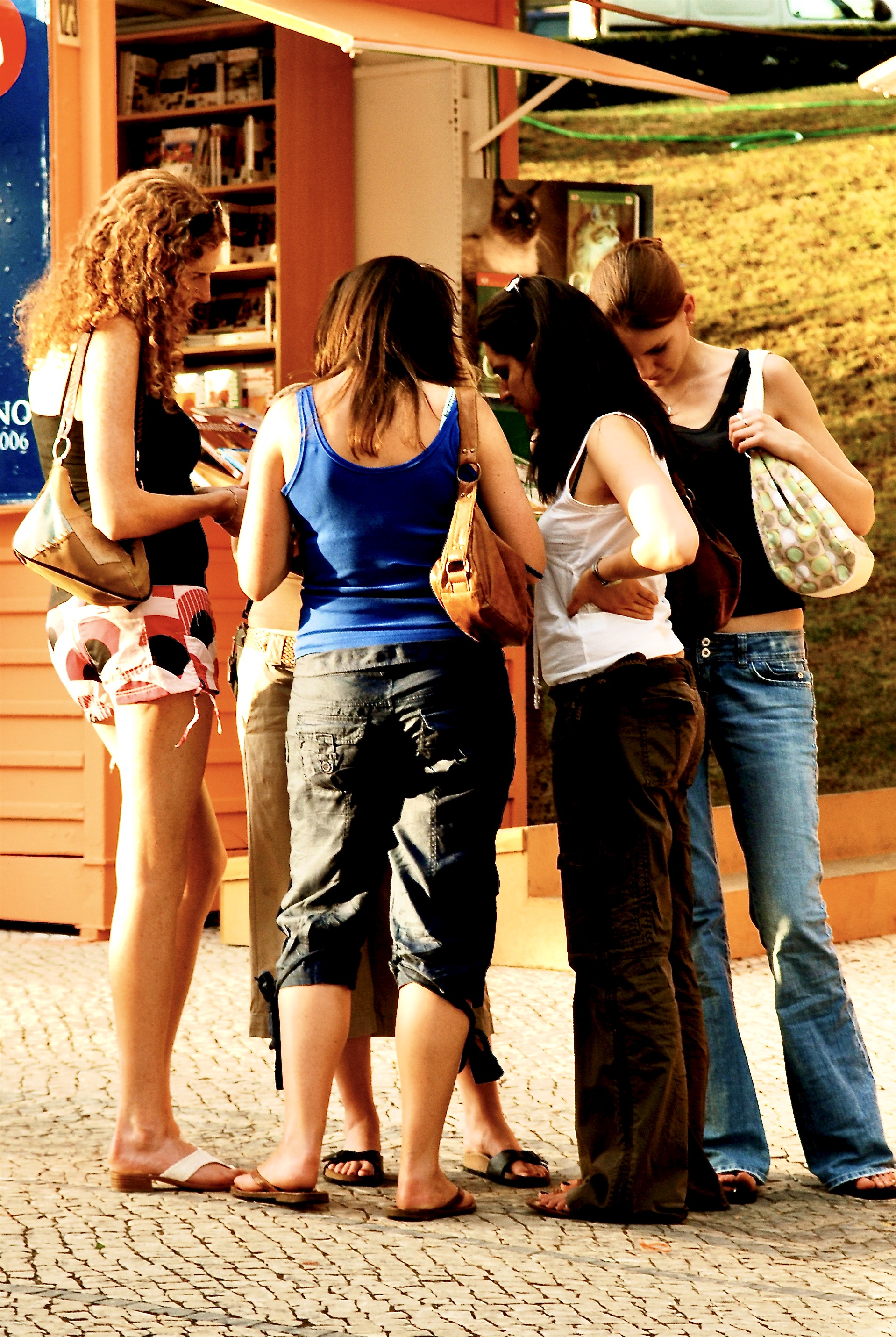
Girls at the Lisbon Book Fair, 2006

The Lisbon Book Fair (Portuguese: Feira do Livro de Lisboa) is a book fair held annually in Lisbon, Portugal. It is held at the Edward VII Park (Parque Eduardo VII).

The Lisbon Book Fair is one of the oldest cultural festivals held in the capital of Portugal. It was inaugurated in the 1930s, and its traditional location is the Edward VII Park, the largest park of Lisbon, which is located in the vicinity of the monumental Praça Marques de Pombal.

Exhibitors aside, the public can delight in reading through and buying old and rare volumes, as well as they can enjoy the advantages of the generous discounts of the prices occasioned by the fair. Most of the books (either old or new titles and authors) are in Portuguese, but there are, however, plenty of stalls showcasing publications in English, which might draw the interested of the English speaking people who don’t only want to sample the charm of the event, but also to take some rarities back home from their stay in Lisbon.

During the fair there are also, frequently, shows, concerts, book launches, and autograph sessions.
