= Marquis of Pombal Square =

Roundabout in Lisbon, Portugal

Coordinates: 38°43′31″N 9°09′00″W

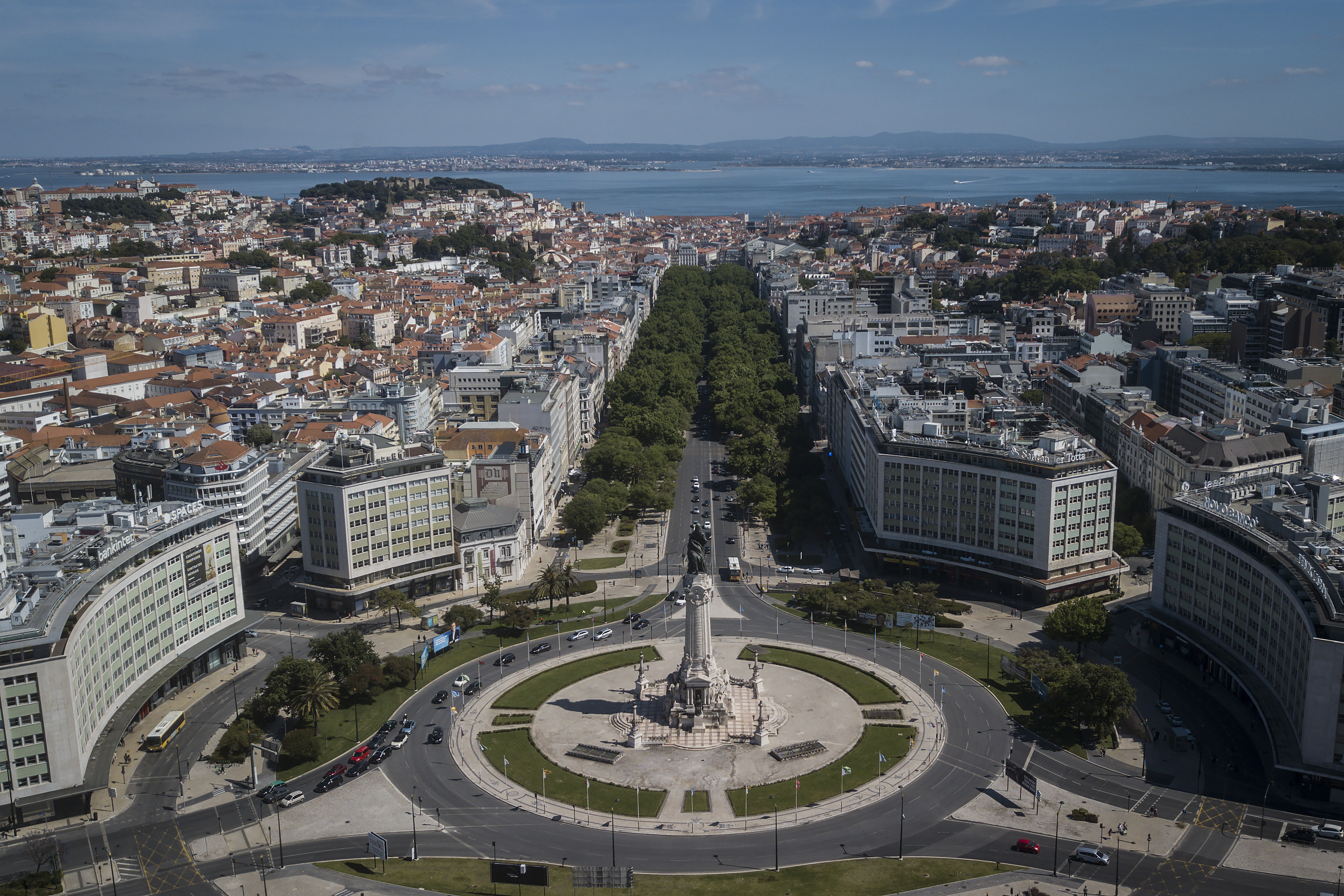
Marquis of Pombal Square from above

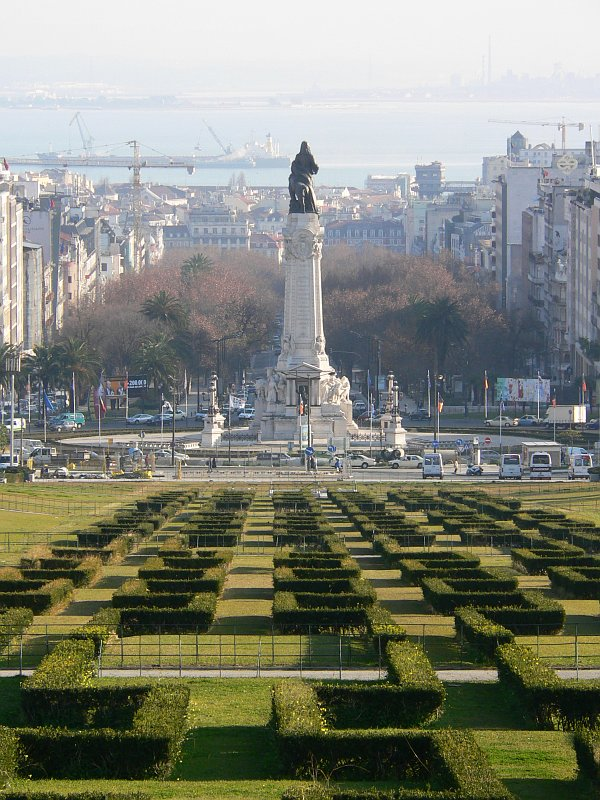
Marquis of Pombal Square seen from the Edward VII Park

Detail of the monument to Sebastião José de Carvalho e Melo, 1st Marquis of Pombal

The Marquis of Pombal Square (Portuguese: Praça do Marquês de Pombal) is an important roundabout in the city of Lisbon, Portugal. It is located between the Avenida da Liberdade (Liberty Avenue) and the Edward VII Park in the former parish of Coração de Jesus and in the quarter of Santo António.

The square is the radiating point for various important avenues: Liberdade, Duque de Loulé and Fontes Pereira de Melo, as well as the streets Braamcamp and Joaquim António de Aguiar.

The Blue and Yellow lines (Linha Azul and Linha Amarela) of the Lisbon Metro (Metropolitano de Lisboa) stop at Marquês de Pombal station, which was called Rotunda until March 1998. Eighteen bus lines operated by Carris also serve the square.

Its name is a reference to Sebastião José de Carvalho e Melo, 1st Marquis of Pombal, 1st Count of Oeiras, the powerful prime-minister who ruled Portugal from 1750 to 1777.

== Monument to the Marquis of Pombal ==
In the middle of the roundabout there is a large column dedicated to him, built between 1917 and 1934 and created by Adães Bermudes, António Couto and Francisco Santos. A bronze statue of the Marquess is on the top (40 m), with a lion - symbol of power - by his side. The lower part of the base is surrounded by several allegorical figures, "namely the female figure symbolizing« re-built Lisbon »and three sculptural groups evoking the reforms carried out by the Marquess looking towards the Baixa Pombalina, the area of Lisbon that was rebuilt under his direction after the disastrous 1755 Lisbon earthquake.
