= Estufa Fria =

Greenhouse in Lisbon, Portugal

Coordinates: 38.7293°N 9.1555°W

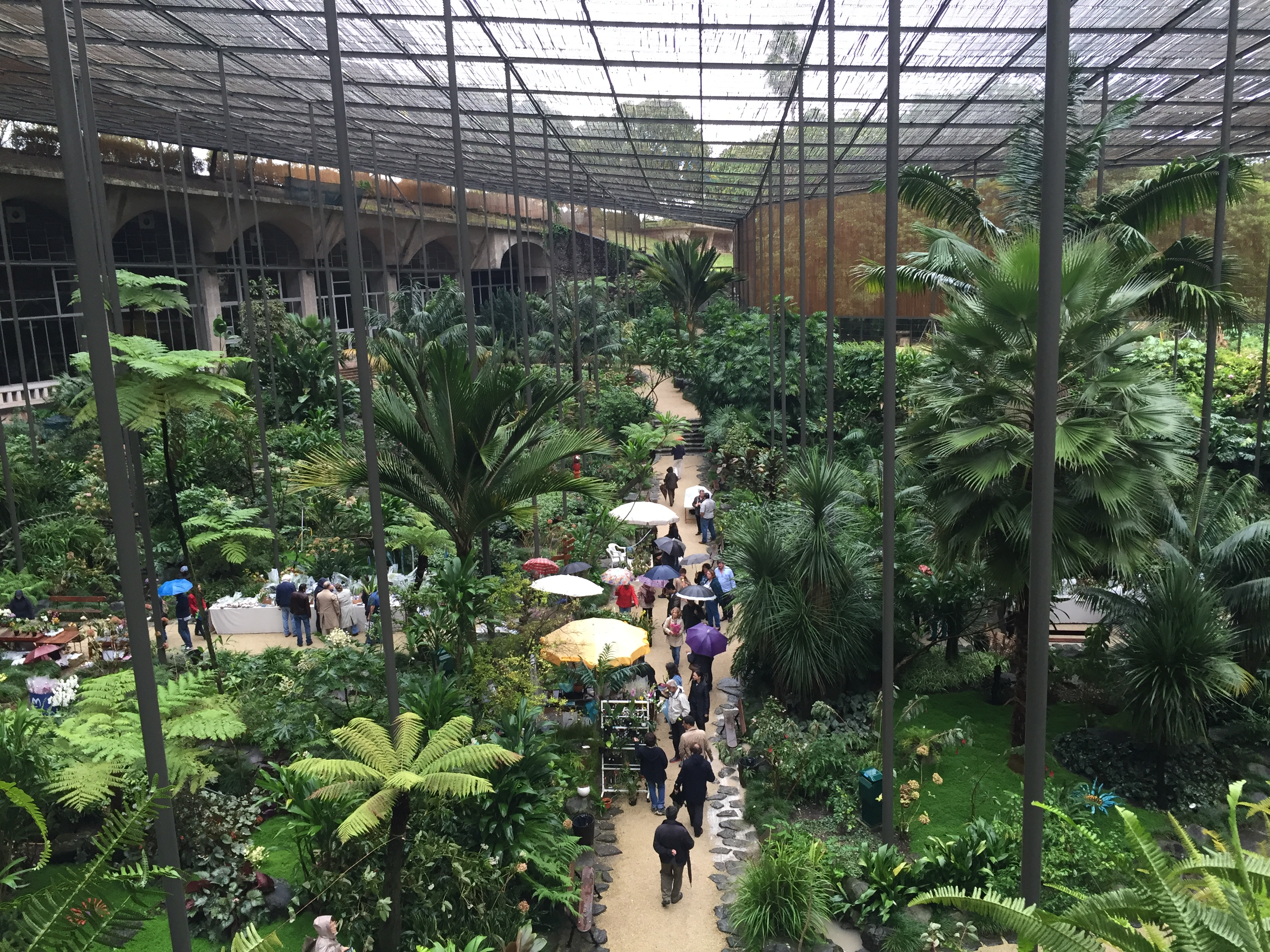
Estufa Fria, a greenhouse with three gardens in Lisbon

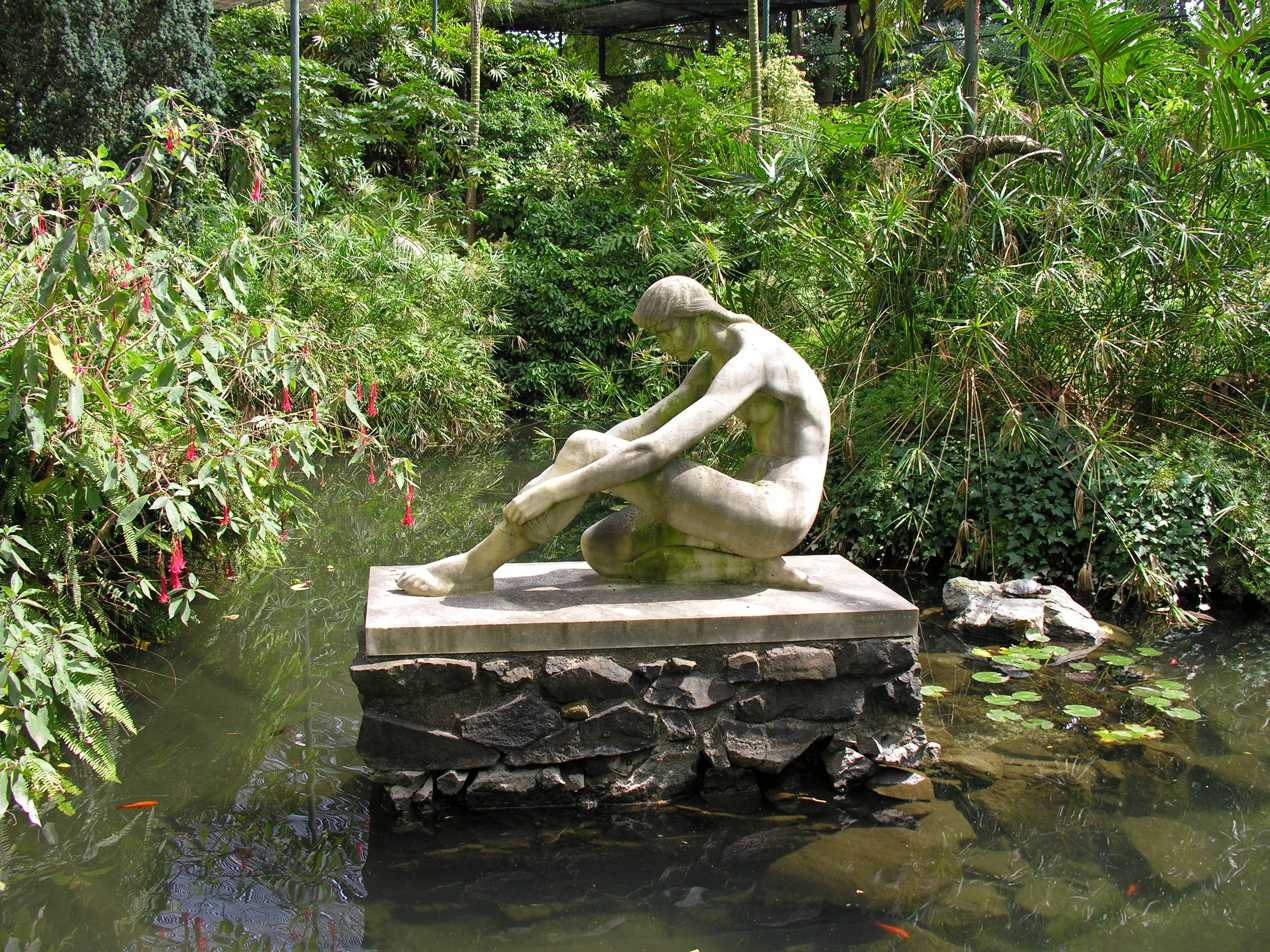
Statue in Estufa Fria

The Estufa Fria ([iʃˈtufɐ ˈfɾi.ɐ]; lit. "Cold Greenhouse") is a greenhouse with three distinct gardens located in Edward VII Park between the streets Alameda Engenheiro Edgar Cardoso and Alameda Cardeal Cerejeira in Lisbon, Portugal.

== History ==
The Estufa Fria opened in 1933. Portuguese architect Raul Carapinha conceived and designed the project. It was built near an old basalt mine which had been abandoned after a spring was discovered nearby. The greenhouse was remodeled concurrently with Edward VII Park in 1945 by Portuguese architect Francisco Keil do Amaral. The greenhouse's existing entrance porch, a lake near the entrance, and a large hall were built during this time.

== Expansion ==
In 1975 the Estufa Quente and Estufa Doce sections opened, expanding the botanical collection to include plants from tropical and equatorial regions. On 29 April 2009 the original Estufa Fria closed due to the risk of collapse of its steel structure. It reopened in April 2011 after two years of renovation work.

== Description ==
Measuring 1.5 hectares (3.7 acres) in area, the Estufa Fria consists of three parts:

- Cold Greenhouse (Estufa Fria)
- Hot Greenhouse (Estufa Quente)
- Sweet Greenhouse (Estufa Doce).

The term "cold greenhouse" comes from the original building's lack of mechanical heating; instead, wooden slats regulate sunlight and protect the plants from excessively hot or cold temperatures. The Cold Greenhouse is the largest of the three, measuring about 8,100 square metres (87,000 sq ft) in area. It is home to azalea and camellia species from around the world.

The Estufa Quente occupies about 3,000 square metres (32,000 sq ft) and is home to tropical species such as coffee and mangifera. The Estufa Doce contains cacti and other succulent plants, such as aloe.

The entire greenhouse complex features small lakes, waterfalls, and sculptures. Some of the sculptures are by noted twentieth-century Portuguese sculptors, including Domingos de Castro Gentil Soares Branco, Leopoldo de Almeida, and Pedro Anjos Teixeira.
