= Guilherme Rebelo de Andrade =

Portuguese architect

Guilherme Rebelo de Andrade (1891 - 1969) was a Portuguese architect.

== Sources ==
- Cruz, André. "O Estádio Nacional e os novos paradigmas do culto" (in European Portuguese) – via Academia.edu.
- "1939 – Prémio Valmor". Câmara Municipal de Lisboa. Archived from the original on April 3, 2008.
- "Cidadãos Nacionais Agraciados com Ordens Portuguesas". Presidência da República Portuguesa. Search result for "Guilherme Rebelo de Andrade".
