= Passeio Público (Lisbon) =

Park in Lisbon, Portugal

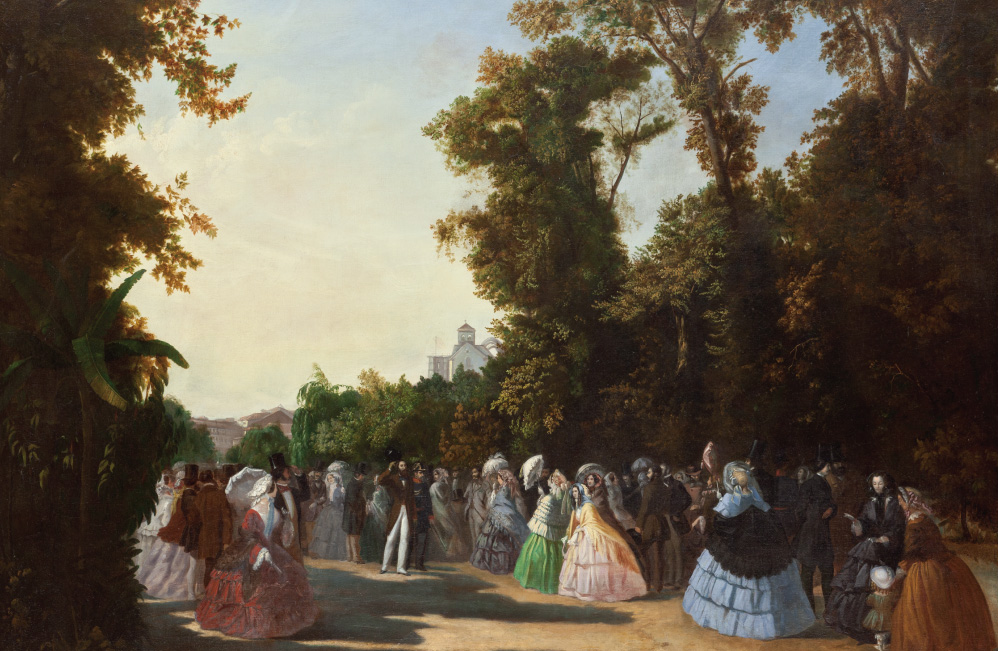
The Passeio Público at the height of its aristocratic popularity - King Ferdinand II strolling through the Passeio Público; Leonel Marques Pereira, 1856.

The Public Promenade (Portuguese: Passeio Público) was a park in Lisbon, Portugal, that was located where the Avenida da Liberdade is currently laid. Built after the 1755 Lisbon earthquake, the Passeio become an important fixture in the Lisbon landscape in the 19th century and was a meeting point for the upper echelons of Portuguese society.

Its borders soon attracted the finest homes of Lisbon personalities, leading to the eventual destruction of the park in order to construct a grand boulevard that would become the Avenida da Liberdade.

== History ==
=== Pombaline era ===
After the 1755 Lisbon earthquake, which resulted in the almost-total destruction of the city, Sebastião José de Carvalho e Melo, 1st Marquis of Pombal, the prime minister of King José I, managed the reconstruction of the city in a new enlightened plan, in what would become Pombaline style.

The Marquis ordered the demarcation and construction of the Passeio, to be at the northern edge of his newly constructed city. Management of the park's design and construction was given to royal engineer Reinaldo Manuel dos Santos, and construction lasted between 1764 and 1771.

Although it was given the name of Passeio Público, the park was not open to the public. It was walled and gated for the exclusive use of members of the Portuguese nobility. However, for about the first 50 years of the park's history, most aristocracy avoided the park, as they deemed it as lacking in ornamentation and poorly landscaped.

=== Aristocratic favour ===
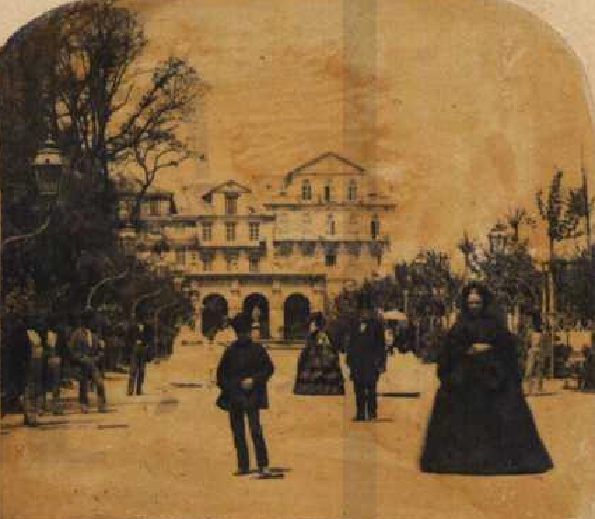
Passeio Público c. 1870s.

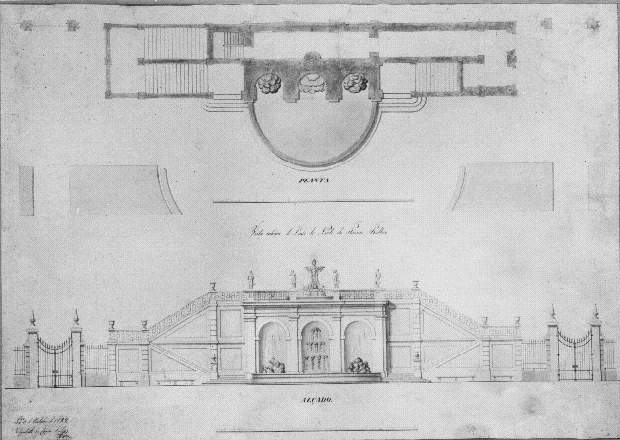
Plans for the new cascade, 1835

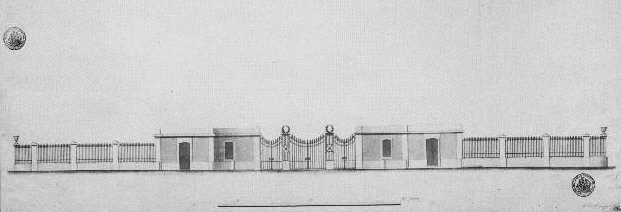
Plans for the new entrance, 1835

The Passeio's failure to attract the interests in the upper classes resulted in a successive series of works to improve the park's quality and popularity. The first of which was in 1821, when King João VI ordered that the walls surrounding the Passeio be torn down and that the park be open to people of all classes.

In 1835, the most noteworthy reformulation of the park was initiated by Malaquias Ferreira Leal, architect for the Municipality of Lisbon. Ferreira Leal's plans completely rearranged the fountains within the park, introduced the iconic allegorical statues of the Tagus and Douro rivers, and saw the construction of the Passeio's most iconic landmark, its cascade.

Following Ferreira Leal's rearrangement of the park, the Passeio quickly become a social meeting place for the aristocracy of Lisbon. For the next couple decades, the park would be the center for the follies of the rich and powerful of Lisbon. For the next few decades, the park grew in its statuary and amenities and, by 1851, the park became completely illuminated.

=== Avenida da Liberdade ===
By the latter half of the 19th century, Lisboners grew discontent with the outdated format of the Passeio and with the triviality of all the activities that took place there. In 1863, the first idea of creating a grand passageway through the park first arose, but it was only in 1873 when the Municipality of Lisbon took the decision to construct a great avenue through the Passeio.

Demolition work of the Passeio, including the park's trees and its famed cascade, began in 1879 and works lasted until 1886, when José Gregório da Rosa Araújo, Mayor of Lisbon, unveiled the new Avenida da Liberdade (Avenue of Liberty), the new central thoroughfare in Lisbon. Edward VII Park was later built north of the northern terminus of Avenida de Liberdade to make up for the public green space lost to the roadway.
