= Santo António, Lisbon =

Santo António
- Civil parish
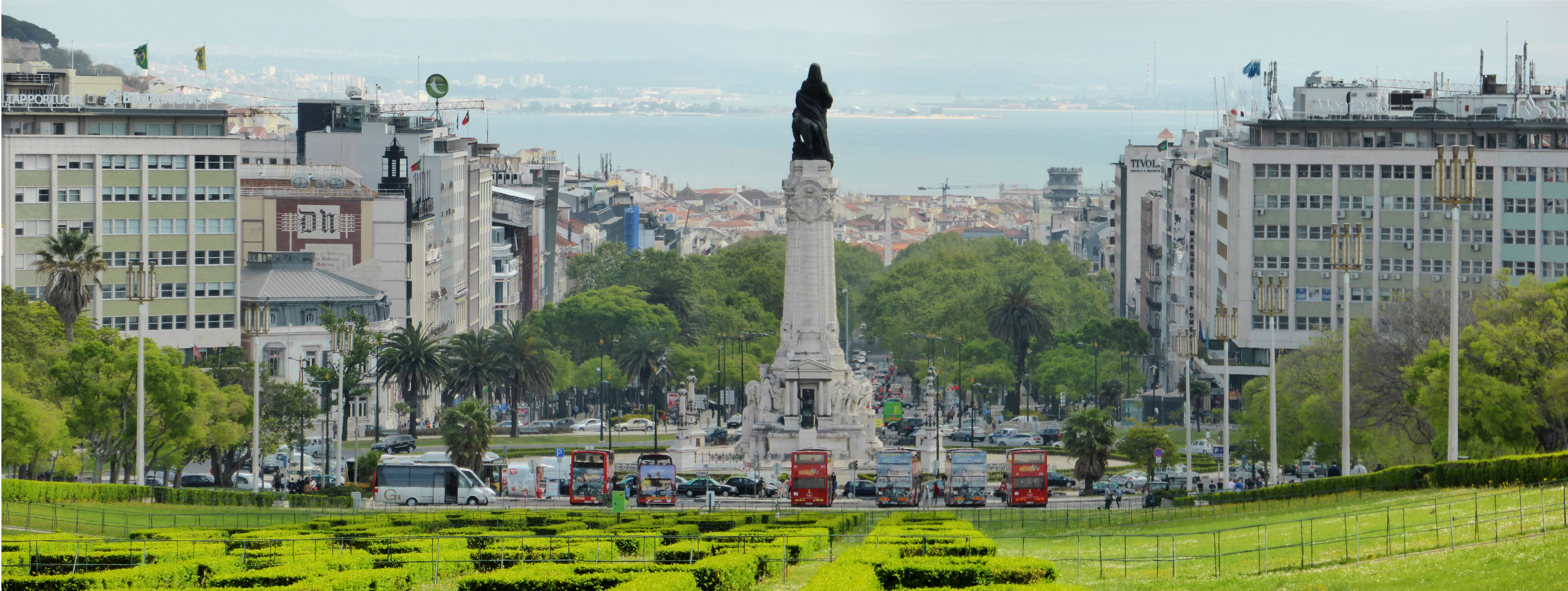
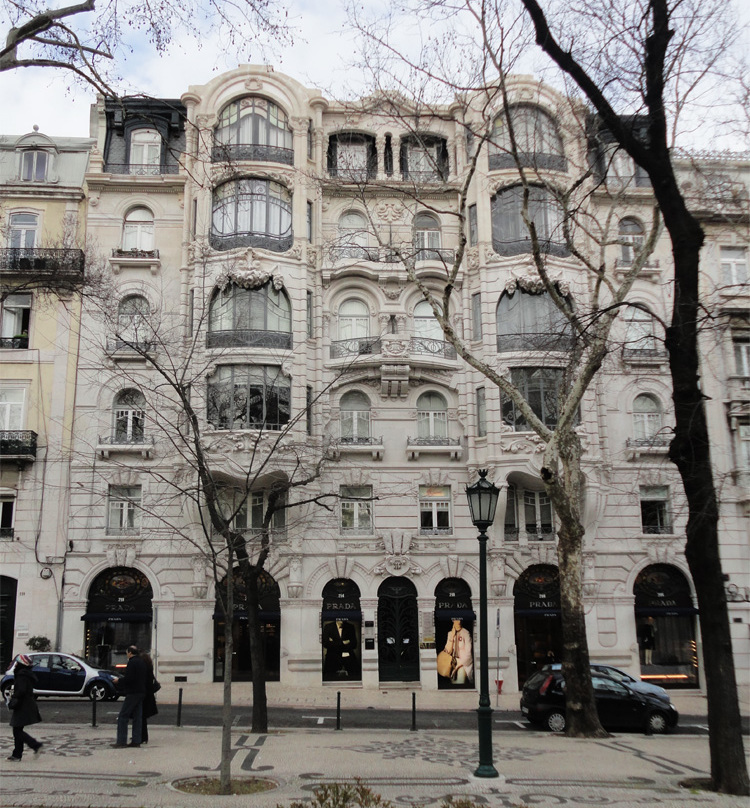
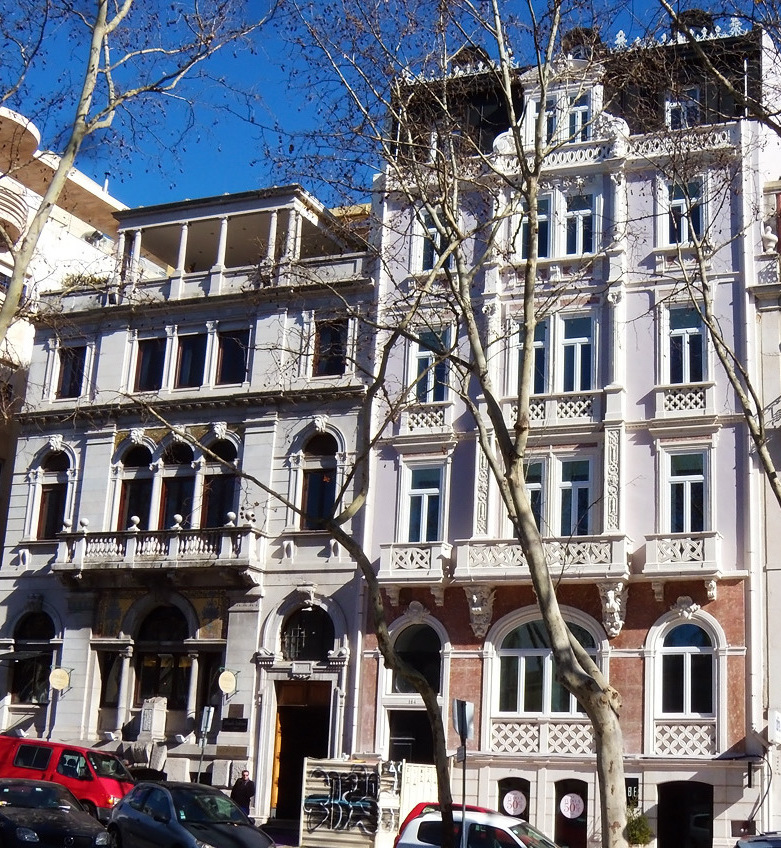
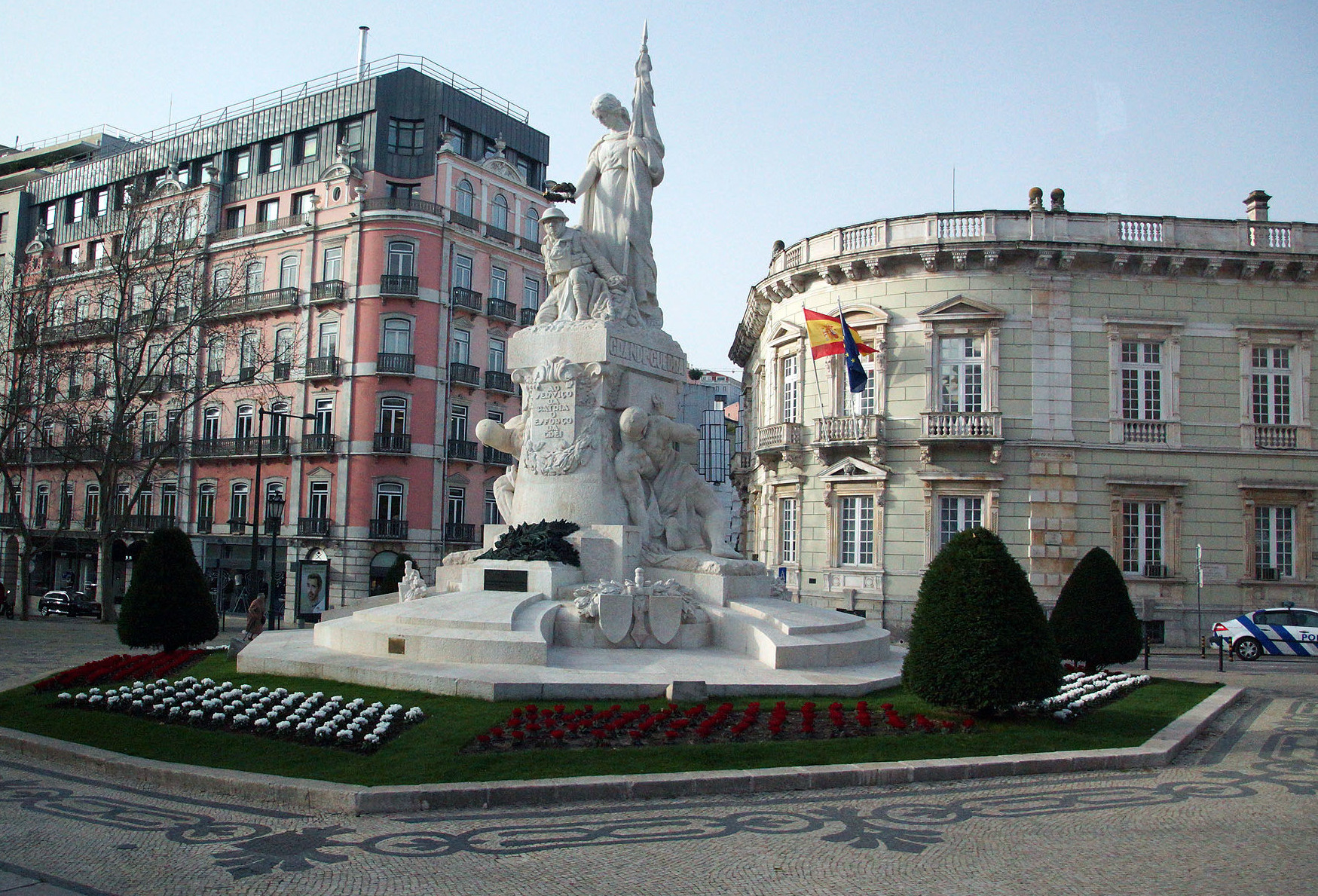
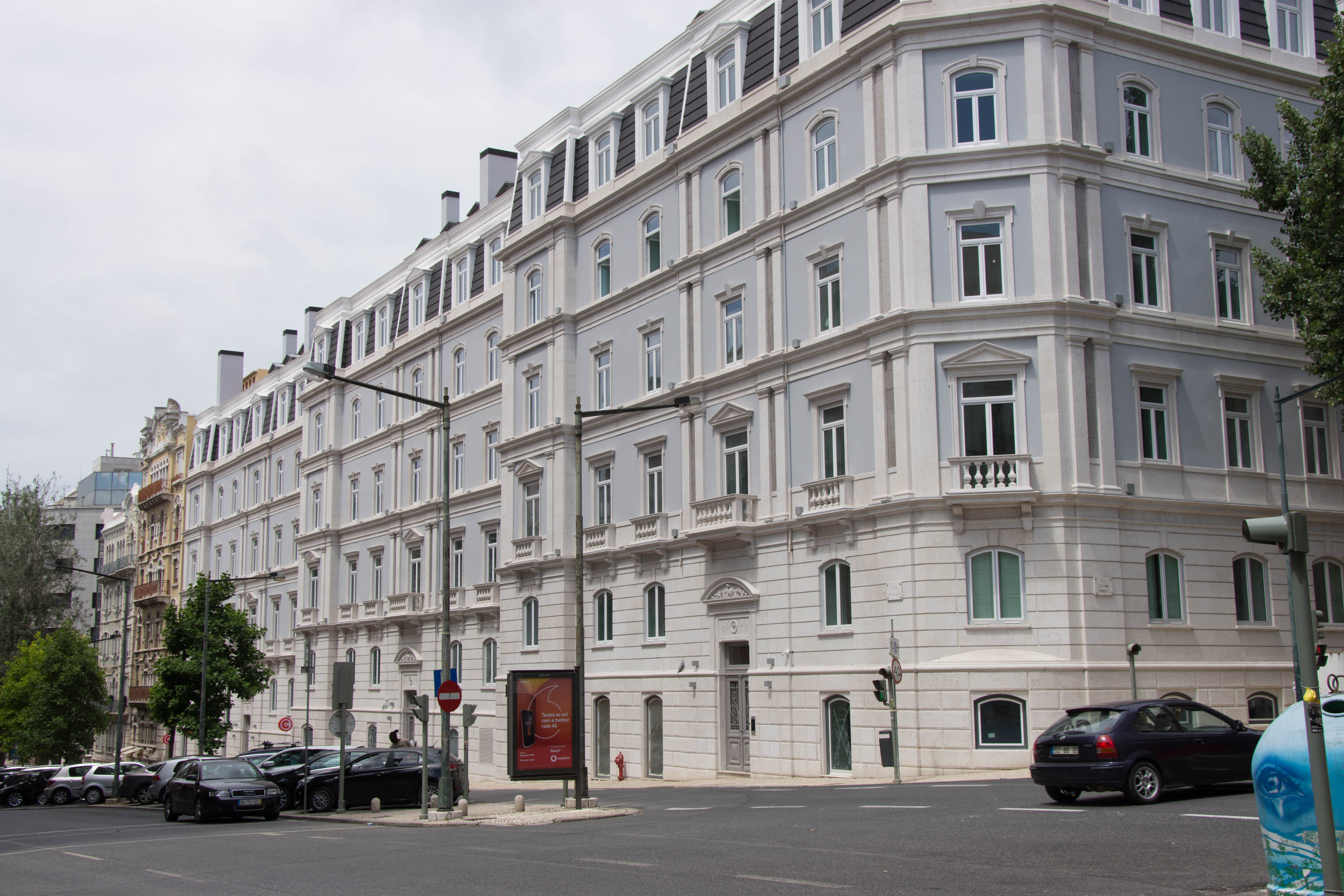
- Clockwise: View from Marquis of Pombal Square; Avenida da Liberdade; Duke of Loulé Avenue; Monument to the Great War; Prada Avenida da Liberdade.

- Coordinates: 38.739°N 9.151°W
- Country: Portugal
- Region: Lisbon
- Metropolitan area: Lisbon
- District: Lisbon
- Municipality: Lisbon

Area
  - Total: 1.49 km^{2} (0.58 sq mi)

Population (2011)
  - Total: 11,836
  - Density: 7,940/km^{2} (20,600/sq mi)
- Time zone: UTC+00:00 (WET)
  - Summer (DST): UTC+01:00 (WEST)

Santo António (European Portuguese pronunciation: [ˈsɐ̃t(u) ɐ̃ˈtɔni.u, - ɐ̃ˈtɔnju]) is a freguesia (civil parish) of Lisbon, the capital of Portugal. Located in central Lisbon, Santo António is east of Campo de Ourique, north of Santa Maria Maior and Misericórdia, west of Arroios, and south of Avenidas Novas. It is known for its luxury shopping, Michelin star restaurants, and as home to many of Lisbon's most recognizable landmarks and neighborhoods, such as Marquis of Pombal Square, Avenida da Liberdade, and Restauradores Square. The population in 2011 was 11,836.

== History ==
This freguesia was created with the 2012 Administrative Reform of Lisbon, merging the former parishes of São Mamede, São José and Coração de Jesus.

== Landmarks ==
- Avenida da Liberdade
- Marquis of Pombal Square
- Lisbon Botanical Garden
- Restauradores Square
- Monument to the Restorers
- Palacete Mayer
- Palace of the Counts of Redondo
