= Avenida da Liberdade =

Boulevard in Lisbon, Portugal

Coordinates: 38°43′13″N 9°08′45″W

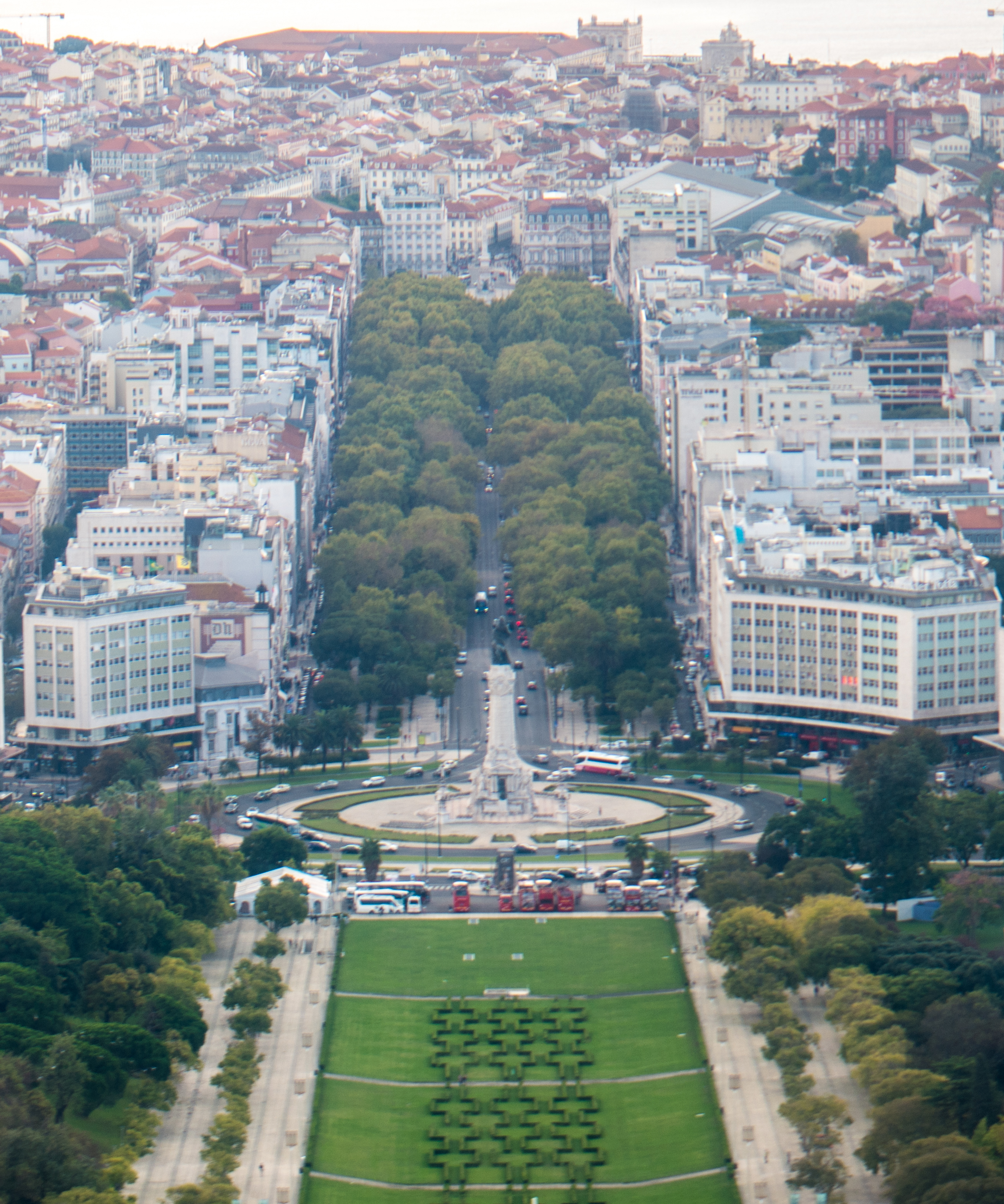
- View of Avenida da Liberdade from Marquis of Pombal Square to the Tagus River.
- Interactive map of Avenida da Liberdade
- Length: 1,100 m (3,600 ft)
- Width: 90 m (300 ft)

Construction
- Completed: 1886
- Demolition/Conversion of the Passeio Público: 1879

Avenida da Liberdade (Portuguese pronunciation: [ɐveˈniðɐ ðɐ liβɐɾˈðaðɯ]; meaning 'Avenue of Liberty') is a boulevard in central Lisbon, Portugal. It was built between 1879 and 1886 and designed by engineer Frederico Ressano Garcia. Measuring 90 metres wide, the avenue was modeled after Paris's Champs-Élysées and is known for its luxury retail stores and architecture.

The avenue was built on the former site of the Passeio Público, an 18th-century park initially designed for exclusive use by the Portuguese nobility. Despite its name ('Public Promenade'), the park was walled and gated until 1821, when King João VI ordered the walls be removed and access opened to all social classes. Once on the northern periphery of Lisbon, the park was converted into a boulevard as the city expanded north during the 19th century. Avenida da Liberdade is also home to several embassies and diplomatic missions to Portugal, including those of Australia, Canada, Cyprus, and Slovakia.

The Avenida connects Marquis of Pombal Square to Restauradores Square, marking the entrance to the Lisbon Baixa neighbourhood.

== History ==
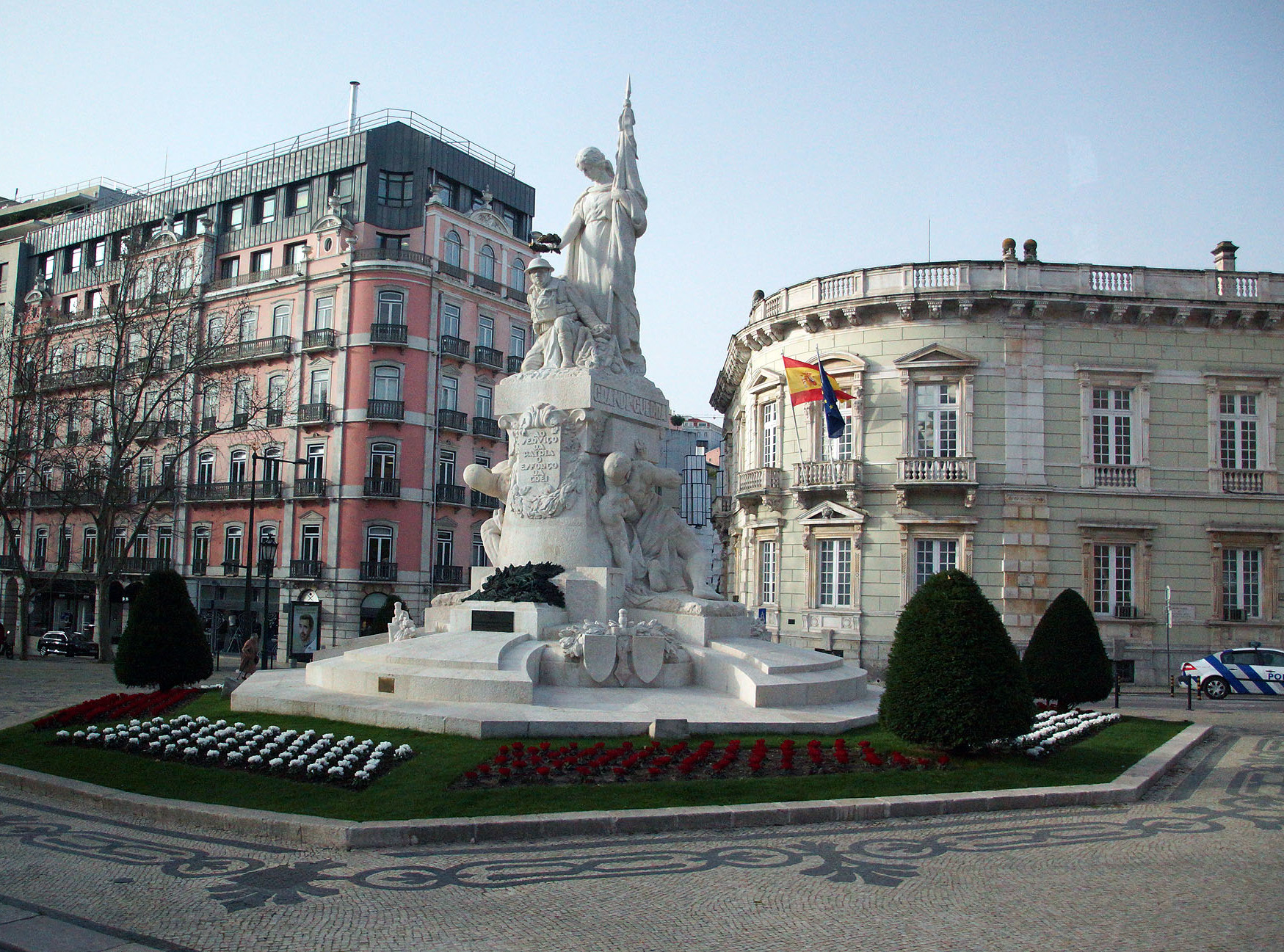
The Monument to World War I, in front of the Spanish embassy (right) and an apartment building (left).

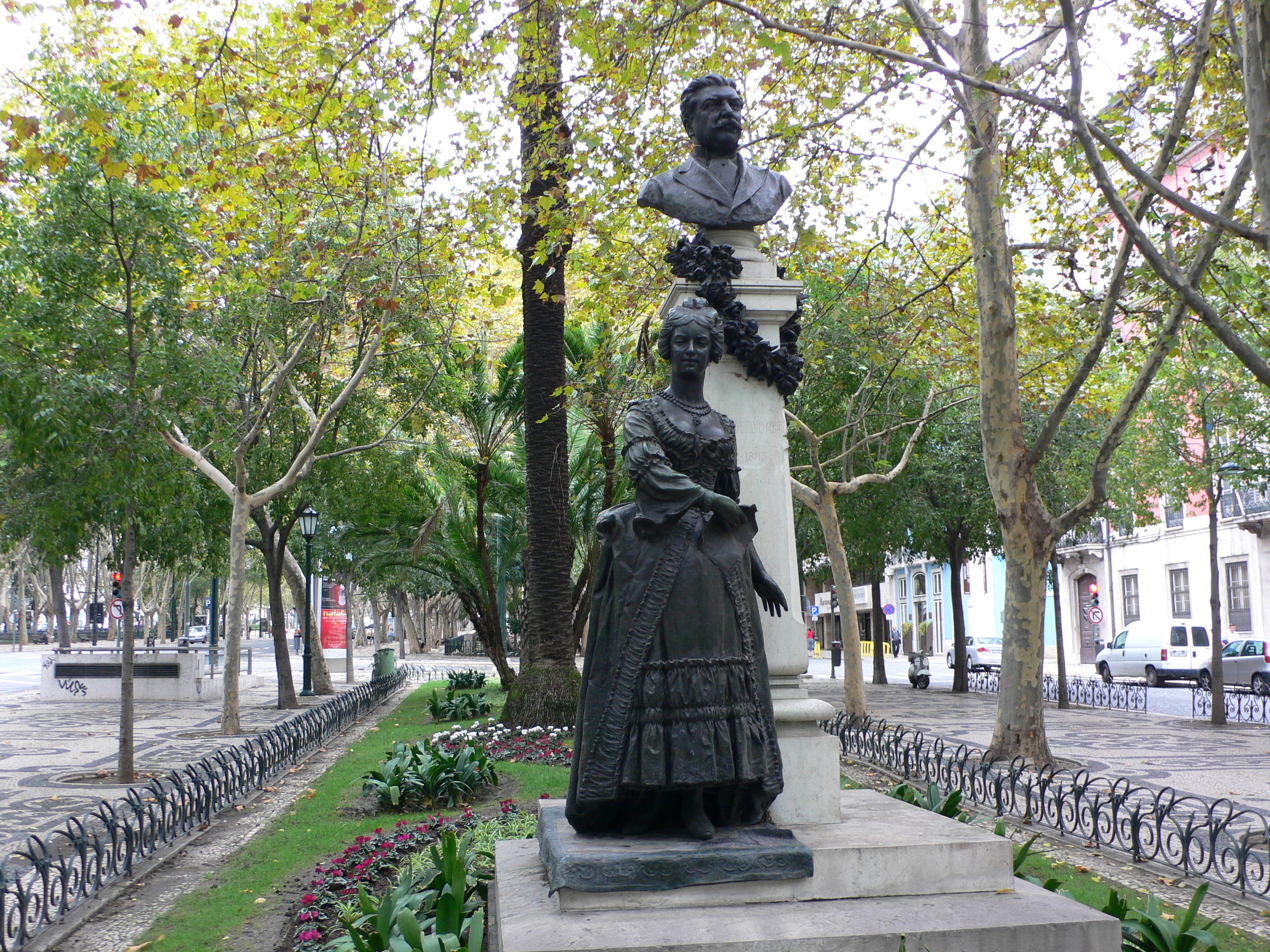
The Avenida is lined with monuments to writers and musical composers, from Portugal and abroad.

Avenida da Liberdade and the Restauradores Square have their origins in the Passeio Público, a public park inaugurated in 1764. The park was a project led by Pombaline architect Reinaldo Manuel. The area was initially surrounded by a high wall and restricted to nobility, but in 1835, architect Malaquias Ferreira Leal completely rearranged the gardens and added fountains, cascading waterfalls, and allegorical statues representing the Tagus and Douro rivers. Since the renovations, the statues, representing the Tagus and Douro rivers, have stood in the boulevard of the Avenida. Over time, monuments to writers Almeida Garrett and Alexandre Herculano were also added.

The Monument to the Fallen of the Great War, inaugurated on 22 November 1931, was designed by architects Guilherme Rebelo de Andrade and Carlos Rebello de Andrade, with sculptures by Maximiano Alves.

The avenue was built between 1879 and 1886 under the direction of Frederico Ressano Garcia, chief engineer of Lisbon City Council, and was designed to resemble contemporary Parisian boulevards such as the Champs-Élysées as part of the city's northward expansion plan Plans were made to extend further north, through what is the present central lawn lane of Eduardo VII Park, but these were ultimately not realized.

Since the mid-20th century, numerous original buildings along the avenue have been demolished and replaced by office buildings and hotels. Examples include the former Barata Salgueiro palace, inaugurated in 1902 and demolished in 1970, to make way for a bank headquarters building.

== Commercial profile ==
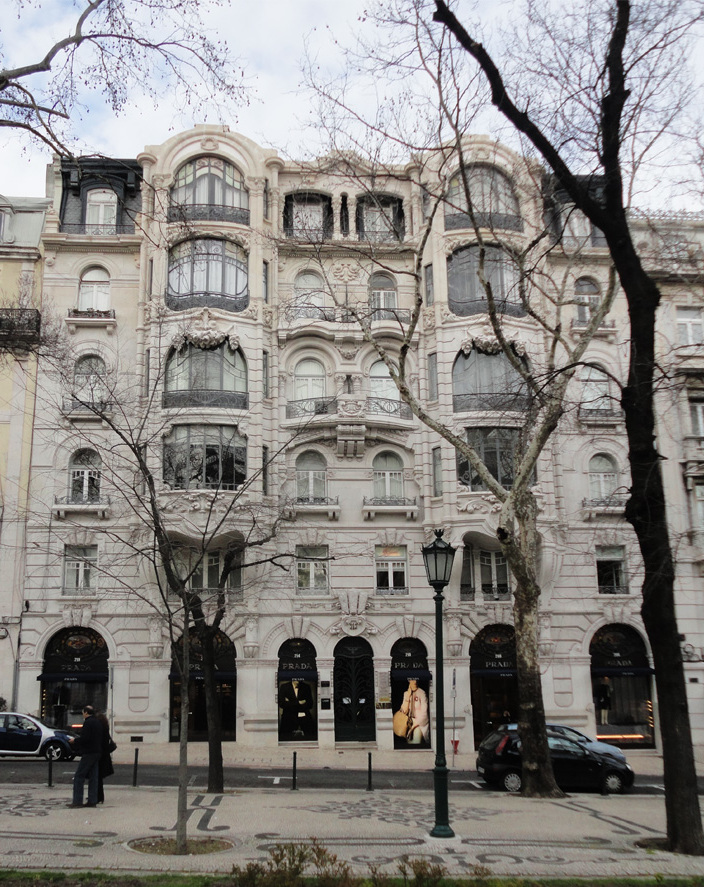
Prada's boutique on the Avenida.

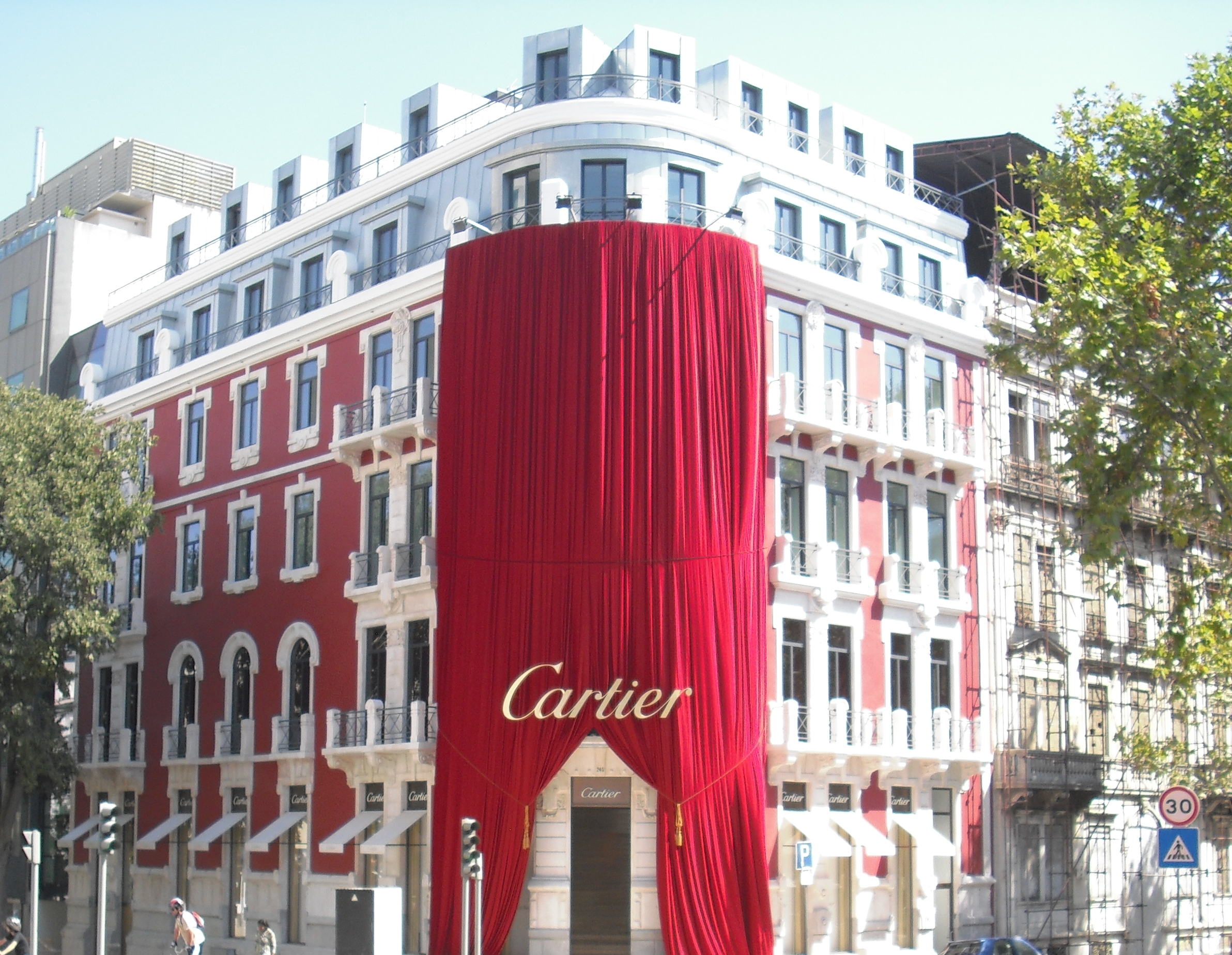
The Cartier flagship store on the Avenida.

Avenida da Liberdade's central location and proximity to places such as the Chiado district, Marquis of Pombal Square, Queen Maria II National Theatre, the Avenidas Novas, Eduardo VII Park, the Lisbon Baixa, and others, has contributed to its commercial development.

The avenue has become a major luxury shopping destination since Louis Vuitton opened the first international luxury brand store in 2004, followed by Prada and Gucci in 2008. The avenue now features retail stores from brands including Louis Vuitton, Prada, Gucci, Christian Dior, Cartier, and Burberry, as well as several luxury hotels.

== Transportation ==
The Avenida serves as a major transport route in central Lisbon, with connections to the Avenidas Novas, Lisbon Baixa, Chiado, Bairro Alto, and other neighbouring districts.

There are three Lisbon Metro stations along the Avenida:

- Restauradores at the southeast end, under Restauradores Square, served by the blue line.
- Avenida near the midpoint of the avenue, served by the blue line.
- Marquês de Pombal at the northwest end, under Marquis of Pombal Square, served by the blue and yellow lines.

Since 2022 automobiles have been prohibited on Avenida de Liberdade on Sundays and public holidays.

== Gallery ==
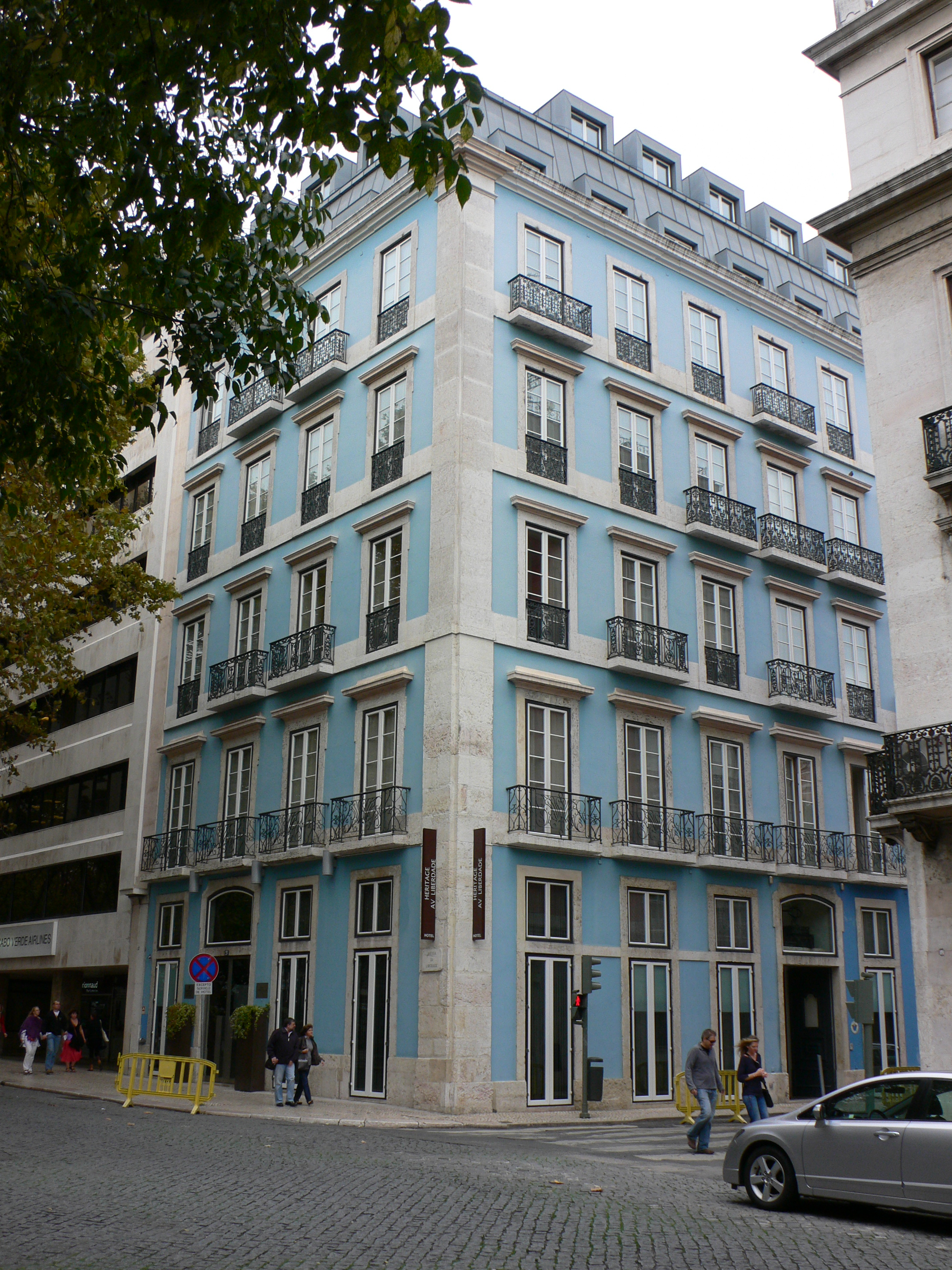
Hotel Heritage

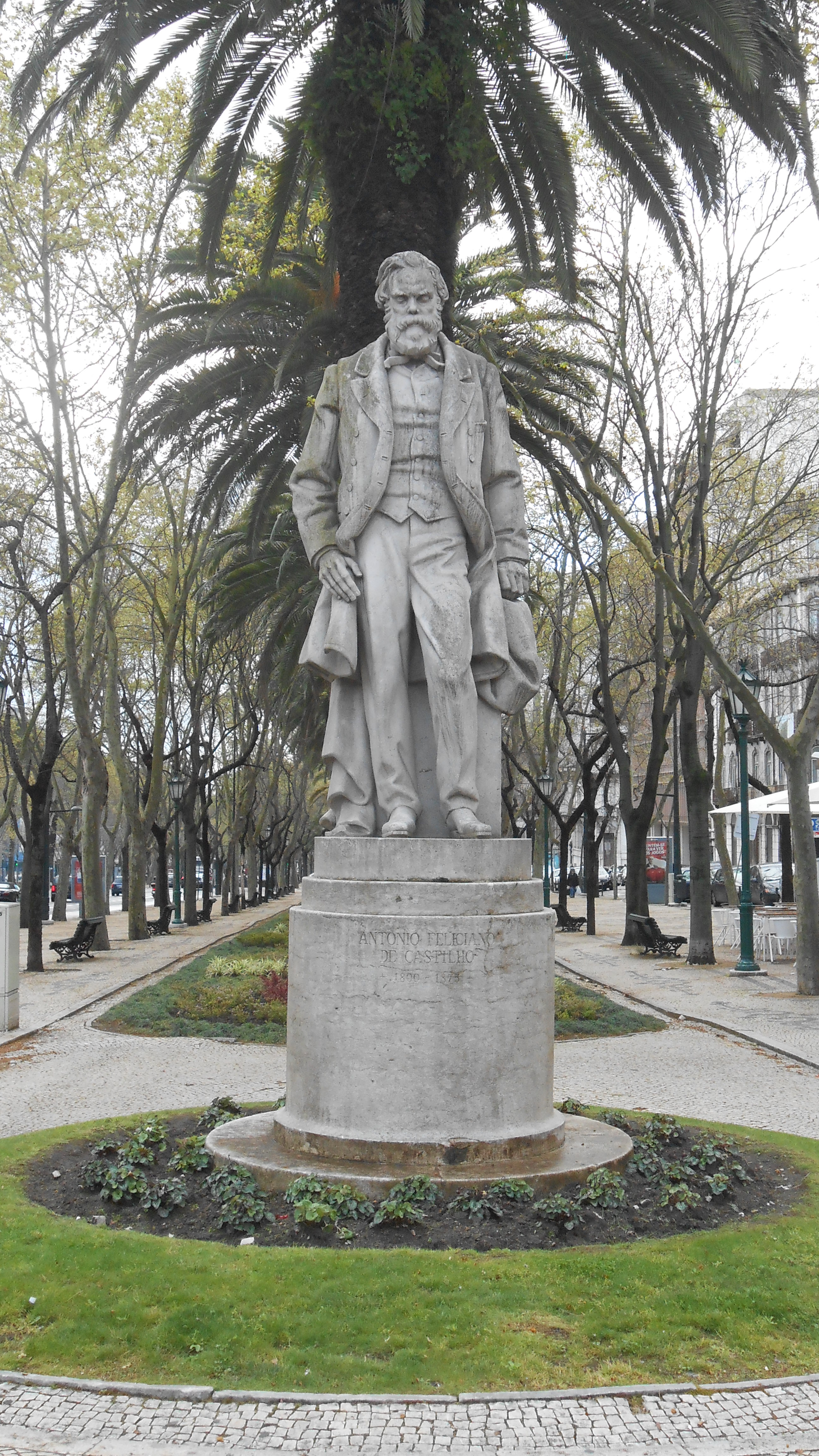
Monument to António Feliciano de Castilho

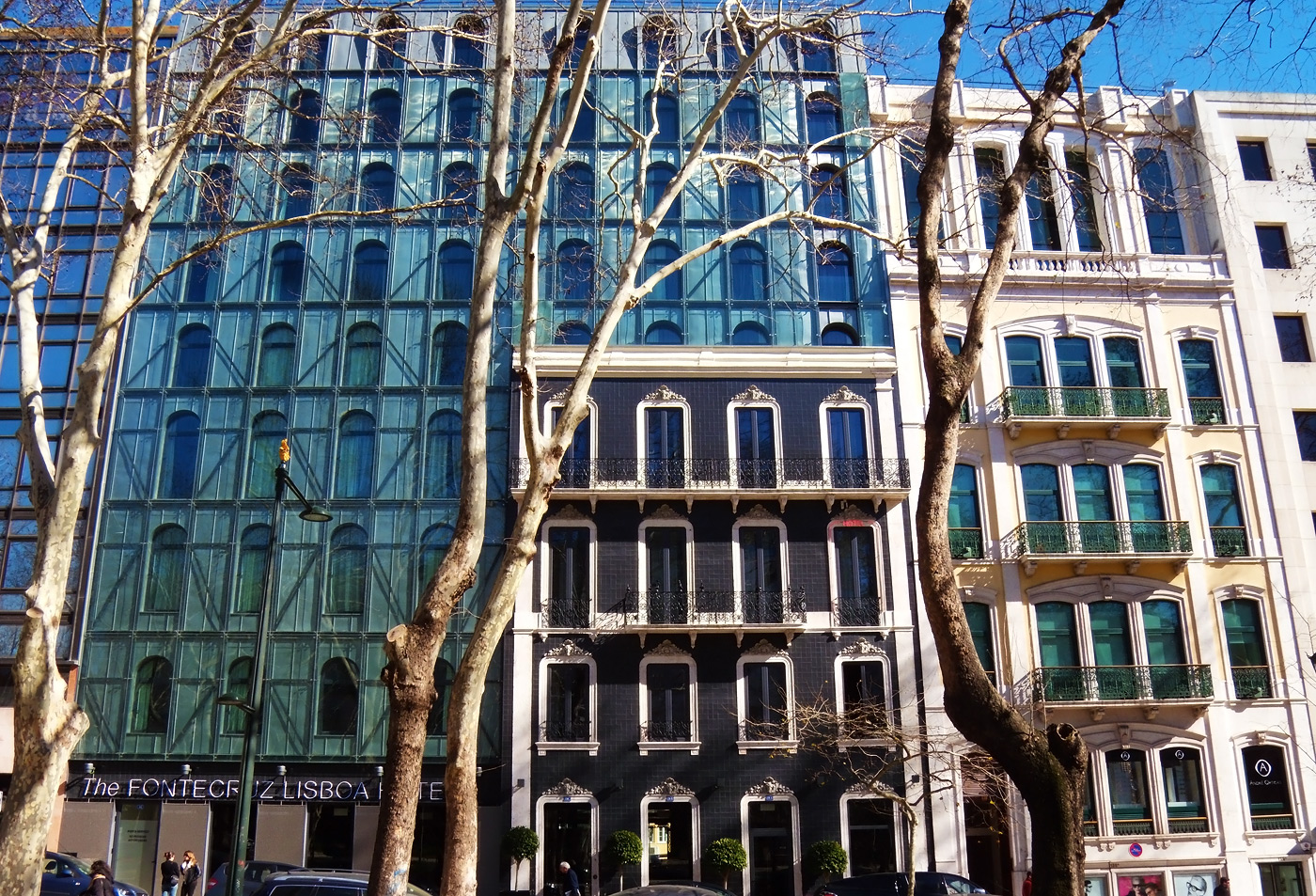
Luxury hotel

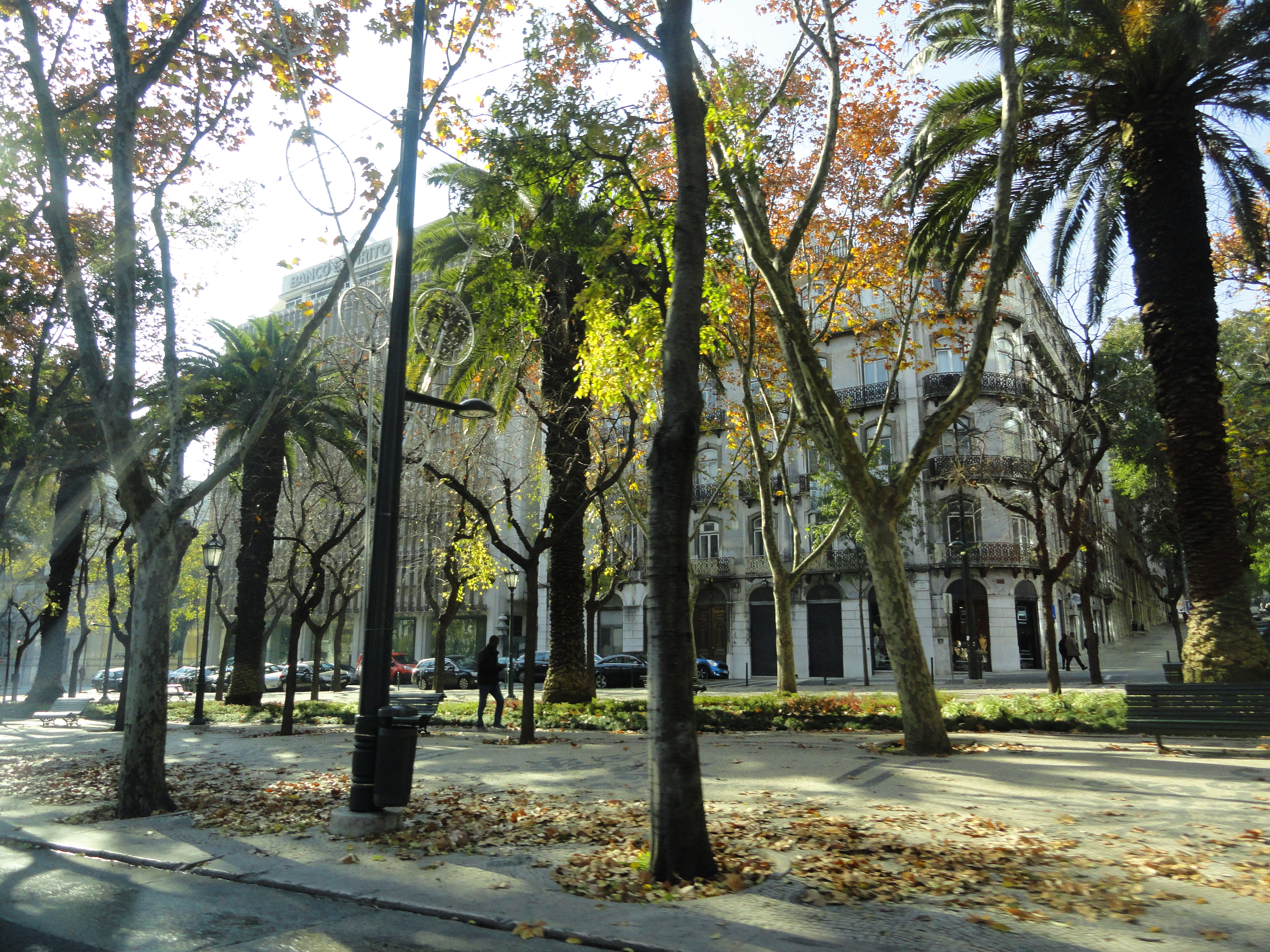

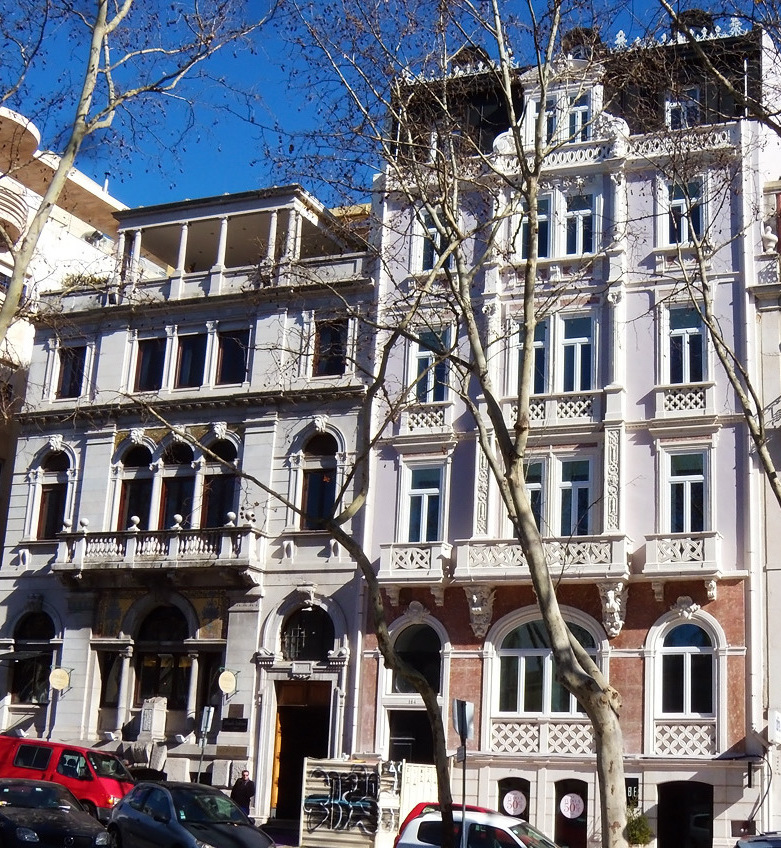

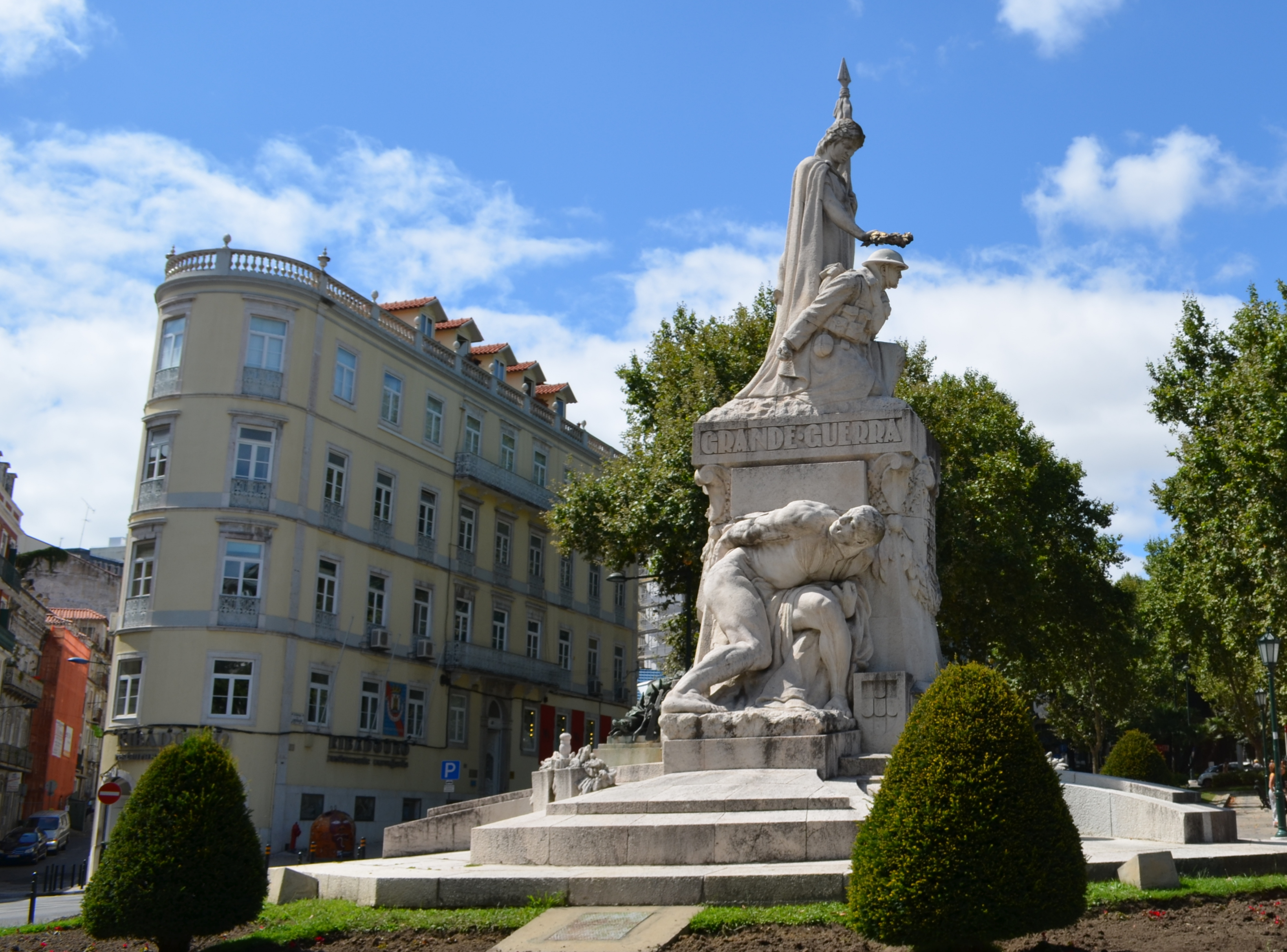
Monument to World War I

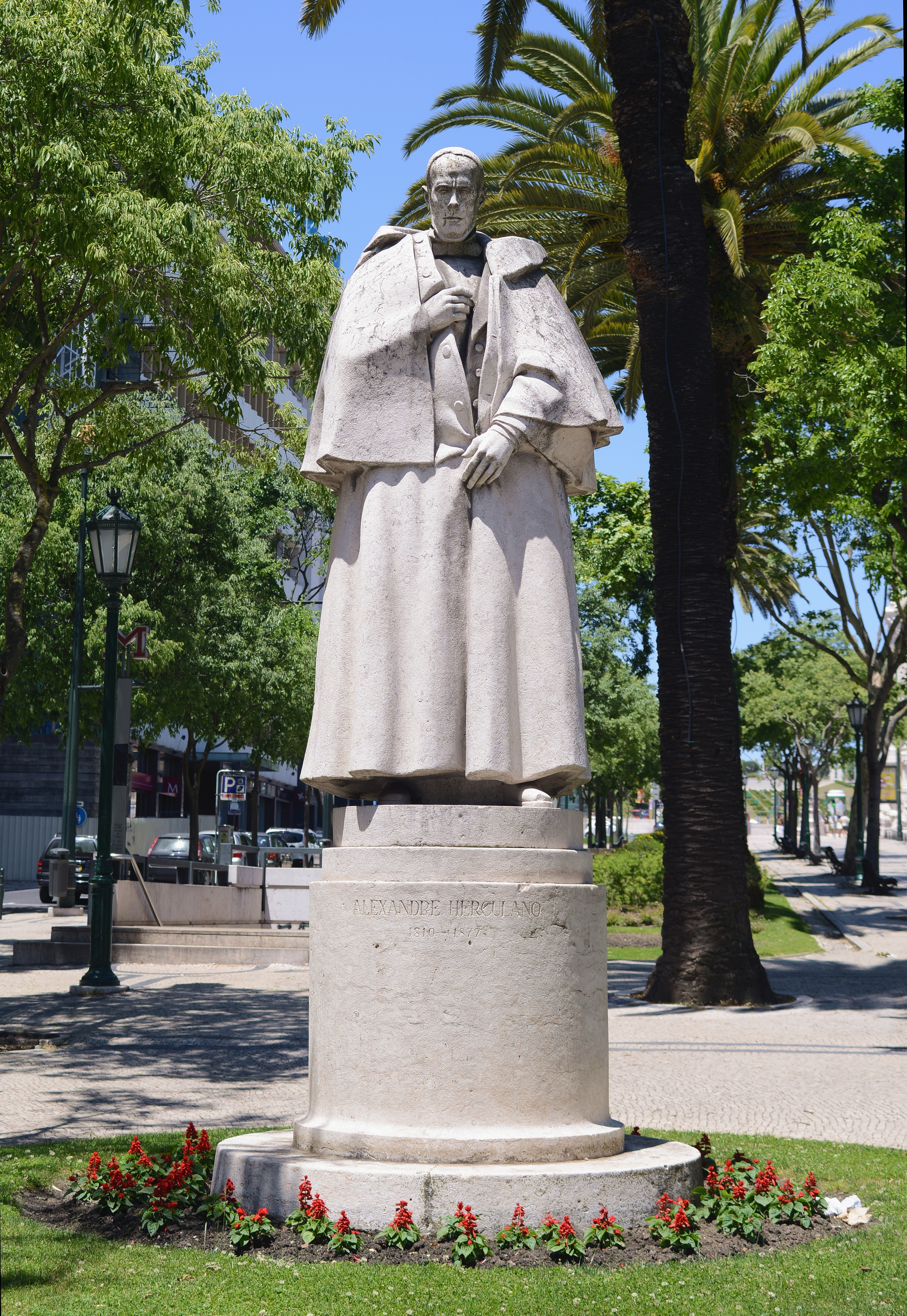
Monument to Alexandre Herculano
