= Celeste Caeiro =

Portuguese restaurant worker during the Carnation Revolution (1933–2024)

- Born: 2 May 1933; Lisbon, Portugal
- Died: 15 November 2024 (aged 91); Leiria, Portugal
- Other name: Celeste dos Cravos
- Known for: handing out flowers to soldiers during the Carnation Revolution
- Political party: PCP (from c. 1994)

Celeste Martins Caeiro (Portuguese pronunciation: [sɨˈlɛʃtɨ kɐˈɐjɾu]; 2 May 1933 – 15 November 2024), also known as Celeste dos Cravos ("Celeste of the carnations"), was a Portuguese communist and restaurant worker. Her actions led to the naming of the 1974 coup as the Carnation Revolution.

== Early life ==
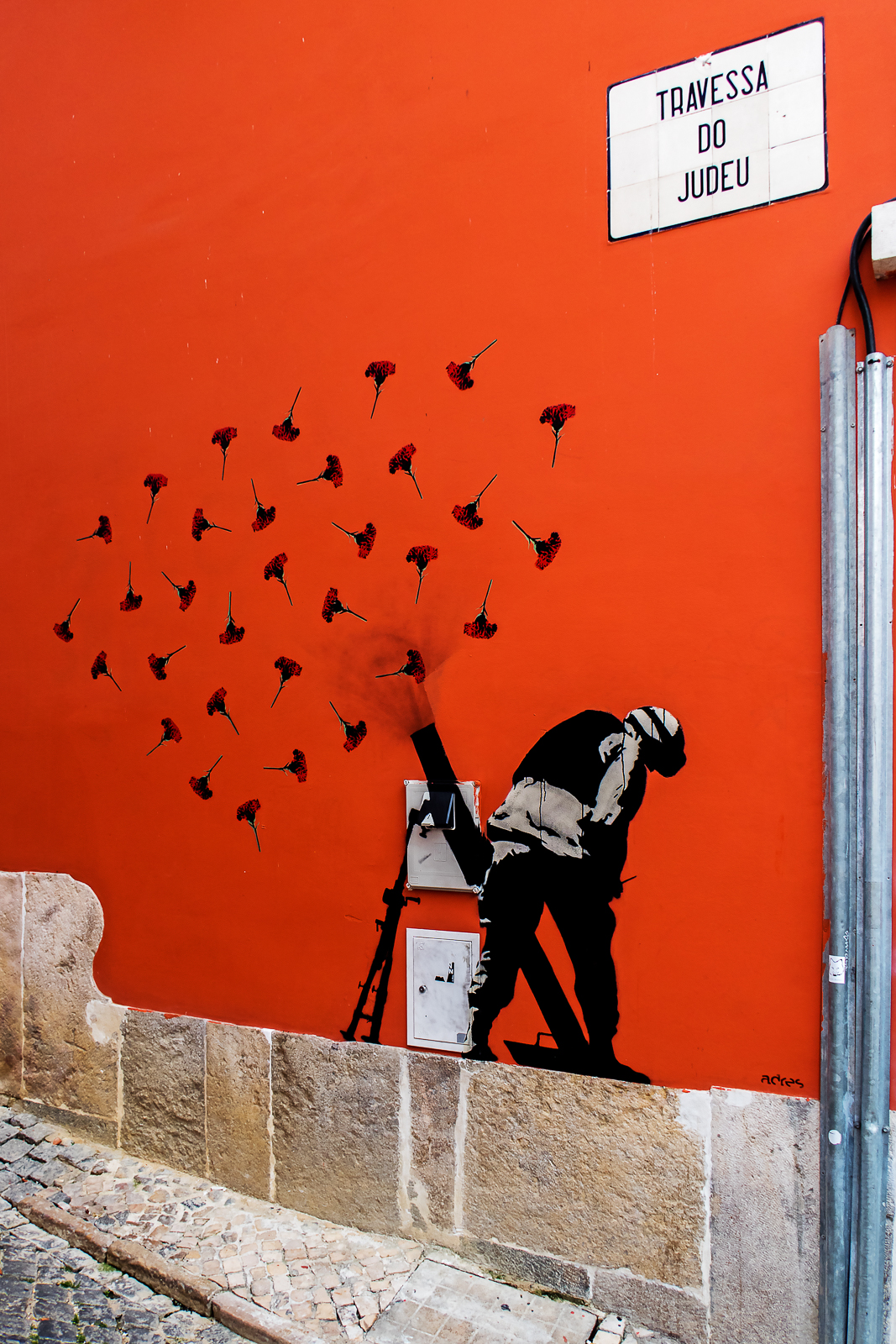
A mural in Lisbon attributed to Portuguese graffiti artist adres depicting carnations fired from a mortar, alluding to the 1974 Carnation Revolution

Caeiro was born on 2 May 1933 in Lisbon. Her mother, Teodora de Viana Martins Caeiro, was from Galicia, northern Spain, and went to live first in Amareleja and then in Lisbon, while Celeste's father left the family when she was a child.

When Caeiro was 18 months old, she was admitted to the Alto do Pina Day Centre and was regularly visited by her mother. At the age of 14 she was transferred to the Asilo 28 de Maio. At the age of 20, she started her pre-nursing studies at the Santa Clara de la Casa Pia College, but due to lung problems, she never practiced this profession.

As a teenager, during a holiday in the Alentejo, she found out that clandestine meetings were being held at her uncles' house. Although Caeiro never participated directly in the resistance against the regime of the Estado Novo, she did mobilise clandestinely in favour of the left.

In Lisbon, Caeiro worked at the tobacco shop of the Café Patinhas, which was a left-wing meeting place and where she hid books banned by the regime and participated in the smuggling of these books by hiding them in tobacco packets. She also became interested in politics when she attended the trial of an uncle who had been imprisoned for two years at the Plenary Court. Previously, she had worked in a shirt factory.

== 1974 Carnation Revolution ==
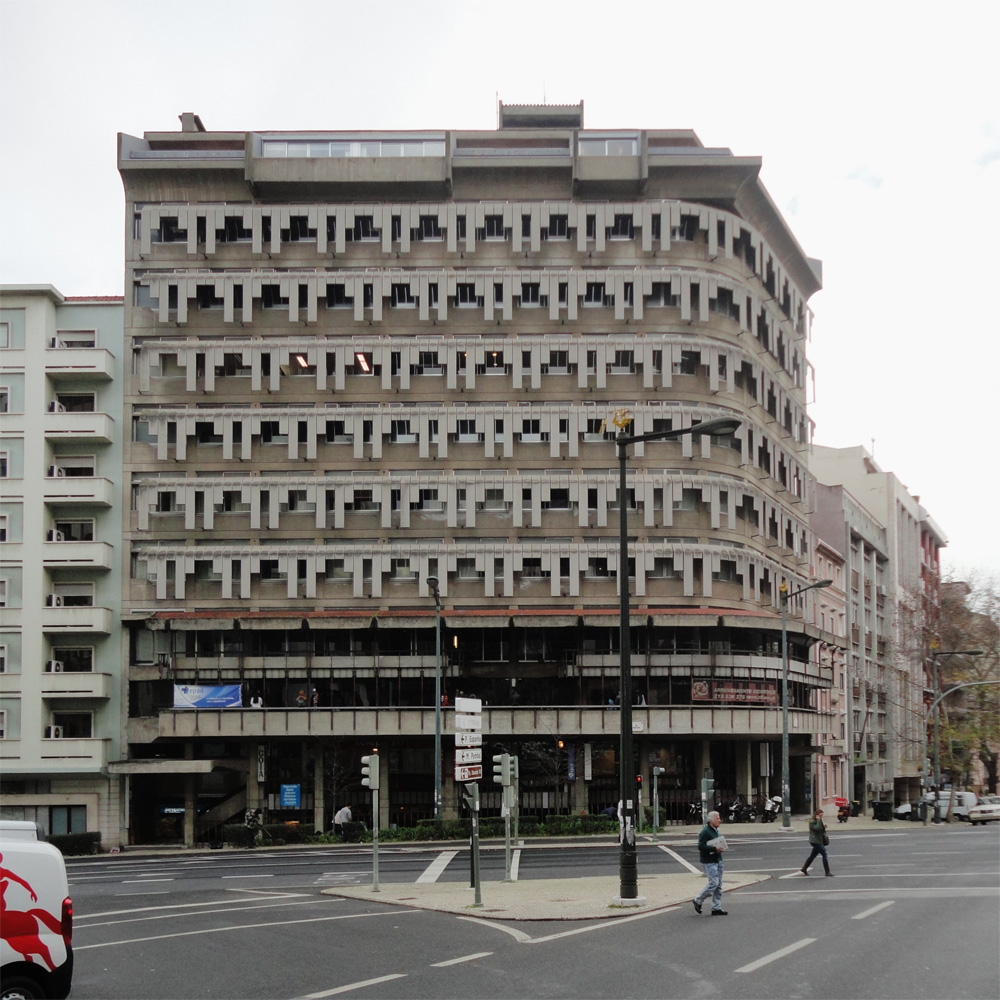
Franjinhas Building on Rua Braamcamp

In 1974 Caeiro was working in a self-service restaurant in Lisbon called "Sir" located at Franjinhas Building on Rua Braamcamp as a cleaner. The restaurant was opened on 25 April 1973 and for its first anniversary, on 25 April 1974, the owners planned to give out red and white carnations to all its customers and which were bought in Ribeira square by the owner of the restaurant. Caeiro had arrived at 9 a.m. without knowing that the military had already mobilised. The celebration had to be cancelled because of the coup, so the employees were asked to take the carnations home.

Back home, Caeiro took the Lisbon Metro to Rossio Station (Rossio square) where the tanks of the rebels awaited further orders. She approached two soldiers mounted on a Bravia Chaimite truck to ask what was going on, to which one replied that they were heading to Quartel do Carmo to arrest Prime Minister Marcelo Caetano and that a revolution had broken out. The same man asked her for a cigarette, but as Caeiro did not smoke and in compensation for the "good news" he had given her, as she said shortly afterwards, she gave him a carnation from the bouquet she was carrying and he put it in the barrel of his gun.

From then on, from Chiado to the Basilica of Our Lady of the Martyrs she gave the rest of the carnations to the soldiers involved, and they placed the flowers in the muzzle of their guns. The idea was copied and flower sellers donated more flowers to the mutinous soldiers. The pictures of the soldiers with carnations in their guns appeared on front pages all over the world and the coup became known globally as the Carnation Revolution and signalled the transition from a military coup to a peaceful and bloodless revolution.

The following day, when Caeiro returned to work, radio journalists asked her where the idea of the carnations had come from. She gave the first interview to magazine Crónica Feminina. Since then, every year, around 25 April, she was given time off work so that she could give interviews.

On 7 May 1974, journalist António José Saraiva wrote in the newspaper República that "the red carnation of Freedom has no known author, it was not proposed or programmed by any organisation. It is anonymous and natural like everything that is alive". Later, Artur Varatojo, in Crónica Feminina, described Celeste's gesture with a poem and as a symbol of freedom: "In a few days, the carnation became the symbolic flower of a country... The first hand that knew how to place it tenderly in the barrel of a rifle... It was a woman—if it is a woman—that someone has the right to an immortal statue." Celeste's testimony is also well detailed in Ana Sofia Fonseca's book Capitãs de Abril.

In 2024, she took part in the parade commemorating the 50th anniversary of the Carnation Revolution on Avenida da Liberdade in Lisbon alongside her daughter and granddaughter. Celeste Caeiro's presence on Avenida da Liberdade was one of the most memorable moments of the popular celebration. At the solemn session that day in the Assembly of the Republic, the deputy Rui Tavares suggested that a statue of Caeiro be erected in the Assembly building.

== Personal life and death ==
Caeiro, while working at the Café Patinhas tobacconist's, met a man, with whom she moved in shortly afterwards and with whom she had a daughter. They never married. When her daughter was three years old, Caeiro separated from him and left home after suffering from domestic violence.

On 25 August 1988, Caeiro lost all her belongings when the flat she had rented in the Armazéns do Chiado building was destroyed by a major fire in the area. She lived on a pension of 370 euros in a small house a few metres from Avenida da Liberdade. In 2024, a public subscription was organised to enable Caeiro to buy a hearing aid.

She was a member of the Portuguese Communist Party.

Caeiro died on 15 November 2024, at the age of 91 at Leiria Hospital due to respiratory problems. Her death was mourned by Prime Minister Luís Montenegro who stated that "in this hour of mourning, I leave a word of recognition for Celeste Caeiro", and the President Marcelo Rebelo de Sousa expressed his sadness and announced that she would be decorated posthumously, while the Armed Forces published a message saying that "Celeste Caeiro, with an apparently simple gesture, became the symbol of a movement that changed Portugal forever" and "her legacy will remain alive in history and in the memory of all of us". Political parties including the Portuguese Communist Party and LIVRE also mourned her death. The funeral took place 17 November in the church of São José da Anunciada in Lisbon, and she was later transferred to the crematorium in Alto de São João.

== Honors ==
- Medal of Honour of the City of Lisbon (2024)

== See also ==
- Flower Power (photograph)
