= Statue of António Ribeiro Chiado =

Monument in Lisbon, Portugal

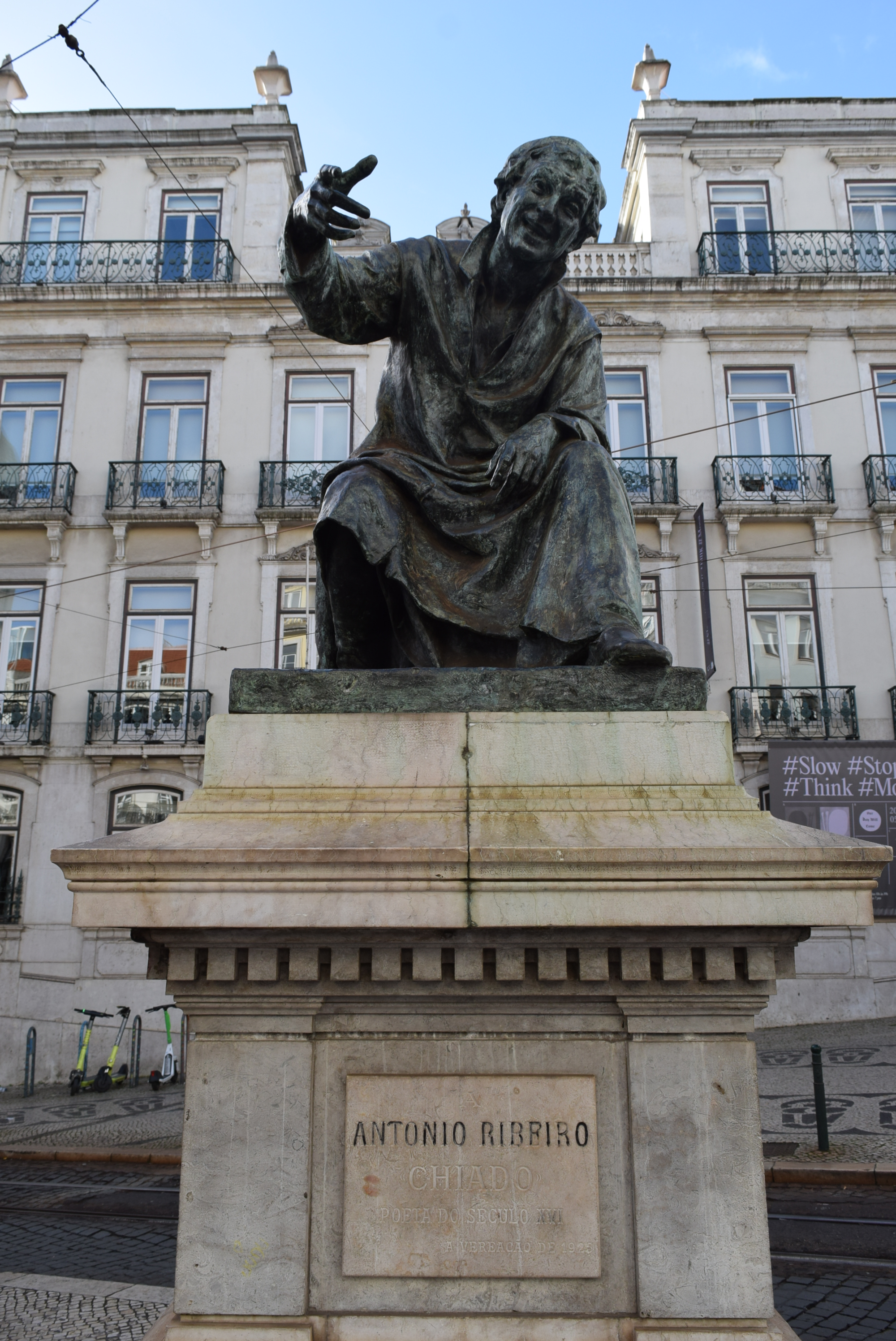
- The monument in 2023
- Interactive map of Statue of António Ribeiro Chiado
- Location: Chiado Square, Misericórdia, Lisbon, Portugal
- Coordinates: 38°42′37.91″N 09°08′32.05″W
- Designer: António Augusto da Costa Motta
- Type: Statue
- Material: Bronze, limestone
- Opening date: 18 December 1925
- Dedicated to: António Ribeiro Chiado

The statue of António Ribeiro Chiado (Portuguese: Estátua de António Ribeiro Chiado) is a monument in Lisbon, Portugal, placed at the Chiado Square, within the civil parish of Misericórdia. It consists of a bronze statue, depicting António Ribeiro Chiado, a local 16th-century poet, placed on a limestone pedestal. The monument was designed by António Augusto da Costa Motta and unveiled on 18 December 1925.

== History ==
The monument was commissioned by the municipal council of Chiado and designed by António Augusto da Costa Motta. It was unveiled on 18 December 1925 at the Chaido Square. It was dedicated to António Ribeiro Chiado, a local 16th-century poet and artist.

== Characteristics ==
The monument is placed at the centre of Chaido Square. It consists of a bronze statue of António Ribeiro Chiado, depicted sitting and talking, placed on a limestone pedestal.
