= Leitão & Irmão =

Portuguese luxury jewelry and specialty design house

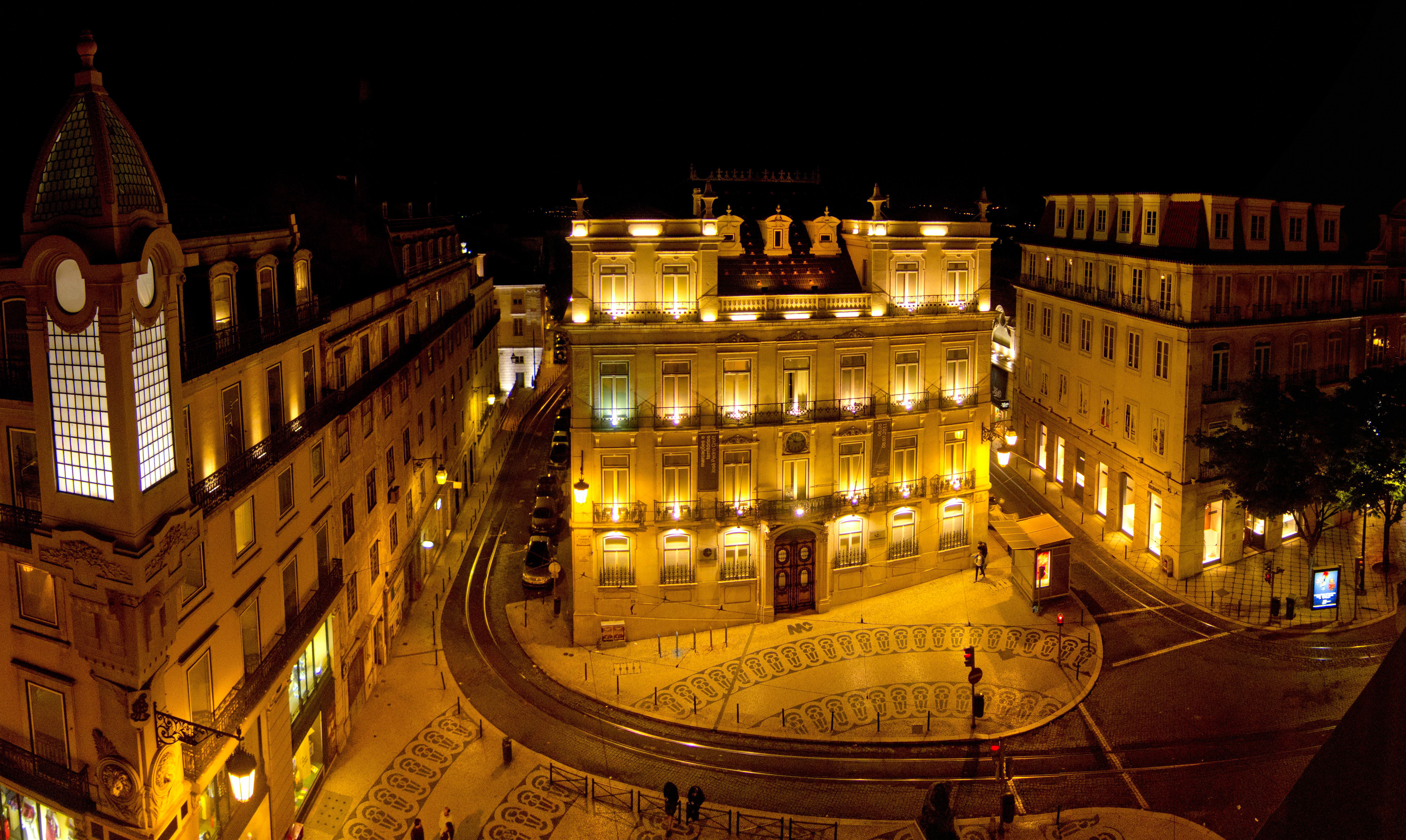
- Largo do Chiado 17, the building of Leitão & Irmão's main store
- Type: Family held company
- Industry: Retail
- Founded: 1822; 204 years ago in Porto, Portugal
- Founders: José Pinto Leitão
- Headquarters: Largo do Chiado 17; Lisbon, Portugal
- Area served: Worldwide
- Key people: Jorge Van Zeller Leitão (CEO)
- Products: Jewelry; porcelain; crystal; stationery; accessories
- Website: www.leitao-irmao.com

Leitão & Irmão (colloquially known as Leitão House) is a Portuguese luxury jewelry and specialty design house founded in 1822, headquartered in Chiado, Portugal. The jeweler of the Portuguese royal family since Luís I's nomination in 1887. Responsible for the image of Our Lady of Fátima, all Portuguese crown jewels since the 19th century and major works, it is known for luxury jewelry, particularly in gold and diamond.

Founded by José Pinto Leitão in 1822, the house started serving the Imperial House of Brazil in 1872, developing its name and esteem following the praise of Pedro I.

Serving three locations in continental Portugal, the house is currently owned and managed by the sixth generation of the Leitão family.

== History ==
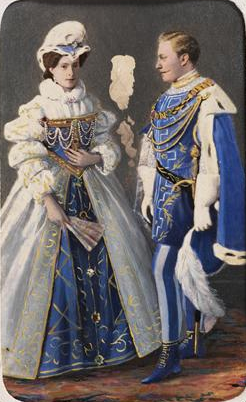
Luís I and Maria Pia of Savoy, who made the house the official crown jeweler, in 1865.

After its foundation in 1922, the title of Crown Jewelers made Casa Leitão move from Porto to Lisbon, to the court, where it established a modern goldsmith's workshop that is still in operation today. With stores in Lisbon and Cascais, the house stands out in the manufacture of custom-made and personalized pieces, namely engagement rings, jewelry, cutlery, tableware, as well as maintenance and restoration.

After opening the store in the cosmopolitan area of Chiado, in Lisbon in 1887, with José and his brother Narciso, they develop its activity in the capital of the kingdom benefiting from the proximity of the court. During this period, they undertook the artistic project of restoring the traditions of Portuguese goldsmithing, marking the renewal of goldsmithing in the second half of the nineteenth century, with their first crown pieces being the jewelry of the marriage between King Carlos and Amélie of Orléans, last Queen of Portugal.

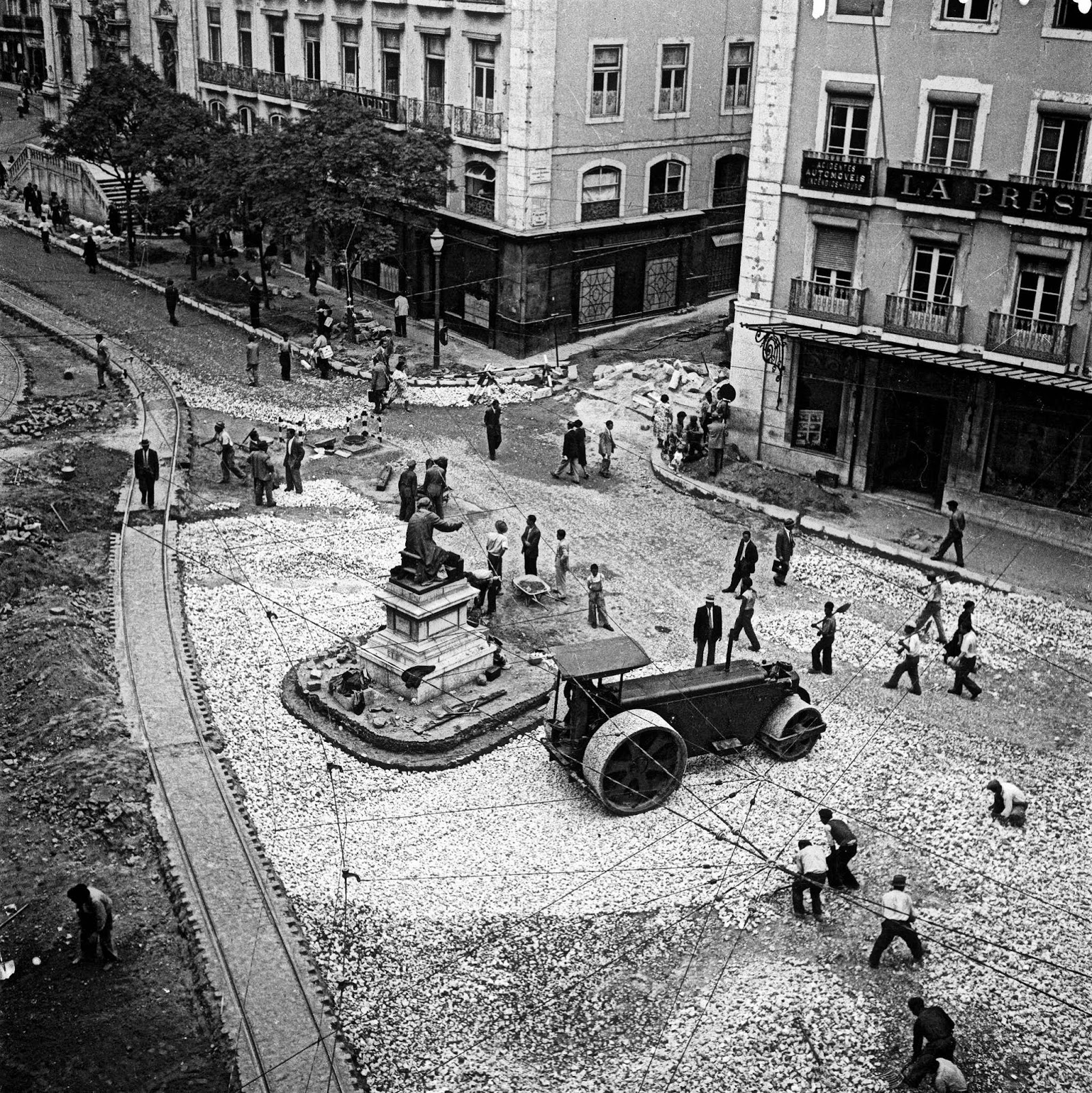
The original Lisbon Largo do Chiado 17 location of the house, where it still is today, under renovations in 1953.

The house currently has three locations, with its first remaining in Chiado, alongside another and with a store in Cascais. Since 1953, the development of the crown of Our Lady of Fatima was one of the most publicized Portuguese jewels since the original crown jewels. Said crown, in gold and precious stones, was the result of a national campaign of gifts entrusted to the Leitão house, was worked for three months by twelve craftsmen and has 313 pearls and 2679 precious stones set in gold.

Almost half a century later, in 1984, the work gained more prominence when Pope John Paul II offered Our Lady of Fátima the bullet that hit him in the attack of May 13, 1981 in the Vatican. The bullet found the perfect fit in the empty space, left in 1942 at the union of the eight rods that make up the Queen's crown.
