= António Ribeiro Chiado =

Portuguese poet

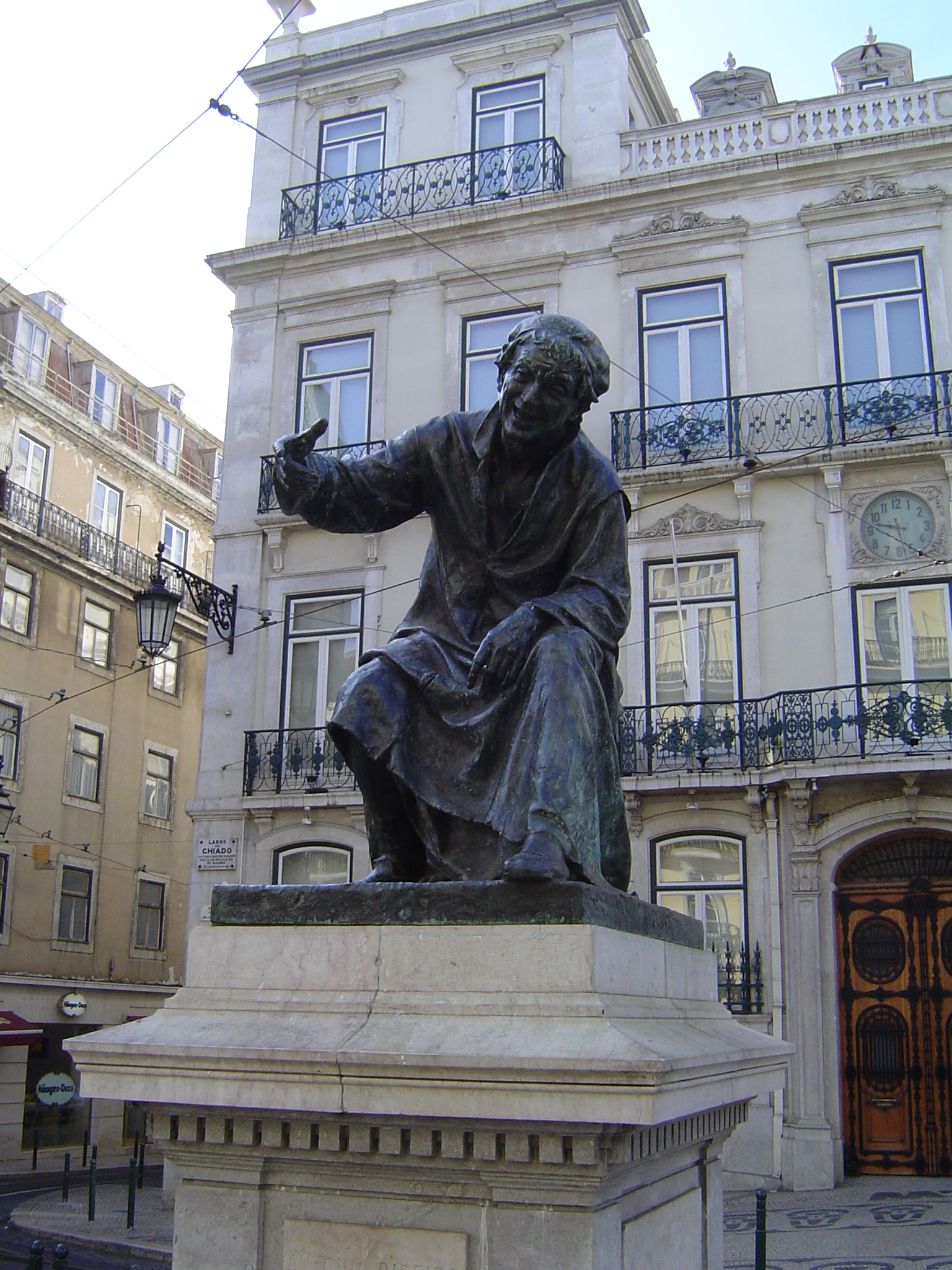
Statue of António Ribeiro, the "Chiado", in the Chiado Square.

António Ribeiro O.F. (Évora, 1520 – Lisbon, 1591), known as O Chiado or O Poeta Chiado was a Portuguese poet.

O Chiado was a satirical poet of the sixteenth century, contemporary of Luís Vaz de Camões. He was known as Chiado for having lived many years in Chiado, Lisbon, in the street so called already in the sixteenth century (today Rua Garrett).

== Biography ==
António Ribeiro was born around 1520 in Évora. Little is known of his family, though it is likely that he had a humble upbringing. He taught at Ordem dos Franciscanos in his hometown until he decided to leave behind his cloistered life. He decided to move from Évora to Lisbon, where his talent for words made him famous in the region of Chiado. It is said that he followed a life of celibacy and adorned himself in clerical clothing.

During his life, he enjoyed great popularity not just as a poet but also as a skilled improviser, as well as an impressionist of notable figures of his time.

Ribeiro died in Lisbon in 1591.
