= Chiado =

Coordinates: 38°42′38″N 9°08′32″W

- Neighborhood of Lisbon
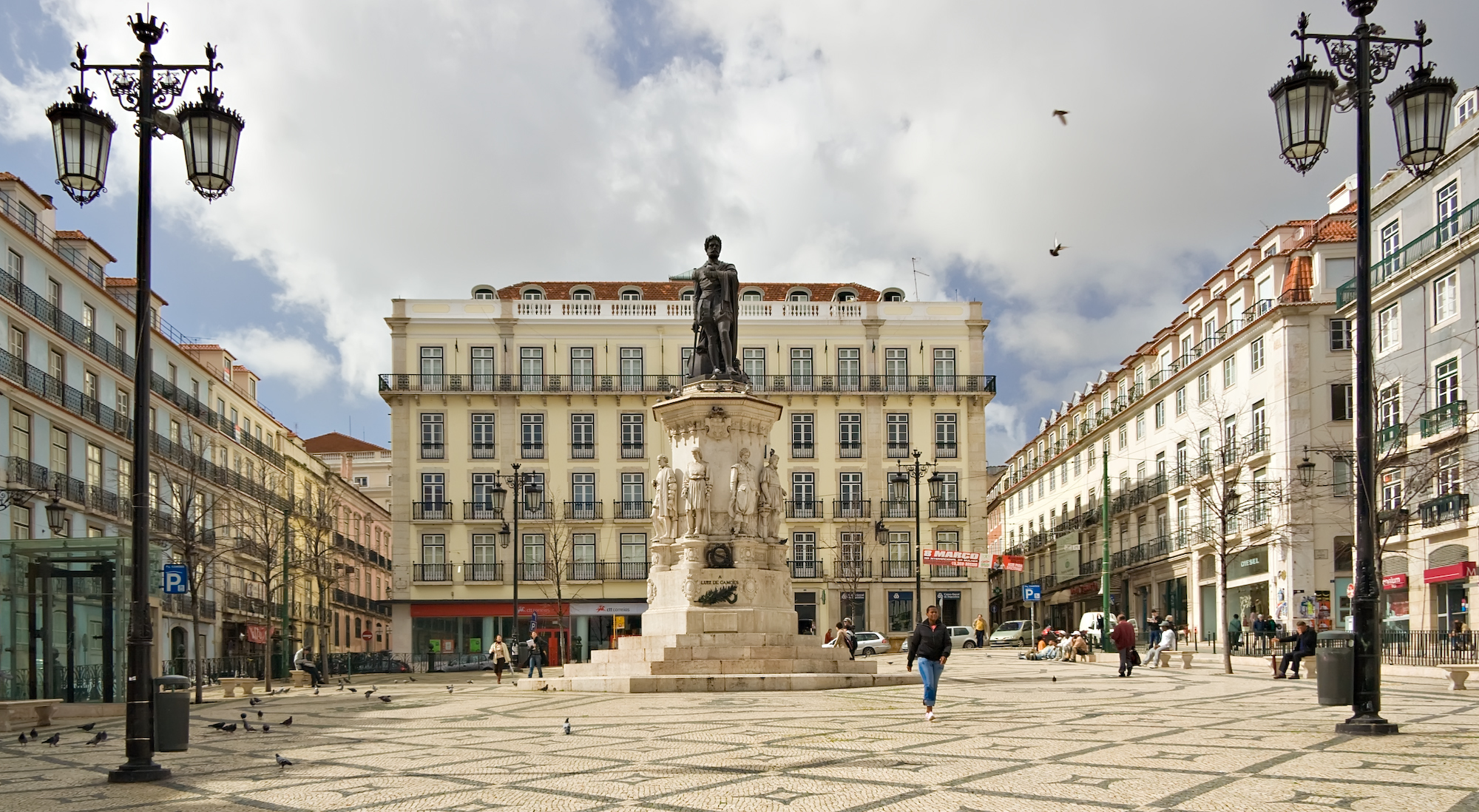
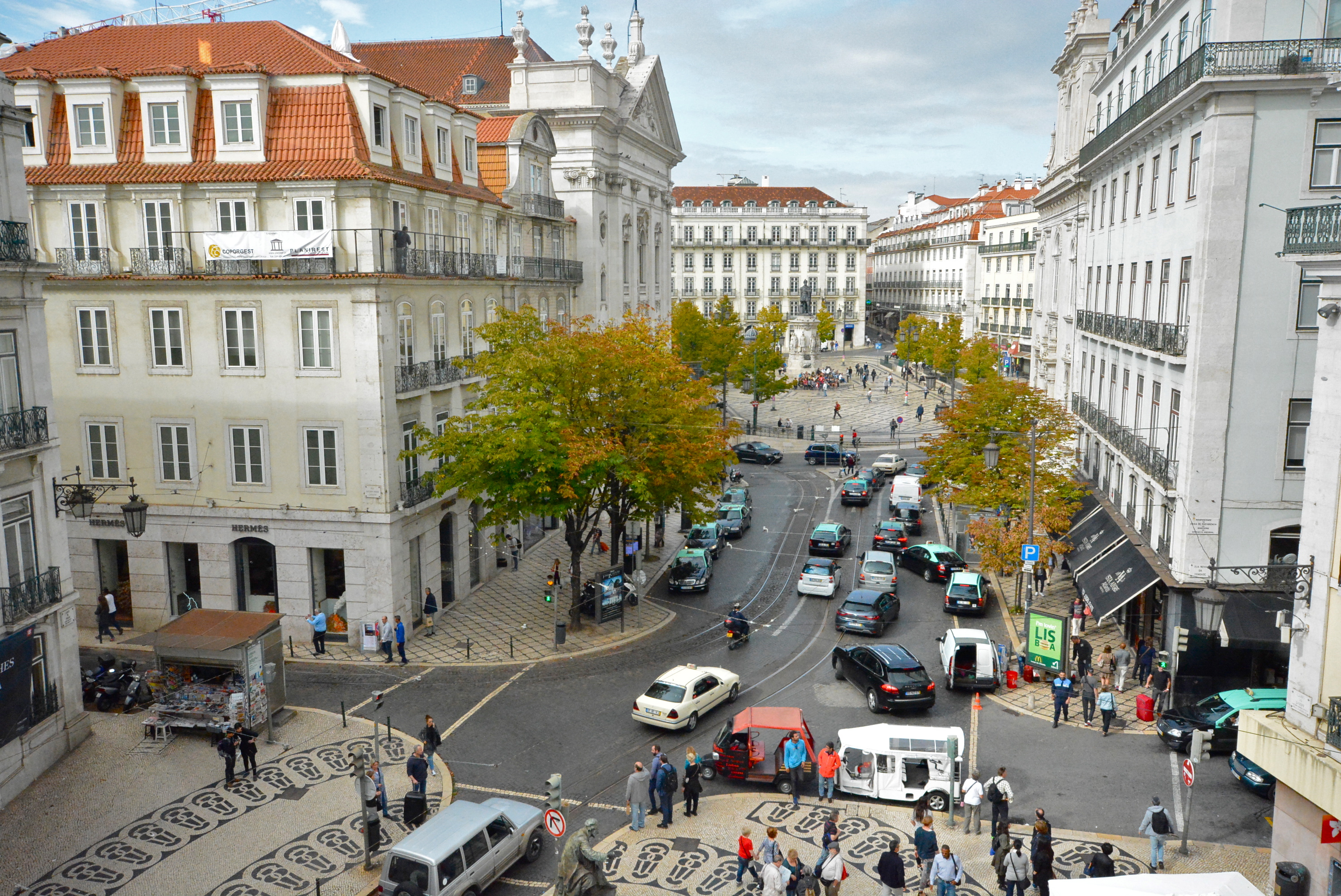
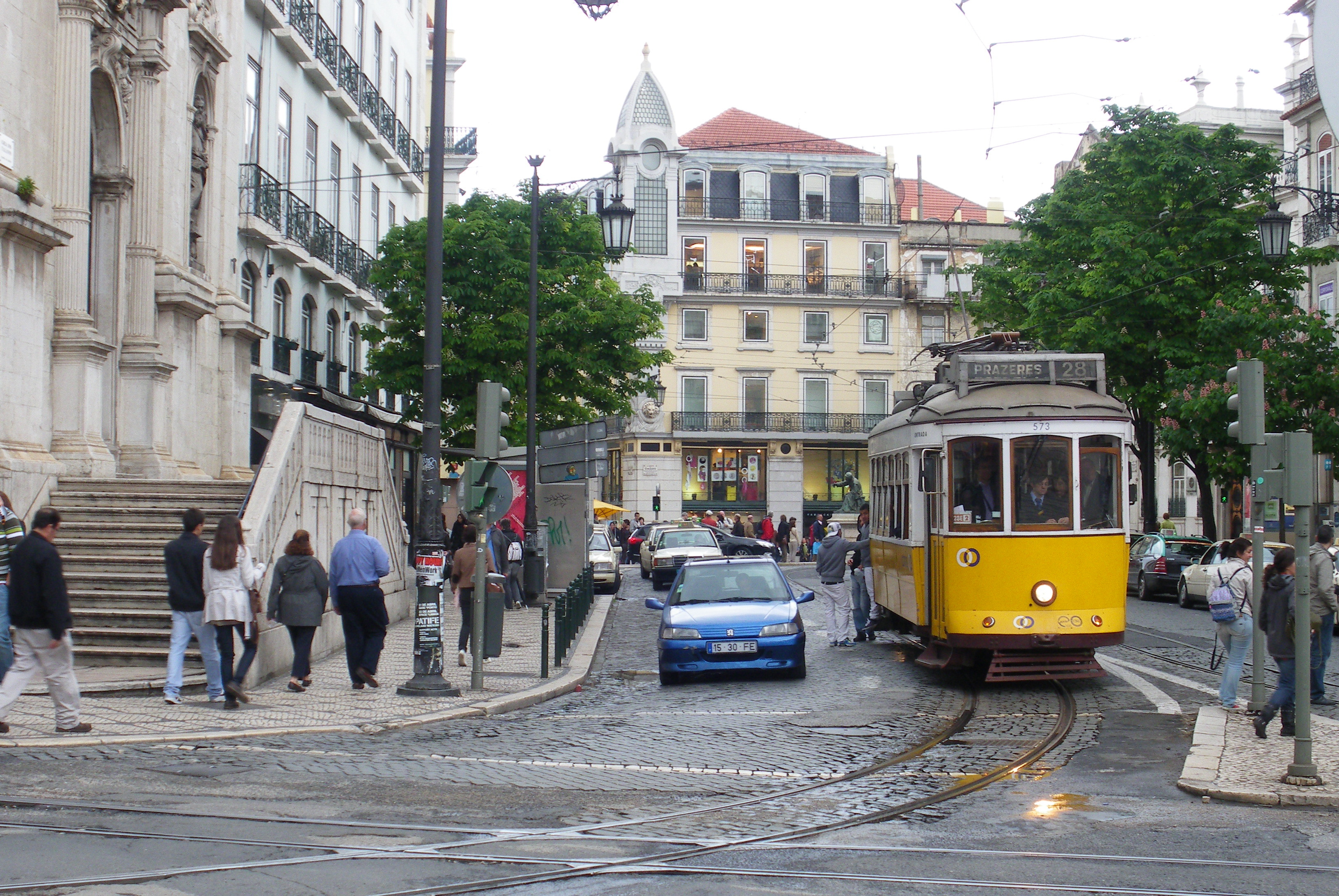
- Interactive map of Chiado
- Municipality: Lisbon
- Freguesia: Santa Maria Maior; Misericórdia
- Foundation: 1567

The Chiado (Portuguese pronunciation: [ʃiˈaðu]) is a neighborhood in the historic center of Lisbon, the capital of Portugal. Chiado is an important cultural and commercial district, known for its luxury shopping, historic landmarks, and its numerous theatres and museums. In 1988, the Chiado area was severely affected by a fire. Following an extensive rehabilitation project by Pritzker-winning architect Álvaro Siza Vieira, the Chiado has recovered and become one of the most valuable real estate markets in Portugal.

== Name ==
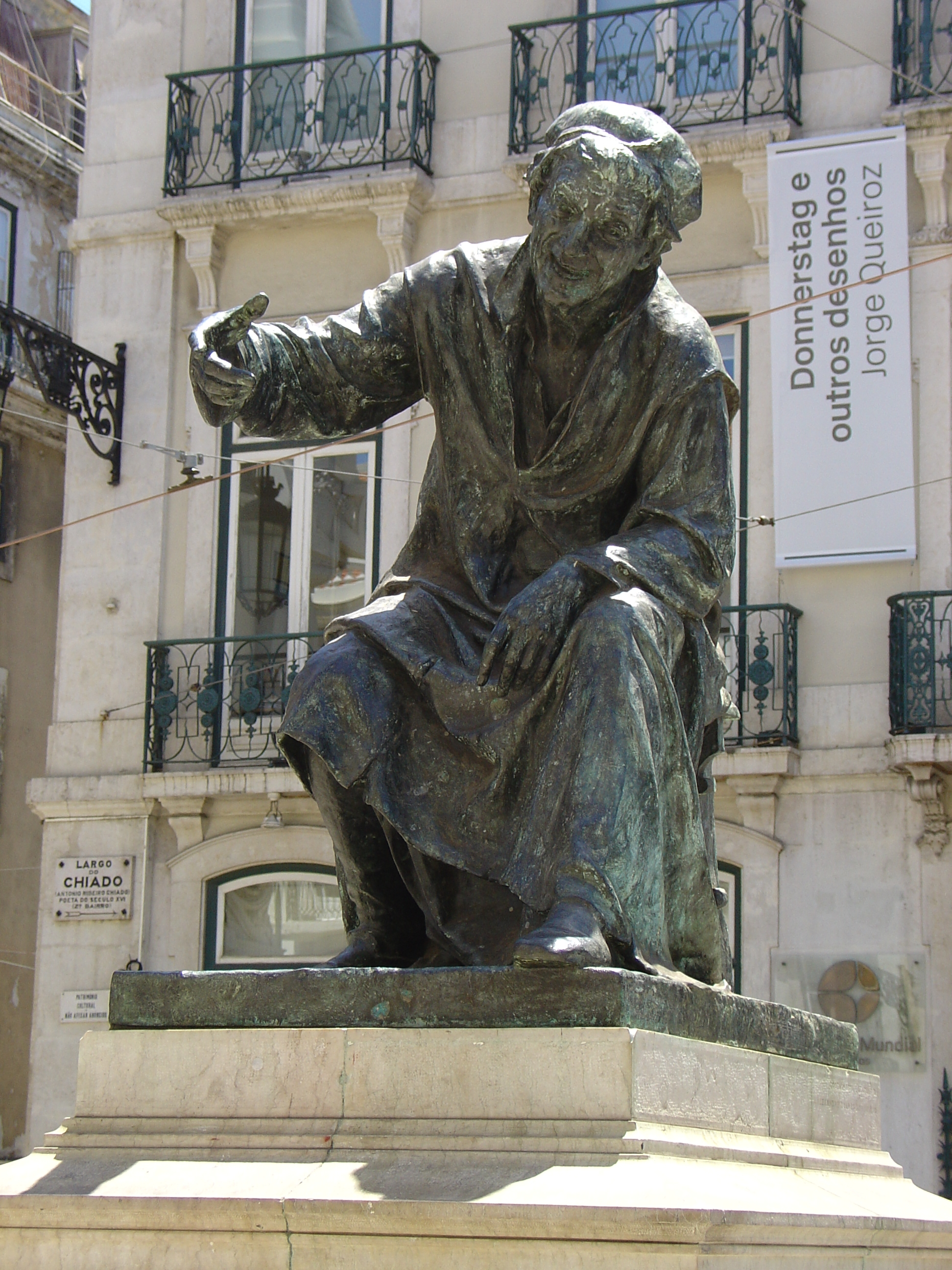
Chiado takes its name from 16th century poet António Ribeiro Chiado.

The toponym Chiado has existed since around 1567. Initially the name referred to Garrett Street, and later to the whole surrounding area. The most widely cited possible origin for the name is related to António Ribeiro (c.1520–1591), a popular poet from Évora who lived in the area and whose nickname was "chiado" ("squeak").

A bronze statue of the poet, by sculptor Costa Mota (tio), was placed in the Chiado Square in 1925.

== History ==
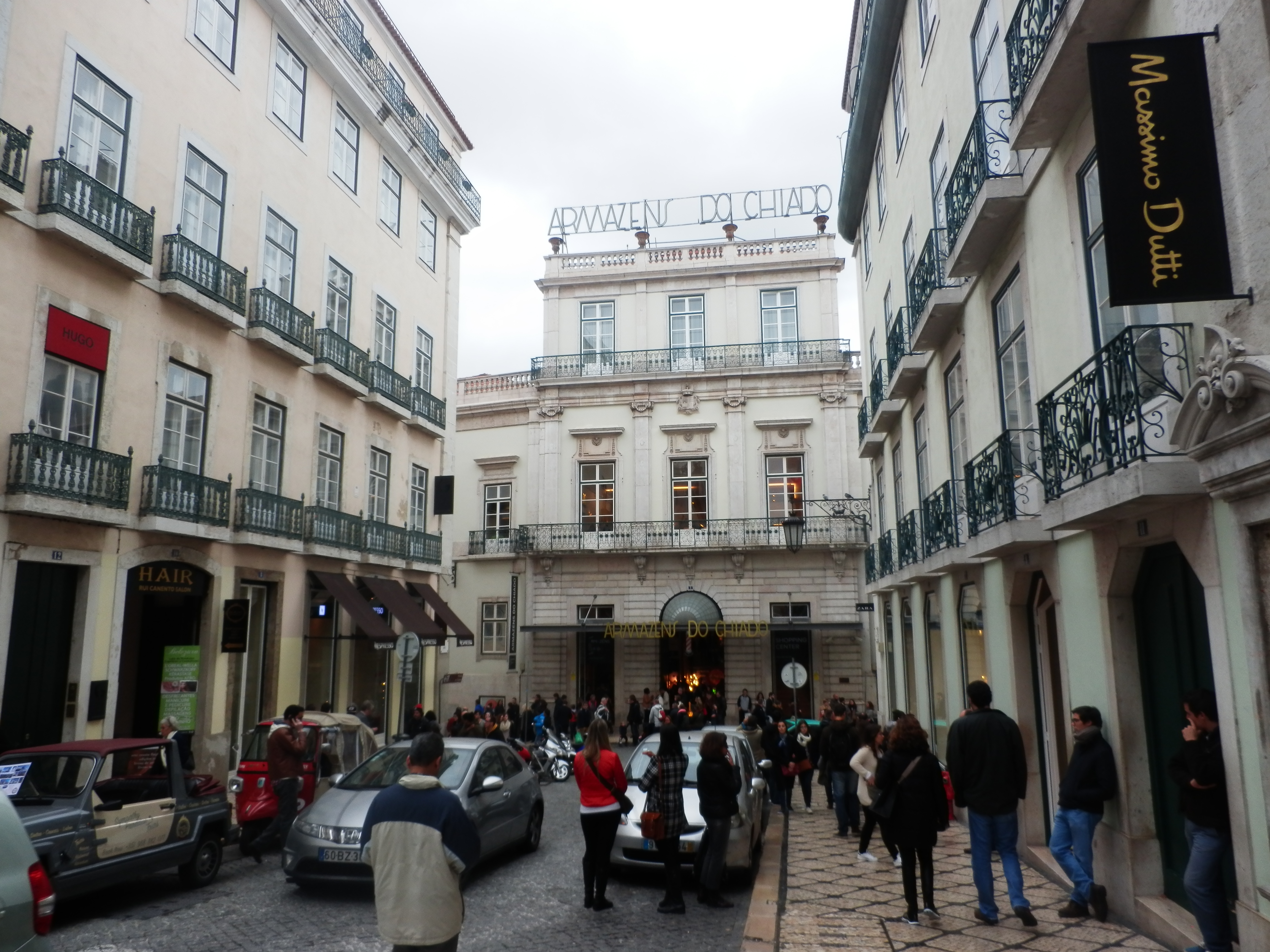
The Grandes Armazéns do Chiado.

The Chiado has been inhabited since at least Roman times, when several villae were present in the area.

Between 1373 and 1375, during the reign of King Ferdinand I, a new city wall was built that encompassed part of present-day Chiado, favouring its urbanisation and settlement. The main gate (Portas de Santa Catarina) was located in the Chiado Square.

In the 16th century, the area outside the city walls (present-day Bairro Alto) was also urbanised. The gate and walls were demolished in the early 18th century.

The 1755 Lisbon earthquake greatly affected the area, destroying houses, churches and convents. The rebuilding plan organised by the Marquis of Pombal included the Chiado, and new streets were opened to link the area with the Baixa Pombalina. New churches were rebuilt in Rococo-Baroque style, like the Mártires Basilica, Encarnação Church and the Loreto Church, the latter belonging to the Italian community of Lisbon.

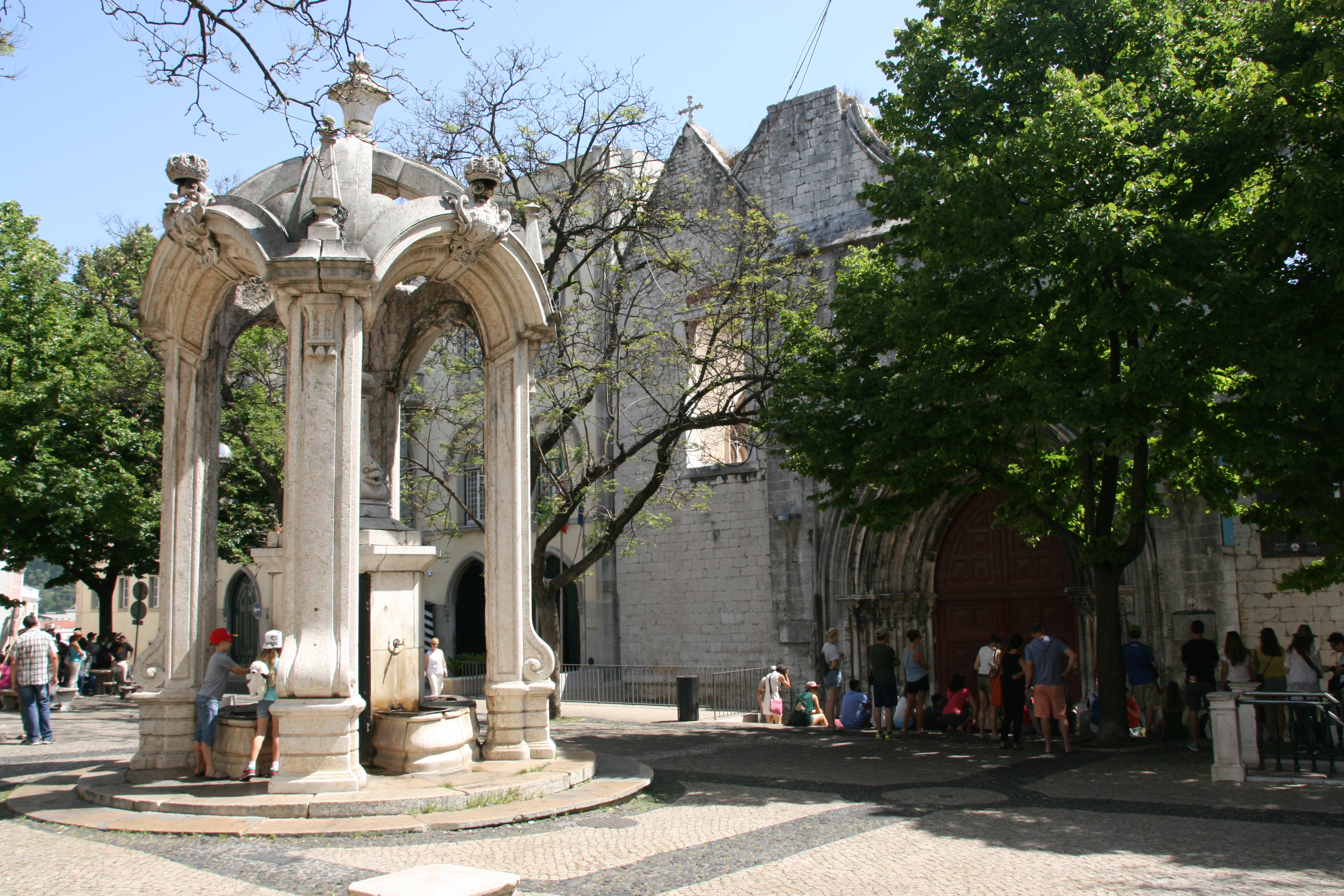
The ruins of Carmo Convent, destroyed in the 1755 Lisbon earthquake

The Rococo interior of Basilica of Our Lady of the Martyrs

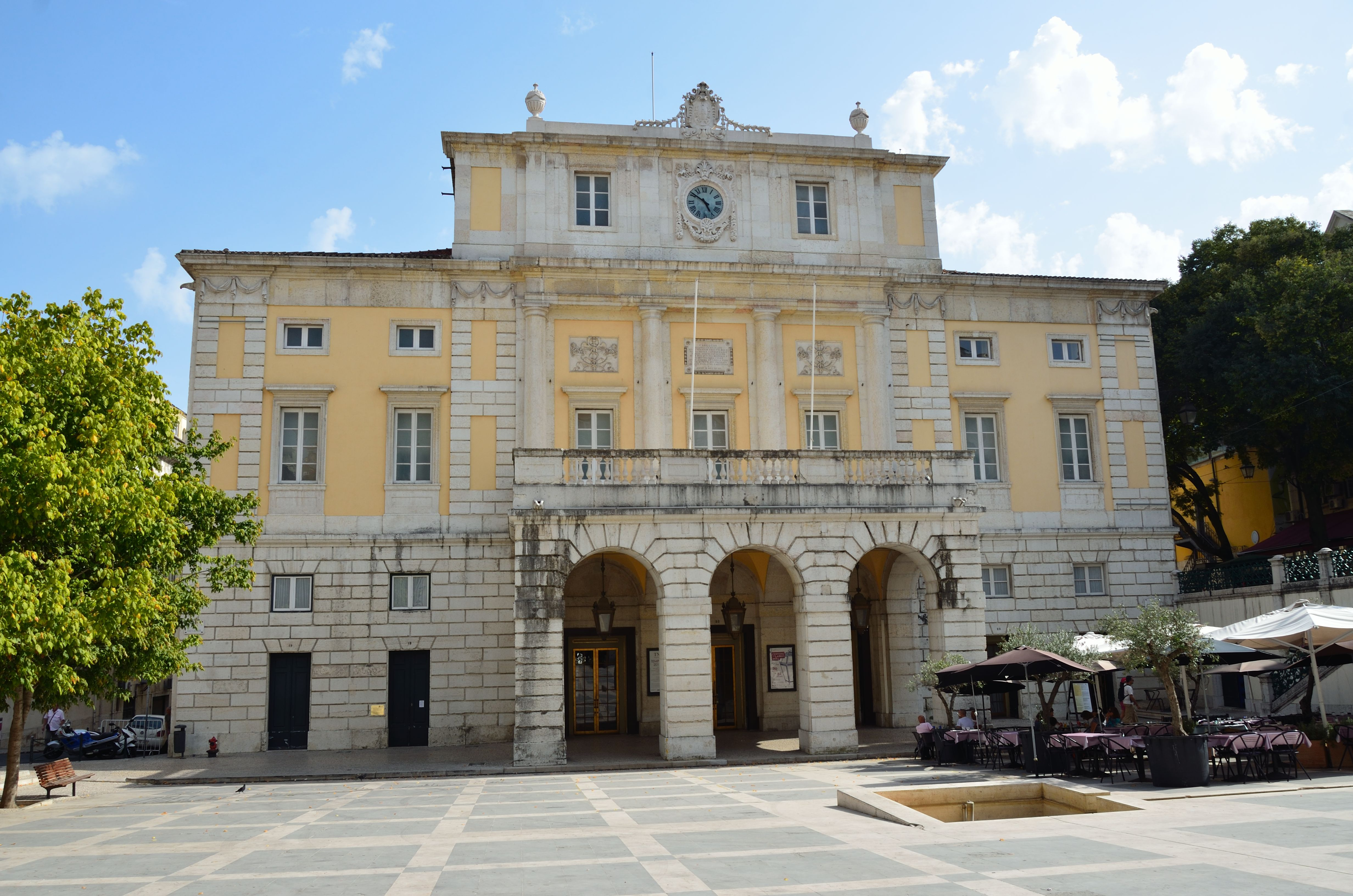
Teatro Nacional de São Carlos,
Lisbon's national opera house

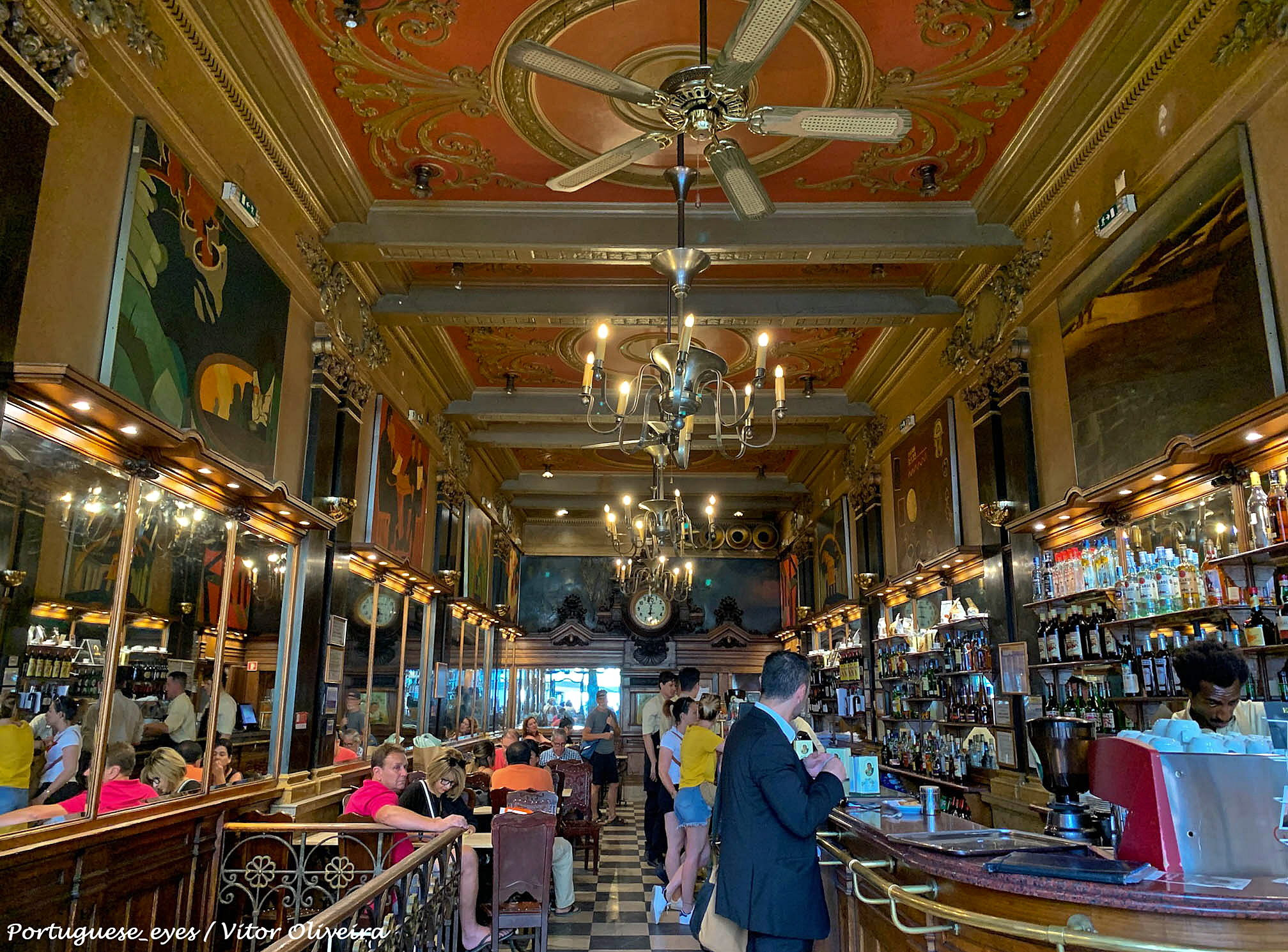
The famous Café A Brasileira, former haunt of poets such as Fernando Pessoa

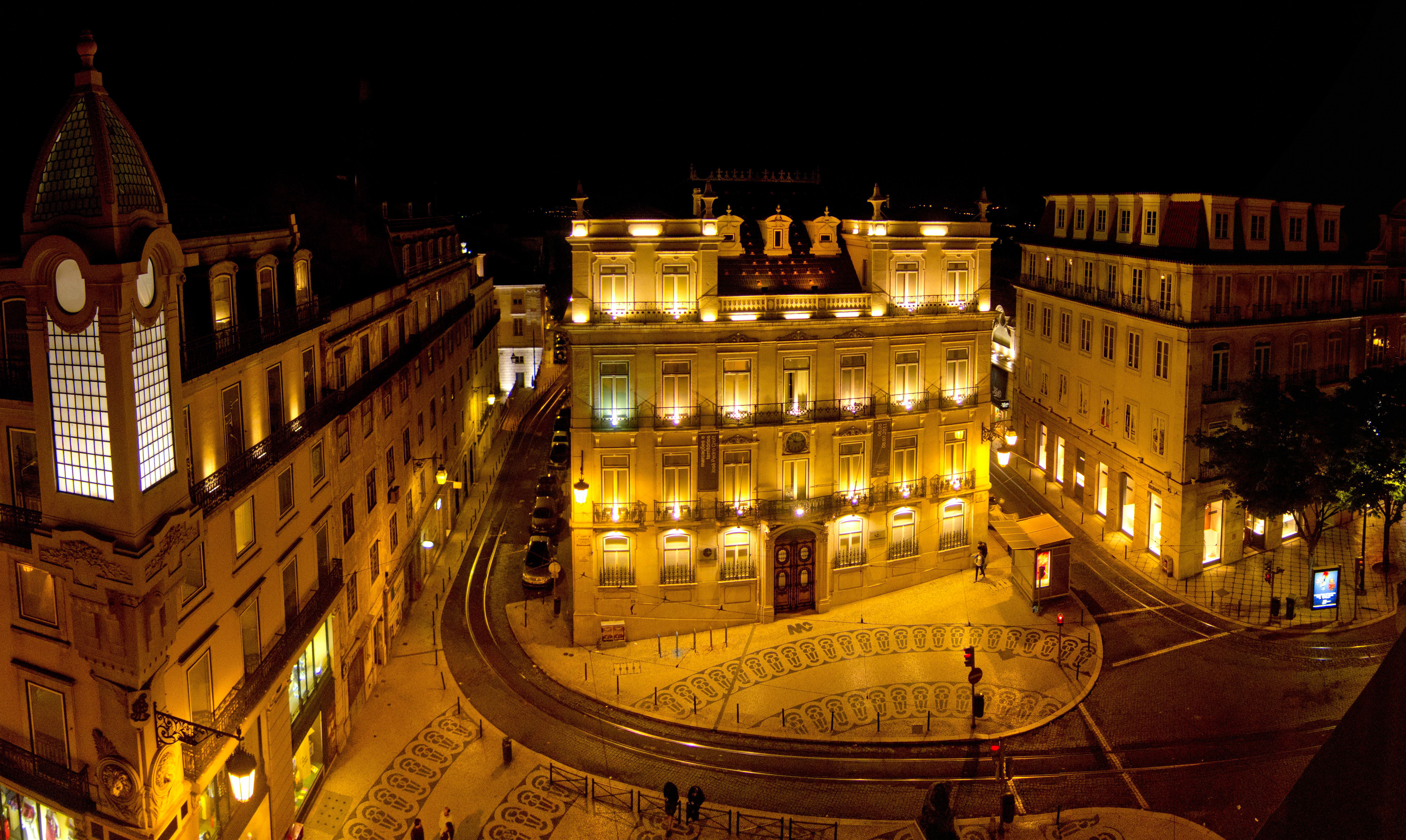
The building of Leitão & Irmão, the jewelry house

In the 18th and, especially, in the 19th century, a great number of important commercial establishments opened in the Chiado, turning it into a favourite shopping area. Some of them exist to this day, like the "Bertrand Bookshop" (opened 1747) and "Paris em Lisboa" (garment shop opened 1888). In 1792, Lisbon's opera house, the Teatro Nacional São Carlos, was inaugurated, attracting the cultural elite of the city, and other theatres were opened in the 19th century (Trindade Theatre, S. Luís Theatre).

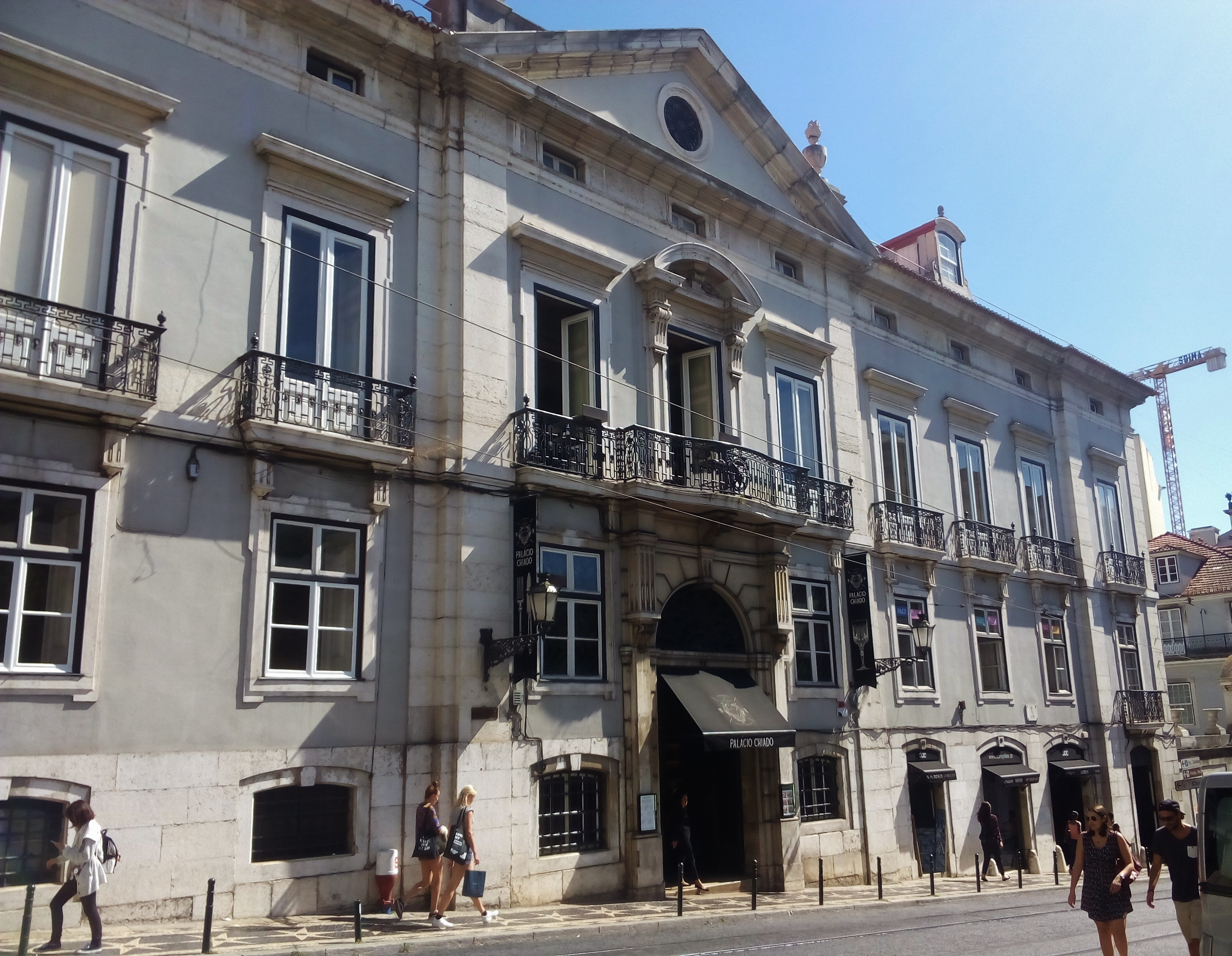
Palácio Chiado is a luxury gastronomy space, housed in the palace of the Baron of Quintela.

Museums were also created, like the Archaeological Museum in the former Carmo Church and the Museum of Contemporary Art in the former Convent of Saint Francis (now Chiado Museum). The cafés and theatres in the area were a meeting point for the aristocracy, artists, and intellectuals at least until the 1960s. It eventually became a beloved touristic site thanks to its picturesque streets and squares, cultural attractions, cafés and shops.

=== 1988 fire ===
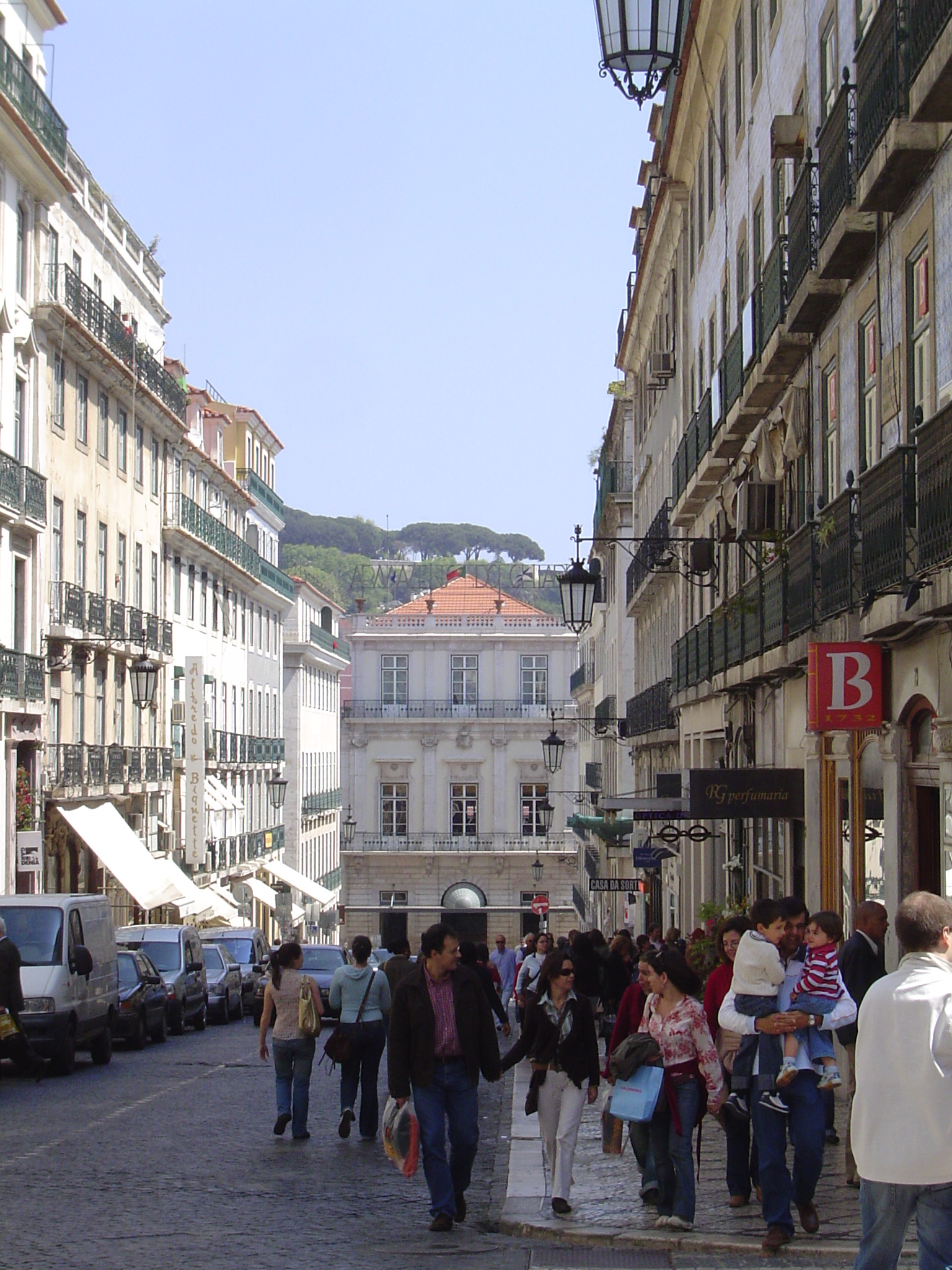
Rua Garrett, the principal shopping street in the Chiado.

In the early hours of August 25, 1988, a fire started at the Grandella department store in Rua do Carmo (Carmo Street) and quickly spread to Rua Garrett (Garrett Street) and others, affecting a total of 18 buildings (corresponding to an 8000 m^{2} land footprint) in the Chiado area, of which 11 were full losses with structure collapse, including the Armazéns do Chiado and Grandella department stores, that never reopened, along with several other historical shops also destroyed.

The fire was fought by 1,680 firefighters from throughout the country, and was put out by 16:00 local time. Several anecdotes indicate that the poorly equipped fire crews and access difficulties (especially at Rua do Carmo) combined with the extensive flammable contents (including gas bottles for sale on the stores) meant the firefighters struggled to cope with such a large scale urban fire. Two people were killed, and 73 were injured (60 of them firemen). Between 200 and 300 people lost their homes, and close to 2000 people lost their jobs. In terms of the extent of the city affected and number of destroyed buildings, the Chiado fire is often considered the worst disaster to strike the city since the 1755 Lisbon earthquake. Although it is known that the fire started with a slow combustion on the top floor of the Grandella building (which is unlikely in the event of intentional fire, that typically spreads quickly) the cause was never fully determined.

In 1989 the Portuguese architect Álvaro Siza Vieira was invited by the mayor of Lisbon Krus Abecasis to oversee the reconstruction project for the area. This rebuilding project was mostly completed by 1999, and included a shopping centre on the former Armazéns do Chiado building and the new Baixa-Chiado station of the Lisbon Metro, as well as new public spaces. The exterior look of the buildings was restored, while the interiors have been completely rebuilt according to modern construction techniques and safety regulations. The last feature of Siza's project was opened in 2015, the Terraços do Carmo, a structure comprising a series of balconies and belvederes behind the ruins of the Carmo Convent, that includes the upper landing of the Santa Justa Lift.

== Landmarks ==
- A Brasileira
- Chiado Museum
- Carmo Convent
- Teatro Nacional de São Carlos
