= Basilica of Our Lady of the Martyrs, Lisbon =

Basilica of Our Lady of the Martyrs
- Basílica de Nossa Senhora dos Mártires
- Basilica of Our Lady of the Martyrs
- 38.7104°N 9.1414°W
- Location: Lisbon
- Country: Portugal
- Denomination: Roman Catholic Church

The Basilica of Our Lady of the Martyrs (Portuguese: Basílica de Nossa Senhora dos Mártires ) Is a Catholic church located on Rua Garrett, in Chiado, Lisbon, Portugal in the parish of St Mary (in the territory of the old parish of the Martyrs). Made in the baroque and late neoclassical style, it is an example of the quality of religious architecture in the context of the Pombaline rearrangement of Lisbon.

The parish of Our Lady of the Martyrs was created immediately after the reconquest of Lisbon from the Moors in 1147. Its origin was a small chapel built to be able to house the image of the Virgin brought by English crusaders, was called by people "Our Lady of the Martyrs" in memory of all the soldiers who died in combat in defense of the Christian faith. According to tradition, D. Afonso Henriques requested the help and protection of the Virgin, and in it, the first baptism was made in the city after the Reconquest.

By 1755, the hermitage was already a large baroque church when it was completely destroyed during the earthquake that hit Lisbon that year. The current basilica was designed by Reinaldo Manuel dos Santos, after having been dedicated by the religious authorities in March 1784.

== See also ==
- Roman Catholicism in Portugal
- National Shrine of the North American Martyrs

Internal view

== Gallery ==
Main façade

High altar

Organ and choir loft

Ceiling painting: Dedication of the church to Our Lady of the Martyrs by Afonso I

Side altars and pulpit

Baptistry and baptismal font
