= Timeline of Guimarães =

The following is a timeline of the history of the city of Guimarães, Portugal.

== 18th century ==
- 1737
  - The construction of the Saint Peter's Basilica starts.
- 1750
  - 11 November – The Saint Peter's Basilica is consecrated.
- 1751
  - The Saint Peter's Basilica receives the title of minor basilica by Pope Benedict XIV.
- 1755
  - 1 November – The 1755 Lisbon Earthquake is strongly felt in Guimarães, but little to no damage is reported.

== 19th century ==
- 1871
  - 11 July – By decree, Simão Gattai obtains authorisation to build an “American railway” between Porto and Braga via Trofa and Guimarães, at no cost to the State.
- 1874
  - 28 October – Simão Gattai endorses the concession to the MDRCL (Minho District Railway Company Limited), a British company that will now be responsible for building the line that serves Guimarães.
- 1875
  - Construction of the planned railway line is handed over to Sandiforth Griffin, who only manages to lay 6 km of track before abandoning the project due to bankruptcy, meaning work towards Guimarães is thus interrupted. After this, John Dixon replaces Griffin and completes the first section of the line, but with poor quality and excessive costs, leading to payment problems that would later lead to legal complications.
- 1879
  - 1 January – The Porto Commercial Court recognizes the bankruptcy of the MDRCL, causing the company to lose all rights to the contract for the line serving Guimarães. As a result, the government revokes the decrees that had awarded the contract. Later, the concession is put up for public auction four times and is eventually sold to the new company Companhia do Caminho de Ferro de Guimarães (CCFG) for 31 contos, a price that did not cover Dixon's credit claims on the work, which includes the section to Guimarães.
  - 16 April – The government transfers the concession (conditional upon the formation of a public limited company and the acquisition at auction of the works carried out) via Decree, to Soares Veloso and the Viscount of Ermida, with a view to resuming construction of the line that passes through Guimarães.
  - 16 May – A proposal is made in Parliament to grant the new concessions the same tax exemptions that other companies had, but the process does not move forward because the contractor Dixon claims property rights over the work.
- 1880
  - 5 August – Is passed a Decree changing the track gauge to 1 metre, with the aim of speeding up construction and facilitating operation.
  - 18 August – The concession to the CCFG becomes definitive after it fulfilled the conditions of the 16 April 1879 Decree.
- 1882
  - 6 February – The issue of customs exemption is discussed again by banker Pinto Leite, as without this exemption, construction could not proceed.
  - 15 April – Members of Parliament approve the customs exemption.
  - 16 May – Peers approve the customs exemption.
  - 2 June – The customs exemption becomes law and construction of the Guimarães Line finally begins. During this period, John Dixon requests assistance from the British government due to his investments in Portugal. The Portuguese government, represented by Minister Hintze Ribeiro, argues that only the courts can decide on Dixon's claims, which only happened in 1889.
- 1883
  - 31 December – The Guimarães Line (railway) was inaugurated with the opening of the section between Trofa and Vizela.
- 1884
  - 14 April – The Guimarães railway station is inaugurated with the opening of the section between Vizela and Guimarães.
- 1894
  - The Botequim do Vagomestre, located at the Toural Square, ceases all activities and closes.
- 1899
  - 6 September – Emídio Guerreiro is born in Oliveira do Castelo.

== 20th century ==
- 1900
  - Population: 54,910.
- 1902
  - The Casa Correia de Matos is built.
- 1907
  - 21 July – The final section of the Guimarães Line, between Guimarães and Fafe, is inaugurated.
- 1922
  - 22 September – Vitória Sport Clube is founded at the Café Milenário, located in the Toural Square.
- 1945
  - 25 April – Alberto Martins is born in Guimarães.
- 1955
  - 25 August – Domingos Bragança is born in Abação.
- 1957
  - 5 September – Luís Marques Mendes is born in Azurém.
- 1970
  - The Affordable Housing District, a small complex of four four-storey buildings located across the street from the Martins Sarmento High School, is built.
- 1973
  - 1 July – Zé Amaro is born in Briteiros.
- 1977
  - 6 October – Ricardo Araújo is born in Guimarães.
- 1983
  - 6 November – Francisca Almeida is born in Guimarães.
- 1984
  - 29 November – Sofia Escobar is born in Guimarães.
- 1986
  - 24 January – Vieirinha is born in Guimarães.
- 1988
  - 19 October – Vitória S.C. wins the Portuguese Super Cup against FC Porto.
- 1994
  - 9 September – André de Freitas is born in Guimarães.

== 21st century ==
- 2001
  - Population: 159,576
- 2005
  - 29 June – Emídio Guerreiro dies at the age of 105 in Azurém.
- 2009
  - 23 October – A fire partially burns the historic houses As Filipinas.
- 2012
  - 1 January – Becomes the European Capital of Culture.
- 2013
  - 1 January – Becomes the European Capital of Sport.
  - 26 May – Vitória S.C. wins the Portuguese Nacional Cup against S.L. Benfica.
  - 28 June – The City of Guimarães is made an Honorary Member of the Ancient, Most Noble and Enlightened Military Order of Saint James of the Sword, of the Scientific, Literary and Artistic Merit.
  - 29 September – Socialist Domingos Bragança wins the local elections with 47.61% of the votes, becoming President of the Municipal Council of Guimarães.
- 2016
  - 23 October – A fire partially destroys the Casa de Cimães.
- 2017
  - 1 October – Domingos Bragança wins a second term as President of the Municipal Council of Guimarães with 51.52% of the votes following the local elections.
- 2021
  - 26 September – Domingos Bragança wins a third term as President of the Municipal Council of Guimarães with 48.06% of the votes following the local elections.
- 2024
  - 3-7 April – The 2024 European Trampoline Championships take place in Guimarães.
  - 7 May – The City Council launches the new version of the Cm-guimaraes.pt, the official website of the city.
- 2025
  - 12 October – Social Democrat Ricardo Araújo wins the local elections with 45.33% of the votes, ending 36 consecutive years of Socialist Party governance in the municipality.
  - 25 October – Ricardo Araújo officially takes the office of President of the Municipal Council of Guimarães.
  - 20 November – Guimarães hosts the PME Excelência 2024 awards ceremony at the Multiusos, with Prime-Minister Luís Montenegro attending to award nearly 4,000 Portuguese small and medium-sized enterprises.
  - 11 December – Distinguished by BBC as one of the "20 best places to travel in 2026"
- 2026
  - 1 January – Becomes the European Green Capital.

== See also ==
- Guimarães history
- History of Guimarães
- Guimarães Municipal Chamber
- List of buildings and structures in Guimarães
- Timelines of other cities/municipalities in Portugal: Braga, Coimbra, Funchal (Madeira), Lisbon, Porto, Setúbal
