= Timeline of Setúbal =

City of Portugal

The following is a timeline of the history of the municipality of Setúbal, Portugal.

== Prior to 20th century ==
- 1249 - Foral (charter) initiated.
- ca. 1490
  - Monastery of Jesus of Setúbal founded.
  - Setúbal Aqueduct built.
- 1531 - 26 January: Earthquake.
- 1570 - Our Lady of Grace church built.
- 1755 - 1 November: Earthquake.
- 1765 - Poet Manuel Maria Barbosa du Bocage born in Setubal.
- 1814 - Roman ruins of Tróia discovered near Setubal.
- 1836 - Doca Delpeut (dock) built.
- 1850 - Roman ruins of Tróia near Setubal excavated.
- 1858 - Earthquake.
- 1859 - Cisne do Sado newspaper begins publication.
- 1860
  - Correio de Setúbal newspaper begins publication.
  - Setúbal attains city status.
- 1861 - Setúbal Station opens; Linha do Sul begins operating.
- 1871 - Bocage monument erected.
- 1899 - Comércio de Setúbal newspaper begins publication.
- 1900 - Population: 22,074.

== 20th century ==
- 1909
  - Republican Congress held.
  - Benavente earthquake causes some damage.
- 1910
  - 4–5 October: City Hall burns down.
  - Vitória F.C. (football club) formed.
- 1911 - Population: 30,346.
- 1913 - Campo dos Arcos (sport field) established.^{(pt)}
- 1917 - União Futebol Comércio e Indústria football club formed.
- 1920 - Apeadeiro de Fontainhas - Sado railway station opens.
- 1923 - Junta Autónoma das Obras do Porto e Barra de Setúbal e do Rio Sado established to oversee the Port of Setúbal.
- 1926 - City becomes seat of the newly formed Setúbal District.
- 1927 - Setúbal Football Association organized.
- 1933 - Banco de Portugal building constructed.
- 1956 - Cineclube de Setúbal formed.
- 1962 - Estádio do Bonfim (stadium) opens.
- 1965 - Arquivo Distrital de Setúbal (archive) established.
- 1966 - Cais Comercial (commercial pier) built in the port.
- 1975 - Roman Catholic Diocese of Setúbal established; Manuel da Silva Martins becomes bishop.
- 1976 - Teatro Animação de Setúbal (theatre) founded.
- 1981 - Instituto Politécnico de Setúbal opens.
- 1982 - City twinned with Beauvais, France.
- 1983 - City joins the Associação de Municípios do Distrito de Setúbal.
- 1985
  - Rádio Azul begins broadcasting.
  - Roll-on/roll-off terminal built in the port.
- 1986 - 14 July: Bombing by Organização Revolucionária Armada.
- 1993 - Ford automotive plant begins operating (approximate date).
- 1998 - Gilberto Canavarro dos Reis becomes bishop.

== 21st century ==
- 2001
  - Mun-setubal.pt website online (approximate date).
  - Population: 113,934.
  - Carlos de Sousa becomes mayor.
- 2006 - Maria das Dores Meira becomes mayor.
- 2011
  - Population: 121,185.
- 2015 - José Ornelas Carvalho becomes bishop.
- 2025 - During an April power outage Setubal hospital had back up electricity generators, but did not have any water supply.

== Images ==
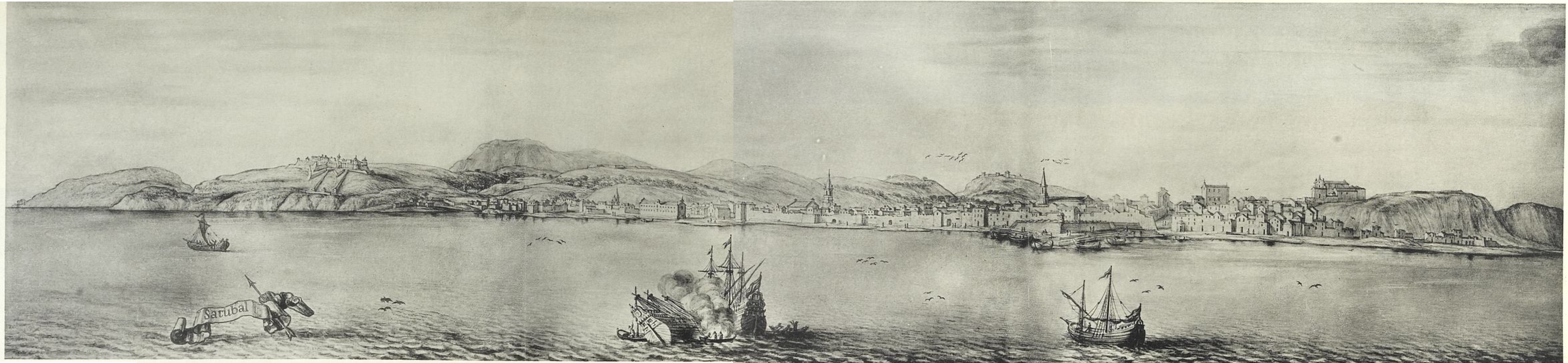
Drawing done by Pier Maria Baldi in 1669. View of Setúbal from the river Sado.

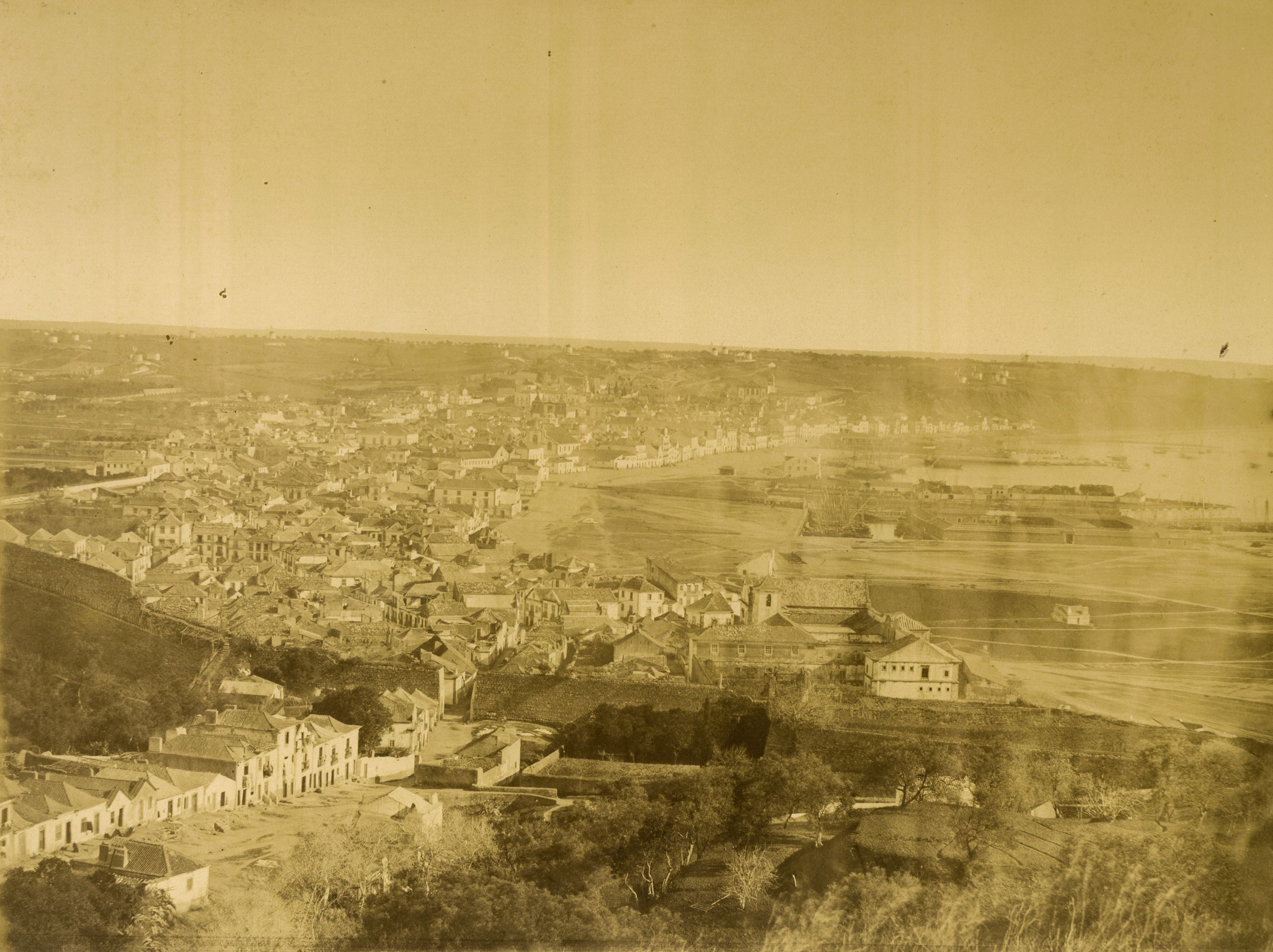
View of Setubal, 1860

== See also ==
- Cetóbriga, Roman settlement
- List of heritage sites in Setúbal District
- List of governors of Setúbal District
- Other names of Setúbal (e.g. St Ubes)
- List of cities in Portugal
- Category:City timelines, for other cities/municipalities in Portugal: Braga, Coimbra, Funchal (Madeira), Guimarães, Lisbon, Porto

== Bibliography ==
in English

- "Setubal", Handbook for Travellers in Portugal, Murray's hand-book Portugal, Madeira, Azores, and Canaries (4th ed.), London: J. Murray, 1887, hdl:2027/hvd.hn2ha1
- "Setubal", Spain and Portugal, Leipsig: K. Baedeker, 1908
- "Setubal" . Encyclopædia Britannica. Vol. 24 (11th ed.). 1910. p. 707.

in Portuguese

- "Setubal". Revista Popular (in Portuguese). 2 (26). Lisbon: Imprensa Nacional. 1849. OCLC 47789830.
- Ramalho Ortigão (1876). "Setubal". As praias de Portugal. Guia do banhista e do viajante (in Portuguese). Porto: Livraria Universal de Magalhães & Moniz.
- Alberto Pimentel (1877). Memoria sobre a historia e administração do municipio de Setubal (in Portuguese). Lisbon: G. A. Gutierres da Silva.
- Pinho Leal (1880). "Setubal". Portugal Antigo e Moderno: Diccionario... (in Portuguese). Vol. 9. Mattos Moreira. hdl:2027/gri.ark:/13960/t8tb3th34.
- Manuel Pinheiro Chagas, ed. (1883). "Setubal". Diccionario Popular (in Portuguese). Vol. 11. Lisbon: Joaquim Germano de Sousa Neves. pp. 376–378.
- "A cidade de Setubal". Portugal Artistico (in Portuguese) (9). Magalhães & Moniz. 1904. OCLC 17345411.
- Esteves Pereira; Guilherme Rodrigues, eds. (1912). "Setubal". Portugal: Diccionario Historico... (in Portuguese). Vol. 6. Lisbon: Joao Romano Torres. pp. 865+. hdl:2027/gri.ark:/13960/t4km37622. OCLC 865826167.
- Vanda Isabel Pereira Martins (2013). História do cineclubismo em Portugal: o caso do Cineclube de Setúbal (1956-1962) (MA) (in Portuguese). Universidade de Évora. hdl:10174/16340.
- Manuela Tome; et al. (2016), Geo-morfo-evolução de Setúbal e Évora: paralelismos e diversidades [Geo-morphological evolution of Setúbal and Évora: parallels and differences] (in Portuguese), Rede Lusófona de Morfologia Urbana – via Universidade de Évora
