= Timeline of Braga =

The following is a timeline of the history of the city of Braga, Portugal.

== Prior to 20th century ==
- ca. 41 BCE – Installation of Roman milestones begins.
- ca.16 BCE – Roman Bracara Augusta founded.
- 3rd C. CE – Town walls built.
- ca.300 CE – Victor of Braga is martyred.
- 4th C. CE – Roman Catholic diocese of Braga established.
- 5th C. CE – Suevi in power.
- ca.450s – Roman Catholic Archdiocese of Braga established.
- ca.485 – Visigoths in power.
- 561-563 – Religious council meets in Braga.
- 572 – Religious council meets in Braga.
- 675 – Religious council meets in Braga.
- 8th C. – Moors in power.
- 1040 – Braga taken by forces of Ferdinand I.
- 1089 – Braga Cathedral consecrated.
- 1093 – Braga becomes seat of royal court (until 1147).
- 1417 – Fernando da Guerra becomes archbishop.
- 1494 – Printing press in operation.
- 1616 – Ponte do Prado (bridge) to Vila Verde rebuilt.
- 1642 – Construction of Igreja de Santa Cruz (church) begins.
- 1756 – Braga City Hall built.
- 1841 – Biblioteca Pública de Braga (library) founded.
- 1857 – Public gas lighting installed.
- 1858 – Population: 30,175.
- 1875 – Ramal de Braga (railway) begins operating; Braga railway station opens.
- 1880 – Rua D. Frei Caetano Brandão (street) developed.
- 1882 – Bom Jesus do Monte Funicular begins operating.
- 1888 – Livraria Cruz (bookshop) in business.
- 1893 – Public electric lighting installed.
- 1900 – Population: 24,202.

== 20th century ==
- 1911 – Population: 24,647 in town; 382,461 in district.
- 1914 – Braga electric tram begins operating.
- 1915 – Theatre Circo (theatre) opens.
- 1917 – Arquivo Distrital de Braga (archive) founded.
- 1918 – D. Diogo de Sousa Museum founded.
- 1919 – Diário do Minho newspaper begins publication.
- 1921 – S.C. Braga (football club) formed.
- 1926 – 28 May 1926 coup d'état begins in Braga.
- 1929 – Airfield begins operating in Palmeira.
- 1936 – City becomes seat of newly formed Minho Province.
- 1950 – Estádio Municipal 28 de Maio (stadium) opens.
- 1955 – Jardim de Santa Bárbara (garden) created.
- 1961 – Hospital opens.
- 1963 – Trolleybus begins operating.
- 1973 – University of Minho established.
- 1977 – Mesquita Machado becomes mayor (almost continually until 2013).
- 1978 – Biscainhos Museum opens.
- 1982 – Transportes Urbanos de Braga (transit entity) established.
- 1993 – Circuito Vasco Sameiro (vehicular racetrack) opens.
- 1999 – Braga Parque in business in São Victor.

== 21st century ==
- 2001
  - Cm-braga.pt website online (approximate date).
  - Population: 112,039 in city; 831,366 in district.
- 2002 – Pavilhão das Goladas (arena) opens.
- 2003 – Estádio Municipal de Braga (stadium) opens.
- 2004
  - Completion of the works of modernization and electrification of Oporto–Braga railway line, which included the construction of a new building for Braga railway station. The modernisation allowed the extension of the high-speed Alfa Pendular trains from Oporto to Braga, a service which started on June 5, 2004.
  - Biblioteca Lúcio Craveiro da Silva (library) opens.
  - Part of UEFA Euro 2004 football contest played in Braga.
- 2011 – Population: 181,819 in city; 848,185 in district.
- 2013
  - Ricardo Rio becomes mayor.
  - União das Freguesias de Braga created.
- 2014 – Organ Festival of Braga begins.
- 2016 – Nova Arcada opens, after years of suspended work from its previous owner.

== See also ==
- Braga history
- History of Braga
- Ecclesiastical history of Braga
- List of mayors of Braga since 1836
- List of bishops of Braga
- List of governors of Braga district (in Portuguese)
- List of heritage sites in Braga district
- Timelines of other cities/municipalities in Portugal: Coimbra, Funchal (Madeira), Guimarães, Lisbon, Porto, Setúbal

== Bibliography ==
=== in English ===
- William Smith, ed. (1865) [1854]. "Bracara Augusta". Dictionary of Greek and Roman Geography. Boston: Little, Brown. hdl:2027/nnc1.0063610590.
- "Braga", Handbook for Travellers in Portugal, Murray's hand-book Portugal, Madeira, Azores, and Canaries (4th ed.), London: J. Murray, 1887, pp. 131+, hdl:2027/hvd.hn2ha1
- "Braga". Chambers's Encyclopaedia. London. 1901. hdl:2027/njp.32101065312876.
- Tirso López (1907). "Archdiocese of Braga". Catholic Encyclopedia. New York – via Google Books.
- "Braga" . Encyclopædia Britannica. Vol. 4 (11th ed.). 1910. pp. 375–376.
- "Braga", Spain and Portugal (4th ed.), Leipsic: Karl Baedeker, 1913, OCLC 34871901
- "Local History, Portugal: Braga". Catalog of the William B. Greenlee Collection of Portuguese History...in the Newberry Library. Chicago: Newberry Library. 1953. hdl:2027/mdp.39015023946240 – via HathiTrust. (Bibliography)

=== in Portuguese ===
- Luís Cardoso, ed. (1751). "Braga". Diccionario geografico, ou, Noticia historica de todas as cidades...de Portugal (in Portuguese). Vol. 2. Lisbon: Regia Officina Sylviana and Academia Real. OCLC 987786218.
- Pinho Leal (1873). "Braga". Portugal Antigo e Moderno: Diccionario... (in Portuguese). Vol. 1. Mattos Moreira. pp. 432+.
- "Braga". Diccionario encyclopedico ou novo diccionario da lingua portugueza (in Portuguese) (4th ed.). Lisbon: Francisco Arthur da Silva. 1874. OCLC 14951122.
- Carlos Augusto da Silva Campos, ed. (1886), "Negociantes e industriaes das provincias e ilhas: Braga", Almanach Commercial de Lisboa (in Portuguese), pp. 224–228
- José Augusto Vieira (1887), "Braga", O Minho Pitoresco (in Portuguese), vol. 2, Lisbon: Parceria A. M. Pereira, pp. 7–80
- Bernardino José de Senna Freitas (1890–1891). Memorias de Braga (in Portuguese). Braga: Imprensa Catholica.
- Albano Bellino (1895). Inscripções e lettreiros da cidade de Braga (in Portuguese). Porto: Typographia Occidental.
- Esteves Pereira; Guilherme Rodrigues, eds. (1906). "Braga". Portugal: Diccionario Historico... (in Portuguese). Vol. 2. Lisbon: Joao Romano Torres. hdl:2027/nyp.33433004990440. OCLC 865826167.
- Eduardo Pires de Oliveira. As alterações toponímicas 1380–1980, Braga, 1982
- Eduardo Pires de Oliveira et al. Braga Evolução da Estrutura Urbana, Braga, 1982
- José Marques. Braga Medieval, Braga, 1983
- Alberto Feio, (1984), Coisas Memoráveis de Braga (in Portuguese)
- José Manuel da Silva Passos, (1996), O Bilhete Postal Ilustrado e a História Urbana de Braga (in Portuguese), Lisbon
