= Timeline of Funchal =

The following is a timeline of the history of the city of Funchal, Madeira, Portugal.

== Prior to 20th century ==
- 1493 - Cathedral of Funchal construction begins.
- 1514 - Roman Catholic Diocese of Funchal established.
- 1566 - Sack of Funchal.
- 1835 - Town becomes part of the newly created administrative Funchal District.
- 1836
  - Associação Commercial founded.
  - Synagogue of Funchal built (approximate date).
- 1838 - Biblioteca Municipal do Funchal (library) founded.
- 1846 - José Silvestre Ribeiro becomes district governor.
- 1851 - Jewish Cemetery of Funchal established.
- 1876 - Diário de Notícias da Madeira newspaper begins publication.
- 1883 - Paços do Concelho do Funchal (town hall) in use.
- 1888 - Teatro Municipal Baltazar Dias (theatre) opens.
- 1893 - Monte Railway and horsecar tram begin operating.
- 1900 - Population: 20,850.

== 20th century ==
- 1910 - C.D. Nacional and C.S. Marítimo (football clubs) formed.
- 1911 - Population: 24,687 in town; 169,777 in district.
- 1927
  - Jornal da Madeira newspaper begins publication.
  - Campo dos Barreiros (sport field) opens.
- 1931 - Arquivo Distrital do Funchal (archive) founded.
- 1935 - Fernão de Ornelas becomes mayor.
- 1940 - Mercado dos Lavradores (market) built.
- 1957 - Estádio dos Barreiros (stadium) built.
- 1964 - Madeira Airport begins operating.
- 1972 - Duas Torres (hi-rise) built.
- 1976 - Casino da Madeira in business.
- 1979 - City twinned with Honolulu, Hawaii, United States.
- 1980 - City twinned with Livingstone, Zambia.
- 1984 - City twinned with New Bedford, Massachusetts, United States.
- 1985
  - City joins the regional Associação de Municípios da Região Autónoma da Madeira.
  - City twinned with Maui, Hawaii, United States.
- 1987
  - Correio da Madeira newspaper begins publication.
  - Horários do Funchal (transit entity) established.
  - City twinned with Cape Town, South Africa.
- 1988
  - University of Madeira and Banco Internacional do Funchal established.
  - City twinned with Santos, São Paulo, Brazil.
- 1991 - City twinned with Herzliya, Israel.
- 1992 - May: Associação Nacional de Municípios Portugueses meets in Funchal.
- 1993 - City twinned with Oakland, California, United States.
- 1994
  - Miguel Albuquerque becomes mayor.
  - City twinned with Marrickville, Australia.
- 1996 - City twinned with Fremantle, Australia, and Leichlingen, Germany.
- 1998 - Estadio Eng. Rui Alves (stadium) opens.
- 2000
  - Cm-funchal.pt website online (approximate date).
  - Funchal Cable Car begins operating.

== 21st century ==
- 2001
  - Population: 103,961.
  - MadeiraShopping in business.
- 2003 - City twinned with Praia, Cape Verde.
- 2005 - Festival Internacional de Cinema do Funchal begins.
- 2008 - City twinned with Ílhavo, Portugal, and Saint Helier, United Kingdom.
- 2009 - City twinned with Gibraltar, United Kingdom.
- 2010 - 20 February: 2010 Madeira floods and mudslides.
- 2013 - Paulo Cafôfo becomes mayor.
- 2014 - Iº Sarau Anual de Poesia Madeirense
- 2016
  - August: Wildfire.
  - City twinned with Angra do Heroísmo, Portugal.
- 2017 - Funchal local election, 2017 held.

== See also ==
- Funchal history
- List of mayors of Funchal
- List of governors of Funchal District (in Portuguese)
- List of bishops of Funchal
- History of Madeira
- Timelines of other cities/municipalities in Portugal: Braga, Coimbra, Guimarães, Lisbon, Porto, Setúbal

== Bibliography ==
in English

- "Funchal", Handbook for Travellers in Portugal, Murray's hand-book Portugal, Madeira, Azores, and Canaries (4th ed.), London: J. Murray, 1887, hdl:2027/hvd.hn2ha1
- A. Samler Brown (1903), "Funchal", Brown's Madeira, Canary Islands and Azores (7th ed.), London: Sampson Low, Marston & Co.
- "Funchal" . Encyclopædia Britannica. Vol. 11 (11th ed.). 1910. p. 301.
- "Funchal", The Mediterranean: Seaports and Sea Routes, including Madeira, the Canary Islands, the Coast of Morocco, Algeria, and Tunisia, Leipzig: Karl Baedeker, 1911, OCLC 490068

in Portuguese

- Manuel Pinheiro Chagas, ed. (1879). "Funchal". Diccionario Popular (in Portuguese). Vol. 5. Lisbon: Diario Illustrado. hdl:2027/mdp.39015087705284.
- Carlos Augusto da Silva Campos, ed. (1886), "Negociantes e industriaes das provincias e ilhas: Funchal", Almanach Commercial de Lisboa (in Portuguese), pp. 244–245
- Esteves Pereira; Guilherme Rodrigues, eds. (1907). "Funchal". Portugal: Diccionario Historico... (in Portuguese). Vol. 3. Lisbon: Joao Romano Torres. hdl:2027/nyp.33433004990432. OCLC 865826167.
