= Timeline of Porto =

The following is a timeline of the history of the city of Porto, Portugal.

== Prior to 19th century ==
- 5th-4th C. BCE - "Fortified settlement of Cale" active.
- 540 CE - Visigoths in power (approximate date).
- 559 CE - Church of São Martinho de Cedofeita built.
- 588 CE - Roman Catholic Diocese of Porto established.
- 716 - Moors in power.
- 997 - Christians in power.
- 1120 - "Ecclesiastical city" founded per "royal endowment."
- 12th C.- Porto Cathedral construction begins.
- 1234 - Church of São Francisco built.
- 1238 - Church of Saint Domingos built.
- 1325 - Custom House built.
- 1370s - Construction of Fernandina Wall completed.
- 1386 - Judiaria do Olival (Jewish quarter) established.^{(pt)}
- 1410 - Church of São Francisco rebuilt.
- 1520s - Rua das Flores (street) opens.
- 1548 - Inquisition begins.
- 1559 - Igreja da Misericórdia do Porto (church) built.
- 1580 - 24 October: Capture of Porto by Spanish forces.
- 1582 - Tribunal da Relação do Porto (law court) established.
- 1622 - Printing press in operation.
- 1628 - Tax revolt.
- 1661 - Tax revolt.
- 1692 - Igreja da Venerável Ordem Terceira de São Francisco (church) construction begins.
- 1703 - Methuen Treaty on wines taxes facilitated export of port wine.
- 1734 - Episcopal Palace construction begins.
- 1750s - Clérigos Church built.
- 1756 - Douro Wine Company founded.
- 1757 - Unrest "against the wine monopoly."
- 1762 - Rua de Cedofeita (street) opens.
- 1763 - Clérigos Church tower built.
- 1764 - Cadeia da Relação (courthouse and prison) built.
- 1770 - Hospital de Santo António construction begins.
- 1779 - Igreja da Lapa (church) consecrated.
- 1790 - British Factory House built.
- 1798 - Teatro do Príncipe (theatre) opens.

== 19th century ==
- 1806 - Ponte das Barcas (bridge) built.
- 1808 - Anti-French unrest.
- 1809
  - 28 March: First Battle of Porto; French forces defeat Portuguese.
  - 12 May: Second Battle of Porto; French defeated.
- 1820 - Military insurrection in Porto launches Portuguese Liberal Revolution of 1820.
- 1832 - July: Siege of Porto begins during the Portuguese Civil War.
- 1833
  - August: Siege ends.
  - Royal Library of Porto and title of Duke of Porto established.
- 1834 - Associação Comercial do Porto founded.
- 1842 - Palácio da Bolsa (stock exchange) construction begins.
- 1843 - Ponte pênsil D. Maria II (bridge) opens.
- 1846 - 6 October: "Military revolt."
- 1854 - Comércio do Porto newspaper begins publication.
- 1855 - Oporto Cricket and Lawn Tennis Club founded.
- 1858 - Population: 81,200.
- 1859 - Teatro Baquet (theatre) opens.
- 1864 - Population: 86,751.
- 1865 - 18 September: 1865 International Exhibition opens in Porto; Crystal Palace built.
- 1868 - O Primeiro de Janeiro newspaper and Gazeta Literária do Porto begin publication.
- 1870 - Alfândega Porto Congress Centre built.
- 1872 - Horsecar tram begins operating.
- 1876 - Municipal Library of Porto established.
- 1877
  - Campanhã railway station opens.
  - Construction of Linha do Norte (railway) to Lisbon completed.
  - Maria Pia Bridge opens.
- 1878 - Population: 105,838.
- 1886 - Dom Luís I Bridge opens.
- 1888
  - 20 March: Teatro Baquet burns down, killing dozens.
  - Jornal de Notícias (newspaper) begins publication.
- 1889 - Wine industry strike; crackdown.
- 1890 - Population: 138,860.
- 1891
  - January: Republican insurrection; crackdown.
  - 22 November: "Exhibition of National Manufactures" opens.
  - Funicular dos Guindais begins operating.
- 1893 - FC Porto (football club) formed.
- 1894 - Igreja Matriz do Bonfim (church) built.
- 1895 - Electric tram begins operating.
- 1896 - Paz dos Reis' A Saída do Pessoal Operário da Fábrica Confiança filmed on Rua de Santa Catarina.^{(pt)}
- 1900 - Population: 167,955.

== 20th century ==
- 1903 - Boavista F.C. (football club) formed.
- 1906 - 29 August: Floor collapses in newspaper office, killing several.
- 1908 - High Life cinema in business.
- 1909 - Population: 189,663.
- 1911
  - University of Porto established.
  - Estádio do Bessa (stadium) opens.
  - Population: 194,009 in city; 679,978 in district.
- 1912 - Invicta Film and Olympia cinema in business.
- 1913 - Campo da Constituição football playground opens.
- 1919 - January–February: Porto becomes capital of the short-lived revolutionary Monarchy of the North.
- 1920 - City Hall built.
- 1923 - Rivoli Theatre in business.
- 1926 - Faculdade de Engenharia da Universidade do Porto active.
- 1932 - Garagem do Comércio do Porto built.
- 1934 - Portuguese colonial exhibition held
- 1938 - Kadoorie Synagogue built.
- 1941 - Coliseu do Porto (theatre) opens.
- 1944 - Porto Editora (publisher) in business.
- 1946 - Sociedade de Transportes Colectivos do Porto public transit entity founded.
- 1951 - University of Porto's Botanical Garden established.
- 1952 - Estádio das Antas (stadium) opens.
- 1978 - Torre do Foco built.
- 1979 - Faculdade de Arquitectura da Universidade do Porto established.
- 1982 - City joins the regional Serviço Intermunicipalizado de Gestão de Resíduos do Grande Porto.
- 1985 - Banco Comercial Português and Banco Português de Investimento headquartered in Porto.
- 1988 - April: Associação Nacional de Municípios Portugueses meets in Porto.
- 1996 - Porto designated an UNESCO World Heritage Site.
- 1997 - Portuguese Centre of Photography founded.
- 1999
  - Serralves museum and Hotel Vila Galé built.
  - Nuno Cardoso becomes mayor.
- 2000 - Cm-porto.pt website online (approximate date).

== 21st century ==
- 2001
  - Oliveira's Porto of My Childhood documentary film released.^{(pt)}
  - 4 March: Hintze Ribeiro Bridge disaster, collapse of a bridge near Porto kills 59 people.
- 2002 - Rui Rio becomes mayor.
- 2003 - Estádio do Dragão (stadium) opens.
- 2013 - Rui Moreira becomes mayor.
- 2016 - City joins the União das Cidades Capitais Luso-Afro-Américo-Asiáticas.
- 2017 - 1 October: Portuguese local election, 2017 held.

== See also ==
- History of Porto
- List of mayors of Porto since 1822
- List of bishops of Porto
- List of heritage sites in Porto
- List of statues in Porto
- Timelines of other cities/municipalities in Portugal: Braga, Coimbra, Funchal (Madeira), Guimarães, Lisbon, Setúbal

== Bibliography ==
=== in English ===
- "Oporto", Handbook for Travellers in Portugal, Murray's hand-book Portugal, Madeira, Azores, and Canaries (4th ed.), London: J. Murray, 1887, pp. 115+, hdl:2027/hvd.hn2ha1
- John Lomas, ed. (1889), "Porto", O'Shea's Guide to Spain and Portugal (8th ed.), Edinburgh: Adam & Charles Black
- "Oporto". Chambers's Encyclopaedia. London. 1901. hdl:2027/uc2.ark:/13960/t3bz6g65j.
- "Porto", Jewish Encyclopedia, vol. 10, New York, 1905, hdl:2027/msu.31293024395141
- "Oporto" . Encyclopædia Britannica. Vol. 20 (11th ed.). 1910. pp. 137–139.
- Benjamin Vincent (1910), "Oporto", Haydn's Dictionary of Dates (25th ed.), London: Ward, Lock & Co., hdl:2027/uc2.ark:/13960/t41r6xh8t
- "Oporto", Spain and Portugal (4th ed.), Leipsic: Karl Baedeker, 1913, OCLC 34871901
- Nuno Portas; et al. (2004). "Porto Urban Region". In Antonio Font (ed.). Explosion of the City (in Catalan and English). Barcelona: Colegio de Arquitectos de Cataluña. ISBN 8496185184.
- Miguel Serra; Paulo Pinho (2011). "Dynamics of periurban spatial structures: investigating differentiated patterns of change on Oporto's urban fringe". Environment and Planning B: Planning and Design. 38 (2): 359–382. Bibcode:2011EnPlB..38..359S. doi:10.1068/b36092. S2CID 60820974.

=== in Portuguese ===
- Pinho Leal (1876). "Porto". Portugal Antigo e Moderno: Diccionario... (in Portuguese). Vol. 7. Mattos Moreira. pp. 268–554. (+ Index)
- Alberto Pimentel (1878). O Porto por fora e por dentro [Porto inside and out] (in Portuguese).
- Manuel Pinheiro Chagas, ed. (1881). "Porto". Diccionario Popular (in Portuguese). Vol. 10. Lisbon: Joaquim Germano de Sousa Neves. pp. 15–34.
- Esteves Pereira; Guilherme Rodrigues, eds. (1911). "Porto". Portugal: Diccionario Historico... (in Portuguese). Vol. 5. Lisbon: Joao Romano Torres. hdl:2027/gri.ark:/13960/t1gj3dx23. OCLC 865826167.
- Damião Peres; et al., eds. (1962–1965). História da Cidade do Porto (in Portuguese). Portucalense editora. OCLC 460632616.
- J. M. P. de Oliveira (1973). O espaço urbano do Porto: Condições naturais e desenvolvimento (in Portuguese). Coimbra.
- Marie-Therèse Mandroux-França (1984). Quatro fases de urbanização do Porto no século XVIII (in Portuguese).
- Francisco Ribeiro da Silva (1988). O Porto e o seu Termo - Os homens, as instituições e o poder (1580-1640) (in Portuguese). Câmara Municipal do Porto.
- Congresso sobre o Porto de Fim do Século (1880-1910) (in Portuguese), Ateneu Comercial do Porto, 1991 – via Biblioteca Nacional Digital
- Porto a Património Mundial (in Portuguese), 1993
- Agostinho Rebelo da Costa (2001). Descripção Topografica e Histórica da Cidade do Porto (in Portuguese) (3rd ed.). Edições Frenesi.
- Luís Miguel Duarte (2001). História do Porto em BD (in Portuguese). Edições ASA.
- Luís António de Oliveira Ramos, ed. (2001). História do Porto (in Portuguese) (3rd ed.). Porto Editora.
