= Timeline of Coimbra =

The following is a timeline of the history of the city of Coimbra, Portugal.

== Prior to 20th century ==
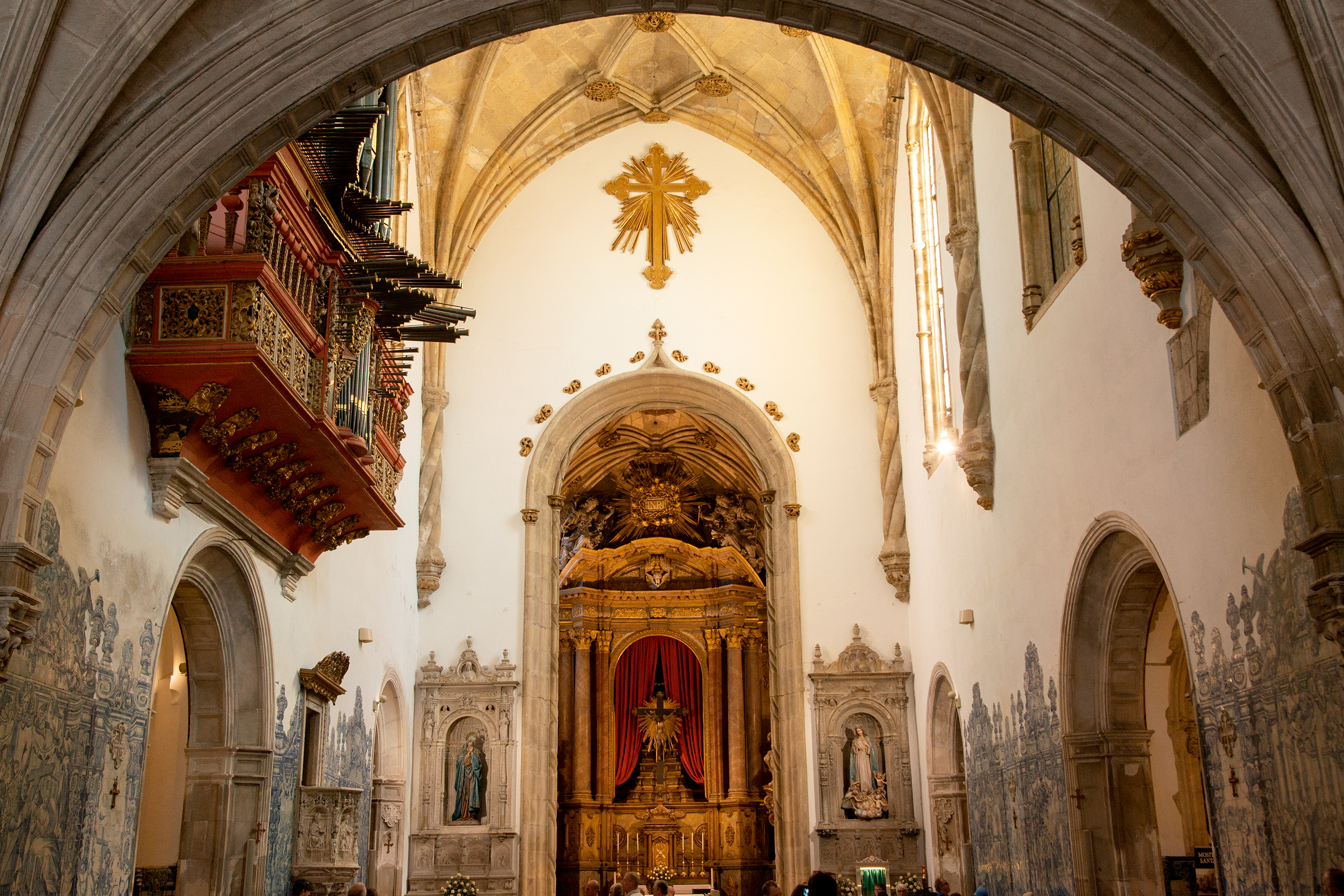
Church of São Bartolomeu (Coimbra), built in the 18th century

- ca.563 CE – Roman Catholic Diocese of Coimbra established.
- 714 CE – Muslims in power.
- 1064 – Coimbra taken by Christian forces of Ferdinand I.
- 1139 – Coimbra becomes seat of Kingdom of Portugal (until 1385).
- 1169 – San Salvador church established.
- 1211 – Cortes (assembly) held in Coimbra.
- 1286 – Monastery of Santa Clara-a-Velha founded.
- 1308 – University moves to Coimbra from Lisbon.
- 1316 – Monastery of Santa Clara-a-Velha construction begins.
- 1338 – University moves away from Coimbra back to Lisbon.
- 1354 – University again moves to Coimbra from Lisbon.
- 1355 – Queen consort Inês de Castro murdered at Quinta das Lágrimas.
- 1377 – University again moves away from Coimbra back to Lisbon.
- 1385 – Cortes held in Coimbra.
- 1398 – Cortes held in Coimbra.
- 1472 – Cortes held in Coimbra.
- 1481 – Poet Francisco de Sá de Miranda born in Coimbra.
- 1536 – Printing press in operation.
- 1537 – University once again moves to Coimbra from Lisbon.
- 1580/98 – New Cathedral of Coimbra construction begins.
- 1728 – Casa da Livraria (library) built.
- 1733 – University clocktower built.
- 1755 – 1 November: Earthquake.
- 1810 – Coimbra "sacked by the French under Marshal Massena."
- 1812 – Jornal de Coimbra (newspaper) begins publication.
- 1834 – Miguel I of Portugal, makes the city his headquarters.
- 1835 – Town becomes part of newly created administrative Coimbra district.
- 1846 – "Miguelist insurrection" occurs.
- 1852 – Instituto de Coimbra founded.
- 1874 – Horsecar tram begins operating.
- 1885 – Coimbra Station opens; Ramal da Coimbra (railway) begins operating.
- 1887 – Coimbra Academic Association student union formed.
- 1900 – Population: 18,144.

== 20th century ==
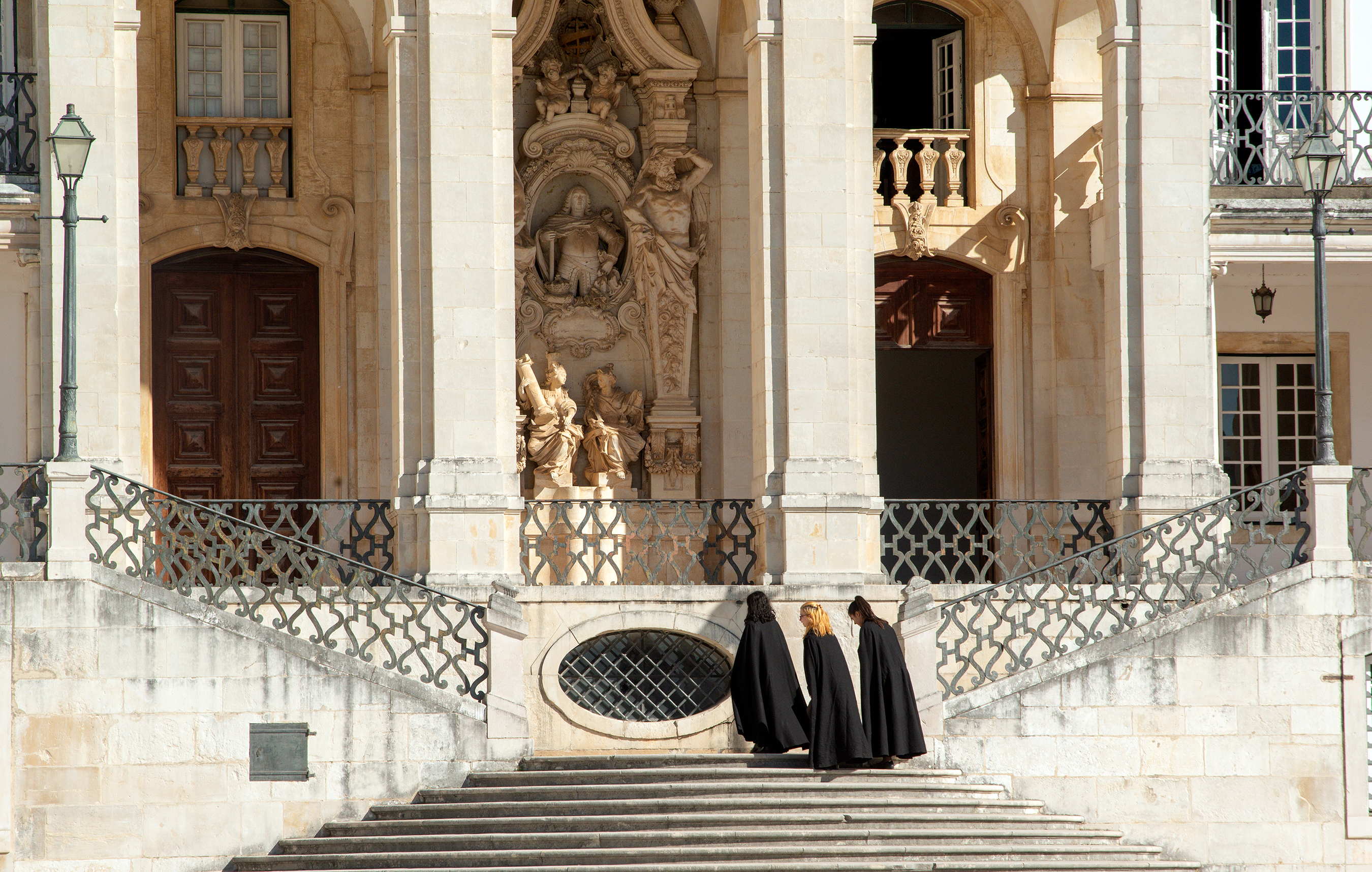
Students in robes for the first week of classes at University of Coimbra

- 1906 – Ponte Ferroviária de Dueça 1 and Ponte José Luciano de Castro (bridges) open.
- 1910 – Ancient Roman Conímbriga ruins near Coimbra designated a national monument.
- 1911
  - Electric trams begins operating.
  - Population: 20,581.
- 1930
  - Diário de Coimbra newspaper begins publication.
  - City coat of arms redesign adopted.
- 1947 – Trolleybus begins operating.
- 1954 – Ponte de Santa Clara (bridge) opens.
- 1958 – University-related Centro de Estudos Cinematográficos active.
- 1962 – University of Coimbra General Library rebuilt.
- 1963 – Coimbra University Stadium opens.
- 1970 – May: Student unrest.
- 1981 – Açude-ponte de Coimbra (bridge) opens.
- 1982 – City joins the regional Associação Informática da Região Centro.
- 1986 – Coimbra University Radio begins broadcasting.
- 1996 – Metro Mondego transit entity formed to plan regional light rail system (as of 2017 unrealized).
- 1998 – Cm-coimbra.pt website online (approximate date).

== 21st century ==
- 2001
  - Carlos Encarnação becomes mayor.^{(pt)}
  - Population: 104,489.
- 2002 - Estádio Municipal Sérgio Conceição (stadium) built.
- 2003 - Estádio Cidade de Coimbra (stadium) opens.
- 2004
  - Ponte Rainha Santa Isabel (bridge) opens.
  - Part of UEFA Euro 2004 football contest played in Coimbra.
- 2005 – August: Wildfire burns in area around city.
- 2007 – Pedro e Inês footbridge opens.
- 2010
  - City joins the União das Cidades Capitais Luso-Afro-Américo-Asiáticas.
  - João Paulo Barbosa de Melo becomes mayor.^{(pt)}
- 2011 – July: Associação Nacional de Municípios Portugueses meets in Coimbra.
- 2013 – Manuel Machado becomes mayor.^{(pt)}
- 2017
  - June: June 2017 Portugal wildfires burn in region near city.
  - October: Coimbra local election, 2017 held.

== See also ==
- History of Coimbra
- Aeminium, Roman city
- List of mayors of Coimbra
- List of alcaldes of Coimbra (municipal magistrates)
- List of bishops of Coimbra
- List of heritage sites in Coimbra district
- Timelines of other cities/municipalities in Portugal: Braga, Funchal (Madeira), Guimarães, Lisbon, Porto, Setúbal

== Bibliography ==
in English

- John Lomas, ed. (1889), "Coimbra", O'Shea's Guide to Spain and Portugal (8th ed.), Edinburgh: Adam & Charles Black
- "Coimbra". Chambers's Encyclopaedia. London. 1901. hdl:2027/njp.32101065312884.
- "Coimbra" . Encyclopædia Britannica. Vol. 6 (11th ed.). 1910. p. 653.
- "Local History, Portugal: Coimbra". Catalog of the William B. Greenlee Collection of Portuguese History .... in the Newberry Library. Chicago: Newberry Library. 1953. hdl:2027/mdp.39015023946240 – via HathiTrust. (Bibliography)
- Trudy Ring, ed. (1996). "Coimbra". Southern Europe. International Dictionary of Historic Places. Vol. 3. Fitzroy Dearborn. ISBN 9781134259656. OCLC 31045650.

in Portuguese

- Arquivo Histórico Municipal de Coimbra, Vereações (in Portuguese)
  - no.1, ca. 1491; no.3, ca. 1518; etc.
- Luís Cardoso, ed. (1751). "Coimbra". Diccionario geografico, ou, Noticia historica de todas as cidades...de Portugal (in Portuguese). Vol. 2. Lisbon: Regia Officina Sylviana and Academia Real da História Portuguesa. OCLC 987786218.
- Anais do Município de Coimbra [Annals of Coimbra] (in Portuguese). ca. 1840–
- Antonio Luiz de Sousa Henriques Secco (1853). Memoria historico-chorographica dos diversos concelhos do districto administrativo de Coimbra (in Portuguese).
- Augusto Mendes Simões de Castro (1867). Guia historico do viajante em Coimbra (in Portuguese). Coimbra: Imprensa da Universidade.
- António Francisco Barata, ed. (1873). Historia breve de Coimbra (in Portuguese) (2nd ed.). Lisbon: Imprensa Nacional.
- Pinho Leal (1874). "Coimbra". Portugal Antigo e Moderno: Diccionario... (in Portuguese). Vol. 2. Mattos Moreira. pp. 314+.
- "Coimbra". Diccionario encyclopedico ou novo diccionario da lingua portugueza (in Portuguese). Vol. 1 (4th ed.). Lisbon: Francisco Arthur da Silva. 1874. hdl:2027/uc1.l0063741581. OCLC 14951122.
- Manuel Pinheiro Chagas, ed. (1878). "Coimbra". Diccionario Popular (in Portuguese). Vol. 3. Lisbon: Diario Illustrado. hdl:2027/nyp.33433004957100.
- Carlos Augusto da Silva Campos, ed. (1886), "Negociantes e industriaes das provincias e ilhas: Coimbra", Almanach Commercial de Lisboa (in Portuguese), pp. 233–235
- Eugénio de Castro (1900). Guia de Coimbra (in Portuguese). circa 1900
- Esteves Pereira; Guilherme Rodrigues, eds. (1906). "Coimbra". Portugal: Diccionario Historico... (in Portuguese). Vol. 2. Lisbon: Joao Romano Torres. hdl:2027/nyp.33433004990440. OCLC 865826167.
- Agostinho Rodrigues d'Andrade (1906). Guia do forasteiro em Coimbra (in Portuguese). Porto.
- Jorge de Alarcão (2008). Coimbra: a montagem do cenário urbano (in Portuguese). Imprensa da Universidade de Coimbra. ISBN 978-989-8074-30-0.
- Margarida Isabel Barreto Relvão Calmeiro (2014). Urbanismo antes dos Planos: Coimbra 1834-1934 (PhD) (in Portuguese). Universidade de Coimbra. hdl:10316/27732.
