= Timeline of Lisbon =

Coordinates: 38.713811°N 9.139386°W

The following is a timeline of the history of the city of Lisbon, Portugal.

== Prior to 15th century ==
- 205 BCE – Romans in power; Olisipo (Felicitas Julia) designated a municipio in Lusitania province.
- 57 CE – Theatre built.
- 4th C. CE – Catholic diocese of Olisipo established; Potamius becomes bishop.
- 407 CE – Alans in power.
- 585 – Visigoths in power.
- 710s – Olisipo taken by Moors; renamed "al-Ushbuni".
- 844 – City attacked by Norman forces.
- 1108 – City taken by Norwegian crusaders.
- 1110 – City taken by Almoravids under Sir b. Abi Bakr.
- 1147
  - Siege of Lisbon by Christian forces under Afonso I.
  - Lisbon Cathedral construction begins.
- 1179 – City receives charter.
- 1184 – City attacked by Muslim forces under Abu Yaqub Yusuf.
- 1242 – Convento de São Domingos de Lisboa founded.
- 1256 – Lisbon becomes capital of the Kingdom of Portugal.
- 1290 – University founded.
- 1300 – Castle of São Jorge renovated (approximate date).
- 1344 – Earthquake.^{(pt)}
- 1348 – Plague.
- 1373 – City sacked by Castilian forces.
- 1375 – Cerca Nova (city wall) built.
- 1378 – National Archive installed in the São Jorge Castle (approximate date).
- 1384 – Lisbon besieged by Castilian forces.
- 1389 – Carmo Convent founded.
- 1394 – Catholic Archdiocese of Lisbon established;
- 1395 – Serviço de Incêndios (fire brigade) organized.

== 15th–17th centuries ==
- 1422 – Lisbon "made the capital of the kingdom by John I"
- 1441 – African slave trade begins (abolished in 1836).
- 1450 – Estaus Palace built (approximate date).
- 1467 – Palácio Almada (residence) built.
- 1495 – Printing press in operation (approximate date).
- 1497 – Vasco da Gama departs from Lisbon on first voyage to India.
- 1501 – Jerónimos Monastery construction begins.
- 1504 – Hospital Real de Todos os Santos built.
- 1506 – April: Pogrom of Jews.
- 1511 – Ribeira Palace built (approximate date).
- 1514 – Restelo Hermitage built.
- 1519 – Belém Tower built.
- 1531 – Earthquake.
- 1554 – Damião de Góis' Urbis Olisiponis Descriptio published.
- 1569 – Plague.
- 1571 – Casa de Despacho da Santa Inquisição (House of the Holy Inquisition) begins functioning.
- 1572 – Brás de Albuquerque becomes Câmara Municipal senate president (i.e. mayor).^{(pt)}
- 1574 – Duarte da Costa becomes mayor.
- 1580 – 25 August: Battle of Alcântara fought near Lisbon; Spanish in power.
- 1588 – 28 May: Military Spanish Armada departs from Lisbon for England.
- 1594 – Aula do Risco (school) established.
- 1597
  - Earthquake.^{(pt)}
  - Printer Pedro Craesbeeck in business.
- 1598 - São Bento Palace originally built.
- 1601 – Jerónimos Monastery built.
- 1624 - English College, Lisbon opened.
- 1629 - Monastery of São Vicente de Fora completed.
- 1640 – December: Coup d'état; Spanish ousted.
- 1647 – Aula de Fortificação e Arquitetura Militar (school) founded.
- 1668 – February: Peace treaty between Spain and Portugal signed in Lisbon.
- 1681 – Church of Santa Engrácia construction begins.

== 18th century ==
- 1715 – Gazeta de Lisboa newspaper begins publication.
- 1720 – Academia Real da História Portuguesa founded.
- 1724 – British Cemetery opens, to cater for Protestants in the city.
- 1748 – Águas Livres Aqueduct begins operating.
- 1754 – Belém Palace built (approximate date).
- 1755
  - 1 November: Earthquake, tsunami, and fire devastate city and killed thousands.
  - Ribeira Palace destroyed.
  - Baixa Pombalina planning begins.
- 1761 – Real Barraca (royal palace) built in Ajuda near Lisbon.
- 1764 – Passeio Público (park) opens.
- 1768 – Jardim Botânico da Ajuda (garden) founded near city.
- 1769 – Lisbon Stock Exchange formed.
- 1774 – Lisbon City Archives moved into Lisbon City Hall.
- 1775 – Equestrian statue of José I erected in the Praça do Comércio.
- 1779 – Lisbon Science Academy founded.
- 1780
  - Street lighting installed.
  - Casa Pia orphanage founded.
- 1787 – Remodelled Rua Nova do Almada opens.
- 1790 – Academia Real de Fortificação, Artilharia e Desenho founded.
- 1793 – Teatro Nacional de São Carlos (theatre) opens.
- 1796 – Biblioteca Nacional de Portugal established.

== 19th century ==
- 1801 – Street name signage installed.
- 1807 – 30 November: French forces take Lisbon.
- 1808
  - French ousted by British forces.
  - Telegrafo Portuguez in publication.
- 1831 – "Military insurrection...suppressed."
- 1833 – Prazeres Cemetery established.
- 1834 – Portuguese Parliament begins meeting in the Palácio das Cortes.
- 1835 – Public Ajuda Cemetery established.
- 1836 – Academia de Belas-Artes established.
- 1837 – Sociedade Propagadora dos Conhecimentos Úteis founded.
- 1839 – Associação Marítima e Colonial headquartered in Lisbon.
- 1841 – Alto de São João Cemetery established.
- 1846
  - National Theatre D. Maria II built.
  - Grémio Literário de Lisboa founded.
- 1852 – Instituto Industrial established.
- 1856 – Associação Naval de Lisboa founded.
- 1859 – Yellow fever outbreak.
- 1864
  - Diário de Notícias newspaper begins publication.
  - Population: 190,311.
- 1865 – Santa Apolónia railway station opens.
- 1867 – Teatro da Trindade theatre opens.
- 1873
  - Horsecar tram begins operating.
  - Rua Augusta Arch erected.
- 1874 – Column of Pedro IV erected.
- 1875
  - Lisbon Geographic Society formed.
  - May: Boating accident on Tagus river kills dozens.
- 1877 – Construction of Linha do Norte (railway) to Porto completed.
- 1878
  - Astronomical Observatory of Lisbon and Jardim Botânico de Lisboa (garden) established.
  - Population: 246,343.
- 1880 – Alviella aqueduct begins operating.
- 1882
  - Marquess of Pombal Square laid out.
  - Anglo-Portuguese Telephone Company begins telephone services.
- 1883 – December: Dockyard fire occurs.
- 1884
  - National Museum of Ancient Art founded.
  - Lisbon Zoo founded.
- 1885
  - Glória Funicular begins operating.
  - Covered market built in Praça da Figueira (approximate date).
  - Belém becomes part of city.
- 1886 – Avenida da Liberdade laid out; Monument to the Restorers unveiled.
- 1887 – Linha de Sintra (railway) begins operating.
- 1890
  - Coliseu dos Recreios founded.
  - Population: 300,964.
- 1891 – Central Station and Rossio tunnel open.
- 1892 – Campo Pequeno bullring built.
- 1893 – National Archaeology Museum founded.
- 1894
  - June: Bakers conduct labor strike.
  - Pedro Augusto Franco becomes mayor.
- 1895
  - June: "Chamber of deputies" burns down.
  - Linha de Cascais railway begins operating; Cais do Sodré railway station opens.
- 1897
  - Olivais Cemetery established.
  - Zófimo Consiglieri Pedroso becomes mayor.
- 1900
  - Santa Justa Lift begins operating.
  - Population: 351,210 city; 709,509 district.

== 20th century ==
=== 1900s–1940s ===
- 1901
  - Electric tram begins operating.
  - António José de Ávila becomes mayor.
- 1902
  - Instituto de Higiene e Medicina Tropical established.
  - Ancient "chapel and tombs" discovered.
- 1903 - Visit by Edward VII commemorated by Edward VII Park.
- 1904
  - António de Azevedo Castelo Branco becomes mayor.
  - Grupo Sport Lisboa formed.
- 1905
  - Café A Brasileira opens.
  - National Coach Museum created.
- 1906
  - Colonial School and Sporting Clube de Portugal founded.
  - Lisbon Tropical Botanical Garden opens.
- 1908 – 1 February: Carlos I and his son, Luís Filipe, are assassinated in the Praça do Comércio.
- 1909
  - 23 April: Earthquake.
  - City Museum established.
- 1910
  - Anselmo Braamcamp Freire becomes mayor.
  - City becomes capital of the First Portuguese Republic.
- 1911
  - University of Lisbon and Edward VII Park established.
  - Cinema Olympia in business.
  - Population: 435,359 city; 853,415 district.
- 1916
  - 23 February: German ships seized at Lisbon; Germany subsequently declares war on Portugal, which officially enters World War I.
  - Rafael Bordalo Pinheiro Museum opens.
- 1919 – Clube de Futebol Os Belenenses founded.
- 1920 – Population: 484,664.
- 1922 – Parque Mayer theater complex opens.
- 1926
  - Ditadura Nacional (Military dictatorship) begins in Portugal.
  - Setúbal District splits away from the Lisbon District.
- 1929 – Instituto Português de Heráldica headquartered in city.
- 1930
  - Technical University of Lisbon established.
  - Lisbon Book Fair begins.
  - Population: 591,939.
- 1931
  - Hemeroteca Municipal de Lisboa (periodical library) founded.
  - Teatro Capitólio opens.
- 1932 – Estação Ferroviária do Sul e Sueste (railway station) opens.
- 1933 – City becomes capital of the fascist Portuguese Second Republic (Estado Novo) (until 1974).
- 1934 – Monsanto Forest Park formed.
- 1938
  - Duarte Pacheco becomes mayor.
  - Academia Portuguesa da História headquartered in Lisbon.
- 1940
  - 23 June: Portuguese World Exhibition opens; closes 2 December.
  - Population: 694,389.
- 1941 – 15 February: Cyclone occurs.
- 1942 – Lisbon Portela Airport opens.
- 1945 – A Bola sports newspaper begins publication.
- 1946 – Clube Oriental de Lisboa founded.
- 1947 – Grupo Surrealista de Lisboa (art group) formed.
- 1949 – Record sports newspaper begins publication.

=== 1950s–1990s ===
- 1950
  - Cinema São Jorge opens.
  - Population: 783,226 city.
- 1952 – Centro Desportivo Universitário de Lisboa founded.
- 1953 - Hospital de Santa Maria opened.
- 1954 – Estádio da Luz (stadium) opens.
- 1956
  - Estádio José Alvalade (stadium) and Teatro ABC open.
  - Calouste Gulbenkian Foundation established.
- 1959
  - Lisbon Metro begins operating.
  - António Vitorino da França Borges becomes mayor.
  - Cristo Rei statue erected.
- 1960 – Padrão dos Descobrimentos monument erected.
- 1963 – Navy Museum opens.
- 1965
  - National Museum of Ethnology established.
  - Museu Nacional do Azulejo formed.
- 1966 – 25 de Abril Bridge opens.
- 1968 – A Capital newspaper begins publication.
- 1969
  - Teatro Maria Matos opens.
  - Calouste Gulbenkian Museum opens.
- 1970
  - Fernando Augusto Santos e Castro becomes mayor.
  - Population: 769,410 city; 1,611,887 metro.
- 1971 – Empresa Pública de Urbanização de Lisboa (Public Consortium for the Urbanization of Lisbon) founded.
- 1972 – António Jorge da Silva Sebastião becomes mayor.
- 1973
  - Teatro da Cornucópia founded.
  - English College, Lisbon closed.
- 1974
  - 25 April: Military coup d'état; Lisbon subsequently becomes capital of the democratic Third Portuguese Republic.
  - Joaquim Caldeira Rodrigues becomes mayor.
- 1975
  - Lino José Góis Ferreira becomes mayor.
  - Teatro Aberto formed.
- 1977
  - Aquilino Ribeiro Machado becomes mayor.
  - National Museum of Costume and Fashion inaugurated.
- 1979 – Correio da Manhã newspaper begins publication.
- 1980
  - Instituto Português do Livro headquartered in city.
  - Nuno Krus Abecasis becomes mayor.
- 1981 – Population: 807,167 city.
- 1985
  - Lisbon joins the newly formed União das Cidades Capitais Luso-Afro-Américo-Asiáticas.
  - Torres das Amoreiras built.
  - IAAF World Cross Country Championships held.
- 1986
  - Lisbon Marathon begins.
  - March: Associação Nacional de Municípios Portugueses meets in Lisbon.
- 1989 – Diário Económico newspaper begins publication.
- 1990
  - Público newspaper begins publication.
  - Electricity Museum opens.
  - Jorge Fernando Branco de Sampaio becomes mayor.
- 1991 – Population: 663,394 city.
- 1992 – Arquivo Nacional da Torre do Tombo formed.
- 1993 – Belém Cultural Center built.
- 1994
  - World Junior Championships in Athletics held.
  - Monumento aos Combatentes do Ultramar unveiled.
- 1995
  - Blue Line (Lisbon Metro) and Yellow Line (Lisbon Metro) in operation.^{(pt)}
  - Macau Science and Culture Centre initiated.
  - João Barroso Soares becomes mayor.
- 1996 – Community of Portuguese Language Countries summit held.
- 1998
  - Fado Museum, Gare do Oriente (railway station), Lisbon Oceanarium, Teatro Camões, and Vasco da Gama Bridge open.
  - Expo '98 and Ibero-American Championships in Athletics held in Lisbon.
  - 24 Horas newspaper begins publication.
  - Pavilhão Atlântico and Vasco da Gama Tower built.
  - Dom Fernando II e Glória restored.
  - Cm-lisboa.pt website online (approximate date).
  - Green Line (Lisbon Metro) and Red Line (Lisbon Metro) in operation.

== 21st century ==
- 2001
  - IAAF World Indoor Championships held.
  - Population: 564,657.
- 2002
  - Euronext Lisbon founded.
  - Pedro Miguel de Santana Lopes becomes mayor.
- 2003
  - Doclisboa film festival begins.
  - Estádio da Luz and Estádio José Alvalade (stadiums) built.
- 2004
  - Torre São Rafael built.
  - António Pedro Nobre Carmona Rodrigues becomes mayor.
  - Allied Joint Command Lisbon formed.
- 2005 – Pedro Miguel de Santana Lopes becomes mayor, succeeded by António Pedro Nobre Carmona Rodrigues.
- 2006
  - 29 January: Snow storm occurs.
  - W.A.K.O. European Championships held.
- 2007
  - December: EU Treaty signed in Lisbon.
  - António Luís dos Santos da Costa becomes mayor.
  - Berardo Collection Museum established.
- 2008
  - 7 August: Kidnapping of hostages at Banco Espírito Santo branch in Campolide parish.
  - Museum of the Orient opens.
  - Contraditório headquartered in city.
- 2011 – Population: 547,733 city; 2,821,876 metro.
- 2012 –14 November: Anti-austerity protests.
- 2015 – Population: 504,471.
- 2017 – 1 October: Portuguese local election, 2017 held.
- 2018 – Eurovision Song Contest 2018 held.
- 2025 – 3 September: Ascensor da Glória derailment

== See also ==
- History of Lisbon
- List of mayors of Lisbon, 1840–
- List of Lisbon City Council senate presidents (1572–1821) (in Portuguese)
- List of bishops of Lisbon, since 1st century CE
- List of heritage sites in Lisbon
- Other names of Lisbon
- Timeline of Portuguese history
- Timelines of other cities/municipalities in Portugal: Braga, Coimbra, Funchal (Madeira), Guimarães, Porto, Setúbal

== Bibliography ==
=== in English ===
- Thomas Nugent (1749), "Lisbon", The Grand Tour, vol. 4, London: S. Birt, hdl:2027/mdp.39015030762580
- Abraham Rees (1819), "Lisbon", The Cyclopaedia, London: Longman, Hurst, Rees, Orme & Brown, hdl:2027/uc2.ark:/13960/t5n87hg3d
- William Smith, ed. (1865) [1854]. "Olisipo". Dictionary of Greek and Roman Geography. Boston: Little, Brown. hdl:2027/nnc1.0062450000.
- Joaquim Antonio de Macedo (1874), Guide to Lisbon and its Environs, London: Simpkin, Marshall & Co.
- George Henry Townsend; Frederick Martin (1877), "Lisbon", A Manual of Dates (5th ed.), London: Frederick Warne & Co., hdl:2027/hvd.32044088047865
- John Ramsay McCulloch (1880), "Lisbon", in Hugh G. Reid (ed.), A Dictionary, Practical, Theoretical and Historical of Commerce and Commercial Navigation, London: Longmans, Green, and Co.
- "Lisbon", Handbook for Travellers in Portugal (4th ed.), London: J. Murray, 1887, pp. 1–33, hdl:2027/hvd.hn2ha1
- "Lisbon", Jewish Encyclopedia, vol. 8, New York, 1907, hdl:2027/osu.32435029752870
- "Lisbon", Spain and Portugal, Leipsig: K. Baedeker, 1908
- Nathaniel Newnham Davis (1911), "Lisbon", The Gourmet's Guide to Europe (3rd ed.), London: Grant Richards
- "Lisbon, the City of the Friendly Bay", National Geographic Magazine, vol. 42, Washington DC, 1922, hdl:2027/mdp.39015076209421
- "Local History, Portugal: Lisbon". Catalog of the William B. Greenlee Collection of Portuguese History ... in the Newberry Library. Chicago: Newberry Library. 1953. hdl:2027/mdp.39015023946240 – via HathiTrust. (Bibliography)
- Jeremy Alden; Arturda Rosa Pires (1996). "Lisbon: Strategic planning for a capital city". Cities. 13. doi:10.1016/0264-2751(95)00111-5.
- Vítor Oliveira; Paulo Pinho (2010). "Lisbon". Cities. 27 (5): 405–419. doi:10.1016/j.cities.2009.12.008.
- Neill Lochery (2011). Lisbon: War in the Shadows of the City of Light, 1939-1945. New York: Public Affairs.
- James H. Sweet (2013). "Hidden Histories of African Lisbon". In Jorge Canizares-Esguerra; et al. (eds.). Black Urban Atlantic in the Age of the Slave Trade. University of Pennsylvania Press. ISBN 978-0-8122-0813-9.
- Annemarie Jordan Gschwend and K.J.P. Lowe, eds. (2015). The Global City: On the Streets of Renaissance Lisbon. London: Paul Holberton Publishing.
- Barry Hatton (2018). Queen of the Sea: A History of Lisbon. London: C. Hurst & Co. Ltd.
- Joke Langens and Dirk Timmerman (2022). 10 Lisbon Stories. Algés, Portugal: Casa Das Letras. Nonfiction.

=== in Portuguese ===
- Almanak estatistico de Lisboa em 1841 (in Portuguese). Typographia do gratis. 1841. OCLC 802761639. (Directory)
  - 1848 ed., 1851 ed.
- Eduardo Freire de Oliveira (1882–1911), Elementos para a historia do municipio de Lisboa (in Portuguese), Typographia Universal (17 volumes) + Index
- Carlos Augusto da Silva Campos, ed. (1886), Almanach Commercial de Lisboa (in Portuguese)
- Júlio de Castilho [in Portuguese] (1902), Lisboa Antiga [Old Lisbon] (in Portuguese) (2nd ed.), Antiga Casa Bertrand, J. Bastos
- Alfredo de Mesquita [in Portuguese] (1903). Lisboa. Portugal Pittoresco e Illustrado (in Portuguese). Empreza da Historia de Portugal. (+ via HathiTrust)
- Raul Proença, ed. (1924). Lisboa e arredores. Guia de Portugal (in Portuguese). Biblioteca Nacional de Lisboa. OCLC 958948526.
- Robélia de Sousa Lobo Ramalho, ed. (1933). Lisboa. Guia de Portugal artístico (in Portuguese). Vol. 1 – via Biblioteca Nacional Digital.
- Maria da Conceição de Oliveira Marques (1969–1972). "Introdução ao estudo do desenvolvimento urbano de Lisboa, 1879–1938" [Introduction to the study of urban development in Lisbon]. Arquitectura (in Portuguese) (112, 113, 119, 124). OCLC 959151800.
- A. Matos; F. Portugal (1974). Lisboa em 1758: Memórias Paroquiais de Lisboa (in Portuguese). Coimbra Editora. OCLC 252645744.
- Maria João Madeira Rodrigues [in Portuguese] (1978), Tradição, transição e mudança: A produção do Espaço urbano na Lisboa oitocentista [Tradition, transition and change: The production of urban space in Lisbon in the 19th century], Boletim Cultural (in Portuguese), Assembleia distrital de Lisboa, OCLC 84483453
- Francisco Santana; Eduardo Sucena, eds. (1994). Dicionário da história de Lisboa (in Portuguese). Carlos Quintas & Associados. ISBN 9729603006.
- José-Augusto França (1997). Lisboa: Urbanismo e arquitetura (in Portuguese). Livros Horizonte.
- Maria Helena Lisboa (2002). Os engenheiros em Lisboa. Urbanismo e arquitetura (1850–1930) [Engineers in Lisbon: Urbanism and architecture]. Cidade de Lisboa (in Portuguese). Livros Horizonte. ISBN 972-24-1214-0.
- Rita Gago (2005). "O surgimento do conceito de urbanismo: teorias e práticas na Câmara Municipal de Lisboa" [Emergence of the concept of urbanism: theories and practices in the Lisbon City Council]. Cadernos do Arquivo Municipal (in Portuguese). 8. Lisbon. ISSN 0873-9870.
- Dejanirah Couto (2006). História de Lisboa (in Portuguese) (10th ed.). Gótica. ISBN 9727920462. (Translated from French)
