= List of mayors of Coimbra =

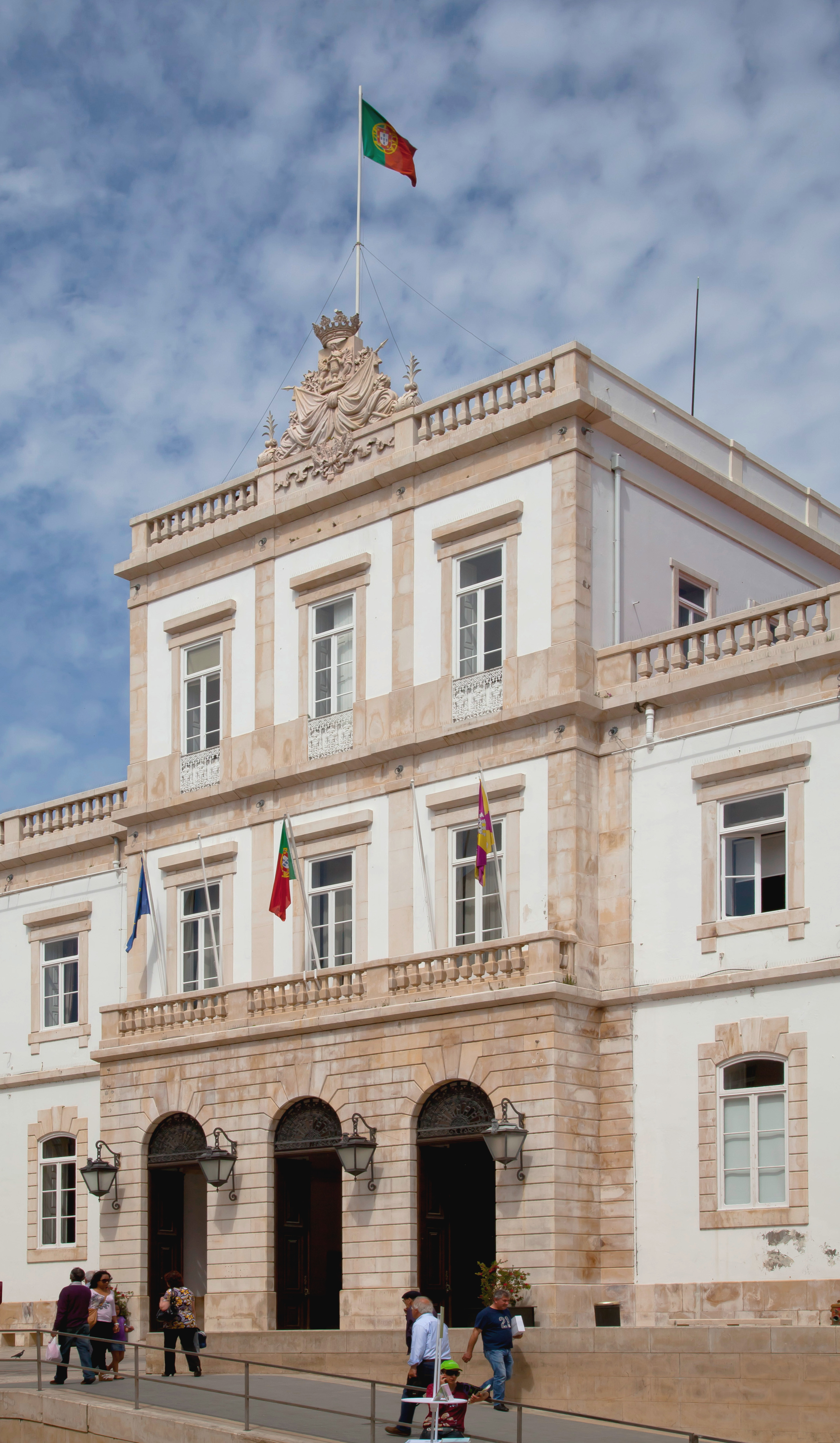
Coimbra city hall, 2012

The following is a list of presidents of the Câmara Municipal de Coimbra (city council), of Coimbra, Portugal.

- Agostinho José Pinto de Almeida, ca. 1834
- José António Rodrigues Trovão, ca. 1834–1835
- Francisco Maria Tavares de Carvalho, ca. 1835–1836
- Joaquim António da Silva, ca. 1836–1837
- José Machado de Abreu, ca. 1837
- António Inácio de Abreu, ca. 1837
- Agostinho José Pinto de Almeida, ca. 1838
- Jerónimo José de Melo, ca. 1839
- Frederico de Azevedo Faro e Noronha, ca. 1840–1841
- António Manuel Pereira, ca. 1841–1842
- José Machado de Abreu, ca. 1843–1844
- Joaquim Inácio Roxanes, ca. 1845–1846
- Joaquim de Castro Henriques, ca. 1846
- Francisco Fernandes da Costa, ca. 1846
- Manuel Marques de Figueiredo, ca. 1847
- António José Cardoso Guimarães, ca. 1847–1851
- Cesário Augusto de Azevedo Pereira, ca. 1852–1855
- António Augusto da Costa Simões, ca. 1856–1857
- Raimundo Venâncio Rodrigues, ca. 1858–1862
- Francisco Fernandes da Costa, ca. 1862
- António Luís de Sousa Henriques Seco, ca. 1863
- D. José Maria de Vasconcelos Azevedo Silva e Carvajal, Visconde Das Canas, ca. 1864–1865
- Manuel Dos Santos Pereira Jardim, Visconde de Montessão, ca. 1866–1867
- Raimundo Venâncio Rodrigues, ca. 1868–1869
- Joaquim Augusto das Neves Barateiro, ca. 1870–1871
- Lourenço de Almeida Azevedo, ca. 1872–1873
- Fernando Augusto de Andrade Pimentel e Melo, ca. 1874–1875
- Lourenço de Almeida Azevedo, ca. 1876–1885
- João José Dantas Souto Rodrigues, ca. 1886
- Luís da Costa e Almeida, ca. 1887
- Manuel da Costa Alemão, ca. 1890–1892
- João Maria Correia Aires de Campos, ca. 1893–1895
- Luís Pereira da Costa, ca. 1896–1898
- Manuel Dias da Silva, ca. 1899–1904
- José Ferreira Marnoco e Sousa, ca. 1905–1907, 1908
- João Rodrigues Donato, ca. 1908
- Sidónio Bernardino Cardoso da Silva Pais, ca. 1910
- António Augusto Gonçalves, ca. 1911–1913
- José Falcão Ribeiro, ca. 1913
- Francisco Vilaça da Fonseca, ca. 1914–1917
- Eusébio Tamagníni de Matos Encarnação, ca. 1918
- Augusto Joaquim Alves dos Santos, ca. 1919
- Fernando Baeta Bissaya-Barreto Rosa, ca. 1923
- Mário Augusto de Almeida, ca. 1926–1928
- Abel Augusto Dias Urbano, ca. 1928
- João Dos Santos Jacob, ca. 1929–1931
- Afonso José Maldonado, ca. 1931
- Manuel Serras Pereira, ca. 1934
- Luís Wittnich Carrisso, ca. 1935
- Ferrand Pimentel de Almeida, ca. 1935–1941
- Alberto de Sá Oliveira, ca. 1942–1951
- José Maria Correia Cardoso, ca. 1951–1957
- Joaquim de Moura Relvas, ca. 1957–1966
- Júlio de Araújo Vieira, ca. 1966–1974
- Rui Braga Carrington da Costa, ca. 1974–1976
- Maria Judite Mendes de Abreu, ca. 1976–1979
- António Monteiro Dos Santos Moreira, ca. 1980–1983
- Fernando Luís Mendes Silva, ca. 1983–1986
- António Monteiro dos Santos Moreira, ca. 1986–1990
- Manuel Augusto Soares Machado, ca. 1990–2002, 2013–2021^{(pt)}
- Carlos Manuel de Sousa Encarnação, ca.2002–2010
- João Paulo Barbosa de Melo, ca. 2010–2013
- José Manuel Silva, ca. 2021–2025
- Ana Abrunhosa, ca. 2025–present

== See also ==
- Coimbra history and timeline
- List of alcaldes of Coimbra (municipal magistrates)
- List of bishops of Coimbra

== Bibliography ==
- Relatorio da gerencia municipal de Coimbra (in Portuguese) circa 1860s
  - Relatorio sobre as contas da gerencia municipal de Coimbra (in Portuguese) circa 1900s
- Indice chronologico dos pergaminhos e foraes existentes no Archivo da Camara Municipal de Coimbra (in Portuguese) (2nd ed.). 1875.
- José Pinto Loureiro (1957). "Presidentes da Câmara Municipal de Coimbra". Arquivo Coimbrão (in Portuguese). 15.
- "História dos Paços do Concelho", Cm-coimbra.pt (in Portuguese), Câmara Municipal de Coimbra, 2007
