= St. Peter's Basilica, Guimarães =

Coordinates: 41.4417°N 8.2959°W

Saint Peter's Basilica
- Basílica de São Pedro
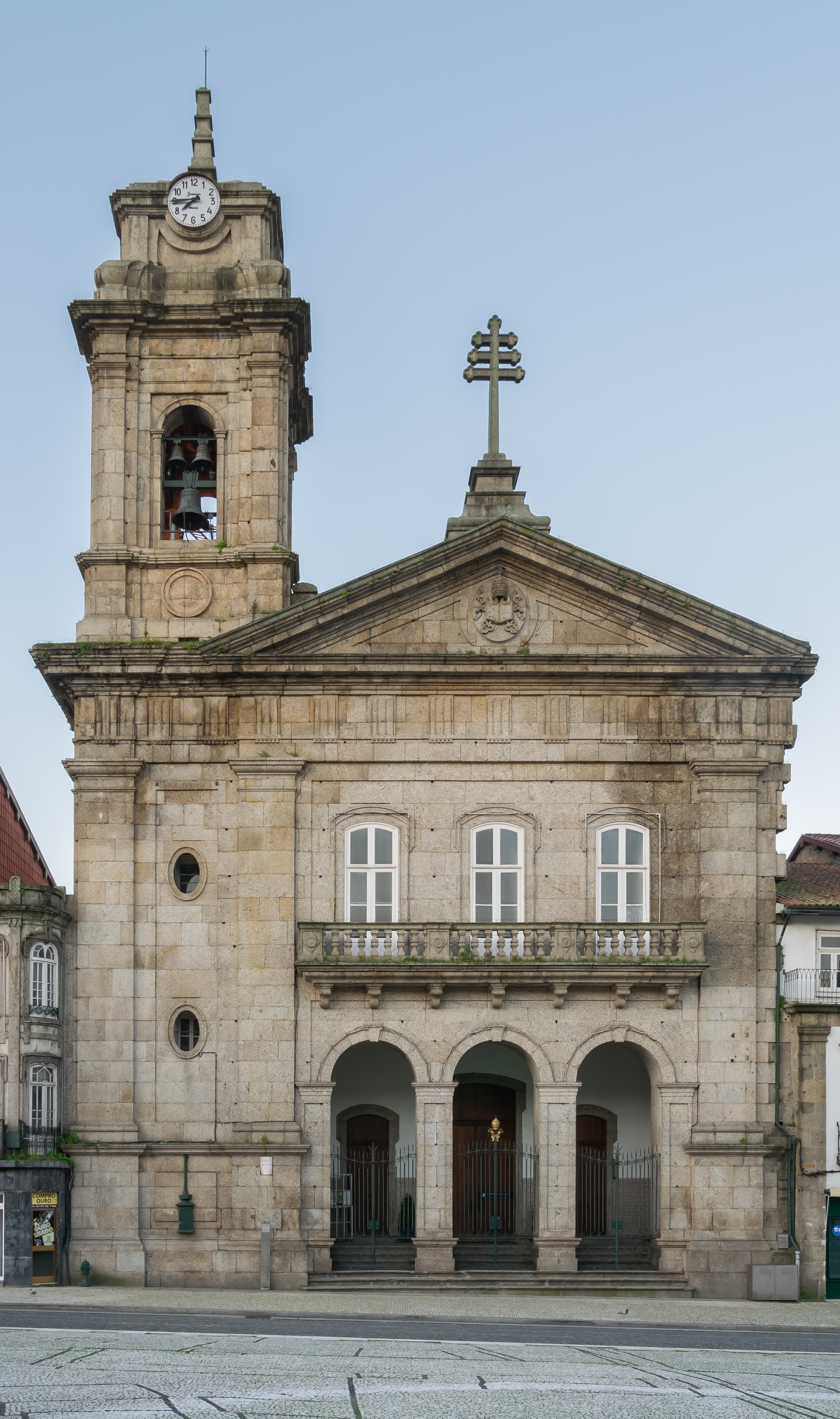
- Saint Peter's Basilica
- Location: Toural, Guimarães
- Country: Portugal
- Denomination: Roman Catholic Church

History
- Status: Inserted in the GHC

Architecture
- Architectural type: Neoclassical

Administration
- Archdiocese: Roman Catholic Archdiocese of Braga

The Saint Peter's Basilica (Portuguese: Basílica de São Pedro) is a Catholic basilica built in neoclassical style at the Toural Square, inserted in the freguesia of Oliveira, São Paio e São Sebastião, part of Guimarães, in northwest Portugal.

Its origin dates back to the beginning of the 17th century, although the work only began in 1737. By 1750 the chapel was blessed. The formal completion of the work was between 1883 and 1884, although the façade had not been completed, and the second bell tower was never actually built.

The church was desecrated during the Napoleonic Wars and was used as a stable. It received the title of minor basilica in 1751 from Pope Benedict XIV. The basilica follows a neoclassical style, very austere and simple.

On 1 December 1942, after the "Missa das Almas", a few hundred poor people gathered in the top floor of the basilica to receive free soup and bread, but the weight of the same was too much, leading to the collapse of the floor and the death of 10 people and the injuring of many more.

== See also ==
- Guimarães
- Toural
- Basilicas in Europe
- Roman Catholicism in Portugal
- St. Peter's Basilica

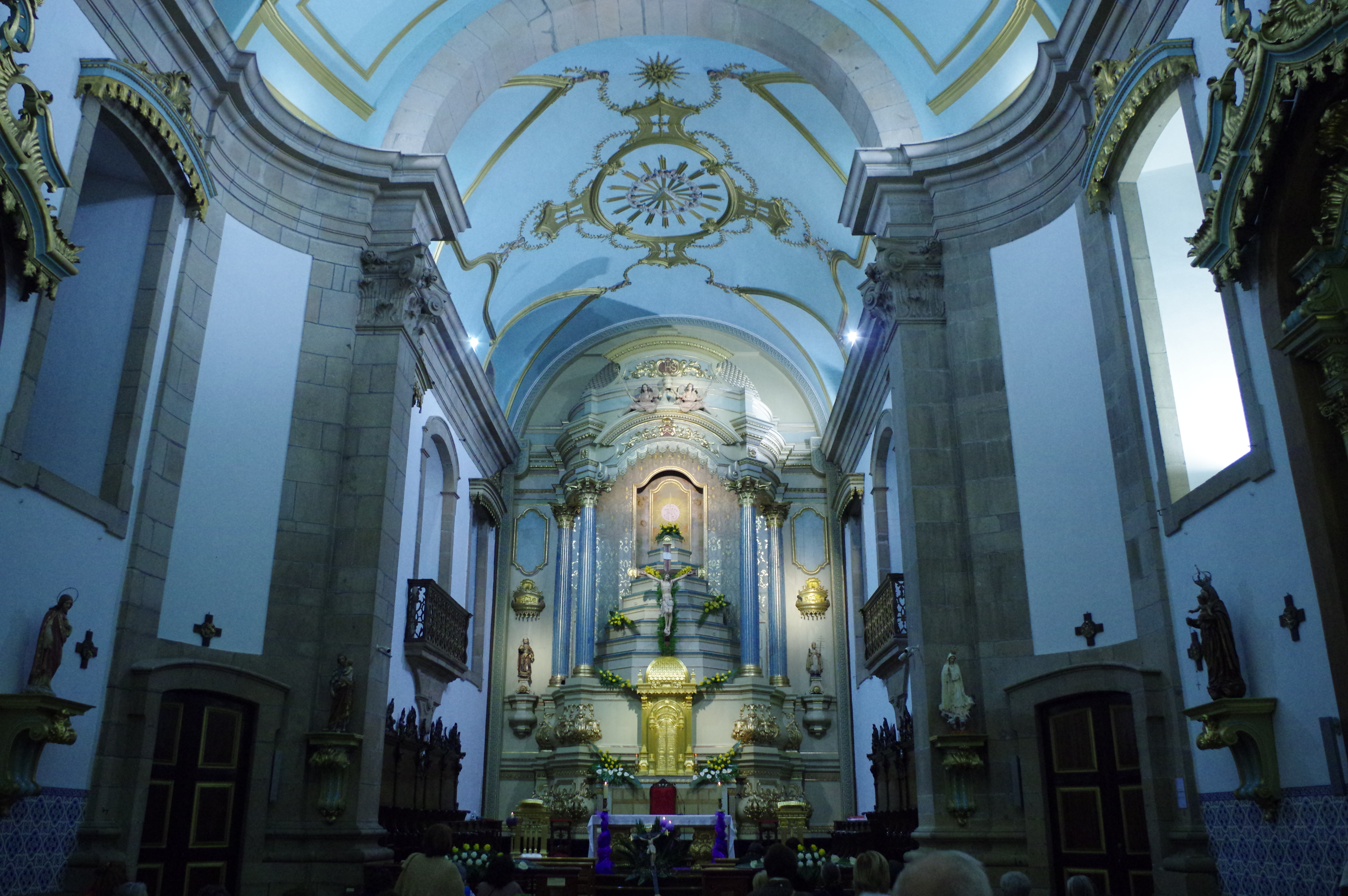
Internal view
