= André de Freitas =

Portuguese stand-up comedian (born 1994)

André De Freitas
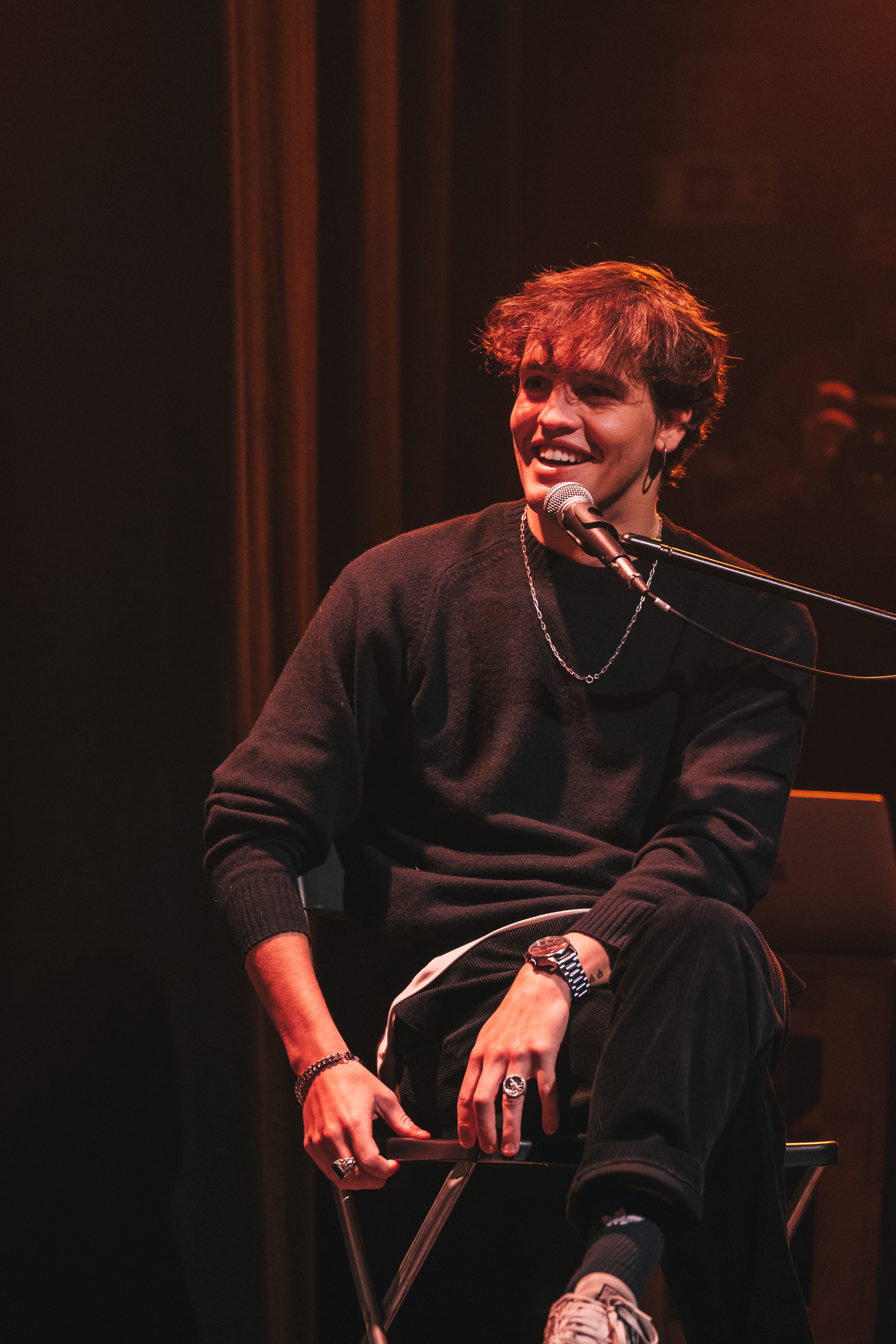
- Born: 9 September 1994 (age 32); Guimarães

Comedy career
- Years active: 2016–present
- Medium: Stand-up; film
- Genres: Observational comedy; Story telling; Self-referential humor
- Subject: Cultural Exploration • Observational Comedy • Globalism
- Website: https://www.theandredefreitas.com/

André Henriques de Freitas Gonçalves (born 9 September 1994), professionally known as André De Freitas, is a stand-up comedian.

== Career ==
André began his stand-up comedy career in 2015, performing at local clubs and bars in Lisbon. In 2016, after a trip to the United States, he decided to pursue an international career in comedy. Shortly thereafter André moved to London.

André has performed at various comedy festivals including the Edinburgh Fringe Festival where he was named one of Entertainment Now's Top Newcomers, the Adelaide Fringe Festival, and the Melbourne International Comedy Festival where he won The Comic's Lounge's "Best New International Act". He also performed at The Comedy Store in California.

His debut show "What If" received positive reviews. The show was noted for its humorous exploration of life's uncertainties and received a series of 4 and 5-star reviews from a series of publications including The Sunday Express and The Telegraph, where he made their list of "Funniest Jokes of the 2023 Fringe".

In June 2025, De Freitas released this show as his first full-length stand-up comedy special, What If, which was filmed in London and premiered on YouTube on June 27, 2025.

In January 2026, De Freitas became a regular performer at the Comedy Cellar in New York City, becoming the first Portuguese comedian to achieve regular status at the venue.

In October 2026, De Freitas was named one of New York’s Funniest Stand-Ups, a curated showcase presented by the New York Comedy Festival, featuring a selection of emerging comedians from New York City’s comedy scene.

== Notable works ==
André co-wrote and participated in 4-part tutorial series with Oracle Red Bull Racing driver Sergio "Checo" Pérez and Formula 1 World Champion Max Verstappen for crypto marketplace Bybit.

André De Freitas also created and co-starred in Comedy Therapy - a live format show that brings comedy and mental health together.

André de Freitas was part of the BBC World Service Arts Hour Comedy Special of 2024.

== Awards and recognition ==
Year	Organization	Award
2023	(ISH) Edinburgh Awards	Best Newcomer (Nominated)
2023	Melbourne Comedy Festival	Comic's Lounge Best New International Act (Winner)
2026	New York Comedy Festival	New York’s Funniest Stand-Ups (Selected)

== Personal life ==
André De Freitas is based in New York City. He is fluent in English and Portuguese and also speaks Spanish.
