= Setúbal Aqueduct =

15th-century aqueduct in Setúbal, Portugal

- Aqueduto de Setúbal
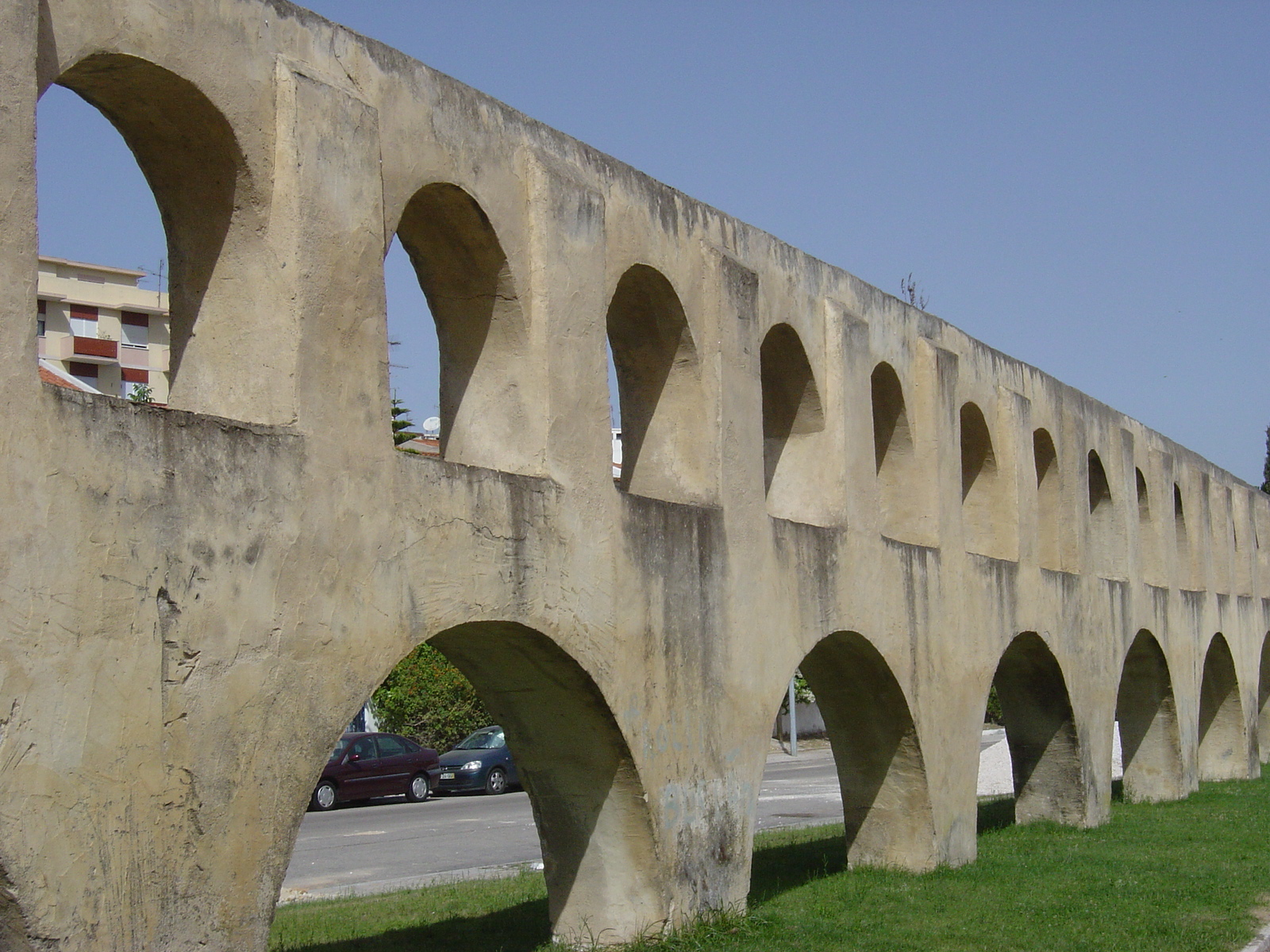
- Interactive map of the Setúbal Aqueduct area

General information
- Type: Aqueduct
- Location: Setúbal, Portugal

The Setúbal Aqueduct (Portuguese: Aqueduto de Setúbal) is a 15th-century aqueduct that spans the Portuguese city of Setúbal.

== History ==
Built at the end of the 15th century, during the reign of King John II, it extended for several kilometers, from the source, to the city walls. In 1693, the Chafariz do Sapal was built in front of the Paços do Concelho de Setúbal building. However, the city's water supply is no longer dependent on this aqueduct. The urban expansion of the city reduced the traces of the aqueduct to some sections, one of which is located in the center of the city, on the site of the old soccer field of Vitória, on Estrada dos Arcos.

The aqueduct was declared a Property of Public Interest by Decree No. 516/71, of 22 November 1971.
