= Toural =

Main town square of Guimarães, Portugal

- Largo do Toural
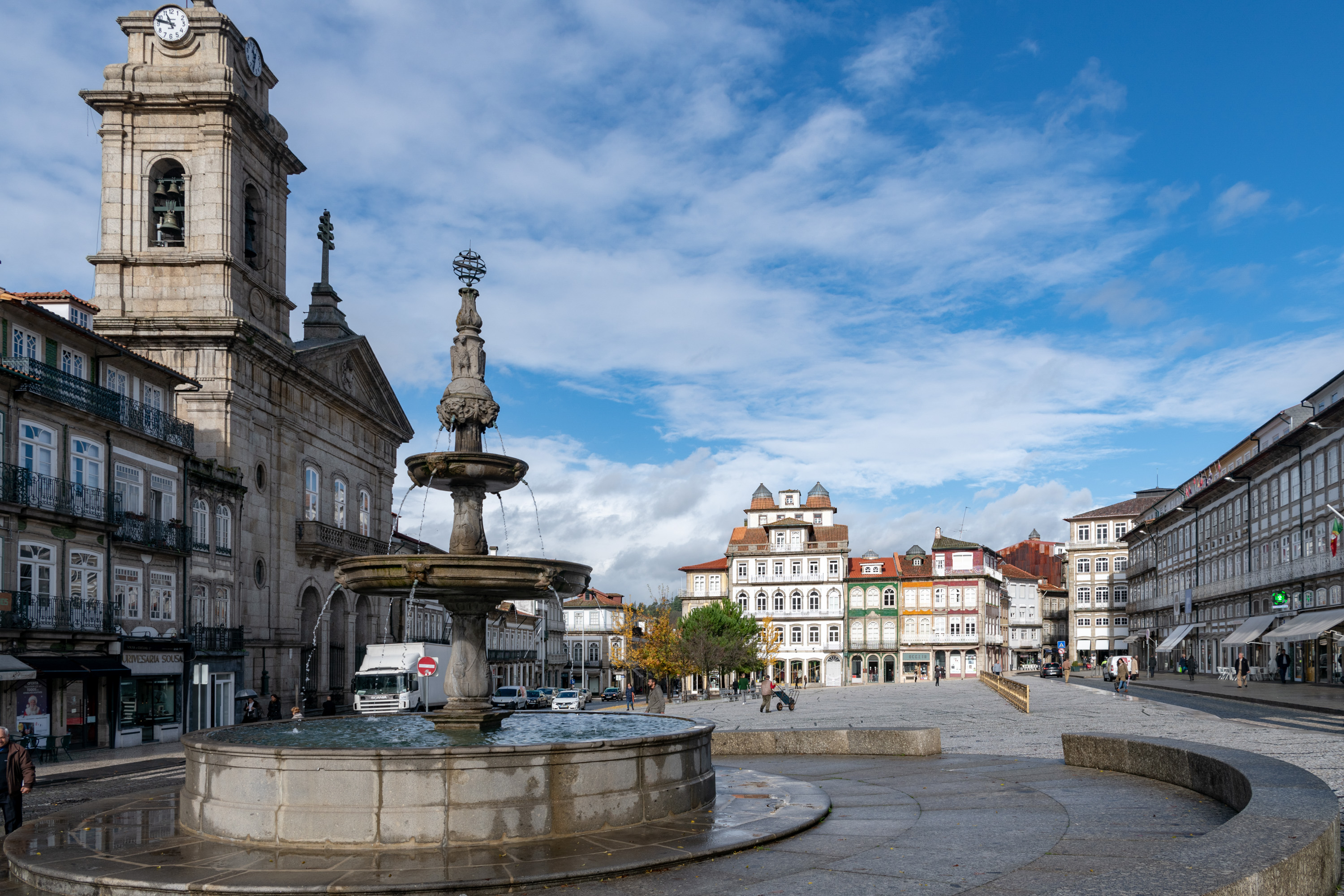
- The Toural Square
- Interactive map of Toural
- Location: Guimarães, Portugal
- Coordinates: 41.44191°N 8.29562°W
- Completion date: 17th century
- Restored date: 1878, 2012

The Toural Square (Portuguese: Largo do Toural), commonly referred as just Toural, is the most important square and place of gathering on the Portuguese city of Guimarães. It began in the 17th century as a place to sell bulls (Touro in Portuguese), oxen and other goods. Unlike the rest of the city, pigeons aren’t commonly found in the Toural, but swallows are.

== History ==
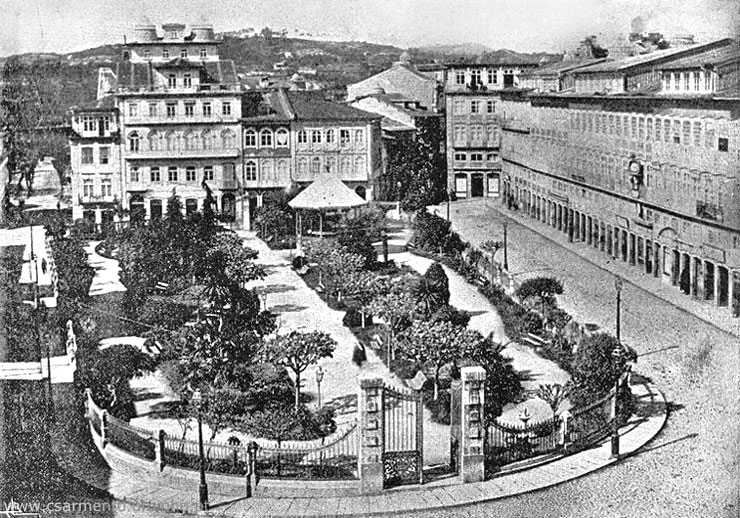
The Toural Square in 1884

Considered the heart of the city nowadays, in the 17th century it was a square outside the main gate of the city, where cattle fairs and other fairs selling various products were held.

In the 18th century, at the behest of Queen Maria I, the old medieval wall was demolished (all that is left of that section is the Alfândega Tower but other parts of the wall are still standing) and houses following the Pombaline style were built on that site.

In 1791, the Town Hall granted the land next to the wall for the construction of buildings, which were later built according to a new type of plan that had possibly come from Lisbon following the 1755 earthquake, thus determining the beginning of the slow transformation of the Toural. In the second half of the century, a public garden was built, surrounded by iron railing and stone walls, which opened in 1878.

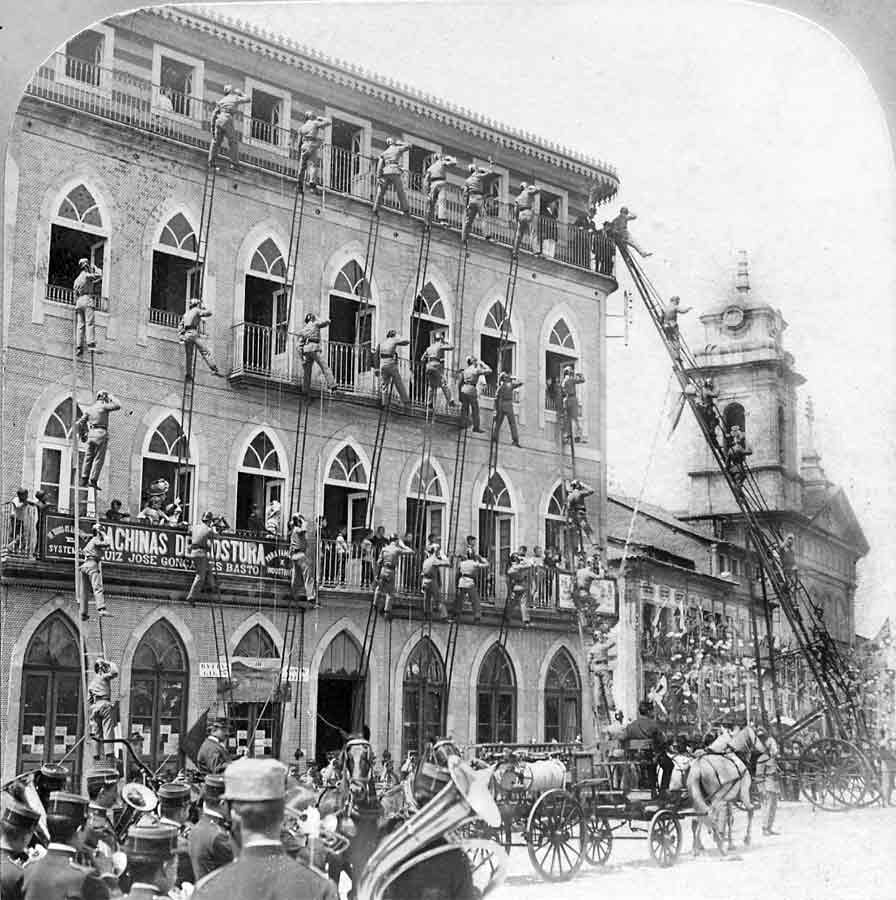
Fireman performing a drill in a building that is now the Caixa Geral de Depósitos, 1908

Urban furniture was created for this space in keeping with the new iron architecture: a bandstand, urinal, benches and lamps. With the establishment of the Republic, the public garden was destroyed and transferred to another location, and a statue of King Afonso Henriques was put in its place, the centre of the Toural, that is now refurbished. A few years later it was moved to Parque do Castelo (Castle's Park) and replaced by a beautiful artistic fountain.

It underwent changes between 2010 and 2012 that were very controversial amongst the inhabitants of Guimarães.

== St. Peter's Basilica ==
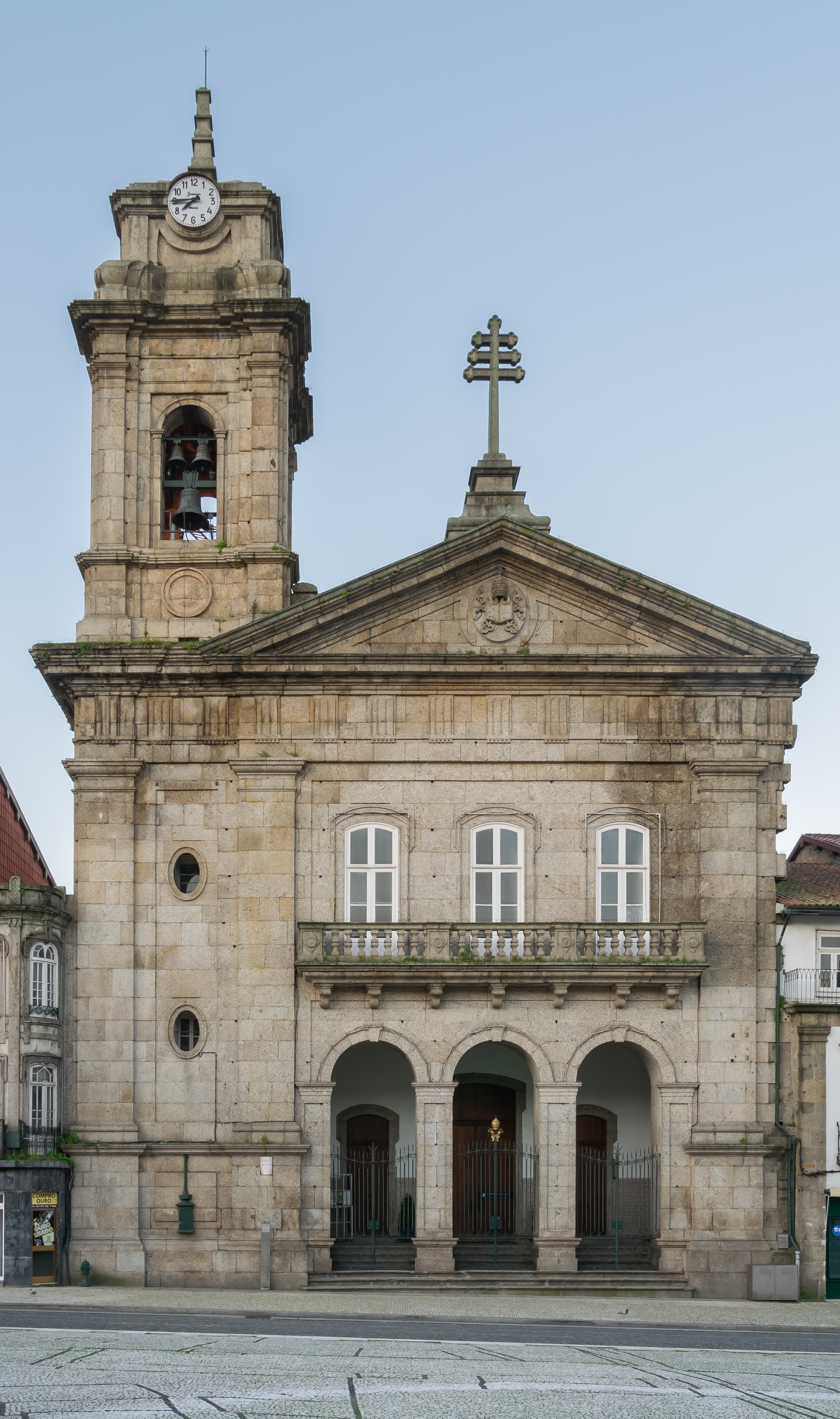
St. Peter's Basilica

On the west side of Largo do Toural stands the St. Peter's Basilica. This church has a simple and elementary architecture of neoclassical style. In 1750 it was blessed and housed the image of its patron saint, Peter.

In 1751, by indult of the Holy See, the church was given the title of Basilica by Pope Benedict XIV. It was the first church to receive this honour in the Roman Catholic Archdiocese of Braga.

The chancel is separated from the nave by a round-arched crossing arch and the altarpiece stands out in its blue and gold carving, still a manifestation of the eclectic taste of the late 19th century.

In 1881 it underwent remodelling work, with the demolition of the temporary structures and the houses that stood in front of the body of the church. The work ended at the beginning of the 20th century, with only one of the two planned towers actually being built.

== Other Points of Interest ==
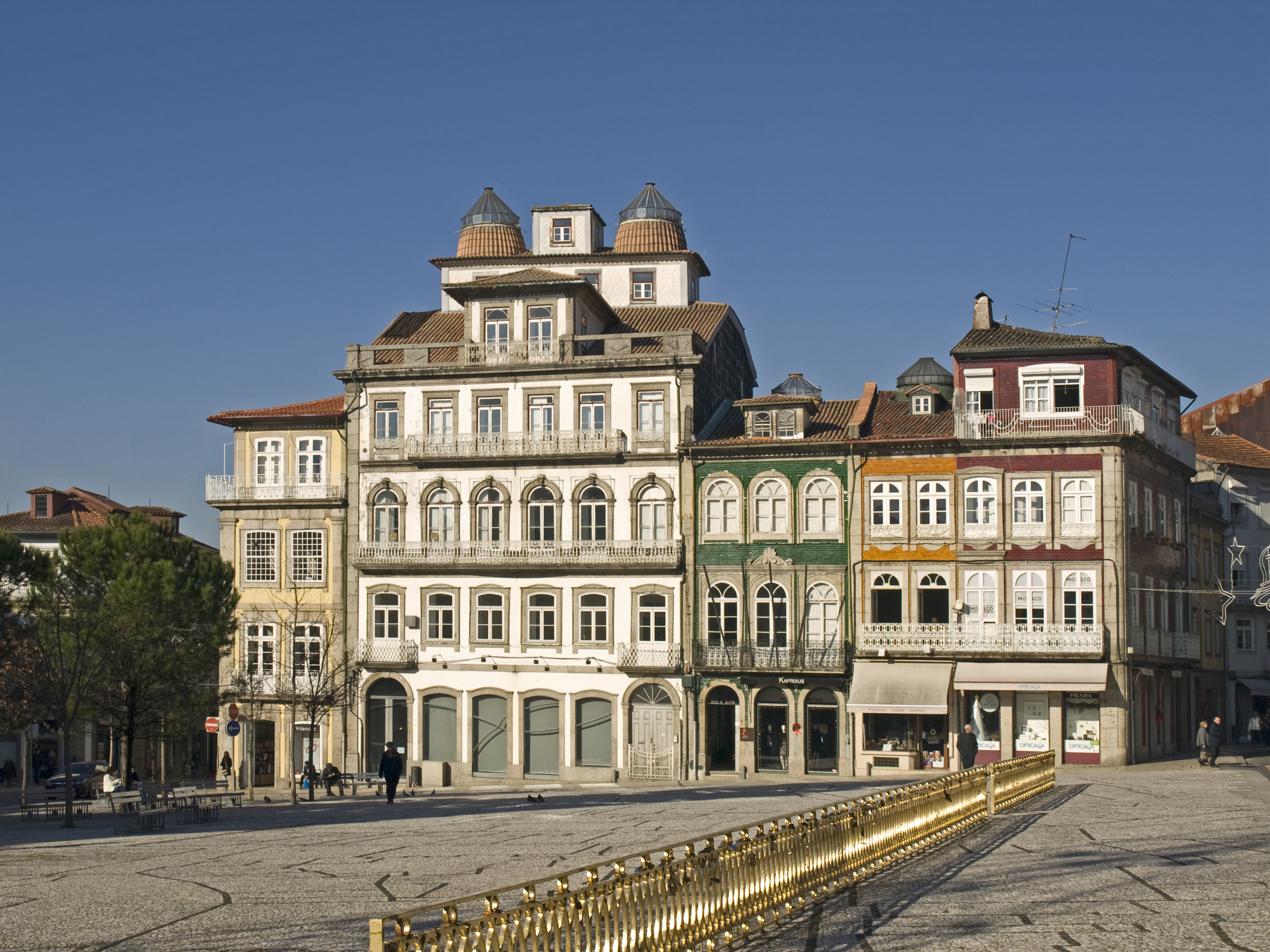
Photo of the Da Vinci Building (the tallest one) and other pombaline buildings

The Toural Square includes many Points of Interest these might include:

- Da Vinci Building
- Milenário Café
- Alfândega Tower
- Toural fountain
- Fidalgo do Toural's House
- Martins Sarmento Society Building

== See also ==
- Guimarães
- Castle of Guimarães
- Nicolinas
