= List of archives in Portugal =

Arquivo Distrital, Braga

This is a list of archives in Portugal.

== Archives in Portugal ==
=== District archives ===
- Arquivo Distrital de Braga (est. 1917), Braga District
- Arquivo Distrital de Aveiro, Aveiro District
- Arquivo Distrital de Beja
- Arquivo Distrital de Bragança
- Arquivo Distrital de Castelo Branco
- Arquivo Distrital de Évora
- Arquivo Distrital de Faro
- Arquivo Distrital da Guarda
- Arquivo Distrital de Leiria
- Arquivo Distrital de Lisboa (abolished in 2012; materials transferred to the Torre do Tombo National Archive)
- Arquivo Distrital de Portalegre
- Arquivo Distrital do Porto (est. 1931)
- Arquivo Distrital de Santarém
- Arquivo Distrital de Setúbal
- Arquivo Distrital de Viana do Castelo
- Arquivo Distrital de Vila Real
- Arquivo Distrital de Viseu

=== Municipal archives ===
==== Alentejo Region ====
- Arquivo Municipal de Beja
- Arquivo Municipal de Estremoz
- Arquivo Municipal de Mértola
- Arquivo Municipal de Moura
- Arquivo Municipal de Reguengos de Monsaraz

==== Algarve Region ====
- Arquivo Histórico Municipal de Albufeira
- Arquivo Municipal de Lagoa
- Arquivo Municipal de Loulé
- Arquivo Municipal de Olhão
- Arquivo Municipal de Silves
- Arquivo Municipal de Tavira
- Arquivo Municipal de Vila do Bispo
- Arquivo Municipal de Vila Real de Santo António

==== Centro Region ====
- Arquivo Municipal de Benavente
- Arquivo Municipal de Constância
- Arquivo Municipal de Estarreja
- Arquivo Municipal de Ferreira do Zêzere
- Centro de Documentação de Ílhavo - Arquivo Municipal
- Arquivo Municipal de Lourinhã
- Arquivo Municipal da Mealhada
- Arquivo Municipal da Murtosa
- Arquivo Municipal de Ovar
- Arquivo Municipal de São Pedro do Sul
- Arquivo Municipal de Torres Novas
- Arquivo Municipal de Torres Vedras

==== Lisboa Region ====
- Arquivo Municipal de Vila Franca de Xira
- Arquivo Histórico Municipal de Cascais, Cascais

==== Norte Region ====
- Arquivo Municipal de Arcos de Valdevez
- Arquivo Municipal de Arouca
- Arquivo Municipal de Caminha
- Arquivo Municipal de Melgaço
- Arquivo Municipal de Monção
- Arquivo Municipal de Oliveira de Azeméis
- Arquivo Municipal de Paredes de Coura
- Arquivo Municipal de Ponte da Barca
- Arquivo Municipal de Ponte de Lima
- Arquivo Municipal de Santa Maria da Feira
- Arquivo Municipal de Vale de Cambra
- Arquivo Municipal de Valença
- Arquivo Municipal de Viana do Castelo
- Arquivo Municipal de Vila Nova de Cerveira
- Arquivo Municipal de Vila Verde

=== National archives ===
- Torre do Tombo National Archive
- Arquivo Central da Marinha, Comissão Cultural da Marinha, Portuguese Navy, Lisbon
- Arquivo Histórico Diplomatico of the Ministry of Foreign Affairs (Portugal) Instituto Diplomático
- Arquivo Histórico Militar, Lisbon
- Arquivo Historico Parlamentar, Lisbon
- Arquivo Histórico Ultramarino
- Biblioteca e Arquivo Histórico do Ministério das Obras Públicas, Transportes, e Comunicaçôes (Ministry of Planning and Infrastructure)
- Biblioteca Nacional de Portugal (National Library)
- Cinemateca Portuguesa
- National Archive for Portugal’s Directorate General of Cultural Heritage (SIPA)

=== Other ===
There are many other archives in Portugal, such as:

- Fundação Mário Soares Arquivo & Biblioteca, Lisbon (related to 20th c. politician Mário Soares)
- Arquivo dos Açores
- Arquivo Regional e Biblioteca Pública da Madeira
- Biblioteca Pública e Arquivo Regional Luís da Silva Ribeiro
- Centro de documentação 25 de Abril, University of Coimbra
- Centro de Documentação Bissaya Barreto, Coimbra

== See also ==
- Archivo.pt (digital archive of the World Wide Web)
- List of public archives in Portugal (pt)
- List of libraries in Portugal
- List of museums in Portugal
- Culture of Portugal
- Archives Portal Europe
- Open access in Portugal

== Bibliography ==
in English

- Crump, Charles George (1911). "Record" . In Chisholm, Hugh (ed.). Encyclopædia Britannica. Vol. 22 (11th ed.). Cambridge University Press. pp. 958–966, see page 964. "Portugal.—Portuguese royal records are in the monastery of Sao Bento at Lisbon....It includes the registers of the Chancery since the 13th century, and a large number of documents subsidiary to them. In addition to this repository there are collections at the various ministries; from the records of the Ministry for Foreign Affairs, Borges de Castro, and afterwards Judice Biker, published their Collecção dos Tratados . . . entre a Corona de Portugal e as mais potentias. There are three volumes of transcripts from Portuguese records in the English Public Record Office."
- Bailey Wallys Diffie (1953), Bibliography of the principal published guides to Portuguese archives and libraries
- A. F. C. Ryder (1965). Materials for West African history in Portuguese archives. Athlone Press. OCLC 340165.
- Ann Pescatello (1970). "Relatorio from Portugal: The Archives and Libraries of Portugal and Their Significance for the Study of Brazilian History". Latin American Research Review. 5. JSTOR 2502224.
- Lawrence J. McCrank, ed. (1993). Discovery in the archives of Spain and Portugal : quincentenary essays, 1492-1992. New York: Haworth Press. ISBN 156024643X.
  - Timothy J. Coates (1993). "Sources in Portuguese and Goan (India) Archives and Libraries (1500-1755): A Guide and Commentary". Primary Sources & Original Works. 2 (3-4: Access and Research in Iberian Archives). doi:10.1300/J269v02n03_01.
- Daniela Kirchner, ed. (1995). "Portugal". Film and Television Collections in Europe: the MAP-TV Guide. EU MEDIA Programme and Routledge. pp. 407–425. ISBN 978-1-135-37262-0.
- Paul Bjerk (2004). "African Files in Portuguese Archives". History in Africa. 31. doi:10.1017/S0361541300003624.

in Portuguese

- Anais das bibliotecas e arquivos [Annals of Libraries and Archives] (in Portuguese), Biblioteca Nacional de Lisboa, OCLC 49996453 – via Biblioteca Nacional Digital 1914-
