= List of cities in Portugal =

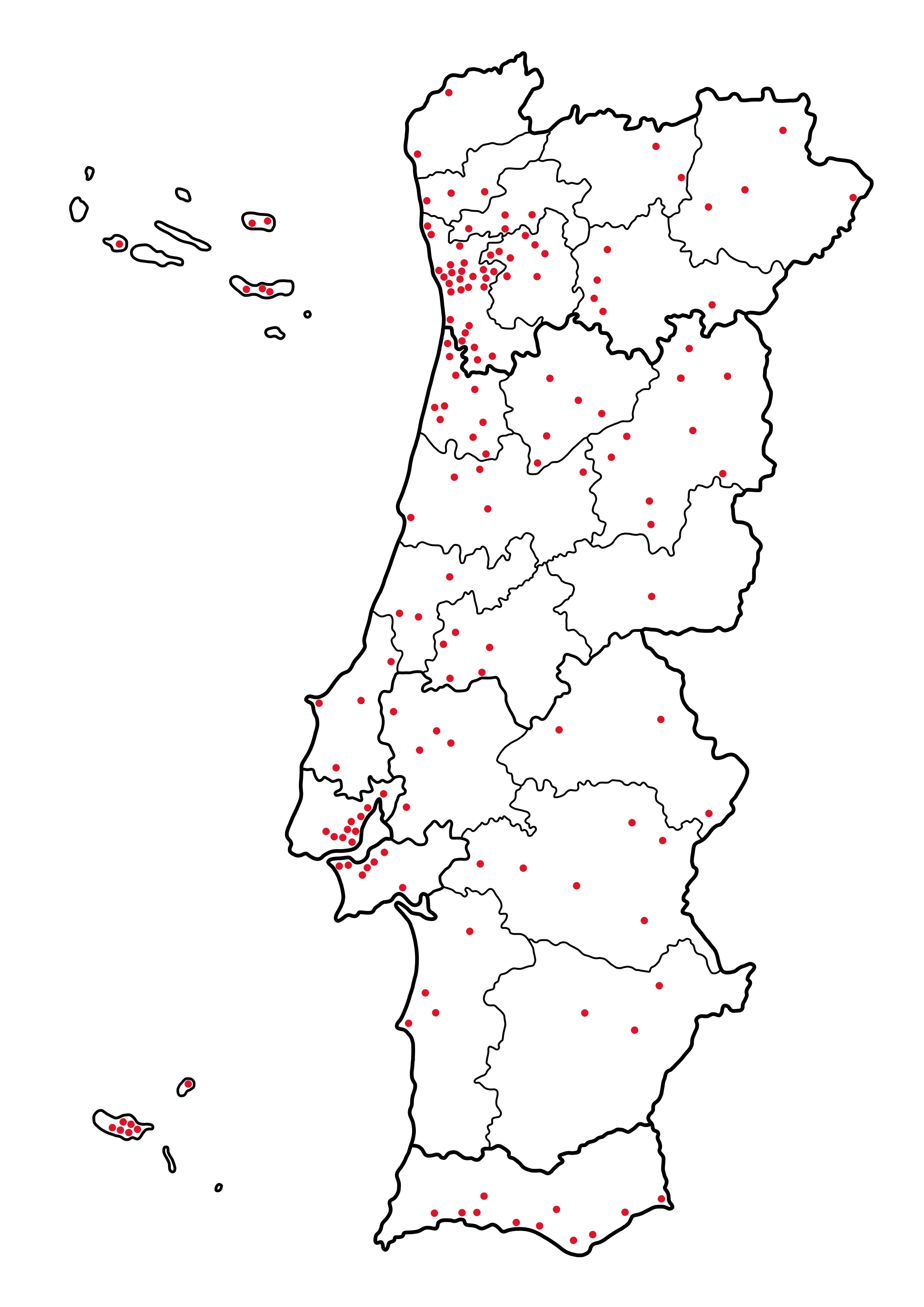
Map of the cities of Portugal

This is a list of cities in Portugal. In Portugal, a city (Portuguese: cidade) is an honorific term given to localities that meet several criteria, such as having a minimum number of inhabitants, good infrastructure (schools, medical care, cultural and sports facilities), or major historical importance. The country's demographic expansion in the aftermath of the Carnation Revolution, which brought an end to the Portuguese Colonial War and the arrival of over 500,000 retornados from Portugal's former colonies in Africa, prompted the elevation of several towns to city status. As of 2026, 160 localities in Portugal are considered a city.

== Overview ==
In Portugal, the city is not an administrative division, therefore a city generally does not necessarily correspond to a municipality, which is the second-level local government in the country. Some entirely urban municipalities do coincide with cities, such as Lisbon, Porto, Funchal, Amadora, Entroncamento, and São João da Madeira. Conversely, a municipality can contain multiple cities; the municipality of Paredes contains four cities, the most of any municipality in the country.

Until 1910, a locality was proclaimed a city by royal charter (carta régia), which happened 25 times to current Portuguese cities (royal charters were also granted to cities of the Portuguese Empire; for example, São Paulo in 1711). During the Portuguese First Republic, the process was transferred to the parliament, which elevated three towns to the category of city. The dictatorial Estado Novo regime proclaimed seven cities on the Portuguese mainland (as well as some more in the colonies), this time by government decree. After the 1974 Carnation Revolution, proclamation of cities returned to parliament, and 159 localities in the country are considered a city as of 2023.

The designation of eight settlements as cities predates the formation of the Kingdom of Portugal in the 12th century: Braga, Coimbra, Lamego, Porto and Viseu, as well as Évora, Lisbon and Silves, which were annexed to the kingdom in the century after its founding. Guarda was the first city proclaimed as part of the independent kingdom, in 1199.

== City designation ==
In Portugal, a locality can only be called a city if more than 8,000 inhabitants live in the city's urban area. In addition, at least half of the following infrastructure must be present:

- Hospital
- Pharmacy
- Fire department
- Event center and cultural center
- Museum and library
- Hotel
- Primary and secondary school
- Pre-school and kindergarten
- Public transportation
- Garden or public park

=== Cities being towns ===
In Portugal there are localities with more than 8,000 inhabitants and with the required infrastructure installed, but not having the designation of "city", but rather as "town", for example:

- Algueirão-Mem Martins
- Cascais
- Corroios
- Ponte de Lima
- Rio de Mouro
- Sintra

=== Towns being cities ===
Just as there are "cities" being "towns", there are also "towns" being "cities", because they have the required infrastructure in place, but have no more than 8,000 inhabitants or because since the locality received the designation "city" it has lost over the years the 8,000 inhabitants, for example:

- Miranda do Douro
- Santana
- Sabugal
- Reguengos de Monsaraz

== Metropolitan areas ==
Portugal's two metropolitan areas, Lisbon with over 2.8 million inhabitants and Porto with over 1.7 million inhabitants, are the largest agglomerations in the country. In the two metropolitan areas, in addition to the large cities of Lisbon and Porto, there are other cities that together form the metropolitan area.

The Lisbon Metropolitan Area consists of the large city of Lisbon, but also the cities of Amadora, Queluz, Agualva-Cacém, etc.

The Porto Metropolitan Area is made up of the large city of Porto, but also the cities of Vila Nova de Gaia, Gondomar, Rio Tinto, Póvoa de Varzim, Matosinhos, etc.

== Large cities outside metropolitan areas ==
There are also large cities in Portugal that do not belong to any metropolitan area. These cities are mostly capitals of sub-regions that are not considered metropolitan areas because the population is mainly located in the capital of the sub-region.

The city of Braga is the capital of the sub-region of Cávado. (193.324 hab.)

The city of Guimarães is the capital of the sub-region of Ave. (156.830 hab.)

The city of Coimbra is the capital of the sub-region Região de Coimbra. (140.816 hab.)

The city of Funchal is the capital of the autonomous region of Madeira. (105.795 hab.)

The city of Viseu is the capital of the sub-region of Dão-Lafões. (103.502 hab.)

== Urban areas ==
The following list shows the number of inhabitants and the population density of each respective city. Only the inhabitants living in the urban area are counted, not the inhabitants living in the entire municipality.

In the case of large cities like Braga, Coimbra, Setúbal and Guimarães, the inhabitants of the entire municipality are not listed, because the municipality does not only include the city, but also other towns and villages around the city, which nevertheless belong to the municipality, but form a separate parish and therefore do not belong to the respective city.

In the case of large cities like Lisbon, Porto, Amadora and Funchal, the inhabitants of the entire municipality are listed because the city spreads over the entire municipality and the respective parishes within the municipality are seen as "neighborhoods".

Cities with an italic font are capitals of subregions, cities with a bold font are capitals of regions.

Position	City	Municipality	Population		Area	Density per km^{2}	Sub-region	Region
Position	City	Municipality	2011	2021	Area	Density per km^{2}	Sub-region	Region
1.	Lisbon		552,700	545,796	100.05 km^{2}	5456.5	Greater Lisbon	
2.	Porto		237,591	231,800	41.42 km^{2}	5165.6	Porto Metropolitan Area	North
3.	Vila Nova de Gaia		186,502	188,421	56.22 km^{2}	3351.8	Porto Metropolitan Area	North
4.	Amadora		175,136	171,454	23.79 km^{2}	7195.4	Greater Lisbon	
5.	Braga		136,885	146,543	61.38 km^{2}	2351.9	Cávado	North
6.	Coimbra		105,842	106,655	94.65 km^{2}	1054.3	Region of Coimbra	Center
7.	Funchal		111,541	105,590	76.15 km^{2}	1389.2	Madeira	
8.	Setúbal		98,131	98,470	51.49 km^{2}	1755.6	Setúbal Peninsula	
9.	Almada		96,404	85,851	13.98 km^{2}	6309.1	Setúbal Peninsula	
10.	Agualva-Cacém	Sintra	79,805	81,006	10.42 km^{2}	7775.4	Greater Lisbon	
11.	Queluz	Sintra	75,169	73,047	29.49 km^{2}	3398.7	Greater Lisbon	
12.	Rio Tinto	Gondomar	64,815	65,469	15.04 km^{2}	4353.2	Porto Metropolitan Area	North
13.	Barreiro		63,353	62,860	14.92 km^{2}	4230.5	Setúbal Peninsula	
14.	Aveiro		60,058	62,130	81.19 km^{2}	716.1	Region of Aveiro	Center
15.	Viseu		57,975	60,570	64.85 km^{2}	917	Viseu Dão-Lafões	Center
16.	Odivelas		56,847	58,170	5.02 km^{2}	11873.3	Greater Lisbon	
17.	Guimarães		54,094	54,750	48.19 km^{2}	1136,1	Ave	North
18.	Leiria		50,533	54,540	108.05 km^{2}	633.1	Region of Leiria	Center
19.	Faro		47,575	49,360	74.75 km^{2}	619.5	Algarve	
20.	Matosinhos		49,486	49,034	11.28 km^{2}	4348.3	Porto Metropolitan Area	North
21.	Loures		43,127	46,246	32.82 km^{2}	434.4	Greater Lisbon	
22.	Portimão		40,658	43,810	75.69 km^{2}	650.8	Algarve	
23.	Póvoa de Varzim		40,053	41,206	29.24 km^{2}	1699.3	Porto Metropolitan Area	North
24.	Amora	Seixal	40,513	41,140	27.31 km^{2}	1807.1	Setúbal Peninsula	
25.	Maia		40,134	40,534	10.80 km^{2}	3753.2	Porto Metropolitan Area	North
26.	Évora		41,898	40,373	112.06 km^{2}	183.5	Central Alentejo	Alentejo
27.	Montijo		36,159	40,130	31.46 km^{2}	1316.3	Setúbal Peninsula	
28.	Ponta Delgada		40,661	40,050	23.41 km^{2}	1265.3	Azores	Azores
29.	Santa Maria da Feira		18,194	39,576	23.52 km^{2}	841.4	Porto Metropolitan Area	North
30.	Ermesinde	Valongo	38,869	38,570	7.65 km^{2}	5110.4	Porto Metropolitan Area	North
31.	Viana do Castelo		37,972	37,860	11.86 km^{2}	2121.2	High Minho	North
32.	Vila Nova de Famalicão		34,843	35,770	11.45 km^{2}	2028.8	Ave	North
33.	Castelo Branco		34,278	33,450	170.26 km^{2}	202.4	Low Beira	Center
34.	Covilhã		34,481	31,950	25.95 km^{2}	702.1	Beiras and Serra da Estrela	Center
35.	Alverca do Ribatejo	Vila Franca de Xira	30,586	30,930	23.92 km^{2}	1524.6	Greater Lisbon	
36.	Seixal		29,373	29,850	24.09 km^{2}	1893.1	Setúbal Península	
37.	Santarém		29,777	29,790	55.46 km^{2}	541.3	Lezíria do Tejo	Oeste e Vale do Tejo
38.	Figueira da Foz		30,012	29,690	33.26 km^{2}	933	Region of Coimbra	Center
39.	Vila do Conde		28,636	29,328	8.94 km^{2}	3545.7	Porto Metropolitan Area	North
40.	Póvoa de Santa Iria	Vila Franca de Xira	29,348	29,170	9.16 km^{2}	4462	Greater Lisbon	
41.	Olhão		28,630	28,310	9.43 km^{2}	1506.5	Algarve	
42.	Caldas da Rainha		27,652	27,790	59.20 km^{2}	514.2	West	Oeste e Vale do Tejo
43.	Vila Real		27,735	27,370	16.39 km^{2}	1471.1	Douro	North
44.	Santo Tirso		28,333	26,959	23.24 km^{2}	886.1	Porto Metropolitan Area	North
45.	Gondomar		27,047	26,669	47.40 km^{2}	1797.1	Porto Metropolitan Area	North
46.	Senhora da Hora	Matosinhos	27,747	26,088	3.80 km^{2}	5531.3	Porto Metropolitan Area	North
47.	Valongo		23,564	25,530	24.10 km^{2}	1073.9	Porto Metropolitan Area	North
48.	Guarda		25,993	25,182	37.66 km^{2}	702.2	Beiras and Serra da Estrela	Center
49.	Sacavém	Loures	24,822	24,672	3.89 km^{2}	6344.7	Greater Lisbon	
50.	Bragança		23,186	22,851	35.69 km^{2}	635.8	Lands of Trás-os-Montes	North
51.	São Mamede de Infesta	Matosinhos	23,122	22,844	5.21 km^{2}	5531.4	Porto Metropolitan Area	North
52.	Beja		23,254	22,260	73.77 km^{2}	325.9	Low Alentejo	Alentejo
53.	São João da Madeira		21,713	22,143	7.94 km^{2}	2788.9	Porto Metropolitan Area	North
54.	Albufeira		19,879	21,290	10.90 km^{2}	1953.0	Algarve	
55.	Chaves		22,363	21,210	33 km^{2}	521.4	High Tâmega	North
56.	Espinho		21,185	21,011	1.77 km^{2}	554.8	Porto Metropolitan Area	North
57.	Caniço	Santa Cruz	20,163	20,800	12 km^{2}	2004	Madeira	
58.	Barcelos		20,579	20,723	15.19 km^{2}	972.6	Cávado	North
59.	Paredes		19,834	20,586	21.51 km^{2}	957.2	Porto Metropolitan Area	North
60.	Entroncamento		20,206	20,141	13.73 km^{2}	1466.9	Medium Tejo	Oeste e Vale do Tejo
61.	Lagos		18,474	19,790	29.15 km^{2}	811.4	Algarve	
62.	Torres Vedras		17,837	19,680	62.44 km^{2}	444.9	West	Oeste e Vale do Tejo
63.	Quarteira	Loulé	15,618	17,500	38.16 km^{2}	639.9	Algarve	
64.	Abrantes		18,450	17,199	64.47 km^{2}	250.3	Medium Tejo	Oeste e Vale do Tejo
65.	Trofa		17,389	17,099	27.48 km^{2}	777.8	Porto Metropolitan Area	North
66.	Ovar		17,164	16,980	86.40 km^{2}	340.6	Region Aveiro	Center
67.	Vila Franca de Xira		16,129	16,270	212.86 km^{2}	86.1	Greater Lisbon	
68.	Fafe		15,703	15,455	7.97 km^{2}	1939.2	Ave	North
69.	Oliveira de Azeméis		15,071	15,449	25.95 km^{2}	796.6	Porto Metropolitan Area	North
70.	Felgueiras		16,094	14,927	17.44 km^{2}	1014.6	Tâmega and Sousa	North
71.	Loulé		14,900	14,890	108.90 km^{2}	227.1	Algarve	
72.	Paços de Ferreira		14,486	14,530	8.31 km^{2}	1614.6	Tâmega and Sousa	North
73.	Águeda		14,571	14,360	36.03 km^{2}	380.5	Region of Aveiro	Center
74.	Elvas		16,640	14,324	202.70 km^{2}	71.2	High Alentejo	Alentejo
75.	Câmara de Lobos		15,227	13,960	7.62 km^{2}	2172.7	Madeira	
76.	Portalegre		15,374	13,960	23.51 km^{2}	609	High Alentejo	Alentejo
77.	Tomar		15,065	13,882	30.38 km^{2}	557.3	Medium Tejo	Oeste e Vale do Tejo
78.	Valbom	Gondomar	14,407	13,803	4.39 km^{2}	3647.1	Porto Metropolitan Area	North
79.	Tavira		13,312	13,762	147.99 km^{2}	104.2	Algarve	
80.	Alfena	Valongo	14,397	13,670	15.70 km^{2}	919.6	Porto Metropolitan Area	North
81.	Peniche		14,822	13,302	8.34 km^{2}	1584.1	West	Oeste e Vale do Tejo
82.	Gafanha da Nazaré	Ílhavo	12,985	13,260	16.44 km^{2}	946	Region of Aveiro	Center
83.	Costa da Caparica	Almada	12,211	13,031	10.18 km^{2}	1372.4	Setúbal Peninsula	
84.	Ribeira Grande		12,663	12,590	66.55 km^{2}	193.3	Azores	
85.	Sines		12,463	12,338	5.40 km^{2}	2285.0	Alentejo Coast	Alentejo
86.	Torres Novas		12,941	12,330	61.64 km^{2}	261.3	Medium Tejo	Oeste e Vale do Tejo
87.	Amarante		12,660	12,120	15.21 km^{2}	760.3	Tâmega and Sousa	North
88.	Esmoriz	Ovar	11,448	11,922	9.05 km^{2}	1317.5	Region of Aveiro	Center
89.	Pombal		12,125	11,890	97.61 km^{2}	172.9	Region of Leiria	Center
90.	Samora Correia	Benavente	11,502	11,736	321.29 km^{2}	55.1	Lezíria do Tejo	Oeste e Vale do Tejo
91.	Almeirim		11,881	11,552	69.13 km^{2}	178.9	Lezíria do Tejo	Oeste e Vale do Tejo
92.	Vila Real de Santo António		11,360	11,180	61.25 km^{2}	191.9	Algarve	
93.	Lamego		11,194	11,078	20.20 km^{2}	597.6	Douro	North
94.	Vizela		10,633	11,072	7.68 km^{2}	1441.7	Ave	North
95.	Mirandela		11,579	10,911	29.78 km^{2}	382.9	Lands of Trás-os-Montes	North
96.	Marinha Grande		10,560	10,860	138.87 km^{2}	232.8	Region of Leiria	Center
97.	Esposende		9,844	10,824	17.31 km^{2}	708.6	Cávado	North
98.	Ílhavo		10,505	10,640	39 km^{2}	427.6	Region of Aveiro	Center
99.	Cartaxo		10,898	10,552	28.23 km^{2}	435.7	Lezíria do Tejo	Oeste e Vale do Tejo
100.	Penafiel		10,420	10,420	22.52 km^{2}	696.1	Tâmega and Sousa	North
101.	Marco de Canaveses		10,336	10,390	17.49 km^{2}	632.8	Tâmega and Sousa	North
102.	Fátima	Ourém	8,880	10,265	84.97 km^{2}	155.4	Medium Tejo	Oeste e Vale do Tejo
103.	Freamunde	Paços de Ferreira	10,443	10,180	4.68 km^{2}	1614.7	Tâmega and Sousa	North
104.	Machico		11,505	9,990	17.41 km^{2}	564.5	Madeira	
105.	Mangualde		10,407	9,858	46.25 km^{2}	213.1	Viseu Dão-Lafões	Center
106.	Lordelo	Paredes	10,025	9,106	9.25 km^{2}	984.5	Porto Metropolitan Area	North
107.	Vendas Novas		9,681	9,048	222.39 km^{2}	47.8	Central Alentejo	Alentejo
108.	Rio Maior		7,948	8,693	82.94 km^{2}	150.9	Lezíria do Tejo	Oeste e Vale do Tejo
109.	Albergaria-a-Velha		8,220	8,600	47 km^{2}	235.3	Region of Aveiro	Center
110.	Tondela		8,854	8,570	15.75 km^{2}	331.1	Viseu Dão-Lafões	Center
111.	Rebordosa	Paredes	9,106	8,496	11.17 km^{2}	760.6	Porto Metropolitan Area	North
112.	Vila Nova de Santo André	Santiago do Cacém	8,710	8,227	74.32 km^{2}	138.7	Alentejo Coast	Alentejo
113.	Lagoa		8,080	8,210	20.47 km^{2}	436.5	Azores	
114.	Peso da Régua		9,530	8,145	9.94 km^{2}	895.9	Douro	North
115.	Angra do Heroísmo		8,654	8,050	18.02 km^{2}	663.5	Azores	
116.	Lourosa	Santa Maria da Feira	8,636	8,003	5.77 km^{2}	1387.3	Porto Metropolitan Area	North
117.	Montemor-o-Novo		8,681	7,929	419.49 km^{2}	25.8	Central Alentejo	Alentejo
118.	Fundão		8,065	7,600	57.83 km^{2}	221.5	Beiras and Serra da Estrela	Center
119.	Estarreja		7,492	7,390	9.40 km^{2}	786.2	Region of Aveiro	Center
120.	Ponte de Sor		7,752	7,270	332.82 km^{2}	31.5	High Alentejo	Alentejo
121.	Fiães	Santa Maria da Feira	7,991	7,096	6.40 km^{2}	1109.0	Porto Metropolitan Area	North
122.	Moura		8,016	6,888	287.42 km^{2}	27.9	Low Alentejo	Alentejo
123.	Santa Cruz		6,952	6,850	28.10 km^{2}	253.9	Madeira	
124.	Estremoz		7,483	6,799	63.9 km^{2}	123.4	Central Alentejo	Alentejo
125.	Vale de Cambra		5,312	5,492	13.29 km^{2}	402.5	Porto Metropolitan Area	North
126.	Horta		5,553	5,110	8.48 km^{2}	662.1	Azores	
127.	Santa Comba Dão		3,279	3,160	27.11 km^{2}	162.5	Viseu Dão-Lafões	Center

== See also ==
- Subdivisions of Portugal
- List of municipalities of Portugal
  - List of Portuguese municipalities by population
- List of towns in Portugal
- List of freguesias of Portugal
