= 2025 Lisbon local election =

Portuguese local election

2025 Lisbon local elections
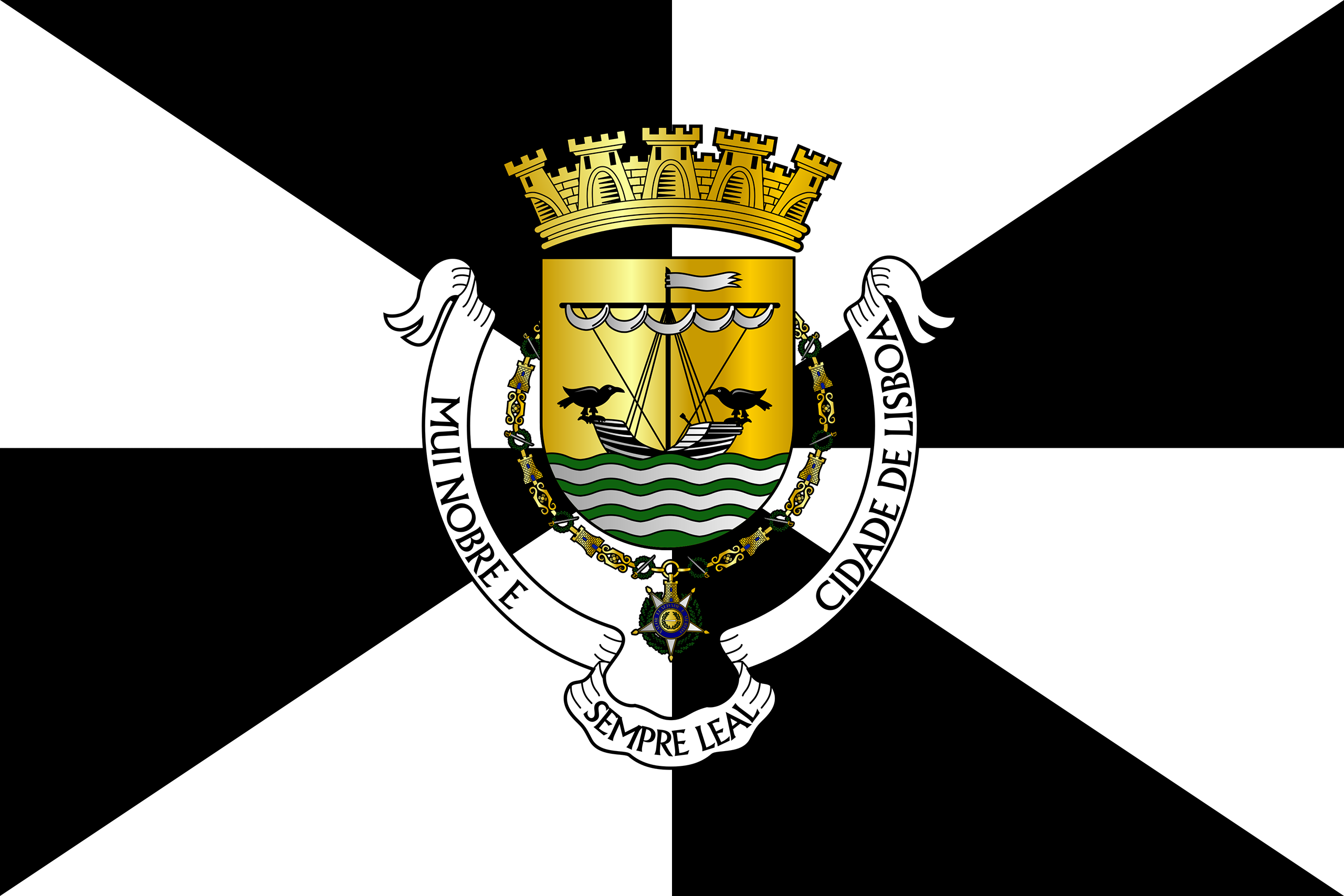
- 12 October 2025

All 17 Councillors in the Lisbon City Council 9 seats needed for a majority
- Opinion polls
- Turnout: 57.2% ▲6.3 pp
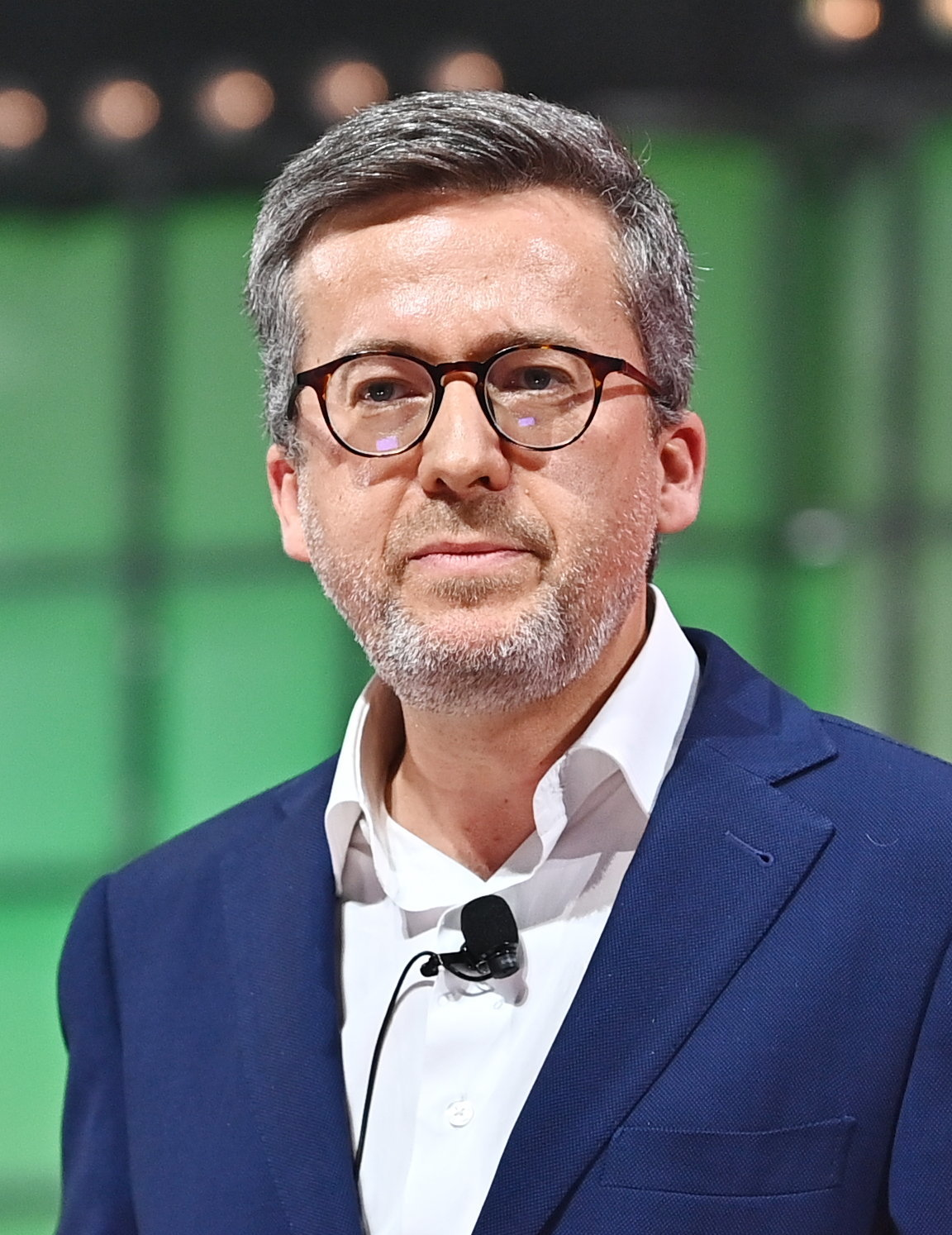

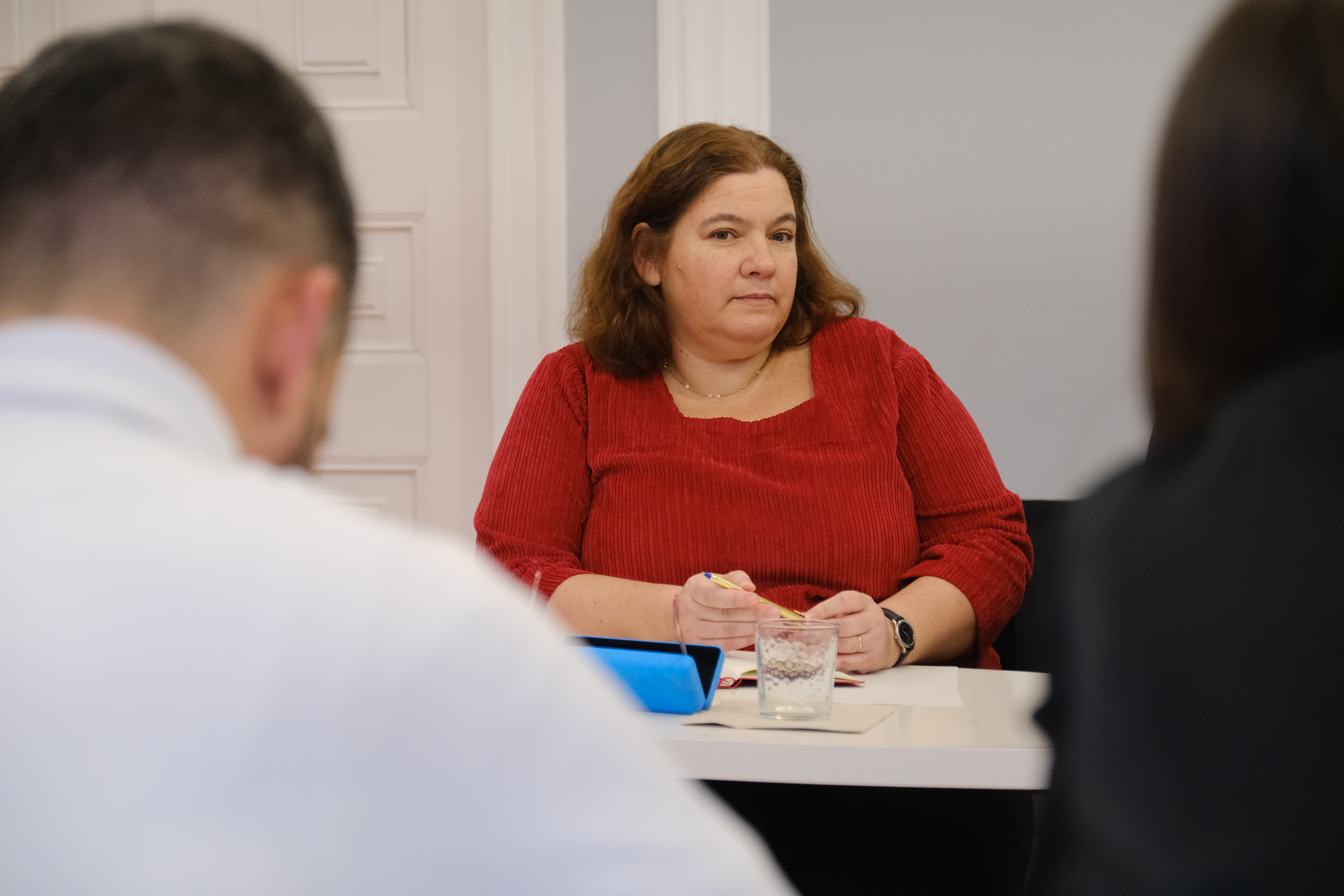

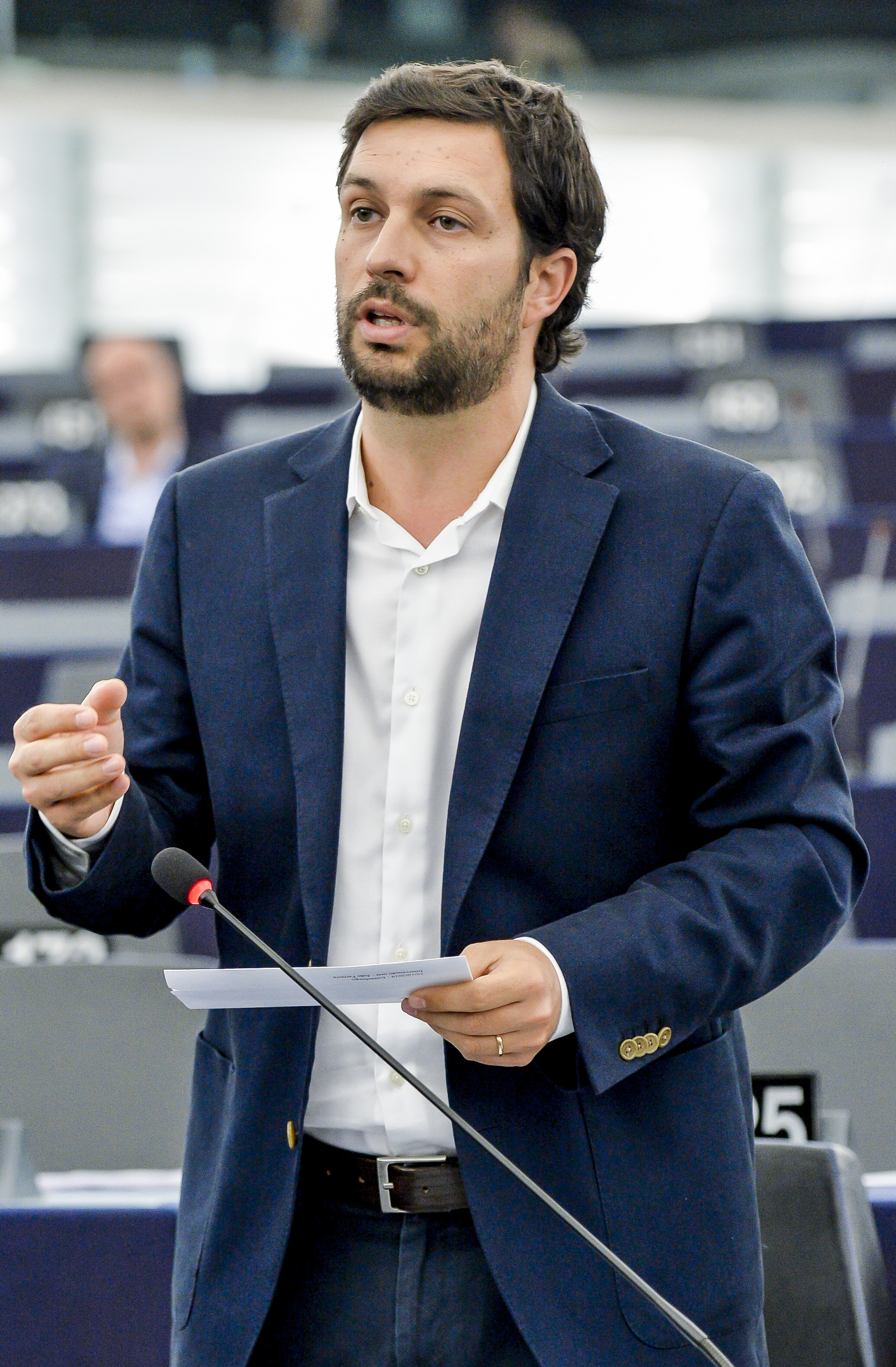
	First party	Second party
Leader	Carlos Moedas	Alexandra Leitão
Party	PSD	PS
Alliance	For You, Lisbon (Note: Coalition with PSD, IL and CDS–PP.)	Live Lisbon (Note: Coalition with PS, L, BE and PAN.)
Last election	7 seats, 38.5% (Note: In the 2021 election, PSD/CDS/MPT/PPM/A had 7 seats and 34.3% of the votes, while IL had 4.2% and failed to elect any seats.)	8 seats, 42.2% (Note: In the 2021 election, the PS+LIVRE coalition had 7 seats and 33.3% of the votes, while BE had 6.2% and 1 seat and PAN got 2.7% and failed to elect any seats.)
Seats won	8	6
Seat change	▲1	▼2
Popular vote	110,645	90,069
Percentage	41.7%	34.0%
Swing	▲3.2 pp	▼8.2 pp
	Third party	Fourth party
Leader	Bruno Mascarenhas	João Ferreira
Party	CH	PCP
Alliance		CDU
Last election	0 seats, 4.4%	2 seats, 10.5%
Seats won	2	1
Seat change	▲2	▼1
Popular vote	26,754	26,753
Percentage	10.1%	10.1%
Swing	▲5.7 pp	▼0.4 pp
Valid votes per parish
Carlos Moedas (PSD)
30–39%
40-49%
50-59%
Alexandra Leitão (PS)
30–39%
40-49%
Mayor before election
Carlos Moedas
PSD
Elected Mayor
Carlos Moedas
PSD

The 2025 Lisbon local election was held on 12 October 2025 to elect the members for Lisbon City Council, Lisbon Municipal Assembly and the city's 24 parish assemblies.

Carlos Moedas, from the Social Democratic Party, ran for a second term as mayor of Lisbon, in coalition with CDS – People's Party and also with the Liberal Initiative, while the Socialist Party, led by Alexandra Leitão, led a left-wing coalition alongside the Left Bloc, LIVRE and People Animals Nature in order to defeat the center-right coalition. The Unitary Democratic Coalition (CDU) refused to be included in the PS-led coalition, and presented, for the fourth consecutive time, João Ferreira as candidate for mayor. Chega presented local Lisbon assembly member Bruno Mascarenhas as its mayoral candidate.

Despite predictions of a razor-thin contest, Carlos Moedas was re-elected for a second term as Lisbon mayor, gathering nearly 42% of the votes, albeit without a majority, while Alexandra Leitão and her left-wing coalition fell well behind, polling at just below 34%. Chega and CDU nearly tied in terms of votes, with preliminary results showing just an 11-vote margin between them, but Chega was able to elect 2 councillors, while CDU just one, losing one compared with 2021. Turnout increased to the highest level since 1985, with 57.2% of voters casting a ballot.

Due to the small margin of votes between Chega and CDU, which at first was updated to just a 3-vote difference after the final verification of ballots, and alleged irregularities in some ballots and precincts, CDU filed an appeal to the Constitutional Court to rule on the final election result. The Court ruling reduced the difference between Chega and CDU to just 1 vote, and asked for a recount in a polling station at São Domingos de Benfica parish. The recount didn't change the one vote difference between the two parties, and, after the results of the recount were announced, CDU decided to not contest the recount's results.

== Background ==
The 2021 Lisbon local election was the biggest surprise of that year's nationwide local elections as Carlos Moedas, the candidate of the centre-right coalition led by the Social Democratic Party, managed to be elected Mayor of Lisbon and put an end to 14 years of Socialist rule. Against all expectations, the centre-right coalition managed to retake the capital by winning 34.3 percent of the votes and 7 councillors. The Socialist Party, in coalition with LIVRE, led by incumbent Mayor Fernando Medina, narrowly lost, achieving 33.3% of the votes and 7 councillors.

Meanwhile, the Unitary Democratic Coalition, led for the third time by João Ferreira, had a slight increase in its vote share to 10.5% of the votes and maintained its 2 councillors, while the Left Bloc, led by Beatriz Gomes Dias, won 6.2% of the votes and kept their sole seat. Despite results above 4% of the votes, newcomers far-right Chega and the Liberal Initiative failed to win a single seat in the municipal council, while the People Animals Nature party polled at just 2.7% of the votes and also didn't elect any seats.

Despite his victory, Carlos Moedas didn't achieve an absolute majority in either the city council or the municipal assembly, having to seek understandings and deals with the other parties represented in the City Council in order to govern.

=== Candidates selection ===
As incumbent Mayor Carlos Moedas was widely expected to run for reelection, the Socialist Party needed a candidate who could face him. After leaving office as Minister of Health, Marta Temido became president of the PS section of Lisbon in February 2023. She was widely expected to be a candidate for Mayor, until she was selected by party leader Pedro Nuno Santos as the main candidate for the 2024 European Parliament election.

The party then sought other alternatives, such as former Minister of the Environment and former Deputy Mayor Duarte Cordeiro, former Minister of the Economy Pedro Siza Vieira and even considering Pedro Nuno Santos as the party's mayoral candidate. The choice eventually fell between Mariana Vieira da Silva and the party's parliamentary leader Alexandra Leitão. Finally, on 13 January 2025, Alexandra Leitão was announced as the party's candidate for Mayor of Lisbon.

Talks about a wide left-wing coalition emerged early in the election, with the Left Bloc and LIVRE showing their interest in joining the PS to defeat Moedas. The parties also sought to include the Portuguese Communist Party, who had already announced João Ferreira as their candidate, even offering him the office of Deputy Mayor in a coalition with the other left-wing parties, to which the PCP refused. Eventually, Alexandra Leitão decided to include the People Animals Nature in a coalition with LIVRE and BE, formalizing the coalition in July 2025.

Meanwhile, Carlos Moedas sought to expand the coalition to the Liberal Initiative in order to counterbalance the effects of the left-wing coalition. The CDS fought to prevent the IL from taking influence within the coalition from them, even threatening to run its own candidate. After negotiations, an agreement was closed in July 2025, with a coalition between the PSD, the CDS–PP and IL.

== Electoral system ==
Each party or coalition must present a list of candidates. The winner of the most voted list for the municipal council is automatically elected mayor, similar to first-past-the-post (FPTP). The lists are closed and the seats in each municipality are apportioned according to the D'Hondt method. Unlike in national legislative elections, independent lists are allowed to run.

== Parties and candidates ==
Party/Coalition			Political position	Candidate	2021 result		Ref.
Party/Coalition			Political position	Candidate	Votes (%)	Seats	Ref.
PTL; For You, Lisbon (Por ti, Lisboa)	PPD/PSD	Social Democratic Party; Partido Social Democrata	Centre-right	Carlos Moedas	34.3%	4 / 17	
PTL; For You, Lisbon (Por ti, Lisboa)	CDS–PP	CDS – People's Party; CDS – Partido Popular	Centre-right to right-wing	Carlos Moedas	34.3%	3 / 17	
PTL; For You, Lisbon (Por ti, Lisboa)	IL	Liberal Initiative; Iniciativa Liberal	Centre-right to right-wing	Carlos Moedas	4.2%	0 / 17	
VL; To Live Lisbon (Viver Lisboa)	PS	Socialist Party; Partido Socialista	Centre-left	Alexandra Leitão	33.3%	6 / 17	
VL; To Live Lisbon (Viver Lisboa)	L	FREE; LIVRE	Center-left to left-wing	Alexandra Leitão	33.3%	1 / 17	
VL; To Live Lisbon (Viver Lisboa)	BE	Left Bloc; Bloco de Esquerda	Left-wing	Alexandra Leitão	6.2%	1 / 17	
VL; To Live Lisbon (Viver Lisboa)	PAN	People Animals Nature; Pessoas-Animais-Natureza	Syncretic	Alexandra Leitão	2.7%	0 / 17	
CDU	Unitary Democratic Coalition; Coligação Democrática Unitária PCP, PEV		Left-wing to far-left	João Ferreira	10.5%	2 / 17	
CH	Enough! Chega!		Far-right	Bruno Mascarenhas	4.4%	0 / 17	
VP	Volt Portugal; Volt Portugal		Centre to centre-left	José Almeida	0.4%	0 / 17	
ADN	National Democratic Alternative; Alternativa Democrática Nacional		Far-right	Adelaide Ferreira	0.1% (Note: Compared with the result of Democratic Republican Party. In late 2021, the Democratic Republican Party (PDR) changed its name to the National Democratic Alternative (ADN).)	0 / 17	
ND	New Right; Nova Direita		Right-wing	Ossanda Liber	—N/a	—N/a	
DA	Alliance Democratic; Democrática Aliança PPM, PTP		Centre-right	Tomaz Ponce Dentinho	—N/a	—N/a	
RIR	React, Include, Recycle; Reagir, Incluir, Reciclar,		Syncretic	Luís Mendes	—N/a	—N/a	

== Campaign period ==
=== Issues ===
Just five weeks before election day, a funicular derailed in the Glória elevator killing 16 people, and injuring 23 others. The question of maintenance, and the quality of it, is being investigated as it was made by a private outsourcing company. Carlos Moedas faced calls to resign and questions were raised on how much this would impact the outcome of the election, as also many of the decisions regarding maintenance of public transportation were made during the Socialist Party (PS) terms between 2007 and 2021.

=== Party slogans ===
Party or alliance	Original slogan	English translation	Refs
PTL	« Por Ti, Lisboa »	"For You, Lisbon"	
VL	« Viver Lisboa »	"To Live Lisbon"	
CDU	« Lisboa, cidade da nossa vida »	"Lisbon, the city of our lives"	
CH	« Defender Lisboa »	"Defend Lisbon"	
VP	« Religa-te a Lisboa »	"Reconnect with Lisbon"	
ADN	« Lisboa vai ter o papel principal »	"Lisbon will have the main role"	
ND	« Resgatar Lisboa »	"Rescue Lisbon"	

=== Candidates' debates ===
2025 Lisbon local election debates
Date	Organisers	Moderator(s)	P Present (Note: Denotes a main invitee attending the event.) NI Not invited I Invited A Absent invitee				
Date	Organisers	Moderator(s)	PTL Moedas	VL Leitão	CDU Ferreira	CH Mascarenhas	Refs
15 Sep 2025	SIC	Nelma Serpa Pinto	P	P	P	P	
19 Sep 2025	Rádio Observador	Carla Jorge de Carvalho; Miguel Viterbo Dias	P	P	P	P	
23 Sep 2025	CNN Portugal	João Póvoa Marinheiro	P	P	P	P	
2 Oct 2025	RTP1	Carlos Daniel	P	P	P	P	

== Opinion polling ==
Exit poll

Polling firm/Link	Fieldwork date	Sample size	PTL			VL				CDU	CH	ADN	ND	PPM PTP	O	Lead
Polling firm/Link	Fieldwork date	Sample size	PSD	CDS	IL	PS	L	BE	PAN	CDU	CH	ADN	ND	PPM PTP	O	Lead
2025 local election	12 Oct 2025	—N/a	41.7; 8			34.0; 6				10.1; 1	10.1; 2	0.4; 0	0.3; 0	0.3; 0	3.1; 0	7.7
CESOP–UCP	12 Oct 2025	5,658	37–42; 6/9			37–42; 6/9				8–11; 1/2	7–10; 1/2	0–1; 0	0–1; 0	0–1; 0	1–5; 0	Tie
ICS/ISCTE/ Pitagórica	12 Oct 2025	9,832	36.8–42.0; 6/8			33.7–38.9; 6/8				9.0– 12.4; 1/3	7.7– 11.1; 1/2					3.1
Intercampus	12 Oct 2025	8,700	37.9–41.9; 6/8			34.8–38.8; 6/8				8.9– 12.9; 1/3	7.0– 11.0; 0/2				1.4– 5.4	3.1
CESOP–UCP	27–29 Sep 2025	1,066	35; 6/8			36; 6/8				8; 1/2	12; 2	1; 0	1; 0	2; 0	5; 0	1
Pitagórica	23–28 Sep 2025	625	38.7; 7			35.7; 7				11.7; 2	9.6; 1	0.6; 0	0.6; 0	—N/a	3.1; 0	3.0
ICS/ISCTE	13–23 Sep 2025	807	36; 7			35; 6				6; 1	16; 3	2; 0	1; 0	—N/a	4; 0	1
ICS/ISCTE	14–27 Jul 2025	800	41; 8			36; 7				5; 0	14; 2	—N/a	—N/a	—N/a	4; 0	5
2025 Legislative election	18 May 2025	—N/a	31.7 (6)		9.3 (1)	23.3 (5)	9.4 (2)	2.7 (0)	1.7 (0)	3.7 (0)	14.5 (3)	0.9 (0)	0.1 (0)	—N/a	2.8 (0)	8.4
2024 EP election	9 Jun 2024	—N/a	27.9 (5)		14.7 (3)	26.7 (5)	7.5 (1)	6.1 (1)	1.4 (0)	4.9 (1)	7.6 (1)	0.8 (0)	0.1 (0)	—N/a	2.3 (0)	1.2
2024 Legislative election	10 Mar 2024	—N/a	32.3 (7)		7.5 (1)	26.2 (5)	7.7 (1)	5.1 (1)	2.1 (0)	3.5 (0)	11.7 (2)	1.1 (0)	0.2 (0)	—N/a	2.6 (0)	6.1
2022 Legislative election	30 Jan 2022	—N/a	27.4 (6)	2.3 (0)	10.6 (2)	36.4 (7)	3.8 (0)	4.7 (0)	1.8 (0)	4.7 (1)	5.6 (1)	—N/a	0.2 (0)	—N/a	2.4 (0)	6.6
2021 local election	26 Sep 2021	—N/a	34.3; 7		4.2; 0	33.3; 7		6.2; 1	2.7; 0	10.5; 2	4.4; 0	0.1; 0	—N/a	—N/a	4.3; 0	1.0

== Results ==
=== Municipal Council ===
Summary of the 12 October 2025 Lisbon City Council elections results
Graph of the party split among 17 seats.
Parties	Votes	%	±pp swing	Councillors	
Parties	Votes	%	±pp swing	Total	±
Social Democratic / People's / Liberal Initiative	110,645	41.71	▲3.2	8	▲1
PS / LIVRE / BE / PAN	90,069	33.95	▼8.2	6	▼2
Chega	26,754	10.08	▲5.7	2	▲2
Unitary Democratic Coalition	26,753	10.08	▼0.4	1	▼1
Volt Portugal	1,047	0.39	▼0.0	0	0
National Democratic Alternative	994	0.37	▲0.3	0	0
New Right	909	0.34	—N/a	0	—N/a
People's Monarchist / Labour	903	0.34	—N/a	0	—N/a
React, Include, Recycle	439	0.17	—N/a	0	—N/a
Earth	0	0.00	—N/a	0	—N/a
Total valid	258,513	97.44	▲0.6	17	0
Blank ballots	3,835	1.45	▼0.6		
Invalid ballots	2,946	1.11	▲0.0		
Total	265,294	100.00			
Registered voters/turnout	463,566	57.23	▲6.3		

=== Municipal Assembly ===
Summary of the 12 October 2025 Lisbon Municipal Assembly elections results
Graph of the party split among 51 seats.
Parties	Votes	%	±pp swing	Seats	
Parties	Votes	%	±pp swing	Total	±
Social Democratic / People's / Liberal Initiative	104,931	39.54	▲2.4	21	▲1
PS / LIVRE / BE / PAN	87,180	32.86	▼9.1	18	▼4
Chega	30,913	11.65	▲6.3	6	▲3
Unitary Democratic Coalition	30,124	11.35	▲0.2	6	0
Volt Portugal	1,571	0.59	▲0.0	0	0
National Democratic Alternative	1,061	0.40	—N/a	0	—N/a
New Right	1,059	0.40	—N/a	0	—N/a
People's Monarchist / Labour	928	0.35	—N/a	0	—N/a
React, Include, Recycle	558	0.21	—N/a	0	—N/a
Earth	552	0.20	—N/a	0	—N/a
Total valid	258,877	97.56	▲0.9	51	0
Blank ballots	4,087	1.54	▼0.6		
Invalid ballots	2,382	0.90	▼0.3		
Total	265,346	100.00			
Registered voters/turnout	462,464	57.38	▲6.5		

=== Parish Assemblies ===
Results of the 12 October 2025 Lisbon Parish Assembly elections
Parish	%	S	%	S	%	S	%	S	%	S	Total S
Parish	PTL		VL		CDU		CH		IND		Total S
Ajuda	23.9	3	46.6	7	12.2	1	14.1	2			13
Alcântara	31.5	4	48.0	7	8.2	1	9.3	1			13
Alvalade	46.3	10	33.4	7	9.7	2					19
Areeiro	48.9	7	33.4	4	8.8	1	8.3	1			13
Arroios	33.3	7	42.3	8	11.7	2	9.6	2			19
Avenidas Novas	50.3	11	28.3	6	7.9	1	9.0	1			19
Beato	26.3	4	38.2	5	13.8	2	17.6	2			13
Belém	57.6	8	26.7	4	7.1	1					13
Benfica	26.9	5	54.5	11	6.3	1	9.5	2			19
Campo de Ourique	41.2	6	38.9	5	8.3	1	8.3	1			13
Campolide	39.5	6	36.2	5	8.8	1	12.7	1			13
Carnide	26.6	4	19.3	2	41.7	6	9.5	1			13
Estrela	53.5	7	28.1	4	7.5	1	8.5	1			13
Lumiar	46.1	10	31.1	6	8.5	1	9.7	2			19
Marvila	21.9	4	38.2	8	9.7	2	26.0	5			19
Misericórdia	35.8	5	38.3	5	13.7	2	8.4	1			13
Olivais	23.8	5	29.2	6	8.2	1	12.6	3	23.2	4	19
Parque das Nações	49.8	7	30.3	4	6.3	1	11.1	1			13
Penha de França	26.5	5	39.6	8	16.5	3	13.9	3			19
Santa Clara	27.1	4	32.4	5	9.9	1	24.2	3			13
Santa Maria Maior	23.3	3	41.0	6	17.6	2	14.3	2			13
Santo António	49.4	7	32.3	5	9.1	1					13
São Domingos de Benfica	46.2	10	34.7	7	8.6	1	7.6	1			19
São Vicente	20.9	3	40.3	6	18.4	2	8.7	1	8.9	1	13
Total	37.5	145	35.5	141	10.7	38	10.4	37	1.6	5	366

== Aftermath ==
Carlos Moedas was sworn in for a second term, under a minority capacity, on 11 November 2025. In January 2026, one of the two Chega councillors, Ana Simões Silva, announced she was leaving the party, due to "insurmountable political incompatibilities" with the party, and became an independent. A few weeks later, on 11 February 2026, it was announced that Ana Simões Silva would join Moedas local government, thus guaranteeing an absolute majority for Moedas in Lisbon's City Council.
