= Pinto Basto =

Pinto Basto is a compound Portuguese surname. Notable people with the surname include:

- Eduardo Pinto Basto (1869–?), Portuguese football pioneer;
- Filipe Pinto Basto Soares Franco (born 1953), the 46th president of Sporting CP;
- Frederico Pinto Basto (1872–1939), Portuguese football pioneer;
- Guilherme Pinto Basto (1864–1957), Portuguese all-round sportsman, entrepreneur, and brother of the above;
- Hugo Pinto Basto (born 1993), Portuguese professional footballer;
- Joaquim Pinto Basto (1932–2008), Portuguese sailor;
- Teodoro Pinto Basto (1839–1920), Portuguese businessman and politician who served as the mayor of Lisbon.
