= 2021 Lisbon local election =

2021 Lisbon local elections
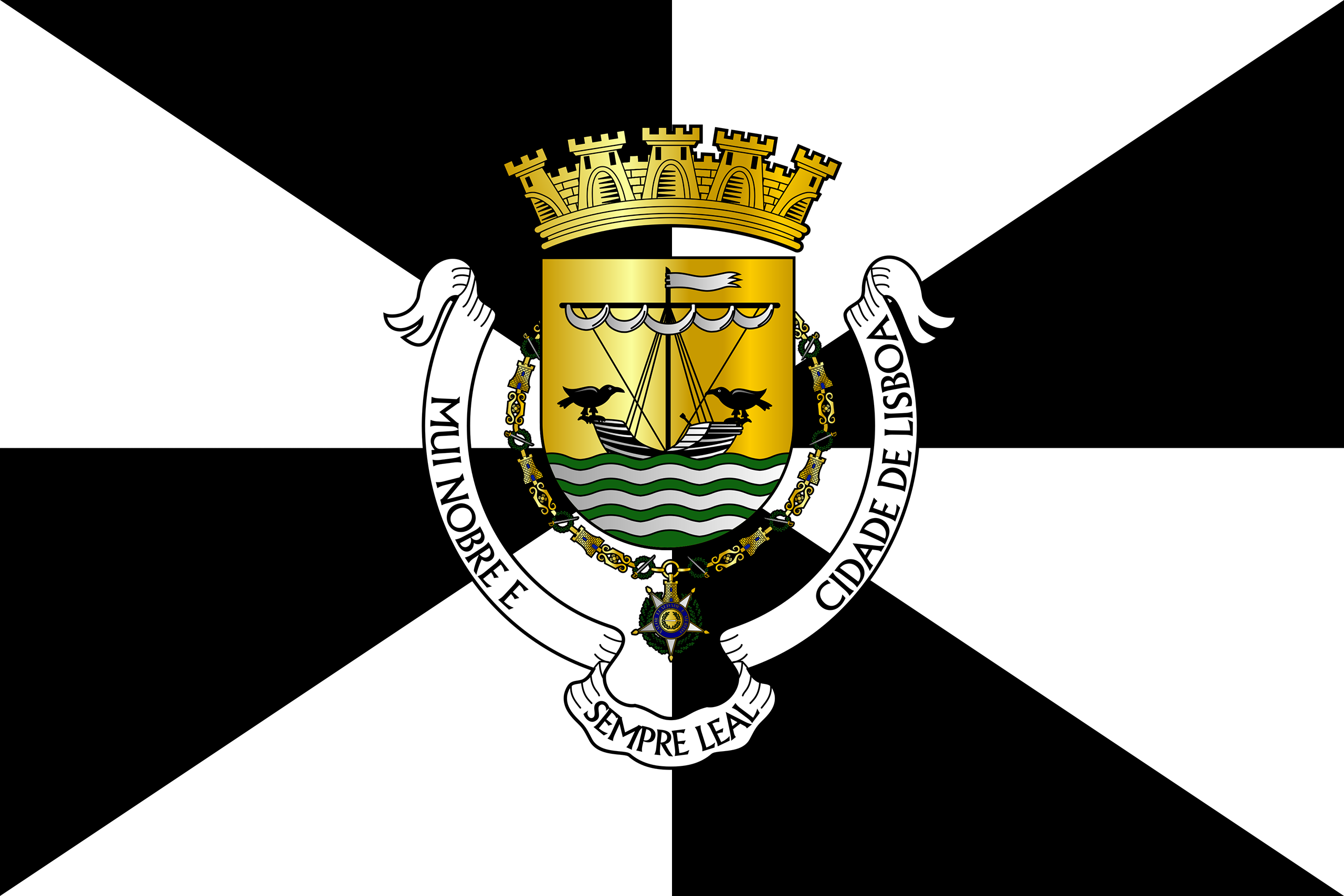
- 26 September 2021

All 17 Councillors in the Lisbon City Council 9 seats needed for a majority
- Opinion polls
- Turnout: 51.0% ▼0.1 pp
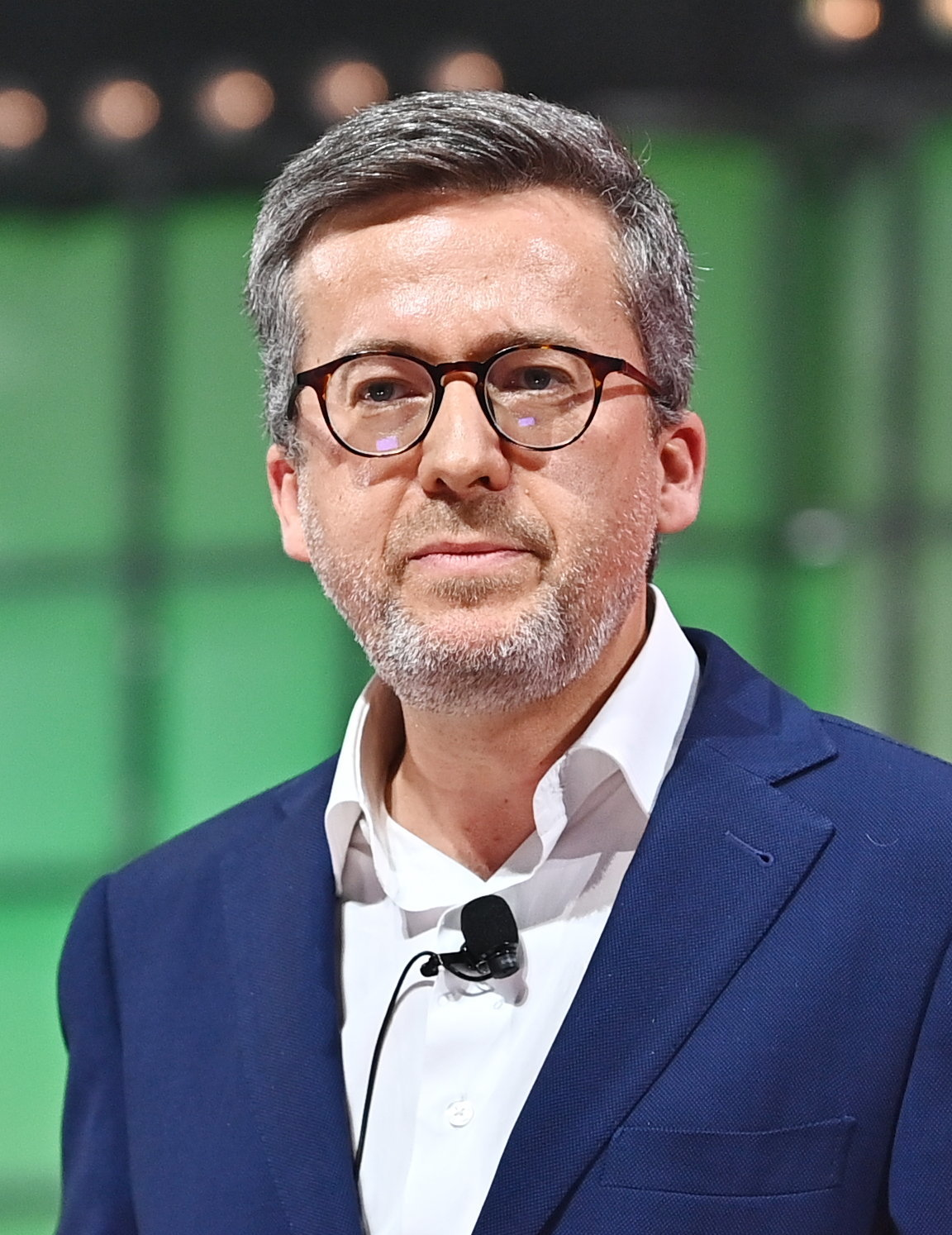

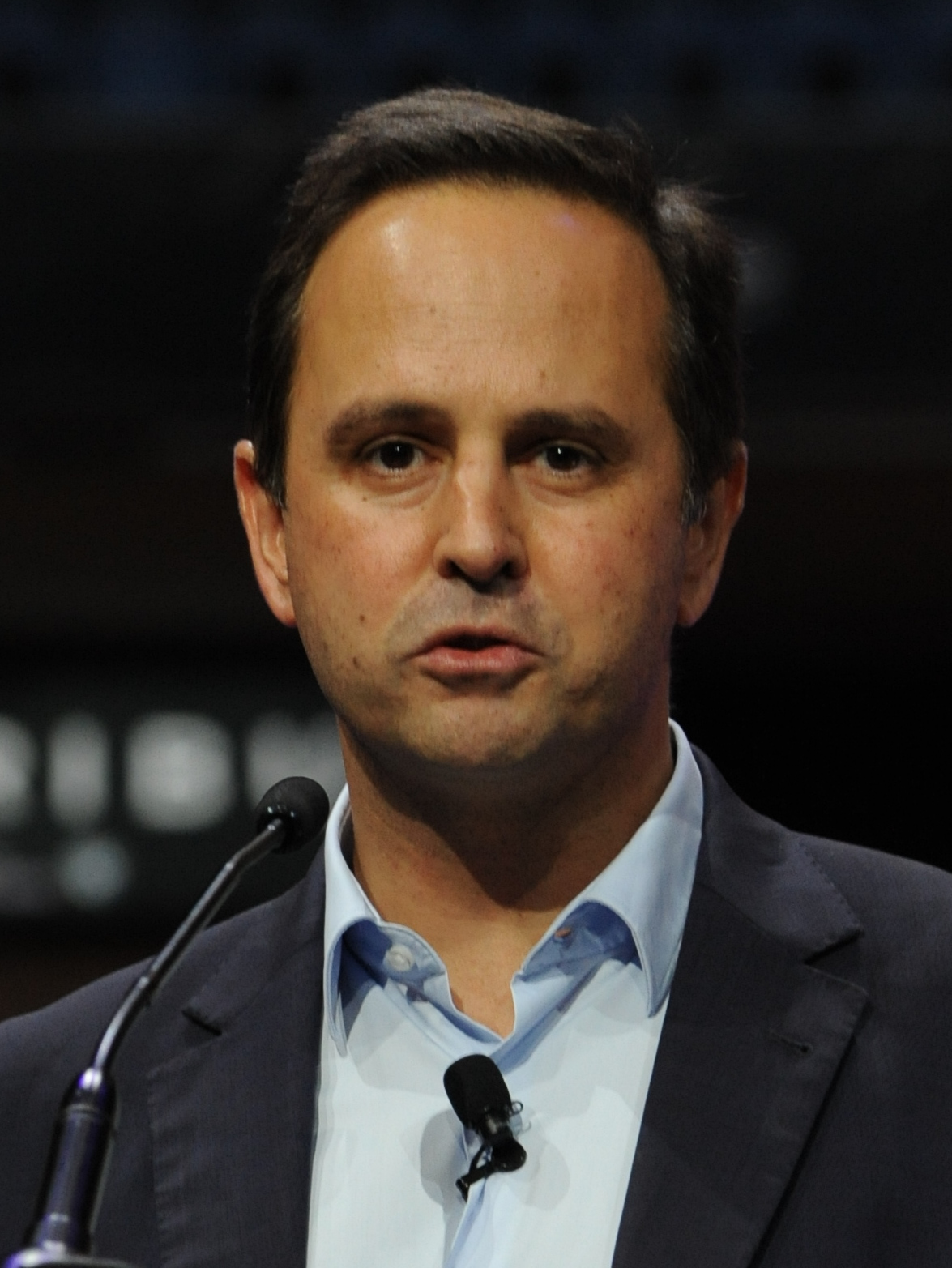

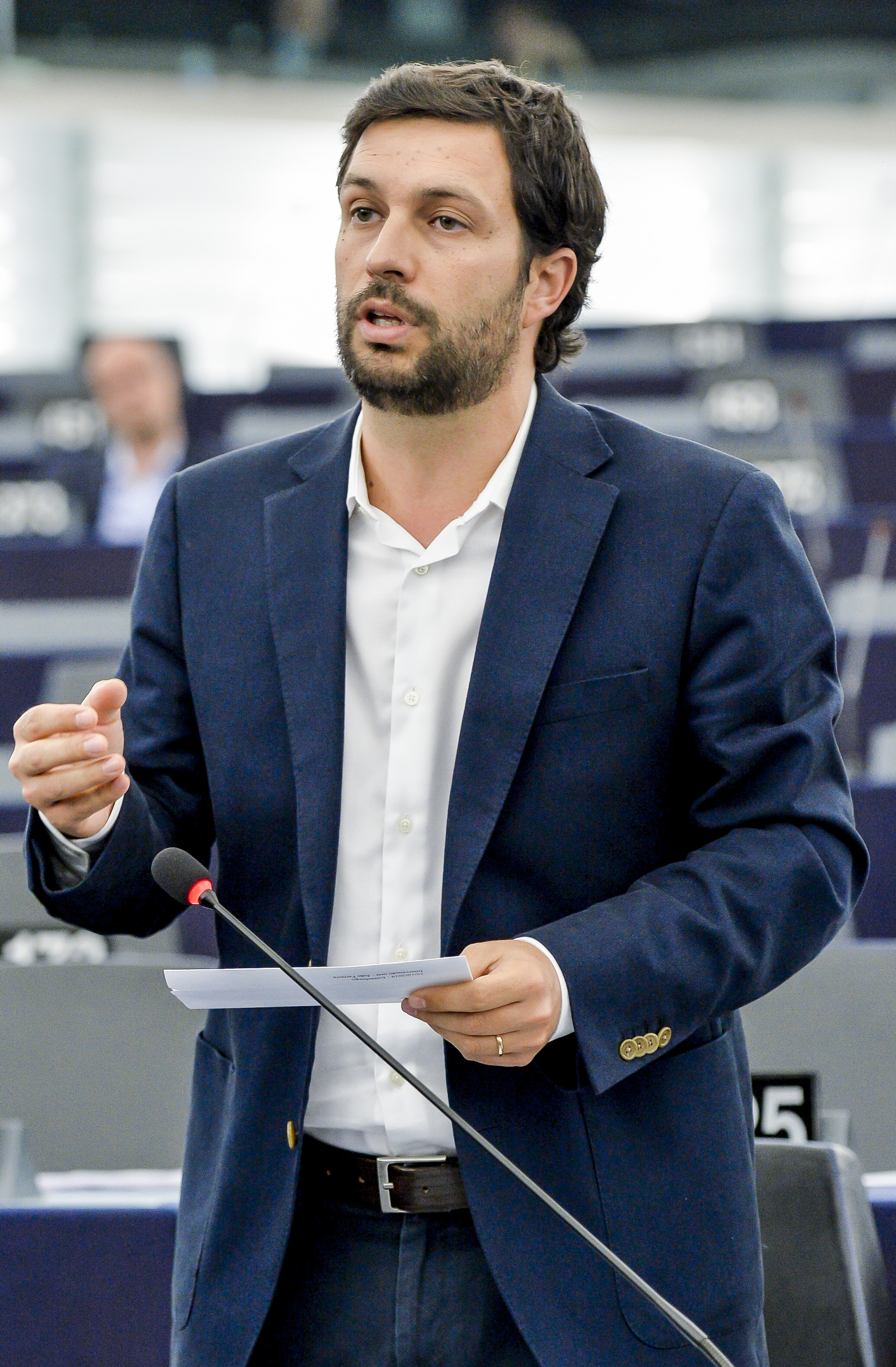

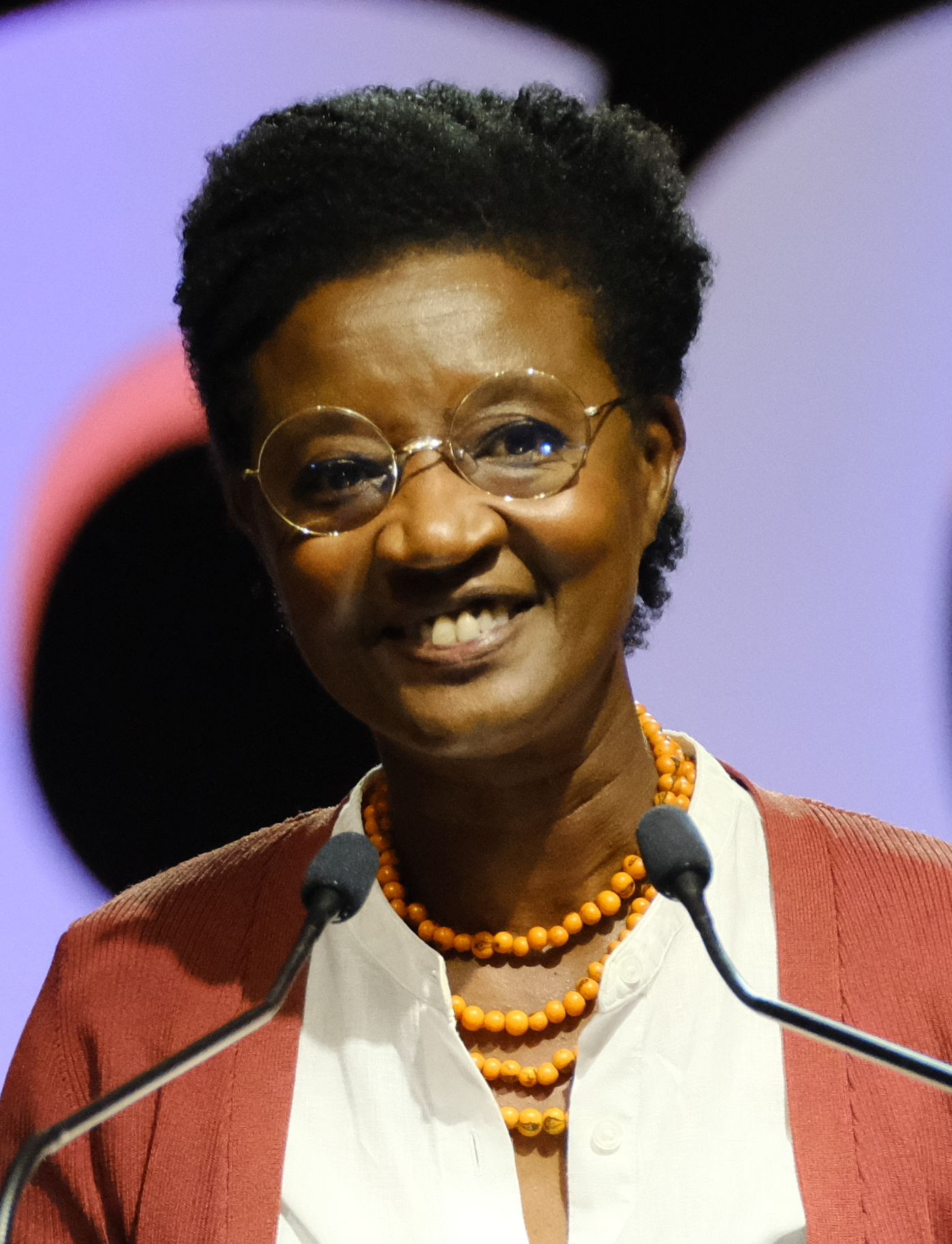

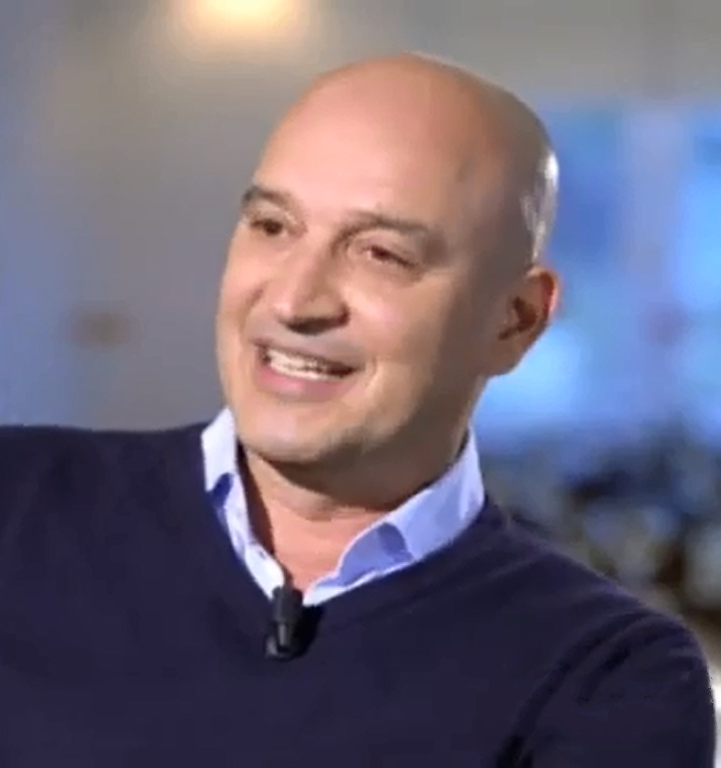

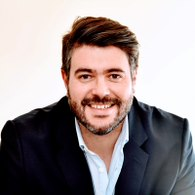
	First party	Second party	Third party
Leader	Carlos Moedas	Fernando Medina	João Ferreira
Party	PSD	PS	PCP
Alliance	New Times (Note: Coalition with PSD, CDS–PP, Alliance, MPT and PPM.)	More Lisbon (Note: Coalition between the PS and LIVRE.)	CDU
Last election	6 seats, 31.8% (Note: Sum of the PSD and CDS separate results in 2017.)	8 seats, 42.0%	2 seats, 9.5%
Seats won	7	7	2
Seat change	▲1	▼1	Steady
Popular vote	83,185	80,907	25,550
Percentage	34.3%	33.3%	10.5%
Swing	▲2.5 pp	▼8.7 pp	▲1.0 pp
	Fourth party	Fifth party	Sixth party
Leader	Beatriz Gomes Dias	Nuno Graciano	Bruno Horta Soares
Party	BE	CH	IL
Last election	1 seat, 7.1%	Did not contest	Did not contest
Seats won	1	0	0
Seat change	Steady	New party	New party
Popular vote	15,057	10,730	10,213
Percentage	6.2%	4.4%	4.2%
Swing	▼0.9 pp	New party	New party
Valid votes per parish
Carlos Moedas (PSD)
30–39%
40-49%
50-59%
Fernando Medina (PS)
30–39%
40-49%
50-59%
Mayor before election
Fernando Medina
PS
Elected Mayor
Carlos Moedas
PSD

The 2021 Lisbon local election was held on 26 September 2021 to elect the members of the Lisbon City Council.

In a major upset, Carlos Moedas, the candidate of the centre-right New Times coalition led by the Social Democratic Party (PSD), was elected Mayor of Lisbon. The coalition managed to win with 34.3 percent of the votes and 7 councilors.

Incumbent mayor Fernando Medina, candidate of the Socialist Party (PS) running in alliance with LIVRE, lost his reelection bid, an office he had hold since 2015 and which had been held by PS since 2007. PS lost almost 10 percent of the votes compared with the previous election, with Medina labeling the defeat as "personal".

The Unitary Democratic Coalition (CDU) presented former MEP João Ferreira as their candidate, registering a slight electoral growth to 10.5 percent, the best result for CDU since 2005, and guaranteeing two Communist councilors. The Left Bloc, which presented Beatriz Gomes Dias as a candidate for mayor, managed to keep their sole seat in the municipal council, despite a slight drop in votes. People-Animals-Nature, Chega, and Liberal Initiative failed to elect any councilors.

== Background ==
In the 2017 election, the Socialist Party led by Fernando Medina, won with a comfortable advantage over the opposition parties, although losing its absolute majority. The center-right wing alliance led by Assunção Cristas' CDS - Peoples Party obtained a historic result for the chamber, surpassing 20 percent of the votes and electing 4 councilors. The Social Democratic Party, which had Teresa Leal Coelho as its candidate, had its worst result in history in Lisbon, finishing in third place, with just over 11 percent of the votes and 2 councilors, a far cry from PS and CDS.

The Unitary Democratic Coalition obtained 9.6 percent, winning 2 councilors and the Left Bloc obtained its best municipal result in the city, managing to win 1 councilor with 7.1 percent and entering in a coalition with the Socialists.

== Electoral system ==
Each party or coalition must present a list of candidates. The winner of the most voted list for the municipal council is automatically elected mayor, similar to first-past-the-post (FPTP). The lists are closed and the seats in each municipality are apportioned according to the D'Hondt method. Unlike in national legislative elections, independent lists are allowed to run.

== Parties and candidates ==
Party/Coalition		Political position	Candidate	2017 result	
Party/Coalition		Political position	Candidate	Votes (%)	Seats
ML	More Lisbon; Mais Lisboa PS, LIVRE	Centre-left	Fernando Medina	42.0%	8 / 17
NT	New Times; Novos Tempos PPD/PSD, CDS–PP, A, MPT, PPM	Centre-right	Carlos Moedas	31.8%	6 / 17
CDU	Unitary Democratic Coalition; Coligação Democrática Unitária PCP, PEV	Left-wing to far-left	João Ferreira	9.5%	2 / 17
BE	Left Bloc; Bloco de Esquerda	Left-wing to far-left	Beatriz Gomes Dias	7.1%	1 / 17
PAN	People Animals Nature; Pessoas-Animais-Natureza	Centre-left	Manuela Gonzaga	3.0%	0 / 17
NC	We, the Citizens! Nós, Cidadãos!	Centre-right	Sofia Afonso Ferreira	0.6%	0 / 17
E	Rise Up (Note: In July 2020, the National Renovator Party (PNR) changed its name to Rise Up (E).); Ergue-te	Far-right	João Patrocínio	0.5%	0 / 17
PDR	Democratic Republican Party; Partido Democrático Republicano	Centre	Bruno Fialho	0.3%	0 / 17
IL	Liberal Initiative; Iniciativa Liberal	Centre-right to right-wing	Bruno Horta Soares	—N/a	—N/a
CH	Enough! Chega!	Right-wing to far-right	Nuno Graciano	—N/a	—N/a
VP	Volt Portugal; Volt Portugal	Centre to centre-left	Tiago Matos Gomes	—N/a	—N/a
STL	We are all Lisbon; Somos todos Lisboa	Right-wing	Ossanda Liber	—N/a	—N/a

== Campaign period ==
=== Issues ===
In June 2021, it was revealed that Lisbon City Hall had voluntarily sent, since 2012, personal data of dissidents from authoritarian regimes living in Lisbon to the respective embassies of these countries, mainly Russia, in what was called the Russiagate scandal. Mayor Fernando Medina said he was unaware of these actions by City Hall, saying it was a regrettable mistake and that he was sorry. Lisbon City Hall was later ordered to pay fines of several thousand euros.

Just a few days before election day, Sábado magazine also revealed that the Socialist Party (PS) parish president of Arroios, Margarida Martins, used parish services for personal expenses. A criminal investigation was later opened.

=== Party slogans ===
Party or alliance	Original slogan	English translation	Refs
ML	« Mais Lisboa »	"More Lisbon"	
NT	« Novos Tempos » « Lisboa pode ser muito mais do que imaginas »	"New Times" "Lisbon can be much more than you think"	
CDU	« Por uma Lisboa com vida »	"For a Lisbon with life"	
BE	« Uma cidade em comum »	"A city in common"	
PAN	« Lisboa nas tuas mãos »	"Lisbon in your hands "	
IL	« 1 vereador liberal faz toda a diferença »	"1 liberal councillor makes all the difference"	
CH	« Chega. Lisboa sem Corrupção »	"Enough. Lisbon without corruption"	

=== Candidates' debates ===
2021 Lisbon local election debates
Date	Organisers	Moderator(s)	P Present A Absent invitee N Non-invitee												
Date	Organisers	Moderator(s)	ML Medina	NT Moedas	CDU Ferreira	BE Dias	PAN Gonzaga	IL Soares	CH Graciano	NC S. Ferreira	E Patrocínio	PDR Fialho	VP Gomes	STL Liber	Refs
2 Sep 2021	SIC Notícias	Clara de Sousa	P	P	P	P	P	P	P	N	N	N	N	N	
7 Sep 2021	TVI, TVI24	Sara Pinto	P	P	N	N	N	N	N	N	N	N	N	N	
9 Sep 2021	Antena 1	Natália Carvalho	P	P	P	P	P	P	P	P	P	P	P	P	
15 Sep 2021	RTP1, RTP3	António José Teixeira	P	P	P	P	P	P	P	P	P	P	P	P	

== Opinion polling ==
Exit poll

Polling firm/Link	Fieldwork date	Sample size	PS L	PSD CDS PPM MPT A	CDU	BE	PAN	IL	CH	O	Lead
2021 local election	26 Sep 2021	—N/a	33.3; 7	34.3; 7	10.5; 2	6.2; 1	2.7; 0	4.2; 0	4.4; 0	4.4; 0	1.0
CESOP–UCP	26 Sep 2021	4,146	31–35; 6/8	32–36; 6/8	10–13; 1/2	5–7; 1	2–4; 0	3–5; 0/1	3–5; 0/1	2–9; 0	1
ICS/ISCTE	26 Sep 2021	8,159	31.3– 36.3; 6/8	30.2– 35.2; 6/8	10.4– 13.4; 2/3	5.7– 8.7; 1/2	1.8– 3.8; 0	3.2– 6.2; 0/1	2.4– 5.4; 0/1	1.6– 4.6; 0	1.1
Pitagórica	26 Sep 2021	6,206	32.6– 38.6; 7	29.3– 35.3; 6/7	6.6– 12.6; 2	4.2– 8.2; 1	1.0– 5.0; 0	3.3– 7.3; 0/1	1.9– 5.9; 0	2.1– 6.1; 0	3.3– 3.7
Intercampus	26 Sep 2021	6,406	32.0– 36.4; 6/8	31.2– 35.6; 6/8	10.1– 13.7; 1/3	5.5– 8.5; 0/2	1.6– 4.6; 0/1	2.9– 5.9; 0/1	1.6– 4.6; 0/1	2.5– 3.3; 0	0.8
Pitagórica	15–21 Sep 2021	600	40.6; 8/9	33.1; 6/7	7.6; 1	4.7; 0/1	3.2; 0	3.2; 0	2.1; 0	5.5; 0	7.5
CESOP–UCP	16–20 Sep 2021	1,292	37; 7/8	28; 5/6	11; 1/2	7; 1	3; 0	5; 0/1	3; 0	6; 0	9
Pitagórica	30 Aug–4 Sep 2021	600	39.8; 8/9	32.6; 6/7	8.5; 1	6.8; 1	3.8; 0	3.0; 0	2.8; 0	2.7; 0	7.2
Intercampus	25–30 Aug 2021	642	45.2; 9	27.0; 5	9.7; 2	8.5; 1	1.8; 0	2.1; 0	3.2; 0	2.5; 0	18.2
Eurosondagem	23–26 Aug 2021	2,225	38.6; 8	26.9; 4	7.7; 0/2	6.3; 0/2	3.3; 0/1	6.3; 0/2	4.8; 0/2	6.1; 0	11.7
Aximage	14–21 Aug 2021	792	51	27	9	4	2	2	2	3	24
ICS/ISCTE	3–18 Jul 2021	803	42	31	6	8	3	2	4	4	11
Intercampus	8–13 Apr 2021	611	46.6	25.7	7.1	6.6	0.5	2.3	6.1	5.1	20.9
2019 legislative election	6 Oct 2019	—N/a	36.5 (8)	33.1 (7)	7.0 (1)	9.1 (1)	4.1 (0)	4.1 (0)	1.4 (0)	4.7 (0)	3.4
2019 EP election	26 May 2019	—N/a	33.9 (7)	31.1 (6)	7.0 (1)	10.7 (2)	6.6 (1)	2.0 (0)	—N/a	8.7 (0)	2.8
2017 local election	1 Oct 2017	—N/a	42.0; 8	31.8; 6	9.6; 2	7.1; 1	3.0; 0	—N/a	—N/a	6.5 (0)	10.2

== Results ==
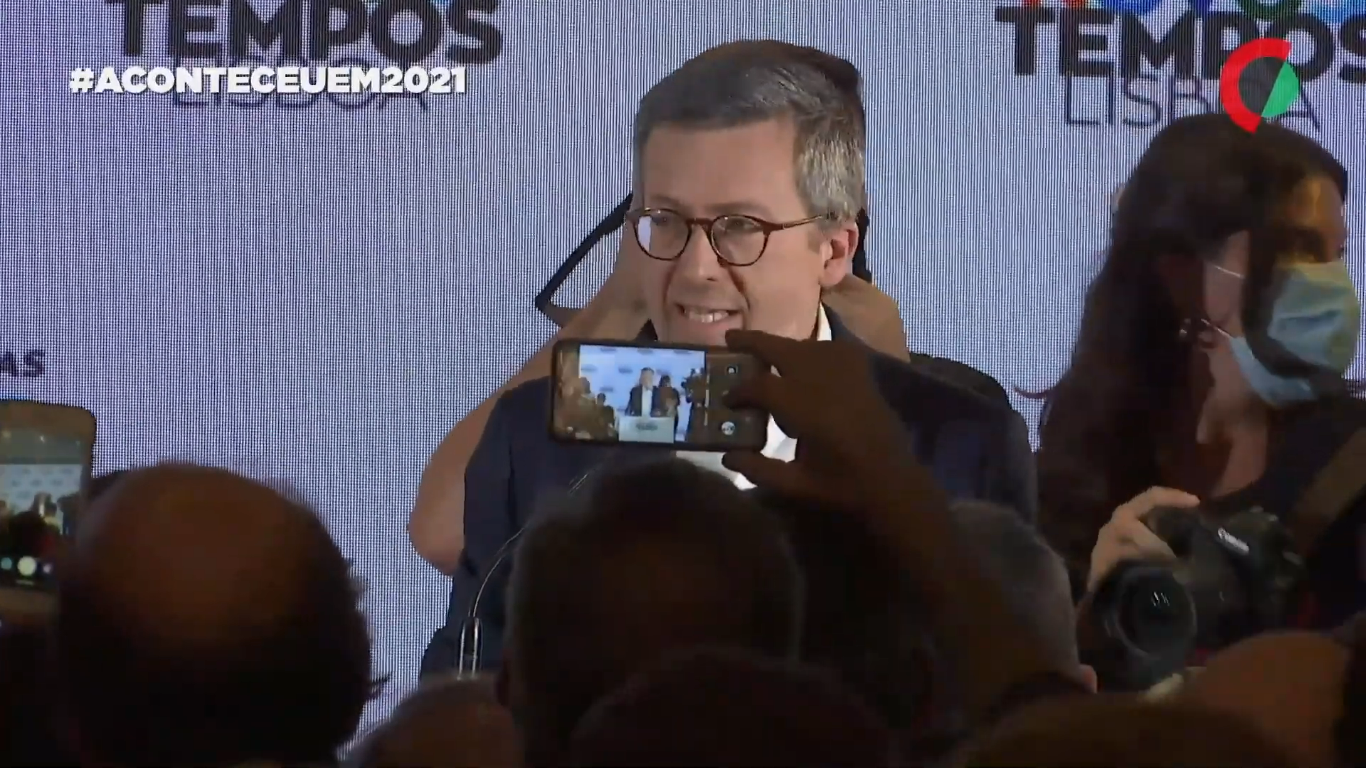
Carlos Moedas delivering his victory speech on election night 2021.

=== Municipal Council ===
Summary of the 26 September 2021 Lisbon City Council elections results
Parties	Votes	%	±pp swing	Councillors	
Parties	Votes	%	±pp swing	Total	±
PSD / CDS–PP / Alliance / MPT / PPM	83,185	34.27	▲2.5	7	▲1
Socialist / LIVRE	80,907	33.33	▼8.7	7	▼1
Unitary Democratic Coalition	25,550	10.53	▲1.0	2	0
Left Bloc	15,057	6.20	▼0.9	1	0
Chega	10,730	4.42	—N/a	0	—N/a
Liberal Initiative	10,213	4.21	—N/a	0	—N/a
People–Animals–Nature	6,625	2.73	▼0.3	0	0
Volt Portugal	1,016	0.42	—N/a	0	—N/a
We are all Lisbon (STL)	864	0.36	—N/a	0	—N/a
We, the Citizens!	494	0.20	▼0.4	0	0
Rise Up	338	0.14	▼0.4	0	0
Democratic Republican	319	0.13	▼0.2	0	0
Total valid	235,298	96.93	▲1.1	17	0
Blank ballots	4,823	1.99	▼0.6		
Invalid ballots	2,622	1.08	▼0.4		
Total	242,743	100.00			
Registered voters/turnout	476,050	50.99	▼0.1		
Source: Lisbon 2021 election results

=== Municipal Assembly ===
Summary of the 26 September 2021 Lisbon Municipal Assembly elections results
Parties	Votes	%	±pp swing	Seats	
Parties	Votes	%	±pp swing	Total	±
PSD / CDS–PP / Alliance / MPT / PPM	75,616	31.15	▼0.9	17	0
Socialist / LIVRE	74,765	30.80	▼6.9	17	▼5
Unitary Democratic Coalition	26,890	11.08	▲0.9	6	0
Left Bloc	18,528	7.63	▼0.8	4	0
Liberal Initiative	14,447	5.95	—N/a	3	—N/a
Chega	13,004	5.36	—N/a	3	—N/a
People–Animals–Nature	8,573	3.53	▼0.8	1	▼1
Volt Portugal	1,401	0.58	—N/a	0	—N/a
We are all Lisbon (STL)	1,069	0.44	—N/a	0	—N/a
Rise Up	438	0.18	▼0.4	0	0
Total valid	234,731	96.70	▲1.1	51	0
Blank ballots	5,337	2.20	▼0.7		
Invalid ballots	2,671	1.10	▼0.4		
Total	242,739	100.00			
Registered voters/turnout	476,740	50.92	▼0.2		
Source: Lisbon 2021 election results

=== Parish Assemblies ===
Results of the 26 September 2021 Lisbon Parish Assembly elections
Parish	%	S	%	S	%	S	%	S	%	S	%	S	%	S	%	S	Total S
Parish	ML		NT		CDU		BE		IL		CH		PAN		IND		Total S
Ajuda	51.5	8	15.9	2	13.6	2	6.5	1	3.6	-	5.5	-					13
Alcântara	53.7	8	18.8	3	9.3	1	5.3	-	6.2	1	3.8	-					13
Alvalade	28.6	6	33.2	7	8.6	2	6.4	1	6.4	1	4.2	1			5.0	1	19
Areeiro	25.9	4	42.6	7	7.7	1	5.8	-	7.0	1	4.6	-	3.4	-			13
Arroios	23.8	5	29.0	6	12.5	3	10.7	2	5.5	1	4.2	1	5.4	1	3.6	-	19
Avenidas Novas	26.8	5	43.0	9	6.9	1	5.8	1	9.1	2	4.8	1					19
Beato	39.5	6	18.2	3	13.0	2	9.4	1	2.5	-	7.5	1			5.8	-	13
Belém	24.2	4	46.4	7	6.6	1	4.0	-	8.6	1	4.8	-	2.6	-			13
Benfica	45.6	10	23.7	5	8.9	2	6.5	1	3.8	-	5.0	1	3.3	-			19
Campo de Ourique	34.3	5	34.0	5	8.8	1	7.5	1	6.4	1	4.8	-					13
Campolide	38.9	6	25.7	4	9.0	1	6.8	1	6.8	1	5.5	-	3.7	-			13
Carnide	18.2	3	20.1	3	45.5	7	3.3	-	3.5	-	3.8	-	2.1	-			13
Estrela	23.7	3	47.8	8	7.1	1	5.6	-	7.3	1	5.3	-					13
Lumiar	27.1	6	41.3	9	8.7	1	5.2	1	6.6	1	4.6	1	3.2	-			19
Marvila	48.5	11	13.7	3	11.7	2	6.9	1	2.4	-	9.2	2	2.4	-			19
Misericórdia	33.1	6	27.4	4	12.3	2	10.6	1	5.1	-	4.5	-	4.0	-			13
Olivais	34.7	8	24.9	5	13.8	3	8.0	1	3.4	-	6.8	1	4.5	1			19
Parque das Nações	34.4	5	35.8	6	7.4	1	4.2	-	8.0	1	4.4	-	2.8	-			13
Penha de França	37.0	8	20.6	4	13.5	3	11.2	2	3.8	-	5.3	1	4.5	1			19
Santa Clara	36.2	6	22.0	3	12.4	2	6.4	1	3.8	-	11.2	1					13
Santa Maria Maior	45.0	8	16.4	2	14.3	2	7.7	1	3.6	-	4.2	-	3.3	-	1.4	-	13
Santo António	23.6	3	44.6	7	8.1	1	7.4	1	6.7	1	3.4	-	3.4	-			13
São Domingos de Benfica	32.8	7	35.3	8	8.6	2	6.1	1	5.8	1	4.2	-	3.8	-			19
São Vicente	28.7	5	19.4	3	22.9	3	11.6	2	5.0	-	3.5	-	4.3	-			13
Total	33.3	146	30.5	123	11.5	47	6.8	21	5.5	14	5.2	11	2.8	3	0.7	1	366
Source: Election Results
