= Lino José Góis Ferreira =

President of the Lisbon Administrative Commission
- In office 18 December 1975 – 30 December 1976
- Preceded by: Joaquim Caldeira Rodrigues
- Succeeded by: Aquilino Ribeiro Machado (as mayor)

Personal details
- Born: 5 November 1936 (age 89) Funchal, Portugal
- Education: Higher Technical Institute; Military Academy
- Occupation: Military officer

Military service
- Allegiance: Portugal
- Branch/service: Portuguese Army
- Rank: Major general

Lino José Góis Ferreira (European Portuguese: [ˈli.nu ʒuˈzɛ ˈɡɔjʃ fɨˈʁɐj.ɾɐ]; born 5 November 1936) is a military officer in the Portuguese Army, with a rank of the major general. He was the President of the Lisbon Administrative Commission (city mayor) from 1975 to 1976.

== Biography ==
Lino José Góis Ferreira was born on 5 November 1936 in Funchal, Portugal. He has graduated in the civil and military engineering in 1960 from the Higher Technical Institute of the Technical University of Lisbon and the Military Academy.

He served in the Telecommunications Branch of the Portuguese Army. From 1962 to 1964, he was the Chief of the Military Telecommunications Service of the Independent Territorial Command of Guinea, the Chief of the Radiophonic Service of the Telegraph Battalion from 1966 to 1968, the Commander of the Independent Transmission Company of Guinea from 1968 to 1974, and the Commander of the 2nd Broadcasting Battalion of the Military Region of Mozambique.

Follwowing the Carnation Revolution in 1975, he was appointed by the Lisbon City Council as the President of the Lisbon Administrative Commission, being in the office from 18 December 1975 to 30 December 1976. From 1991 to 1992, then a brigadier, he was the Director of the Director of Communications and Information Systems of the Portuguese Army, the Chief of the Division of the Armed Forces General Staff, and acting director of the Telecommunications Arm. Currently he has the rank of major general.
