= Lisbon Municipal Chamber =

Legislative body of Lisbon

Coordinates: 38.70821°N 9.13854°W

Lisbon Municipal Chamber Câmara Municipal de Lisboa
- Coat of arms of the city of Lisbon

- Logo of the Câmara Municipal of Lisbon

Type
- Type: Câmara municipal
- Term limits: 3

History
- Founded: 1179; 847 years ago

Leadership
- President: Carlos Moedas, PSD since 20 October 2021
- Vice President: Gonçalo Reis, PSD since 11 November 2025

Structure
- Seats: 17
- Political groups: Municipal Executive (9) PSD (4) CDS-PP (2) IL (2) Ind. (1) Opposition (8) PS (4) CH (1) L (1) BE (1) PCP (1)
- Length of term: Four years

Elections
- Last election: 12 October 2025
- Next election: Sometime between 22 September and 14 October 2029

Meeting place
- Paços do Concelho de Lisboa

Website
- www.lisboa.pt

The Lisbon Municipal Chamber (Portuguese: Câmara Municipal de Lisboa) is the administrative authority in the municipality of Lisbon. It has 24 freguesias in its area of jurisdiction and is based in the city of Lisbon, on the Lisbon District. These freguesias are: Ajuda; Alcântara; Alvalade; Areeiro; Arroios; Avenidas Novas; Beato; Belém; Benfica; Campo de Ourique; Campolide; Carnide; Estrela; Lumiar; Marvila; Misericórdia; Olivais; Parque das Nações; Penha de França; Santa Clara; Santa Maria Maior; Santo António; São Domingos de Benfica and São Vicente.

The Lisbon City Council is the largest in the country and is made up of 17 councillors, representing, currently, four different political forces. The first candidate on the list with the most votes in a municipal election or, in the event of a vacancy, the next candidate on the list, takes office as President of the Municipal Chamber.

== City Hall building ==
Lisbon City Hall is housed in the Lisbon City Hall building, located in Praça do Município. The building follows the neoclassical style and its interior includes rich decoration, a main staircase, several rooms and a noble hall. It was on the balcony of the Lisbon Town Hall that the First Portuguese Republic was proclaimed on 5 October 1910.

== Members of the City Council ==
This is a list of members of the Lisbon City Council for the 2025–2029 term.

City Councillor	Party
Carlos Moedas	PSD
Gonçalo Reis	PSD
Joana Baptista	PSD
Rodrigo Mello Gonçalves	IL
Diogo Moura	CDS–PP
Maria Luísa Aldim	CDS–PP
Vasco Moreira Rato	PSD
Vasco Anjos	IL
Alexandra Leitão	PS
Sérgio Cintra	PS
Carla Madeira	PS
Pedro Anastácio	PS
Carlos Teixeira	LIVRE
Carolina Serrão	BE
Bruno Mascarenhas	CH
Ana Simões Silva	CH (until 2026); Ind. (since 2026)
João Ferreira	PCP

=== Previous compositions ===
Election	Mayor	Executive	Opposition
1976	Aquilino Ribeiro Machado	PS (7)	PCP (4); CDS (3); PPD (3)
1979	Nuno Krus Abecasis	CDS (5); PSD (4)	PCP (4); PS (4)
1982	Nuno Krus Abecasis	CDS (4); PSD (3)	PS (5); PCP (5)
1985	Nuno Krus Abecasis	PSD (8); PPM (1)	PCP (5); PS (3)
1989	Jorge Sampaio	PS (5); PCP (4); PPM (1)	PSD (4); CDS (3)
1993	Jorge Sampaio (1993–1995); João Soares (1995–1997)	PS (6); PCP (5)	PSD (5); CDS–PP (1)
1997	João Soares	PS (5); PCP (5)	PSD (6); CDS–PP (1)
2001	Pedro Santana Lopes (2001–2004); Carmona Rodrigues (2004–2005); Pedro Santana Lopes (2005)	PSD (8)	PS (4); PCP (4); CDS–PP (1)
2005	Carmona Rodrigues	PSD (8); CDS–PP (1)	PS (5); PCP (2); BE (1)
2007	António Costa	PS (6); CPL (2); BE (1)	LCC (3); PSD (3); PCP (1)
2009	António Costa	PS (9)	PSD (6); CDS–PP (1); PCP (1)
2013	António Costa (2013–2015); Fernando Medina (2015–2017)	PS (11)	PSD (3); PCP (2); CDS–PP (1)
2017	Fernando Medina	PS (8); BE (1)	CDS–PP (4); PSD (2); PCP (2)
2021	Carlos Moedas	PSD (4); CDS–PP (3)	PS (6); PCP (2); L (1); BE (1)
2025	Carlos Moedas	PSD (4); CDS–PP (2); IL (2)	PS (4); CH (2); L (1); BE (1); PCP (1)
