= 2013 Lisbon local election =

2013 Lisbon local elections
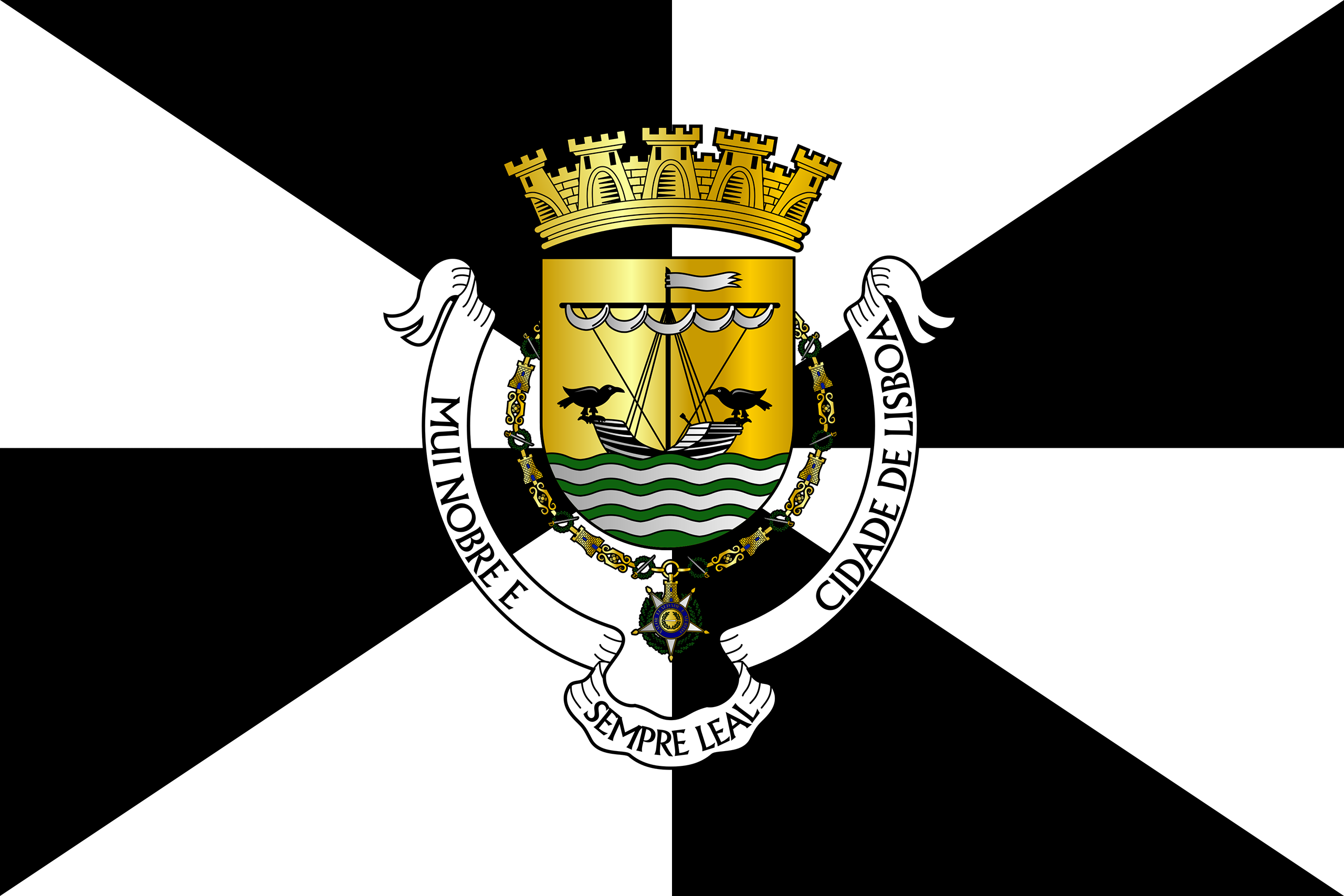
- 29 September 2013

All 17 Councillors in the Lisbon City Council 9 seats needed for a majority
- Opinion polls
- Turnout: 45.1% ▼8.4 pp
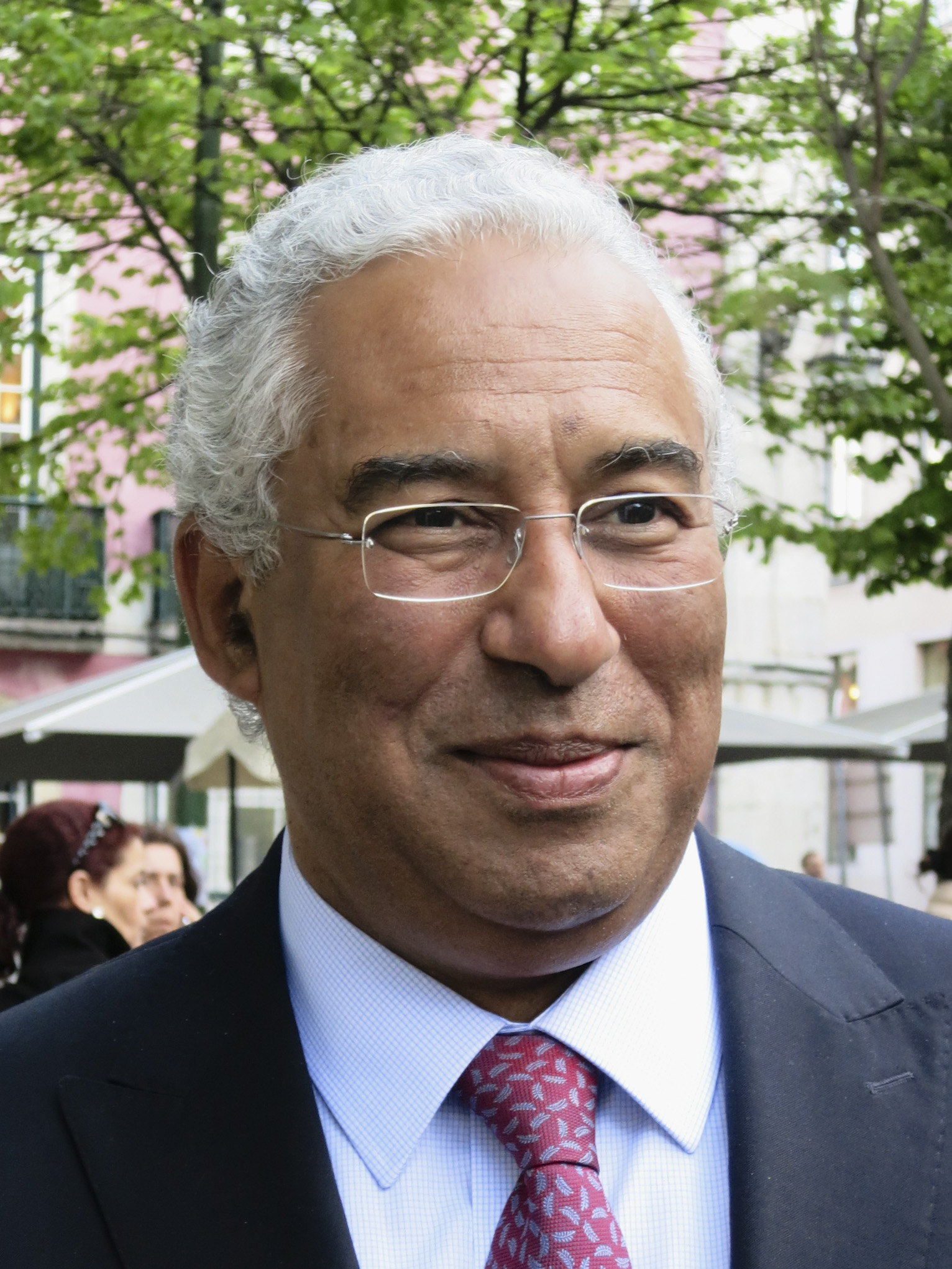

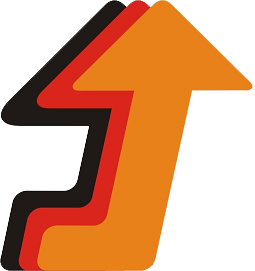

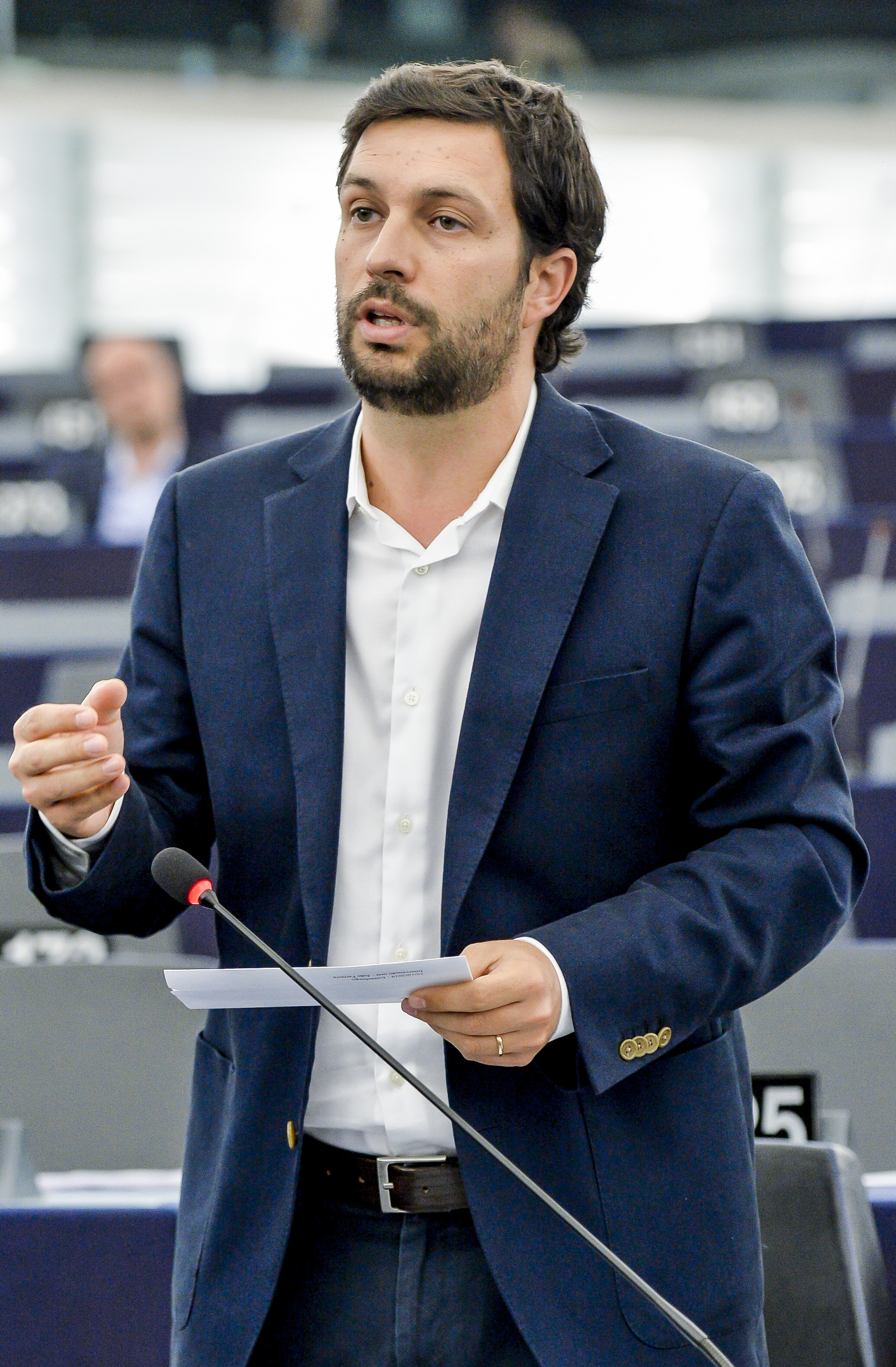

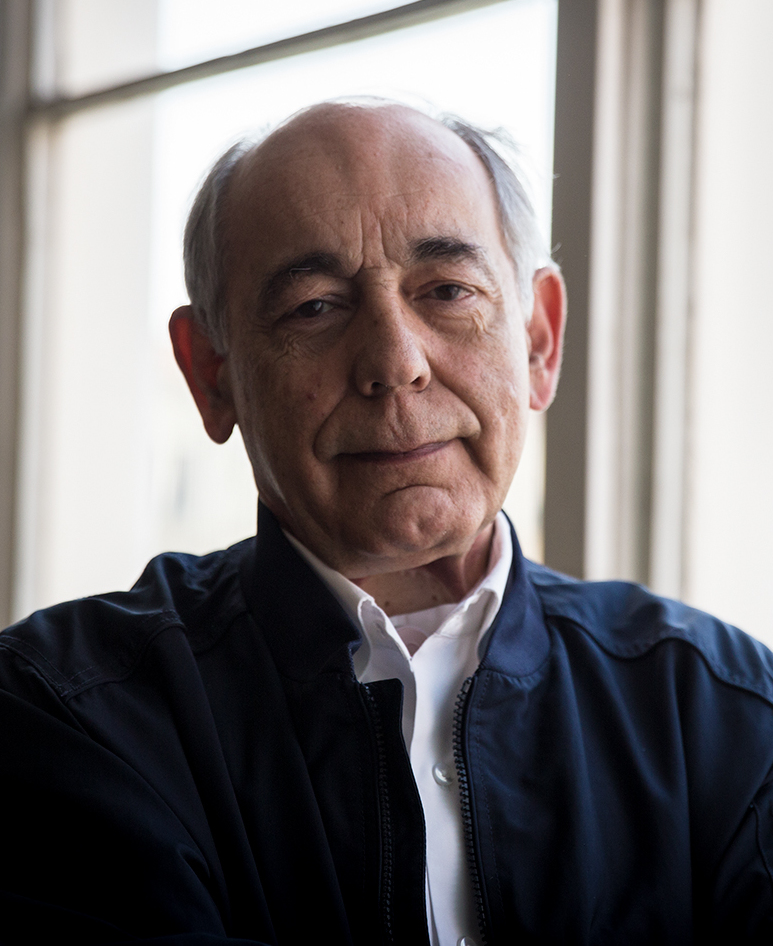
	First party	Second party
Leader	António Costa	Fernando Seara
Party	PS	PSD
Alliance		Feel Lisbon (Note: Coalition with PSD, CDS–PP and MPT.)
Last election	9 seats, 44.0%	7 seats, 38.7%
Seats won	11	4
Seat change	▲2	▼3
Popular vote	116,425	51,156
Percentage	50.9%	22.4%
Swing	▲6.9 pp	▼16.3 pp
	Third party	Fourth party
Leader	João Ferreira	João Semedo
Party	PCP	BE
Alliance	CDU
Last election	1 seats, 8.1%	0 seats, 4.6%
Seats won	2	0
Seat change	▲1	Steady
Popular vote	22,519	10,533
Percentage	9.9%	4.6%
Swing	▲1.8 pp	0.0 pp
Valid votes per parish
António Costa (PS)
40-49%
50-59%
60-69%
Mayor before election
António Costa
PS
Elected Mayor
António Costa
PS

The 2013 Lisbon local election was held on 29 September 2013 to elect the members of the Lisbon City Council.

Against a weak opposition, António Costa, mayor since 2007, was elected for a full second term, defeating Fernando Seara, by then incumbent and term limited mayor of Sintra, of the Feel Lisbon coalition between the Social Democratic Party (PSD), CDS–People's Party (CDS–PP) and Earth Party (MPT) by a landslide, 51 to 22 percent. Seara's candidacy was surrounded in controversy due to the recent changes in the law that established term limits for mayors. This law prohibits a candidate, after having served for three terms, to run for Mayor, Municipal Assemblies or Parish Assemblies. But the law did not explicitly state whether it prohibits reelection only for the same municipality or parish, or for the same position in any municipality or parish. This matter was only resolved on 5 September 2013 with a ruling of the Constitutional Court allowing mayoral candidates that had already served three consecutive mandates to run for election in a different municipality.

The Unitary Democratic Coalition presented incumbent MEP João Ferreira as their mayoral candidate and won nearly 10 percent of the votes and gained one seat, electing two in total. The Left Bloc, presented João Semedo as candidate for Mayor, but failed to win a seat.

Turnout was the second lowest ever, just 45.1 percent casting a ballot, surpassed only by the 2007 numbers.

== Background ==
In the 2009 election, the Socialist Party led by António Costa, won an absolute majority with 44 percent of the votes and 9 councillors, defeating former Lisbon mayor and Prime Minister Pedro Santana Lopes that gathered nearly 39 percent of the votes and 7 councillors.

== Electoral system ==
Each party or coalition must present a list of candidates. The winner of the most voted list for the municipal council is automatically elected mayor, similar to first-past-the-post (FPTP). The lists are closed and the seats in each municipality are apportioned according to the D'Hondt method. Unlike in national legislative elections, independent lists are allowed to run.

== Parties and candidates ==
Party/Coalition		Political position	Candidate	2009 result	
Party/Coalition		Political position	Candidate	Votes (%)	Seats
PS	Socialist Party; Partido Socialista	Centre-left	António Costa	44.0%	9 / 17
SL	Feel Lisbon; Sentir Lisboa PPD/PSD, CDS–PP, MPT	Centre-right	Fernando Seara	38.7%	7 / 17
CDU	Unitary Democratic Coalition; Coligação Democrática Unitária PCP, PEV	Left-wing to far-left	João Ferreira	8.1%	1 / 17
BE	Left Bloc; Bloco de Esquerda	Left-wing to far-left	João Semedo	4.6%	0 / 17
PCTP	Portuguese Workers' Communist Party; Partido Comunista dos Trabalhadores Portugueses	Far-left	Joana Miranda	0.7%	0 / 17
PNR	National Renovator Party; Partido Nacional Renovador	Far-right	João Patrocínio	0.3%	0 / 17
PTP	Portuguese Labour Party; Partido Trabalhista Português	Centre-left	Amândio Madaleno	—N/a	—N/a
PC	Citizen's Platform; Plataforma Cidadania PPM, PPV, PND	Right-wing	José Jorge Andrade	—N/a	—N/a
PAN	Party for Animals and Nature; Partido dos Animais e Natureza	Centre-left	Paulo Borges	—N/a	—N/a

== Opinion polling ==
Exit poll

Polling firm/Link	Fieldwork date	Sample size	PS	PSD CDS MPT	CDU	BE	O	Lead
2013 local election	29 Sep 2013	—N/a	50.9; 11	22.4; 4	9.9; 1	4.6; 0	12.2; 0	28.5
UCP–CESOP	29 Sep 2013	9,663	51– 55; 10/11	21– 24; 4	9– 12; 1/2	4– 6; 0/1	–	30– 31
Eurosondagem	29 Sep 2013	7,597	52.0– 56.2; 10/11	21.2– 25.0; 4/5	8.7– 11.5; 1/2	4.8– 7.0; 0/1	–	30.8– 31.2
Aximage	23–27 Sep 2013	605	49.5	31.7	7.9	6.7	4.2	17.8
UCP–CESOP	21–23 Sep 2013	1,223	48; 9/10	26; 5	11; 1/2	7; 1	8; 0	22
Eurosondagem	8–10 Sep 2013	825	50.0; 9/10	26.9; 5	11.0; 1/2	6.6; 1	5.5; 0	23.1
Eurosondagem	4–5 Aug 2013	707	50.5; 9/10	29.5; 5/6	8.8; 1	6.3; 1	4.9; 0	21.0
Eurosondagem	15–16 Jul 2013	825	52.5; 9/10	27.5; 5/6	9.0; 1	6.9; 0/1	4.1; 0	25.0
Sociologest	14–18 Jun 2013	600	57.5	20.1	9.9	3.5	8.9	37.4
Eurosondagem	16–19 May 2013	811	52.1; 9/10	30.0; 5/6	8.6; 1	5.3; 0/1	4.0; 0	22.1
Sociologest	6–11 May 2013	600	49.7	33.8	6.7	5.7	5.1	15.9
2011 legislative election	5 Jun 2011	—N/a	26.6 (5)	51.2 (10)	8.3 (1)	5.6 (1)	8.3 (0)	24.6
2009 local election	11 Oct 2009	—N/a	44.0; 9	38.7; 7	8.1; 1	4.6; 0	4.6; 0	5.3

== Results ==
=== Municipal Council ===
Summary of the 29 September 2013 Lisbon City Council elections results
Graph of the party split among 17 seats.
Parties	Votes	%	±pp swing	Councillors	
Parties	Votes	%	±pp swing	Total	±
Socialist	116,425	50.91	▲6.9	11	▲2
PSD / CDS–PP / MPT	51,156	22.37	▼16.3	4	▼3
Unitary Democratic Coalition	22,519	9.85	▲1.8	2	▲1
Left Bloc	10,533	4.61	▲0.0	0	0
Party for Animals and Nature	5,227	2.29	—N/a	0	—N/a
PPM / PPV / PND	2,814	1.23	—N/a	0	—N/a
Portuguese Workers' Communist	2,378	1.04	▲0.3	0	0
National Renovator	1,182	0.52	▲0.2	0	0
Labour	656	0.29	—N/a	0	—N/a
Total valid	212,890	93.10	▼4.3	17	0
Blank ballots	9,241	4.04	▲2.5		
Invalid ballots	6,551	2.86	▲1.8		
Total	228,682	100.00			
Registered voters/turnout	507,495	45.06	▼8.3		
Source: Lisbon 2013 election results

=== Municipal Assembly ===
Summary of the 29 September 2013 Lisbon City Council elections results
Graph of the party split among 51 seats.
Parties	Votes	%	±pp swing	Seats	
Parties	Votes	%	±pp swing	Total	±
Socialist	97,114	42.34	▲3.0	25	▲2
PSD / CDS–PP / MPT	57,182	24.93	▼13.9	14	▼9
Unitary Democratic Coalition	27,257	11.88	▲1.9	7	▲2
Left Bloc	15,852	6.91	▲0.2	4	▲1
Party for Animals and Nature	6,827	2.98	—N/a	1	—N/a
PPM / PPV / PND	3,443	1.50	—N/a	0	—N/a
Portuguese Workers' Communist	2,841	1.24	▲0.3	0	0
National Renovator	1,326	0.52	▲0.2	0	0
Labour	778	0.34	—N/a	0	—N/a
Total valid	212,620	92.70	▼4.7	51	▼3
Blank ballots	9,951	4.34	▲2.7		
Invalid ballots	6,778	2.96	▲2.0		
Total	229,359	100.00			
Registered voters/turnout	507,495	45.19	▼8.2		
Source: Lisbon 2013 election results

=== Parish Assemblies ===
Results of the 29 September 2013 Lisbon Parish Assembly elections
Parish	%	S	%	S	%	S	%	S	%	S	%	S	Total S
Parish	PS		SL		CDU		BE		IND		PAN		Total S
Ajuda	50.7	8	11.2	1	25.8	1	5.3	-					13
Alcântara	33.6	5	26.5	4	19.5	3			10.1	1			13
Alvalade	37.0	8	34.9	8	10.0	2	5.6	1			3.5	-	19
Areeiro	35.4	5	37.1	6	9.2	1	6.8	1					13
Arroios	37.5	9	28.6	6	11.4	2	6.7	2			4.2	1	19
Avenidas Novas	33.5	8	34.5	8	8.1	1	5.3	1	7.8	1			19
Beato	64.1	10	12.7	2	10.6	1	4.7	2					13
Belém	32.3	5	42.8	7	9.1	1	4.6	-					13
Benfica	47.5	11	22.5	5	12.0	2	5.9	1					19
Campo de Ourique	41.4	9	29.8	7	12.1	2	6.7	1					19
Campolide	56.8	9	19.7	3	11.0	1	4.8	1					13
Carnide	23.8	4	16.6	2	46.1	7	3.6	-			2.1	-	13
Estrela	36.0	6	36.4	6	10.4	1	4.0	-	4.3	-			13
Lumiar	40.3	9	31.7	7	10.2	2	5.9	1					19
Marvila	44.8	11	15.3	3	18.7	4	6.4	1					19
Misericórdia	45.5	7	19.6	3	17.1	2	8.1	1					13
Olivais	43.4	12	17.3	3	13.3	3	5.0	1	9.7	2	2.4	-	19
Parque das Nações	28.8	4	12.8	2	7.0	1	3.1	-	40.9	6			13
Penha de França	43.5	9	21.8	5	14.1	3	6.9	1	5.4	1			19
Santa Clara	40.2	6	23.9	4	20.9	3	5.5	-					13
Santa Maria Maior	40.3	6	23.5	3	20.7	3	6.2	1					13
Santo António	33.8	5	41.8	6	10.5	1	6.8	1					13
São Domingos de Benfica	38.8	9	32.5	7	11.2	2	5.9	1					19
São Vicente	33.9	5	26.4	4	22.0	3	7.9	1					13
Total	40.1	178	26.2	112	14.3	55	5.6	15	3.0	11	0.9	1	372
Source: Election Results

== Maps ==
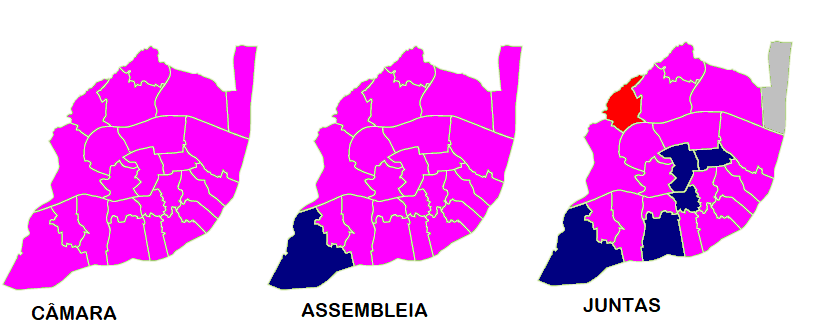
Most voted party by Parish.
