= List of mayors of Lisbon =

This is a list of mayors of Lisbon (Portuguese: Presidente da Câmara Municipal de Lisboa, CML, literally: "President of the Municipal Chamber of Lisbon", and also Portuguese: Presidente do Município de Lisboa, literally: "President of the Municipality of Lisbon"), the capital city of Portugal, and also the most populated.

This office is considered one of the most important in Portugal's politics, even more sought than the office of minister (following António Costa's resignation from a ministerial position to contest the 2007 elections, which he won). Of the nine elected mayors since 1976, two became Prime Minister of Portugal - Pedro Santana Lopes in 2004 and António Costa in 2015; One became President of the Republic - Jorge Sampaio in 1996.

== Mayors of Lisbon ==
Portrait	Prime minister (Lifespan)	Term of office			Election	Party
Portrait	Prime minister (Lifespan)	Start	End	Duration	Election	Party
Constitutional Monarchy – Second Liberalism (1834–1910)
	Luís Melo da Silva Breyner (1801–1865)	1840	1840	~1 year	—	Independent
	Joaquim Bonifácio (1801–1865)	1840	1840	~1 year	—	Independent
	José Lourenço Gomes (1800–1882)	1840	1842	~2 years	—	Independent
	Joaquim Bandeira (1796–1856)	1843	1845	~2 years	—	Independent
	Luís de Moura Cabral (1763–1847)	1846	1847	~1 year	—	Independent
	Augusto Silva (1XXX–1XXX)	1847	1847	~1 year	—	Independent
	Gonçalo Vaz de Carvalho (1779–1869)	November; 1847	2 January 1849	~2 years	—	Independent
	Nuno Pereira Bastos (1XXX–1XXX)	1850	1852	~2 years	—	Independent
	Alberto Carvalho (1801–1878)	1852	1853	~1 year	—	Independent
	Manuel Damasceno Monteiro (1818–1890)	1854	1858	~4 years	—	Independent
	Júlio de Oliveira Pimentel (1809–1884)	1858	1859	~1 year	—	Independent
	João de Saldanha Juzarte Figueira e Sousa (1811–1872)	1859	1860	~1 year	—	Independent
	António Esteves de Carvalho (1818–1864)	1860	4 August 1864	~4 years	—	Independent
	Manuel Almeida (1803–1873)	1864	2 January 1866	~2 years	—	Independent
	António de Melo Breyner Teles da Silva (1806–1894)	2 January 1866	5 March 1868	2 years, 62 days	—	Independent
	Luís de Carvalho Daun e Lorena (1828–1894)	5 March 1868	2 January 1870	1 year, 303 days	—	Progressist
	António José de Saldanha Sousa (1836–1892)	2 January 1870	1871	~1 year	—	Independent
	Francisco Mendonça (1830–1882)	1872	1875	~3 years	—	Independent
	Luís Almeida e Albuquerque (1819–1906)	1876	1877	~1 year	—	Independent
	António José de Saldanha Sousa (1836–1892)	23 June 1877	1 August 1877	39 days	—	Independent
	Luís de Carvalho Daun e Lorena (1828–1894)	1 August 1877	2 January 1878	154 days	—	Progressist
	José Elias Garcia (1830–1891)	2 January 1878	18 August 1878	1 year, 303 days	—	Reformist
	José da Rosa Araújo (1840–1893)	18 August 1878	2 January 1886	7 years, 137 days	—	Independent
	Fernando Osório Cabral (1850–1897)	2 January 1886	10 March 1890	4 years, 68 days	—	Regenerator
	Simões Margiochi (1848–1904)	11 March 1890	4 November 1890	238 days	—	Regenerator
	Pedro Morais Sarmento (1829–1903)	4 November 1890	8 August 1891	277 days	—	Independent
	Manuel Ottolini (1840–1898)	10 August 1891	2 January 1894	2 years, 145 days	—	Independent
	Pedro Augusto Franco (1833–1902)	2 January 1894	15 February 1897	3 years, 44 days	—	Progressist
	Zófimo Pedroso (1851–1910)	15 February 1897	1 January 1899	1 year, 321 days	—	Republican
	Pedro Augusto Franco (1833–1902)	1 January 1899	11 September 1901	2 years, 192 days	—	Progressist
	António José de Ávila (1842–1917)	11 September 1901	1902	~1 year	—	Independent
	António Castelo Branco (1842–1916)	1904	1907	~3 years	—	Independent
	Teodoro Basto (1839–1920)	3 January 1907	6 June 1907	154 days	—	Independent
	José de Melo e Sousa (1858–1925)	8 June 1907	17 February 1908	254 days	—	Regenerator
	António Castelo Branco (1842–1916)	1908	1908	~1 year	—	Independent
First Republic (1910–1926)
	Anselmo Braamcamp Freire (1849–1921)	27 October 1910	1 February 1913	2 years, 97 days	—	Republican
	António Xavier Correia Barreto (1853–1939)	6 February 1913	2 January 1914	330 days	—	Democratic
	João Catanho de Menezes (1854–1942)	2 January 1914	18 April 1914	107 days	—	Democratic
	Eduardo Basto (1875–1942)	18 April 1914	12 December 1914	238 days	—	Independent
	Henrique Vilhena (1879–1958)	2 January 1915	1 November 1915	238 days	—	Independent
	João Carlos Costa Gomes (1868–1929)	1 November 1915	2 January 1918	2 years, 62 days	—	Independent
	Alfredo Gaspar (1865–1938)	2 January 1918	14 January 1918	12 days	—	Democratic
	José Carlos da Maia (1878–1921)	14 January 1918	9 March 1918	54 days	—	National Republican
	Zeferino Falcão Pacheco (1856–1924)	15 March 1918	27 June 1918	104 days	—	National Republican
	José Castro (1870–1954)	June; 1918	February; 1919	~1 year	—	Independent
	Alberto Ferreira Vidal (1871–1967)	7 March 1919	16 June 1919	101 days	—	Independent
	Alfredo Gaspar (1865–1938)	16 June 1919	2 January 1920	200 days	—	Democratic
	Agostinho Estrela (1867–1952)	2 January 1920	3 April 1923	3 years, 91 days	—	Independent
	Albano Portugal Durão (1871–1925)	5 April 1923	13 November 1925	1 year, 222 days	—	Democratic
	Sebastião Santos (1881–1939)	23 November 1925	31 December 1925	38 days	—	Independent
	João Catanho de Menezes (1854–1942)	2 January 1926	2 July 1926	181 days	—	Democratic
Ditadura Nacional – Military Dictatorship (1926–1932)
	José Vicente de Freitas (1869–1952)	2 July 1926	31 December 1934	7 years, 181 days	—	Independent
	Eugénio Mardel Ferreira (1867–1947)	26 August 1927	15 August 1929	1 year, 354 days	—	Independent
Estado Novo – New State (1932–1974)
	Adriano da Costa Macedo (1870–1933)	17 February 1932	19 May 1932; 1932	91 days	—	Independent
	Henrique Linhares de Lima (1876–1953)	18 February 1934	31 December 1934	316 days	—	Independent
	Daniel Rodrigues de Sousa (1867–1958)	31 December 1934	31 December 1937	3 years	—	Independent
	Duarte Pacheco (1900–1943)	3 January 1938	16 November 1943	5 years, 317 days	—	National Union
	Eduardo Carvalho (1891–1970)	25 March 1938	4 March 1944	5 years, 344 days	—	Independent
	Álvaro Salvação Barreto (1890–1975)	6 March 1944	28 March 1959	15 years, 22 days	—	National Union
	António Vitorino Borges (1901–1986)	30 March 1959	28 February 1970	10 years, 334 days	—	National Union
	Fernando Santos e Castro (1922–1983)	11 March 1970	20 October 1972	2 years, 223 days	—	Independent
	António Silva Sebastião (1919–2005)	27 October 1972	7 May 1974	1 year, 192 days	—	Independent
Third Republic (1974–present)
	João Lopes da Conceição (1927–)	7 May 1974	2 September 1974	118 days	—	Independent
	Joaquim Caldeira Rodrigues (1925–2004)	2 September 1974	19 November 1975	1 year, 78 days	—	Independent
	Lino Góis Ferreira (1936–)	18 December 1975	30 December 1976	1 year, 12 days	—	Independent
	Aquilino Ribeiro Machado (1930–2012)	4 January 1977	8 January 1980	3 years, 4 days	1976	Socialist
	Nuno Krus Abecasis (1929–1999)	8 January 1980	22 January 1990	10 years, 14 days	1979	Democratic Social Center (Note: Abecasis contested the 1985 local election in the Social Democratic Party lists, as part of a coalition agreement between the CDS and the PSD.)
	Nuno Krus Abecasis (1929–1999)	8 January 1980	22 January 1990	10 years, 14 days	1982	Democratic Social Center
	Nuno Krus Abecasis (1929–1999)	8 January 1980	22 January 1990	10 years, 14 days	1985	Democratic Social Center
	Jorge Sampaio (1939–2021)	22 January 1990	15 November 1995	5 years, 297 days	1989	Socialist
	Jorge Sampaio (1939–2021)	22 January 1990	15 November 1995	5 years, 297 days	1993	Socialist
	João Soares (1949–)	15 November 1995	23 January 2002	6 years, 296 days	—	Socialist
	João Soares (1949–)	15 November 1995	23 January 2002	6 years, 296 days	1997	Socialist
	Pedro Santana Lopes (1956–)	23 January 2002	17 July 2004	2 years, 176 days	2001	Social Democratic
	Carmona Rodrigues (1956–)	17 July 2004	14 March 2005	240 days	—	Social Democratic
	Pedro Santana Lopes (1956–)	14 March 2005	28 October 2005	228 days	—	Social Democratic
	Carmona Rodrigues (1956–)	28 October 2005	17 May 2007	1 year, 201 days	2005	Social Democratic
	Marina Ferreira (1959–)	18 May 2007	31 July 2007	74 days	—	Social Democratic
	António Costa (1961–)	1 August 2007	6 April 2015	7 years, 248 days	2007	Socialist
	António Costa (1961–)	1 August 2007	6 April 2015	7 years, 248 days	2009	Socialist
	António Costa (1961–)	1 August 2007	6 April 2015	7 years, 248 days	2013	Socialist
	Fernando Medina (1973–)	6 April 2015	18 October 2021	6 years, 195 days	—	Socialist
	Fernando Medina (1973–)	6 April 2015	18 October 2021	6 years, 195 days	2017	Socialist
	Carlos Moedas (1970–)	18 October 2021	Incumbent	4 years, 293 days	2021	Social Democratic
	Carlos Moedas (1970–)	18 October 2021	Incumbent	4 years, 293 days	2025	Social Democratic

== See also ==
- Lisbon City Hall
- Lisbon history and timeline
- Local elections in Portugal
