= Nuno Krus Abecasis =

Portuguese politician (1924–1999)

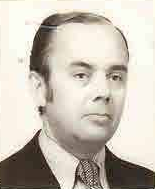

Mayor of Lisbon
- In office 1979–1989
- Preceded by: Aquilino Ribeiro Machado
- Succeeded by: Jorge Sampaio

Vice President of the Assembly of the Republic
- In office November 1998 – 14 April 1999

Personal details
- Born: 24 October 1924 Faro, Portugal
- Died: 14 April 1999 (aged 74) Lisbon, Portugal
- Party: CDS–PP
- Education: Instituto Superior Técnico
- Occupation: Engineer, politician

Nuno Krus Abecasis (24 October 1924 – 14 April 1999) was a Portuguese politician who served as Mayor of Lisbon from 1979 until 1989.

== Biography ==
Abecasis was born in Faro in 1924. He studied engineering in Instituto Superior Técnico. During his youth he was a member of the Portuguese Catholic Action, a Catholic organization founded by Cardinal Manuel Cerejeira, close friend of António de Oliveira Salazar.

After the Carnation Revolution, he first joined the Christian Democratic Party, joining later the Democratic and Social Center. He became a Member of the Assembly of the Republic after being elected in 1976. He was the Secretary of State for Industries between February and August 1978.

In 1979, he was the Democratic Alliance's candidate for Mayor of Lisbon. He defeated incumbent Socialist Mayor Aquilino Ribeiro Machado with 46.7% of the votes, winning an absolute majority of the seats. He was later reelected in 1982 with 41.3% of the votes, losing his majority. In 1985, after the end of the AD, he was the candidate of the CDS/PSD coalition, running under the banner of the Social Democratic Party, while the Social Democrat Fernando Correia Afonso ran for the Municipal Assembly in a CDS list. He won the election with 44.8%, governing with the People's Monarchist Party.

After the 1995 legislative election, he was nominated as the CDS–PP candidate for Vice President of the Assembly of the Republic. For the first time in democracy, his name was rejected three times due to the other parties boycott to the leadership of Manuel Monteiro. After Monteiro left office, he was finally elected as vice president in November 1998, being in office for a short period until his death on 14 April 1999.
