= Lisbon City Hall =

Building in Lisbon, Portugal

Coordinates: 38.7082°N 9.1386°W

Lisbon City Hall

The Lisbon City Hall (Portuguese: Paços do Concelho de Lisboa, lit. 'Palace of the Municipality of Lisbon') is the seat of the Lisbon municipal government. The building is located in the City Square (Praça do Município), Santa Maria Maior, Lisbon. It houses the Lisbon City Council. Built in the neoclassical style, its monumental façade features a large pediment over a central balcony with sculptures by Calmels, and four oculi. Inside, it has a remarkable central staircase, by the architect José Luís Monteiro, and paintings by several artists, like Pereira Cão, Columbano Bordalo Pinheiro, José Malhoa e José Rodrigues.

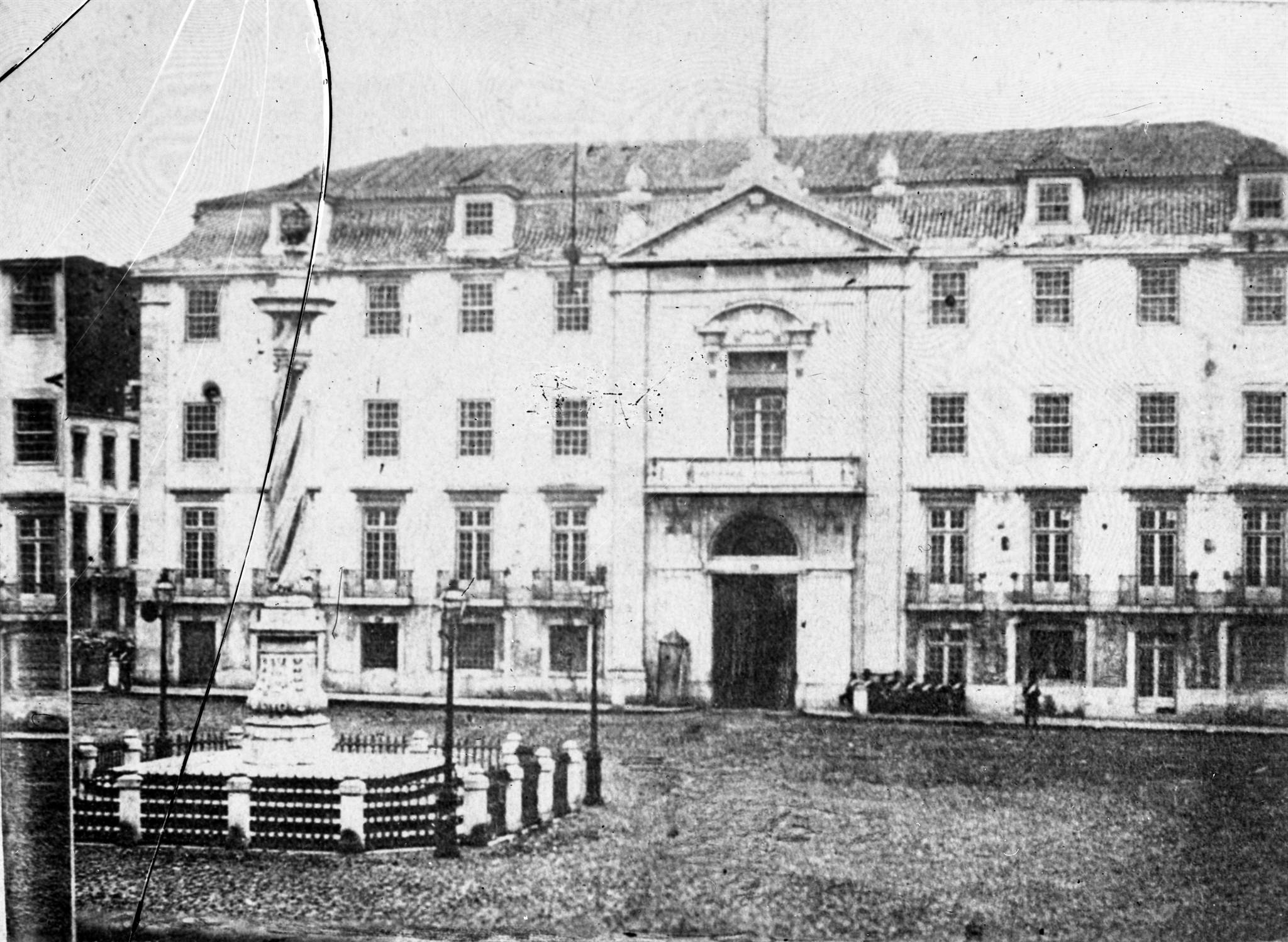
The original City Hall building, before the 1863 fire

The original city hall was built following plans by Eugénio dos Santos, during the reconstruction of the Baixa neighbourhood that followed the 1755 earthquake. On 19 November 1863, a fire completely razed the building. A new City Hall was built in the same location, with plans drawn by architect Domingos Parente da Silva, between 1865 and 1880.

Since the 1930s and 1940s, the building had seen successive architectural additions, to the point where even a new floor was added over the rooftop. A new fire, on 7 November 1996, damaged the upper floors and the ornate painted ceilings of the first floor. Architect Silva Dias conducted an intervention plan to recover the building, and to bring it closer to Domingos Parente da Silva's initial plans.

== See also ==
- List of mayors of Lisbon
