= Teodoro Pinto Basto =

Portuguese politician

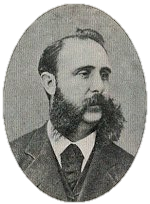
- Pinto Basto before 1910
- Born: Teodoro Ferreira Pinto Basto; 8 November 1839; London, England
- Died: 14 March 1920 (aged 80); Lisbon, Portugal
- Citizenship: Portuguese
- Occupation: Politician
- Known for: Mayor of Lisbon

Mayor of Lisbon
- In office 1885–1885
- Preceded by: António de Azevedo Castelo Branco
- Succeeded by: José Adolfo de Melo e Sousa

Teodoro Ferreira Pinto Basto (8 November 1839 – 14 March 1920) was a Portuguese businessman and politician who served as a mayor of Lisbon from 3 January to 8 June 1907.

== Early and personal life ==
Teodoro Pinto Basto was born in London on 8 November 1839, as the son of Francisca Nicholson and a man of the same name, who was the representative in London of the Companhia das Vinhas do Alto Douro, one of the many flourishing businesses from which the family prospered. He had six brothers, Eduardo, Carlos, Enrique, Gustavo, Alberto, and Augusto José.

He married Beatriz Ferreira Pinto Allen in the early 1860s, and the couple had three children: João, Laura, and Sofia Ferreira Pinto Basto. In 1860, the 21-year-old Teodoro and his older brother Eduardo founded the E. Pinto Basto & Cª Lda., a society that went on to absorb the businesses of their ancestors, most notably the John Hall & Co., the União Mercantil, and the Pacific Steam Navigation Company. Through Eduardo, he was the uncle of Guilherme, Eduardo and Frederico, the three Pinto Basto brothers who introduced the sport of football to mainland Portugal and organized the first football match in Portugal in 1889. The eldest, Guilherme, also played tennis, an activity that he combined with his work at the E. Pinto Basto & Cª Lda., then owned by Guilherme's father and by his uncle Teodoro. However, football and tennis were not the only English habits "imported" by the Pinto Basto family, since they also promoted horse racing and even founded Clube Equestre, which was presided by his father at some point before he died in 1884.

== Politic career ==
In 1878, Pinto Basto and two relatives were involved in an ordinary action at the Judicial Court of the District of Lisbon. In November 1895, the 56-year-old Pinto Basto narrowly won the Lisbon elections which elected fourteen deputies to the 1896–97 Legislature, doing so with 24,514 votes against the 24,482 of the runner-up Jacinto José Maria do Couto.

At some point in the late 19th century and early 20th century, Pinto Basto held the presidency of the Lisbon Commercial Association, and also became a member of the Administrative Committee of the Lisbon City Council. He thus eventually rose to mayor of Lisbon, a position that he held for only five months, from 3 January to 8 June 1907. In August 1908, Pinto Basto was the vice-president of the Lisbon City Council. His name was sometimes misspelled as Theodoro.

== Death ==
Pinto Basto died in Lisbon on 14 March 1920, at the age of 80.
