= Joaquim Basto =

Portuguese sailor

Personal information
- Birth name: Joaquim António Vasco Leite Pereira de Melo Ferreira Pinto Basto
- National team: Portugal
- Born: 11 December 1932
- Died: 17 February 2008 (aged 75)

Joaquim António Vasco Leite Pereira de Melo Ferreira Pinto Basto (11 December 1932 – 17 February 2008) was a Portuguese sailor who competed in the 1960 Summer Olympics and in the 1964 Summer Olympics.
