= Carlos Moedas =

Portuguese politician (born 1970)

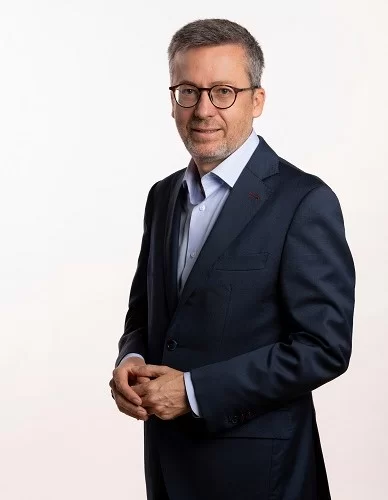
- Official portrait, 2023

Mayor of Lisbon
- Incumbent
- Assumed office 18 October 2021
- Deputy: Filipe Anacoreta Correia
- Preceded by: Fernando Medina

European Commissioner for Research, Science and Innovation
- In office 1 November 2014 – 30 November 2019
- Commission: Juncker
- Preceded by: Máire Geoghegan-Quinn
- Succeeded by: Mariya Gabriel

Secretary of State Assistant to the Prime Minister
- In office 21 June 2011 – 10 September 2014
- Prime Minister: Pedro Passos Coelho
- Preceded by: João Almeida Ribeiro
- Succeeded by: Mariana Vieira da Silva

Member of the Assembly of the Republic
- In office 20 June 2011 – 21 June 2011
- Constituency: Beja

Personal details
- Born: Carlos Manuel Félix Moedas; 10 August 1970 (age 56) Beja, Portugal
- Party: Social Democratic
- Spouse: Céline Dora Judith Abecassis Moedas (m. 2000)
- Children: 3
- Education: University of Lisbon; Harvard University

Carlos Manuel Félix Moedas (born 10 August 1970) is a Portuguese politician, civil engineer, and management graduate who has served as the mayor of Lisbon since 2021. He is a member of the Social Democratic Party (PSD).

From 2014 until 2019, Moedas served as European commissioner covering the portfolio of Research, Science and Innovation under the leadership of President Jean-Claude Juncker. Between 2011 and 2014 he served as Secretary of State in the XIX Constitutional Government of Portugal.

In March 2021, Moedas announced his candidacy as mayor of Lisbon in the 2021 local elections, and was elected on 26 September of the same year. Moedas won reelection to a second term in October 2025.

== Early life and education ==
Moedas was born to a communist journalist and a seamstress in Beja, Alentejo, southern Portugal, in 1970. He studied at Lisbon University, graduating in 1993 with a degree in Civil Engineering from the Instituto Superior Técnico. He spent his final year studying at the ENPC (Paris) via the Erasmus Programme. He was one of the first Portuguese students to undertake an Erasmus exchange.

== Professional career ==
After leaving university, Moedas worked as a project manager for the Suez Group in France between 1993 and 1998. He then took postgraduate studies at Harvard Business School, graduating in 2000 with the degree of MBA, after which he came back to Europe to work in mergers and acquisitions for Goldman Sachs. He then worked at Eurohypo Investment Bank in its Real Estate Investment Banking Division, before returning, in August 2004, to Portugal, when Moedas joined the real estate consulting company Aguirre Newman Portugal (now Savills Portugal) becoming Managing Partner until 2008, when he set up his own investment management company, Crimson Investment Management.

== Political career ==
Following the Eurozone crisis, Moedas was appointed coordinator of the Social Democratic Party (PSD) Economic Research Unit. He and Eduardo Catroga led PSD negotiations in the run-up to Portugal's 2011 State Budget, following which he was selected by PSD to contest the Beja constituency in the legislative elections held on the 5th of June 2011.

Moedas was elected to Parliament, becoming the first PSD Member of Parliament for that district since 1995. The day after entering Parliament, on 21 June 2011, the Prime Minister appointed him to his Cabinet in the XIX Constitutional Government as Secretary of State.

Moedas oversaw EASME (Executive Agency for Small and Medium-sized Enterprises), the agency created to monitor and control the implementation of the structural reforms agreed in the context of the assistance programme by a troika composed of the European Commission, European Central Bank and the International Monetary Fund.

In 2014, Pedro Passos Coelho, Prime Minister of Portugal, nominated him as European Commissioner, and Moedas' name was approved by EC President-elect Jean-Claude Juncker on 1 September. On 1 November 2014, Moedas became European Commissioner for Research, Science and Innovation.

In March 2021, Moedas announced his candidacy as Mayor of Lisbon in the 2021 local elections, and was elected on 26 September of the same year. He took office on 18 October 2021.

== Other activities ==
- European Council on Foreign Relations (ECFR), Member (since 2021)
- Aga Khan University, Member of the Chancellor’s Commission (since 2021)
- Africa Europe Foundation (AEF), Member of the High-Level Group of Personalities on Africa-Europe Relations (since 2020)
- Friends of Europe, Member of the Board of Trustees (since 2020)
- UNESCO, Member of the Advisory Board of the "Futures of Education" Initiative (since 2019)
- Jacques Delors Institute, Vice-President (since 2020), Member of the Board of Directors (since 2019)
- Re-Imagine Europa, Member of the Advisory Board

== Electoral history ==
=== Lisbon City Council election, 2021 ===
Ballot: 26 September 2021
Party	Candidate	Votes	%	Seats	+/−
PSD/CDS–PP/Alliance/MPT/PPM	Carlos Moedas	83,185	34.3	7	+1
PS/Livre	Fernando Medina	80,907	33.3	7	–1
CDU	João Ferreira	25,550	10.5	2	±0
BE	Beatriz Gomes Dias	15,057	6.2	1	±0
Chega	Nuno Graciano	10,730	4.4	0	new
IL	Bruno Horta Soares	10,213	4.2	0	new
PAN	Manuela Gonzaga	6,625	2.7	0	±0
Other parties		3,031	1.3	0	±0
Blank/Invalid ballots		7,445	3.1	–	–
Turnout		242,743	50.99	17	±0
Source: Autárquicas 2021

=== Lisbon City Council election, 2025 ===
Ballot: 12 October 2025
Party	Candidate	Votes	%	Seats	+/−
PSD/CDS–PP/IL	Carlos Moedas	110,586	41.7	8	+1
PS/Livre/BE/PAN	Alexandra Leitão	90,068	34.0	6	–2
Chega	Bruno Mascarenhas	26,780	10.1	2	+2
CDU	João Ferreira	26,769	10.1	1	–1
Other parties		4,291	1.6	0	±0
Blank/Invalid ballots		6,774	2.6	–	–
Turnout		265,268	57.22	17	±0
Source: Autárquicas 2025

== Honours and awards ==
- Member of the Portuguese Academy of Engineering (2014)
- Commander of the Spanish Order of Civil Merit by the King Felipe VI of Spain (2015)
- Honorary Doctorate in Laws by the University of Cork (2016)
- Honorary Doctorate by ESCP Europe - École supérieure de commerce de Paris (2018)
- Honorary Fellow of the AAS - African Academy of Sciences (2018)
- Gold Medal from the Portuguese Order of Engineering (2019)
- University of Coimbra Prize (2020)
- Honorary Doctorate by the Universidade Nova de Lisboa (2022)
- Honorary Doctorate by the West University of Timisoara (2022)
- Knight of the Pontifical Equestrian Order of Pope St Sylvester (2023)
- Grand Cross of the Order of Infante D. Henrique (2023)
- Distinguished Citizen of the City of Buenos Aires (2024)
- Civic Intervention Award from the Order of Engineers (2024)
- French Legion of Honor Award (2025)

== Publications ==
- Amaro, N. L., Moedas, C. 2011. O Novo Paradigma do Investimento Imobiliário: Análise e estratégias para um sector-chave da economia. Sabedoria Alternativa
- Bogers, M., Chesbrough, H., Moedas, C. 2018. Open Innovation: Research, Practices, and Policies. California Management Review, Volume: 60 issue: 2, page(s): 5-16
- Moedas, C. "Vento Suão: Portugal e a Europa", Guerra e Paz, Lisboa, 2020.

== See also ==
- XIX Constitutional Government of Portugal (in Portuguese)
- List of Parliament members in Portugal (in Portuguese)
- Petros Christodoulou
- Massimo Tononi

Political offices
Preceded by Fernando Medina	Mayor of Lisbon; 2021–present	Incumbent
Preceded by José Manuel Barroso	Portuguese European Commissioner; 2014–2019	Succeeded by Elisa Ferreira
Preceded by Máire Geoghegan-Quinn as European Commissioner for Research, Innovation and Science	European Commissioner for Research, Science and Innovation; 2014–2019	Succeeded by Mariya Gabriel as European Commissioner for Innovation, Research, Culture, Education and Youth
