= Beatriz Gomes Dias =

Portuguese politician of Bissau-Guinean origin

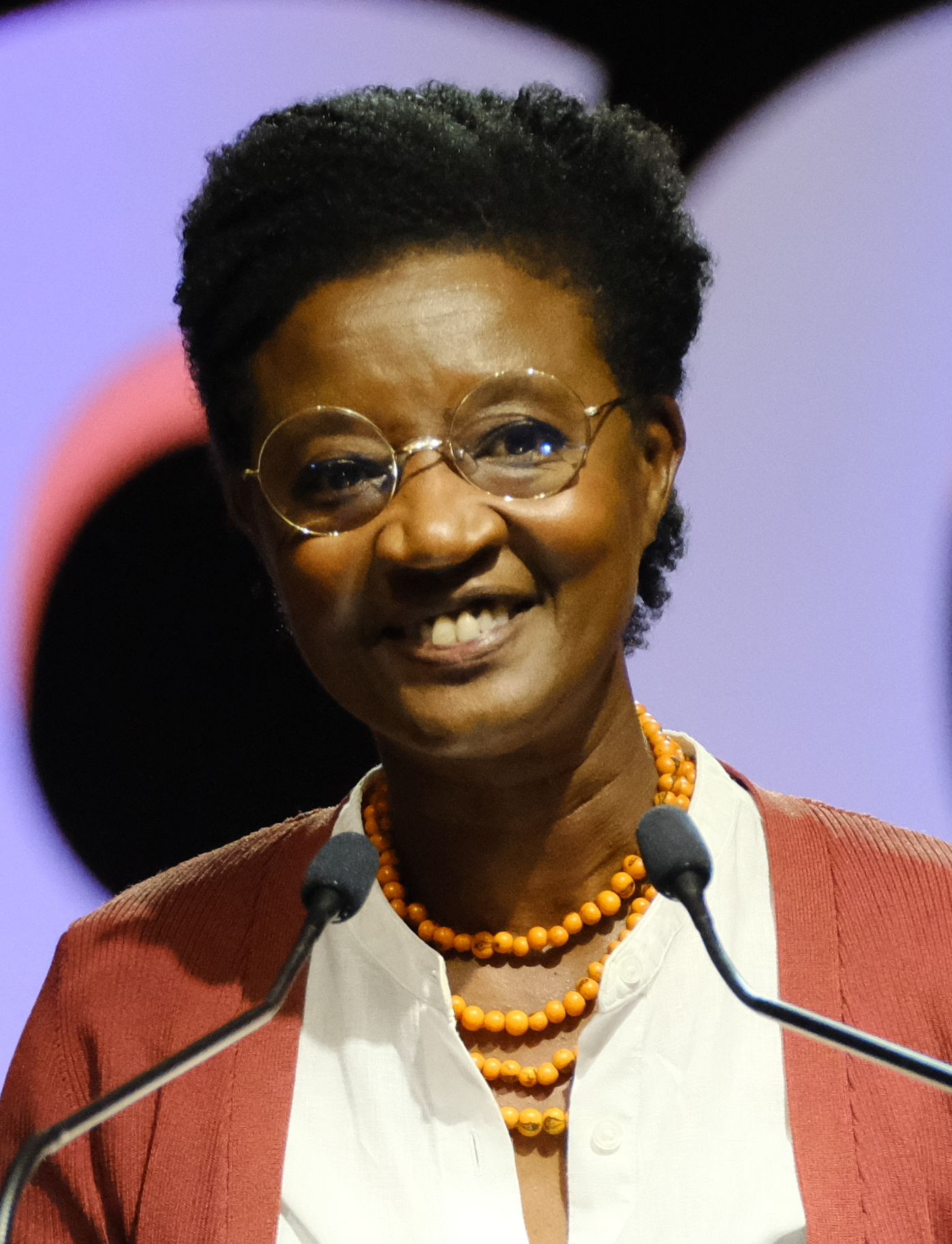

Member of the Assembly of the Republic
- In office 25 October 2019 – 30 March 2022
- Constituency: Lisbon

Member of the Lisbon City Council
- Incumbent
- Assumed office 18 October 2021

Personal details
- Born: Beatriz Gebalina Pereira Gomes Dias; 26 March 1971 (age 55) Dakar, Senegal
- Citizenship: Guinea-Bissau • Senegal • Portugal
- Party: Left Bloc
- Education: University of Coimbra
- Occupation: Teacher • Politician

Beatriz Gebalina Pereira Gomes Dias (born 26 March 1971) is a Portuguese teacher, activist and politician who was born in Senegal. She was elected as a deputy to the Assembly of the Republic of Portugal, representing the Left Bloc, in 2019, but was not re-elected in the 2022 election. In the 2021 local elections, she was elected member of the Lisbon City Council.

== Early life ==
Beatriz Gebalina Pereira Gomes Dias was born in Dakar, Senegal on 26 March 1971. Although born in Senegal, her ancestry is from Guinea-Bissau. She moved to Portugal with her parents when she was four, her father being a doctor, and they lived in the centre of the Portuguese capital of Lisbon. She has an undergraduate degree in biology from the Faculty of Sciences of the University of Coimbra and a master's degree in Science Communication from the Faculty of Social and Human Sciences of the NOVA University Lisbon. She then became a secondary school biology teacher.

== Anti-racism activism ==
As a university student she joined SOS Racismo in Portugal. In 2016 she founded and became president of the Associação de Afrodescendentes (Association of Afro-descendants). This association was responsible for proposing the winner of the competition for the Memorial of Homage to Enslaved People, in Lisbon.

== Political activities ==
Gomes Dias became a councillor in the Lisbon parish council of Arroios from 2013 to 2019, and then a member of the Lisbon Municipal Assembly from 2018. She was elected as a Deputy in the Assembly of the Republic in the 2019 legislative elections, representing the Bloco de Esquerda grouping, being one of three women of African and Guinea-Bissau origin to be elected to that Assembly, the others being Joacine Katar Moreira and Romualda Fernandes. In the Assembly she has concentrated her activities on combating racism, and on defending the rights of migrant people and their culture. In March 2021, it was announced that she would again be a candidate for the Bloco de Esquerda in the elections for the Lisbon Municipality. In the January 2022 national elections she was not re-elected, being 4th on the Left Bloc list of candidates for Lisbon, with only two candidates being elected.
