= Aquilino Ribeiro Machado =

Portuguese politician (1930–2012)

Aquilino Ribeiro Machado (6 April 1930 – 7 October 2012) was a Portuguese politician of the Socialist Party. He represented the Lisbon District in the Assembly of the Republic in its first two legislatures (1976–1983). He was the first democratically elected Mayor of Lisbon following the Carnation Revolution (1977–1980). He received the Order of Liberty on 1 October 1985.

A qualified engineer, he was the son of novelist Aquilino Ribeiro, and his maternal grandfather was former President of Portugal Bernardino Machado. He was born in Paris when his father fled after taking part in a revolt in 1928, and moved to Galicia, Spain before his first birthday, then lived in Portugal from 1932.

A park and allotment garden named after him opened in Lisbon in May 2017. There is also a street in his name near the city's Parque das Nações.
