= João Ferreira (politician) =

Portuguese biologist and politician

João Ferreira MEP
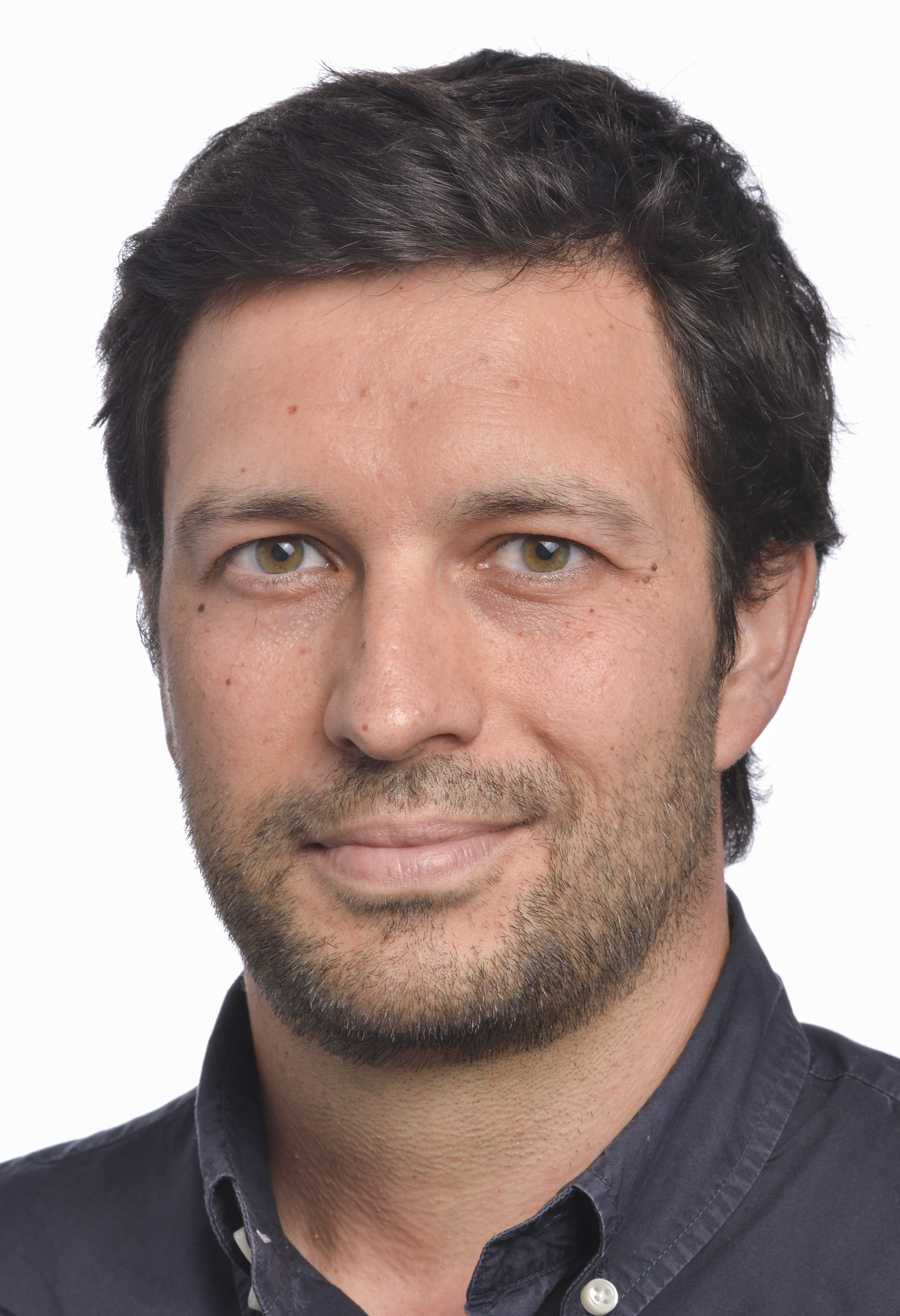
- Official portrait as an MEP, 2019

Member of the European Parliament
- In office 14 July 2009 – 5 July 2021
- Constituency: Portugal

Member of the Lisbon City Council
- Incumbent
- Assumed office 29 September 2013

Personal details
- Born: João Manuel Peixoto Ferreira; 20 November 1978 (age 47) Lisbon, Portugal
- Party: Portuguese Communist Party
- Occupation: Politician
- Profession: Biologist

João Manuel Peixoto Ferreira (Portuguese pronunciation: [ʒuˈɐ̃w̃ mɐnuˈɛl pɐjˈʃotu fɨˈʁejɾɐ]; born 20 November 1978) is a Portuguese biologist and politician, serving as Member of the European Parliament for the Portuguese Communist Party (PCP); part of the European United Left–Nordic Green Left, where he was a vice-chair from 7 February 2012 to 30 June 2014, since 2009.

João Ferreira is a member of the Central Committee of the Portuguese Communist Party, and a member of the Lisbon Municipal Council.
