= Luna Andermatt =

Portuguese ballet dancer, ballet teacher and choreographer

- Born: 1926; Lisbon, Portugal
- Died: 5 November 2013 Aged 87; Lisbon
- Occupations: Dancer and choreographer
- Known for: Founder of the National Ballet of Portugal

Luna Andermatt (1926—2013) was a pioneer in dance and in ballet training in Portugal and one of the founders of the National Ballet of Portugal.

== Early life ==
Maria Antónia Luna Andermatt was born in 1926. Her father was an army officer who died before his daughter was a month old. Her mother was a teacher of calligraphy at the Instituto de Odivelas in Lisbon, a military school for young girls, and was also one of the founders, in 1919, of the Association of the Former Students of the institute, the oldest association for women in Portugal. Andermatt initially went to a Convent school, where she lived with her mother, before herself enrolling at the institute, where her uncle was also a teacher. She then registered secretly at the Portuguese National Conservatory.

== Training and early career ==
Andermatt's ballet training started in Portugal, at the school of Margarida de Abreu. Receiving a scholarship from the Portuguese Estado Novo dictatorship's Institute of High Culture, she then moved on to the Royal Ballet School in London at the age of 24. She received invitations to join companies in France and England, but returned to Portugal because her mother lived alone. In Portugal, classical ballet dancing did not yet exist as a profession. Seeing the best dancers go abroad for lack of a company, she created the Centre for Ballet Studies at the Teatro Nacional de São Carlos, the major Lisbon opera house, and took training in London and Paris on teaching ballet. She had a clear idea that it was necessary to train professional dancers and create a national ballet company to put dance at the level of other arts in Portugal.

== Portuguese Ballet Company ==
Andermatt married Francisco de Assis Brás de Oliveira and they had three children, two girls and a boy. In 1976, Brás de Oliveira became a co-founder of the Lusíada University in Lisbon. Her second daughter, Clara Andermatt, followed her into ballet and became a noted dancer and choreographer in her own right. In 1961, Luna Andermatt and her husband founded the Companhia Portuguesa de Bailado (Portuguese Ballet Company). In the programme for the opening show at the Teatro Nacional de São Carlos, Brás de Oliveira, wrote: "To madness we want to give balance, to fear we want to give confidence and faith, to selfishness we counter with the gift of ourselves." But Government funds that had been allocated to support the dance company were diverted to support Portugal's colonial war in Angola and that and the country's unpreparedness for classical dance put an end to the project.

== National Ballet Company ==
Two years after the Carnation Revolution in 1974, which saw the overthrow of the Estado Novo, Andermatt was asked by the writer David Mourão Ferreira, then the Portuguese Secretary of State for Culture, to develop a National Ballet Company. Working with Armando Jorge, who became the Artistic Director, and others, she created the first ballet company in Portugal to produce full-length classical ballets. The company's first performance was in 1977 and she worked with it until 1984.

== Later life and death ==
After that she devoted herself to teaching, training many of Portugal's leading ballet dancers. In 2010 Andermatt joined Companhia Maior, a company set up in that year for performers over the age of 60. Performing in 2011 in a show called Maior, directed by her daughter Clara, she overcame her initial horror to dance barefoot for the first time in her life. Other activities included making two films on dance for the Portuguese state broadcaster Rádio e Televisão de Portugal (RTP). In 2013 she was awarded the Gold Medal of the City of Lisbon for her contribution to dance in Portugal as a dancer, choreographer and teacher.

Luna Andermatt died on 5 November 2013.
