= Opinion polling for the 2017 Portuguese local elections =

In the run up to the 2017 Portuguese local elections, various organisations carried out opinion polling to gauge voting intention in several municipalities across Portugal. Results of such polls are displayed in this article. The date range for these opinion polls are from the previous local elections, held on 29 September 2013, to the day the next elections were held, on 1 October 2017.

== Polling ==
=== Alcobaça ===
| Polling firm/Link | Fieldwork date | Sample size | PSD | PS | CDS | CDU | BE | O | Lead |
|---|---|---|---|---|---|---|---|---|---|
| 2017 local election | 1 Oct 2017 | —N/a | 44.0; 4 | 21.6; 2 | 15.3; 1 | 7.6; 0 | 3.0; 0 | 8.6; 0 | 22.4 |
| IPOM; Seat projection | 20–21 Sep 2017 | 714 | 44.4; 4 | 20.4; 1/2 | 14.7; 1 | 10.2; 0/1 | 2.6 – | 7.6 – | 24.0 |
| 2013 local election | 29 Sep 2013 | —N/a | 36.1; 3 | 19.8; 2 | 17.5; 2 | 12.0; 1 | 2.1; 0 | 12.5; 0 | 16.3 |

=== Aveiro ===
| Polling firm/Link | Fieldwork date | Sample size | PSD CDS PPM | PS | IND | BE | CDU | O | Lead |
|---|---|---|---|---|---|---|---|---|---|
| 2017 local election | 1 Oct 2017 | —N/a | 48.5; 6 | 31.0; 3 | —N/a | 6.8; 0 | 4.0; 0 | 9.7; 0 | 17.5 |
| UA-CIMAD; Seat projection | 14–20 Sep 2017 | 500 | 54.4; 6/7 | 12.7; 2/3 | —N/a | 2.6 – | 3.1 – | 27.2 – | 41.7 |
| 2013 local election | 29 Sep 2013 | —N/a | 48.6; 5 | 24.4; 3 | 10.1; 1 | 4.0; 0 | 3.7; 0 | 9.2; 0 | 24.2 |

=== Braga ===
| Polling firm/Link | Fieldwork date | Sample size | PSD CDS PPM | PS | CDU | IND | BE | O | Lead |
|---|---|---|---|---|---|---|---|---|---|
| 2017 local election | 1 Oct 2017 | —N/a | 52.1; 7 | 27.9; 3 | 9.6; 1 | —N/a | 4.8; 0 | 5.6; 0 | 24.2 |
| IPOM | 18–19 Sep 2017 | 748 | 52.5 | 27.3 | 8.1 | —N/a | 5.9 | 6.2 | 25.2 |
| Eurosondagem; Seat projection | 10–13 Sep 2017 | 711 | 50.0; 6/7 | 27.7; 3 | 10.0; 1 | —N/a | 6.0; 0/1 | 6.3 – | 22.3 |
| UCP–CESOP; Seat projection | 10–13 Sep 2017 | 848 | 46; 5/7 | 33; 4/5 | 7; 0/1 | —N/a | 6; 0/1 | 8 – | 13 |
| 2013 local election | 29 Sep 2013 | —N/a | 46.7; 6 | 32.8; 4 | 8.8; 1 | 5.3; 0 | —N/a | 6.4; 0 | 13.9 |

=== Batalha ===
| Polling firm/Link | Fieldwork date | Sample size | PSD | PS | CDS | CDU | O | Lead |
|---|---|---|---|---|---|---|---|---|
| 2017 local election | 1 Oct 2017 | —N/a | 53.8; 5 | 20.0; 1 | 12.0; 1 | 3.6; 0 | 10.6 | 33.8 |
| IPOM; Seat projection | 21–22 Sep 2017 | 658 | 54.2; 5 | 17.9; 1 | 12.8; 1 | 2.8 – | 12.3 – | 36.3 |
| 2013 local election | 29 Sep 2013 | —N/a | 55.2; 5 | 15.7; 1 | 11.3; 1 | 4.0; 0 | 13.7 | 39.5 |

=== Chaves ===
| Polling firm/Link | Fieldwork date | Sample size | PSD | PS | IND | CDU | CDS | BE | O | Lead |
|---|---|---|---|---|---|---|---|---|---|---|
| 2017 local election | 1 Oct 2017 | —N/a | 35.0; 3 | 51.4; 4 | —N/a | 5.7; 0 | 2.4; 0 | 1.3; 0 | 4.3 | 16.4 |
| IPOM | 10–12 Jul 2017 | 714 | 53.2 | 34.3 | —N/a | 6.6 | 2.5 | 0.6 | 3.0 | 24.0 |
| 2013 local election | 29 Sep 2013 | —N/a | 39.4; 3 | 29.7; 3 | 15.0; 1 | 6.2; 0 | 3.2; 0 | —N/a | 6.5 | 9.7 |

=== Coimbra ===
Exit poll

| Polling firm/Link | Fieldwork date | Sample size | PS | PSD CDS PPM MPT | CDU | CpC | CDS | SC | O | Lead |
|---|---|---|---|---|---|---|---|---|---|---|
| 2017 local election | 1 Oct 2017 | —N/a | 35.5; 5 | 26.6; 3 | 8.3; 1 | 7.0; 0 | w.PSD | 16.1; 2 | 6.6; 0 | 8.9 |
| UCP–CESOP | 1 Oct 2017 | 5,960 | 32– 36; 4/5 | 26– 29; 2/3 | 7– 9; 1 | 8– 10; 1 | w.PSD | 16– 19; 2 | – | 6– 7 |
| Intercampus | 1 Oct 2017 | 3,276 | 37.0– 42.0; 5/6 | 27.6– 31.6; 3/4 | 5.7– 8.7; 0/1 | 5.2– 8.2; 0/1 | w.PSD | 11.1– 15.1; 1/2 | 2.4– 5.4; 0 | 9.4– 10.4 |
| G.Triplo | 19–22 Sep 2017 | 678 | 34.2 | 14.2 | 2.4 | 5.0 | w.PSD | 7.7 | 36.6 | 20.0 |
| Aximage; Seat projection | 18–21 Sep 2017 | 600 | 28.7; 4 | 25.7; 3/4 | 7.2; 1 | 8.1; 1 | w.PSD | 13.4; 1/2 | 16.9 – | 3.0 |
| UCP–CESOP; Seat projection | 16–17 Sep 2017 | 895 | 35; 4/5 | 25; 3/4 | 9; 1 | 9; 1 | w.PSD | 16; 1/2 | 6 – | 10 |
| Eurosondagem; Seat projection | 11–13 Sep 2017 | 717 | 33.1; 4 | 26.7; 3 | 8.3; 1 | 9.0; 1 | w.PSD | 15.2; 2 | 7.7 – | 6.4 |
| 2013 local election | 29 Sep 2013 | —N/a | 35.5; 5 | 29.7; 4 | 11.1; 1 | 9.3; 1 | 3.9; 0 | —N/a | 6.6; 0 | 5.8 |

=== Évora ===
| Polling firm/Link | Fieldwork date | Sample size | CDU | PS | PSD | CDS PPM MPT | BE | O | Lead |
|---|---|---|---|---|---|---|---|---|---|
| 2017 local election | 1 Oct 2017 | —N/a | 40.5; 4 | 26.4; 2 | 14.9; 1 | 5.9; 0 | 4.8; 0 | 7.5; 0 | 14.1 |
| Eurosondagem; Seat projection | 10–12 Sep 2017 | 703 | 38.9; 3/4 | 29.6; 2/3 | 17.5; 1 | 5.3 – | 3.0 – | 5.7 – | 9.3 |
| 2013 local election | 29 Sep 2013 | —N/a | 49.3; 4 | 26.0; 2 | 14.7; 1 | | 3.9; 0 | 6.1 | 23.3 |

=== Fafe ===
| Polling firm/Link | Fieldwork date | Sample size | PS | IND | PSD CDS | CDU | CDS | BE | FS | O | Lead |
|---|---|---|---|---|---|---|---|---|---|---|---|
| 2017 local election | 1 Oct 2017 | —N/a | 37.3; 4 | —N/a | 18.4; 2 | 2.4; 0 | w.PSD | 1.7; 0 | 36.7; 3 | 4.3 | 0.6 |
| Eurosondagem; Seat projection | 18–19 Sep 2017 | 769 | 34.0; 3/4 | —N/a | 21.9; 2 | 3.3 – | w.PSD | 3.5 – | 33.3; 3/4 | 4.0 – | 0.7 |
| 2013 local election | 29 Sep 2013 | —N/a | 35.2; 4 | 35.1; 3 | 21.3; 2 | 3.0; 0 | 1.4; 0 | —N/a | —N/a | 4.1 | 0.1 |

=== Funchal ===
| Polling firm/Link | Fieldwork date | Sample size | PS | PSD | CDS | CDU | O | Lead |
|---|---|---|---|---|---|---|---|---|
| 2017 local election | 1 Oct 2017 | —N/a | 42.1; 6 | 32.1; 4 | 8.6; 1 | 3.6; 0 | 13.7; 0 | 10.0 |
| Eurosondagem; Seat projection | 20–21 Sep 2017 | 777 | 43.8; 6 | 31.8; 4 | 10.0; 1 | 5.0 – | 9.4 – | 12.0 |
| Eurosondagem; Seat projection | 12–14 Jul 2017 | 708 | 42.5; 6 | 30.8; 4 | 10.0; 1 | 5.0 – | 11.7 – | 11.7 |
| Eurosondagem; Seat projection | 12–13 Jan 2017 | 717 | 48.0; 6/7 | 25.8; 3/4 | 8.7; 1 | 6.3; 0/1 | 11.2; 0/1 | 22.2 |
| 2013 local election | 29 Sep 2013 | —N/a | 39.2; 5 | 32.4; 4 | 14.6; 2 | 8.4; 1 | 5.4 | 6.8 |

=== Gondomar ===
| Polling firm/Link | Fieldwork date | Sample size | PS | PSD CDS | CDU | BE | VL | O | Lead |
|---|---|---|---|---|---|---|---|---|---|
| 2017 local election | 1 Oct 2017 | —N/a | 45.5; 6 | 11.0; 1 | 15.4; 2 | 3.6; 0 | 19.9; 2 | 4.6 | 25.6 |
| DOMP | 28 Aug–22 Sep 2017 | 890 | 50 | 5 | 13 | 2 | 23 | 6 | 27 |
| 2013 local election | 29 Sep 2013 | —N/a | 46.4; 7 | 22.1; 3 | 12.2; 1 | 3.6; 0 | —N/a | 15.7 | 24.3 |

=== Guimarães ===
| Polling firm/Link | Fieldwork date | Sample size | PS | PSD CDS PPM MPT PPV | CDU | BE | O | Lead |
|---|---|---|---|---|---|---|---|---|
| 2017 local election | 1 Oct 2017 | —N/a | 51.5; 6 | 37.9; 5 | 5.2; 0 | 2.4; 0 | 2.9 | 13.6 |
| Eurosondagem; Seat projection | 22–23 Sep 2017 | 708 | 53.5; 7 | 31.0; 4 | 6.7 – | 3.3 – | 5.5 – | 22.5 |
| Eurosondagem; Seat projection | 10–11 Sep 2017 | 710 | 55.1; 7 | 30.0; 4 | 6.5 – | 3.0 – | 5.4 – | 25.1 |
| IPOM | 30 Aug–1 Sep 2017 | 854 | 45.3 | 43.1 | 6.5 | 1.4 | 3.7 | 2.2 |
| Eurosondagem; Seat projection | 25–26 Jun 2017 | 708 | 54.1; 7 | 30.7; 4 | 6.0 – | 4.2 – | 5.0 – | 23.4 |
| 2013 local election | 29 Sep 2013 | —N/a | 47.6; 6 | 35.6; 4 | 8.3; 1 | 2.0; 0 | 6.4; 0 | 12.0 |

=== Leiria ===
| Polling firm/Link | Fieldwork date | Sample size | PS | PSD MPT | CDS | CDU | BE | O | Lead |
|---|---|---|---|---|---|---|---|---|---|
| 2017 local election | 1 Oct 2017 | —N/a | 54.5; 8 | 27.0; 3 | 5.0; 0 | 2.4; 0 | 2.7; 0 | 8.4; 0 | 27.5 |
| IPOM; Seat projection | 22 Sep 2017 | 744 | 49.9; 7 | 26.3; 3 | 7.5; 1 | 4.3 – | 3.2 – | 8.8 – | 23.6 |
| Eurosondagem; Seat projection | 2–9 May 2017 | 1,069 | 52.0; 7/8 | 26.6; 3/4 | 3.0 – | 4.9 – | 4.2 – | 9.3 – | 25.4 |
| Eurosondagem | 14–17 Oct 2016 | 1,010 | 36.8 | 39.6 | 5.3 | 3.0 | 5.2 | 10.1 | 2.8 |
| 2013 local election | 29 Sep 2013 | —N/a | 46.3; 7 | 27.9; 4 | 4.7; 0 | 4.4; 0 | 3.3; 0 | 13.5 | 18.4 |

=== Lisbon ===
Exit poll

| Polling firm/Link | Fieldwork date | Sample size | PS | PSD | CDS PPM MPT | CDU | BE | O | Lead |
|---|---|---|---|---|---|---|---|---|---|
| 2017 local election | 1 Oct 2017 | —N/a | 42.0; 8 | 11.2; 2 | 20.6; 4 | 9.6; 2 | 7.1; 1 | 9.4; 0 | 21.4 |
| UCP–CESOP | 1 Oct 2017 | 11,694 | 43– 47; 8/10 | 9– 11; 2 | 18– 21; 3/4 | 9– 11; 2 | 7– 9; 1/2 | – | 25– 26 |
| Eurosondagem | 1 Oct 2017 | 8,761 | 41.4– 46.0; 9 | 8.4– 11.0; 1/2 | 16.2– 20.0; 3/4 | 10.0– 12.1; 2 | 7.7– 9.6; 1/2 | – | 25.2– 26.0 |
| Intercampus | 1 Oct 2017 | 5,238 | 44.3– 49.3; 8/9 | 8.1– 12.0; 1/2 | 15.5– 19.5; 3/4 | 8.3– 12.3; 1/2 | 6.2– 9.2; 1 | 4.6– 10.6; 0 | 28.8– 29.8 |
| Eurosondagem; Seat projection | 24–26 Sep 2017 | 1,010 | 43.3; 9 | 12.5; 2 | 17.5; 3 | 10.1; 2 | 5.7; 1 | 10.9 – | 25.8 |
| UCP–CESOP; Seat projection | 23–26 Sep 2017 | 1,185 | 47; 8/10 | 12; 2 | 15; 2/3 | 8; 1/2 | 8; 1/2 | 10 – | 32 |
| Aximage; Seat projection | 17–20 Sep 2017 | 600 | 47.0; 9/10 | 10.9; 2/3 | 12.6; 2/3 | 8.5; 2 | 5.5; 1 | 15.5 – | 34.4 |
| UCP–CESOP; Seat projection | 16 Sep 2017 | 764 | 41; 7/9 | 16; 3/4 | 17; 3/4 | 8; 1/2 | 8; 1/2 | 10 – | 24 |
| 2013 local election | 29 Sep 2013 | —N/a | 50.9; 11 | 22.4; 4 | | 9.9; 2 | 4.6; 0 | 12.3; 0 | 28.5 |

=== Loures ===
| Polling firm/Link | Fieldwork date | Sample size | CDU | PS | PSD PPM | BE | CDS | O | Lead |
|---|---|---|---|---|---|---|---|---|---|
| 2017 local election | 1 Oct 2017 | —N/a | 32.8; 4 | 28.2; 4 | 21.6; 3 | 3.6; 0 | 2.9; 0 | 11.0; 0 | 4.6 |
| Eurosondagem; Seat projection | 17–19 Sep 2017 | 710 | 36.6; 5 | 28.2; 4 | 18.2; 2 | 5.0 – | 2.8 – | 9.2 – | 8.4 |
| 2013 local election | 29 Sep 2013 | —N/a | 34.7; 5 | 31.2; 4 | 16.0; 2 | 3.2; 0 | 3.1; 0 | 11.8; 0 | 3.5 |

=== Maia ===
| Polling firm/Link | Fieldwork date | Sample size | PSD CDS | PS | CDU | BE | O | Lead |
|---|---|---|---|---|---|---|---|---|
| 2017 local election | 1 Oct 2017 | —N/a | 40.0; 6 | 36.6; 5 | 4.6; 0 | 5.8; 0 | 13.0; 0 | 3.4 |
| UCP–CESOP; Seat projection | 9–10 Sep 2017 | 718 | 41; 5/6 | 32; 4/5 | 7; 0/1 | 5 – | 15 – | 9 |
| IPOM | 26–29 Aug 2017 | 882 | 48.3 | 27.0 | 7.8 | 5.9 | 11.0 | 21.3 |
| Intercampus | 19–26 May 2017 | 800 | 27.1 | 31.1 | 3.6 | 2.6 | 35.5 | 4.0 |
| GTriplo | 20–30 Apr 2015 | 750 | 24.0 | 26.4 | 3.5 | 2.5 | 44.1 | 2.4 |
| 2013 local election | 29 Sep 2013 | —N/a | 50.2; 7 | 25.6; 3 | 7.7; 1 | 6.0; 0 | 10.6 | 24.6 |

=== Marinha Grande ===
| Polling firm/Link | Fieldwork date | Sample size | PS | CDU | MPM | +C | PSD MPT | BE | CDS PPM | O | Lead |
|---|---|---|---|---|---|---|---|---|---|---|---|
| 2017 local election | 1 Oct 2017 | —N/a | 29.4; 3 | 24.5; 2 | 22.1; 2 | 7.6; 0 | 4.9; 0 | 4.8; 0 | 0.8; 0 | 5.9 | 4.9 |
| IPOM; Seat projection | 22 Sep 2017 | 616 | 39.0; 4 | 28.4; 2 | 16.1; 1 | 3.2; 0 | 3.5 – | 0.6 – | —N/a | 8.8 – | 10.6 |
| 2013 local election | 29 Sep 2013 | —N/a | 29.9; 2 | 24.8; 2 | 12.0; 1 | 11.0; 1 | 10.6; 1 | 2.8; 0 | 1.1; 0 | 7.9 | 5.1 |

=== Matosinhos ===
Exit poll

| Polling firm/Link | Fieldwork date | Sample size | IND | PS | PSD | CDU | BE | CDS | NM | SIM | O | Lead |
|---|---|---|---|---|---|---|---|---|---|---|---|---|
| 2017 local election | 1 Oct 2017 | —N/a | —N/a | 36.3; 5 | 11.9; 1 | 6.7; 1 | 4.6; 0 | —N/a | 16.2; 2 | 15.2; 2 | 9.2; 0 | 20.1 |
| Intercampus | 1 Oct 2017 | 4,266 | – | 34.8– 39.8; 4/5 | 8.0– 11.0; 1 | 4.9– 7.9; 0/1 | 3.1– 6.1; 0 | – | 14.5– 18.5; 2/3 | 16.9– 20.9; 2/3 | 5.3– 9.3; 0 | 17.9– 18.9 |
| UCP–CESOP; Seat projection | 23–24 Sep 2017 | 1,143 | —N/a | 38; 5/6 | 11; 1 | 8; 1 | 5 – | —N/a | 15; 2 | 13; 1/2 | 10 – | 23 |
| Eurosondagem; Seat projection | 18–20 Sep 2017 | 707 | —N/a | 31.9; 4/5 | 10.2; 1 | 6.1; 0/1 | 5.0 – | —N/a | 25.8; 3/4 | 13.5; 2 | 7.5 – | 6.1 |
| UCP–CESOP; Seat projection | 16–17 Sep 2017 | 1,364 | —N/a | 33; 4/5 | 9; 1 | 8; 1 | 5 – | —N/a | 21; 2/3 | 17; 1/2 | 7 – | 12 |
| 2013 local election | 29 Sep 2013 | —N/a | 43.4; 6 | 25.3; 3 | 9.3; 1 | 7.3; 1 | 3.6; 1 | 1.9; 0 | —N/a | —N/a | 9.2; 0 | 18.1 |

=== Odivelas ===
Exit poll

| Polling firm/Link | Fieldwork date | Sample size | PS | CDU | PSD | BE | CDS | PSD CDS | O | Lead |
|---|---|---|---|---|---|---|---|---|---|---|
| 2017 local election | 1 Oct 2017 | —N/a | 45.1; 6 | 14.8; 2 | —N/a | 6.1; 0 | —N/a | 21.7; 3 | 12.3; 0 | 23.4 |
| Intercampus | 1 Oct 2017 | 3,555 | 43.2– 48.2; 6/7 | 12.6– 16.6; 1/2 | – | 5.6– 8.6; 0/1 | – | 20.2– 24.2; 2/3 | 8.9– 11.9; 0 | 23.0– 24.0 |
| 2013 local election | 29 Sep 2013 | —N/a | 39.5; 6 | 21.3; 3 | 18.5; 2 | 5.0; 0 | 4.1; 0 | —N/a | 11.6; 0 | 18.2 |

=== Oeiras ===
Exit poll

| Polling firm/Link | Fieldwork date | Sample size | IOMAF | PSD | PS | CDU | CDS | BE | IN-OV | PSD CDS PPM | O | Lead |
|---|---|---|---|---|---|---|---|---|---|---|---|---|
| 2017 local election | 1 Oct 2017 | —N/a | 14.2; 2 | —N/a | 13.4; 1 | 7.8; 1 | —N/a | 3.1; 0 | 41.7; 6 | 8.8; 1 | 11.0; 0 | 27.5 |
| UCP–CESOP | 1 Oct 2017 | 7,570 | 13– 15; 2 | – | 12– 14; 1/2 | 8– 10; 1 | – | – | 42– 46; 5/6 | 8– 10; 1 | – | 29– 31 |
| Intercampus | 1 Oct 2017 | 3,782 | 15.0– 19.0; 2/3 | – | 11.1– 15.1; 1/2 | 5.1– 8.1; 0/1 | – | – | 42.2– 47.2; 6/7 | 5.9– 8.9; 0/1 | 9.7– 12.7; 0 | 27.5– 28.5 |
| Eurosondagem; Seat projection | 22–25 Sep 2017 | 708 | 16.8; 2 | —N/a | 14.0; 2 | 8.0; 1 | —N/a | 3.0 – | 36.7; 5 | 10.0; 1 | 11.5 – | 19.9 |
| UCP–CESOP; Seat projection | 23–24 Sep 2017 | 1,195 | 15; 2 | —N/a | 15; 2 | 10; 1 | —N/a | 2 – | 37; 5 | 7; 1 | 14 – | 22 |
| Aximage; Seat projection | 21–23 Sep 2017 | 600 | 23.4; 3 | —N/a | 11.2; 1 | 7.6; 1 | —N/a | —N/a | 36.8; 5 | 7.5; 1 | 13.5 – | 13.4 |
| Consulmark2; Seat projection | 21–30 Jul 2017 | 604 | 21.0; 3 | —N/a | 10.0; 1 | 5.0 – | —N/a | 1.0 – | 45.0; 6 | 9.0; 1 | 9.0 – | 24.0 |
| Eurosondagem; Seat projection | 4–6 Apr 2017 | 1,008 | 22.5; 3 | 10.1; 1 | 20.0; 2/3 | 6.9; 0/1 | 2.1 – | 3.3 – | 27.6; 3/4 | —N/a | 7.5 – | 5.1 |
| 2013 local election | 29 Sep 2013 | —N/a | 33.5; 5 | 19.2; 3 | 18.3; 2 | 9.2; 1 | 3.8; 0 | 3.7; 0 | —N/a | —N/a | 12.4; 0 | 14.3 |

=== Ovar ===
| Polling firm/Link | Fieldwork date | Sample size | PSD | PS | CDU | BE | CDS | O | Lead |
|---|---|---|---|---|---|---|---|---|---|
| 2017 local election | 1 Oct 2017 | —N/a | 65.1; 7 | 18.6; 2 | 4.2; 0 | 3.4; 0 | 4.4; 0 | 4.4 | 46.5 |
| IPOM | 25–26 Sep 2017 | 595 | 60.9 | 20.7 | 8.0 | 4.0 | 2.4 | 4.0 | 40.2 |
| 2013 local election | 29 Sep 2013 | —N/a | 43.9; 4 | 35.1; 3 | 6.0; 0 | 4.8; 0 | 3.0; 0 | 7.3 | 8.8 |

=== Paredes ===
| Polling firm/Link | Fieldwork date | Sample size | PSD | PS | CDU | CDS | BE | MPP | O | Lead |
|---|---|---|---|---|---|---|---|---|---|---|
| 2017 local election | 1 Oct 2017 | —N/a | 36.2; 4 | 50.4; 5 | 2.9; 0 | 3.7; 0 | 1.3; 0 | 2.2; 0 | 3.5 | 14.2 |
| IPOM | 21–24 Nov 2016 | 695 | 24.2 | 22.4 | 2.3 | 1.9 | —N/a | —N/a | 49.1 | 1.8 |
| IPOM | 21–24 Nov 2016 | 695 | 17.3 | 24.6 | 2.6 | 3.6 | —N/a | —N/a | 51.9 | 7.3 |
| 2013 local election | 29 Sep 2013 | —N/a | 41.1; 5 | 40.9; 4 | 6.4; 0 | 3.7; 0 | 1.8; 0 | —N/a | 6.1 | 0.2 |

=== Paços de Ferreira ===
| Polling firm/Link | Fieldwork date | Sample size | PS | PSD | CDU | CDS | BE | O | Lead |
|---|---|---|---|---|---|---|---|---|---|
| 2017 local election | 1 Oct 2017 | —N/a | 64.8; 5 | 29.0; 2 | 1.3; 0 | 1.1; 0 | —N/a | 3.8; 0 | 35.8 |
| Domp | 26–30 Sep 2015 | 601 | 50.4 | 20.6 | 2.0 | 0.9 | 1.1 | 25.1 | 29.8 |
| 2013 local election | 29 Sep 2013 | —N/a | 46.9; 4 | 44.4; 3 | 2.7; 0 | 1.4; 0 | —N/a | 4.6; 0 | 2.5 |

=== Pedrógão Grande ===
| Polling firm/Link | Fieldwork date | Sample size | PSD | PS | CDU | CDS | IND | O | Lead |
|---|---|---|---|---|---|---|---|---|---|
| 2017 local election | 1 Oct 2017 | —N/a | 38.0; 2 | 55.8; 3 | 1.4; 0 | 1.3; 0 | —N/a | 3.4 | 17.8 |
| IPOM | 2–3 Mar 2017 | 415 | 26.3 | 8.4 | —N/a | —N/a | 20.5 | 44.8 | 5.8 |
| IPOM | 2–3 Mar 2017 | 415 | 19.5 | —N/a | —N/a | —N/a | 24.8 | 55.7 | 5.3 |
| 2013 local election | 29 Sep 2013 | —N/a | 56.6; 3 | 36.6; 2 | 1.3; 0 | —N/a | —N/a | 5.5 | 20.0 |

=== Pombal ===
| Polling firm/Link | Fieldwork date | Sample size | PSD | PS | CDS | CDU | BE | NMPH | O | Lead |
|---|---|---|---|---|---|---|---|---|---|---|
| 2017 local election | 1 Oct 2017 | —N/a | 46.3; 5 | 11.7; 1 | 6.4; 0 | 1.2; 0 | 2.3; 0 | 24.4; 3 | 7.6; 0 | 21.9 |
| IPOM; Seat projection | 14–15 Sep 2017 | 703 | 41.0; 4 | 13.9; 1 | 1.5 – | 1.0 – | 0.5 – | 36.3; 4 | 5.8 – | 4.7 |
| 2013 local election | 29 Sep 2013 | —N/a | 55.0; 6 | 26.8; 3 | 6.2; 0 | 3.2; 0 | —N/a | —N/a | 8.9 | 28.2 |

=== Ponta do Sol ===
| Polling firm/Link | Fieldwork date | Sample size | PSD | PS | CDS | IND | BE | CDU | O | Lead |
|---|---|---|---|---|---|---|---|---|---|---|
| 2017 local election | 1 Oct 2017 | —N/a | 38.7; 2 | 40.3; 2 | 14.2; 1 | —N/a | 1.8; 0 | 0.8; 0 | 4.3; 0 | 1.5 |
| Eurosondagem; Seat projection | 21–22 Sep 2017 | 255 | 50.4; 3 | 33.6; 2 | 6.4 – | —N/a | 3.6 – | 1.4 – | 4.6 – | 16.8 |
| 2013 local election | 29 Sep 2013 | —N/a | 56.0; 4 | 20.6; 1 | 8.2; 0 | 6.9; 0 | 1.8; 0 | 1.1; 0 | 5.5; 0 | 35.4 |

=== Porto ===
Exit poll

| Polling firm/Link | Fieldwork date | Sample size | RM | PS | PSD PPM | CDU | BE | O | Lead |
|---|---|---|---|---|---|---|---|---|---|
| 2017 local election | 1 Oct 2017 | —N/a | 44.5; 7 | 28.6; 4 | 10.4; 1 | 5.9; 1 | 5.3; 0 | 5.4; 0 | 15.9 |
| UCP–CESOP | 1 Oct 2017 | 11,592 | 43– 48; 6/8 | 28– 31; 4/5 | 8– 10; 1 | 6– 8; 0/1 | 5– 7; 0/1 | – | 15– 17 |
| Eurosondagem | 1 Oct 2017 | 7,657 | 37.7– 42.0; 7 | 30.3– 34.0; 5 | 7.7– 11.0; 1 | 4.8– 7.2; 0/1 | 4.8– 7.2; 0/1 | – | 7.4– 8.0 |
| Intercampus | 1 Oct 2017 | 4,354 | 42.0– 47.0; 6/7 | 27.7– 31.7; 4/5 | 8.1– 11.1; 1/2 | 5.0– 8.0; 0/1 | 4.2– 7.2; 0/1 | 1.0– 7.0; 0 | 14.3– 15.3 |
| Eurosondagem; Seat projection | 24–26 Sep 2017 | 725 | 40.8; 6/7 | 30.8; 4/5 | 11.0; 1/2 | 6.9; 1 | 5.4; 0/1 | 5.1 – | 10.0 |
| UCP–CESOP; Seat projection | 23–25 Sep 2017 | 1,239 | 34; 5/6 | 34; 5/6 | 9; 1/2 | 8; 1 | 7; 0/1 | 8 – | Tie |
| Aximage; Seat projection | 16–19 Sep 2017 | 600 | 39.9; 6/7 | 20.8; 3/4 | 11.8; 2 | 8.9; 1 | 5.3; 0/1 | 13.3 – | 19.1 |
| UCP–CESOP; Seat projection | 16–17 Sep 2017 | 1,239 | 34; 4/6 | 33; 4/6 | 13; 1/2 | 8; 1 | 6; 0/1 | 6 – | 1 |
| Eurosondagem; Seat projection | 19–21 Jul 2017 | 1,525 | 46.9; 7 | 22.5; 3 | 12.1; 2 | 8.2; 1 | 5.5 – | 4.8 – | 24.4 |
| Eurosondagem; Seat projection | 15–17 May 2017 | 1,011 | 44.8; 6/7 | 22.2; 3 | 15.1; 2 | 6.9; 1 | 6.0; 0/1 | 5.0 – | 22.6 |
| 2013 local election | 29 Sep 2013 | —N/a | 39.3; 6 | 22.7; 3 | 21.1; 3 | 7.4; 1 | 3.6; 0 | 6.0; 0 | 16.6 |

=== Póvoa de Lanhoso ===
| Polling firm/Link | Fieldwork date | Sample size | PSD | PS | CDS | CDU | MAI | O | Lead |
|---|---|---|---|---|---|---|---|---|---|
| 2017 local election | 1 Oct 2017 | —N/a | 43.5; 4 | 42.5; 3 | —N/a | 0.9; 0 | 10.6; 0 | 2.5 | 1.0 |
| IPOM | 22–23 Sep 2017 | 551 | 44.6 | 37.2 | —N/a | —N/a | 13.5 | 4.7 | 7.4 |
| 2013 local election | 29 Sep 2013 | —N/a | 51.1; 4 | 40.3; 3 | 4.2; 0 | 1.4; 0 | —N/a | 3.1 | 10.8 |

=== Ribeira Brava ===
| Polling firm/Link | Fieldwork date | Sample size | PSD | PS | CDS | CDU | BE | JPP | RB1 | O | Lead |
|---|---|---|---|---|---|---|---|---|---|---|---|
| 2017 local election | 1 Oct 2017 | —N/a | 32.4; 3 | 4.5; 0 | —N/a | 0.9; 0 | 0.7; 0 | 6.2; 0 | 51.8; 4 | 3.5 | 19.4 |
| Eurosondagem; Seat projection | 13–14 Sep 2017 | 280 | 27.6; 2 | 13.2; 1 | —N/a | 2.4 – | 2.8 – | 10.0; 1 | 36.4; 3 | 7.6 – | 8.8 |
| Eurosondagem; Seat projection | 7–8 Sep 2017 | —N/a | 26.4; 2 | 10.8; 1 | —N/a | 2.0 – | 2.8 – | 10.0; 1 | 37.6; 3 | 10.4 – | 11.2 |
| 2013 local election | 29 Sep 2013 | —N/a | 41.6; 4 | 21.8; 2 | 20.0; 1 | 3.5; 0 | 2.7; 0 | —N/a | —N/a | 10.5; 0 | 19.8 |

=== Santa Cruz ===
| Polling firm/Link | Fieldwork date | Sample size | IND | PSD | CDU | JPP | PS | CDS | BE | O | Lead |
|---|---|---|---|---|---|---|---|---|---|---|---|
| 2017 local election | 1 Oct 2017 | —N/a | —N/a | 17.1; 1 | 1.5; 0 | 60.0; 6 | 6.9; 0 | 4.9; 0 | 1.4; 0 | 8.3; 0 | 42.9 |
| Eurosondagem; Seat projection | 25–26 Sep 2017 | 480 | —N/a | 20.0; 1/2 | 4.0 – | 50.5; 4/5 | 10.0; 0/1 | 4.2 – | 2.5 – | 8.8 – | 30.5 |
| 2013 local election | 29 Sep 2013 | —N/a | 64.4; 5 | 23.1; 2 | 4.3; 0 | —N/a | —N/a | —N/a | —N/a | 7.8; 0 | 41.3 |

=== São João da Madeira ===
| Polling firm/Link | Fieldwork date | Sample size | PSD | PS | IND | CDU | CDS | BE | PSD CDS | O | Lead |
|---|---|---|---|---|---|---|---|---|---|---|---|
| 2017 local election | 1 Oct 2017 | —N/a | —N/a | 55.4; 5 | —N/a | 4.0; 0 | —N/a | 2.4; 0 | 32.2; 2 | 6.0; 0 | 23.2 |
| IPOM | 25–26 Sep 2017 | 676 | —N/a | 36.2 | —N/a | 6.5 | —N/a | 2.2 | 43.2 | 7.3 | 7.0 |
| Eurosondagem; Seat projection | 21–22 Sep 2017 | 748 | —N/a | 41.5; 3/4 | —N/a | 7.3 – | —N/a | 2.8 – | 41.3; 3/4 | 7.1 – | 0.2 |
| IPOM | 15–16 Sep 2017 | 614 | —N/a | 37.8 | —N/a | 5.0 | —N/a | 1.9 | 48.0 | 7.3 | 10.2 |
| Eurosondagem; Seat projection | 7–8 Sep 2017 | 525 | —N/a | 41.5; 3/4 | —N/a | 6.7 – | —N/a | 2.3 – | 41.7; 3/4 | 7.8 – | 0.2 |
| IPOM | 18–21 Jul 2017 | 653 | —N/a | 35.8 | —N/a | 6.2 | —N/a | —N/a | 53.0 | 4.9 | 17.2 |
| 2016 by-election | 24 Jan 2016 | —N/a | —N/a | 37.9; 3 | 6.3; 0 | 5.2; 0 | —N/a | 2.5; 0 | 44.8; 4 | 3.4; 0 | 6.9 |
| IPOM | 16–19 Jan 2016 | 468 | —N/a | 32.0 | 5.0 | 6.5 | —N/a | 2.4 | 47.5 | 6.5 | 15.5 |
| Eurosondagem; Seat projection | 17–18 Jan 2016 | 707 | —N/a | 37.0; 3 | 6.8 – | 5.5 – | —N/a | 4.8 – | 43.3; 4 | 2.5 – | 6.3 |
| IPOM | 9–12 Jan 2016 | 454 | —N/a | 33.1 | 4.7 | 5.7 | —N/a | 2.5 | 46.1 | 7.9 | 13.0 |
| IPOM | 28 Dec 2015–5 Jan 2016 | 589 | —N/a | 33.2 | 4.7 | 5.0 | —N/a | 1.0 | 46.7 | 9.4 | 13.5 |
| 2013 local election | 29 Sep 2013 | —N/a | 38.0; 3 | 35.1; 3 | 10.0; 1 | 6.2; 0 | 3.0; 0 | 2.3; 0 | —N/a | 5.5 | 2.9 |

=== Sintra ===
Exit poll

| Polling firm/Link | Fieldwork date | Sample size | PS | IND | PSD CDS PPM MPT | CDU | BE | O | Lead |
|---|---|---|---|---|---|---|---|---|---|
| 2017 local election | 1 Oct 2017 | —N/a | 43.1; 6 | —N/a | 29.0; 4 | 9.4; 1 | 6.3; 0 | 12.2; 0 | 14.1 |
| Intercampus | 1 Oct 2017 | 3,683 | 41.5– 46.5; 5/6 | – | 28.3– 32.3; 3/4 | 8.0– 11.0; 1 | 5.3– 8.3; 0/1 | 7.8– 10.8; 0 | 13.2– 14.2 |
| Aximage; Seat projection | 19–21 Sep 2017 | 600 | 40.4; 5/6 | —N/a | 28.8; 3/4 | 11.9; 1 | 6.4; 0/1 | 12.5 – | 11.6 |
| Eurosondagem; Seat projection | 18–20 Sep 2017 | 721 | 42.8; 5/6 | —N/a | 28.5; 3/4 | 10.0; 1 | 7.0; 0/1 | 11.7 – | 14.3 |
| UCP–CESOP; Seat projection | 17–19 Sep 2017 | 1,169 | 42; 5/6 | —N/a | 26; 3/4 | 9; 1 | 7; 0/1 | 16 – | 16 |
| 2013 local election | 29 Sep 2013 | —N/a | 26.8; 4 | 25.4; 4 | 13.8; 2 | 12.5; 1 | 4.5; 0 | 16.9; 0 | 1.4 |

=== Soure ===
| Polling firm/Link | Fieldwork date | Sample size | PS | PSD CDS PPM | CDU | IND | BE | O | Lead |
|---|---|---|---|---|---|---|---|---|---|
| 2017 local election | 1 Oct 2017 | —N/a | 59.1; 5 | 21.4; 1 | 13.0; 1 | —N/a | —N/a | 6.5 | 37.7 |
| Eurosondagem; Seat projection | 1–3 Feb 2017 | 1,010 | 50.0 | 37.5 | 4.1 | —N/a | 3.1 | 5.3 | 12.5 |
| Eurosondagem; Seat projection | 1–3 Feb 2017 | 1,010 | 48.2; 4 | 33.9; 2/3 | 10.8; 0/1 | —N/a | —N/a | 7.1 | 14.3 |
| 2013 local election | 29 Sep 2013 | —N/a | 39.3; 3 | 37.0; 3 | 9.9; 1 | 8.0; 0 | —N/a | 5.9 | 2.3 |

=== Valongo ===
| Polling firm/Link | Fieldwork date | Sample size | PS | PSD PPM | CDU | BE | CDS | PSD CDS | O | Lead |
|---|---|---|---|---|---|---|---|---|---|---|
| 2017 local election | 1 Oct 2017 | —N/a | 57.3; 6 | —N/a | 5.2; 0 | 4.2; 0 | —N/a | 26.4; 3 | 6.9; 0 | 30.9 |
| Consulmark2 | 15–27 Jun 2016 | 300 | 48 | 27 | 9 | 5 | 3 | —N/a | 8 | 21 |
| Consulmark2 | 15–27 Jun 2016 | 300 | 49 | 25 | 9 | 4 | 4 | —N/a | 9 | 24 |
| 2013 local election | 29 Sep 2013 | —N/a | 38.9; 4 | 36.7; 4 | 8.3; 1 | 4.4; 0 | 2.6; 0 | —N/a | 9.2 | 2.2 |

=== Vila Nova de Gaia ===
| Polling firm/Link | Fieldwork date | Sample size | PS | PSD CDS | IND | CDU | BE | O | Lead |
|---|---|---|---|---|---|---|---|---|---|
| 2017 local election | 1 Oct 2017 | —N/a | 61.9; 9 | 20.3; 2 | —N/a | 4.5; 0 | 5.2; 0 | 8.3; 0 | 41.6 |
| UCP–CESOP; Seat projection | 9–10 Sep 2017 | 760 | 53; 6/8 | 22; 3/4 | —N/a | 6; 0/1 | 8; 0/1 | 11 – | 31 |
| 2013 local election | 29 Sep 2013 | —N/a | 38.2; 5 | 20.0; 3 | 19.7; 3 | 6.4; 0 | 3.1; 0 | 12.7; 0 | 18.2 |

=== Vila Real de Santo António ===
| Polling firm/Link | Fieldwork date | Sample size | PSD | PS | CDU | BE | CDS | O | Lead |
|---|---|---|---|---|---|---|---|---|---|
| 2017 local election | 1 Oct 2017 | —N/a | 45.0; 4 | 30.1; 2 | 18.8; 1 | 2.7; 0 | —N/a | 3.5 | 14.9 |
| Aximage; Seat projection | 15–17 Sep 2017 | 400 | 40.1; 3/4 | 28.8; 2/3 | 10.7; 1 | 2.3 – | —N/a | 18.1 – | 11.3 |
| 2013 local election | 29 Sep 2013 | —N/a | 53.6; 4 | 23.0; 2 | 13.0; 1 | 3.8; 0 | 1.1; 0 | 5.5 | 30.6 |
