= 2017 Portuguese local elections =

- 1 October 2017

All 308 Portuguese municipalities and 3,092 Portuguese Parishes All 2,074 local government councils
- Opinion polls
- Turnout: 55.0% ▲2.4 pp
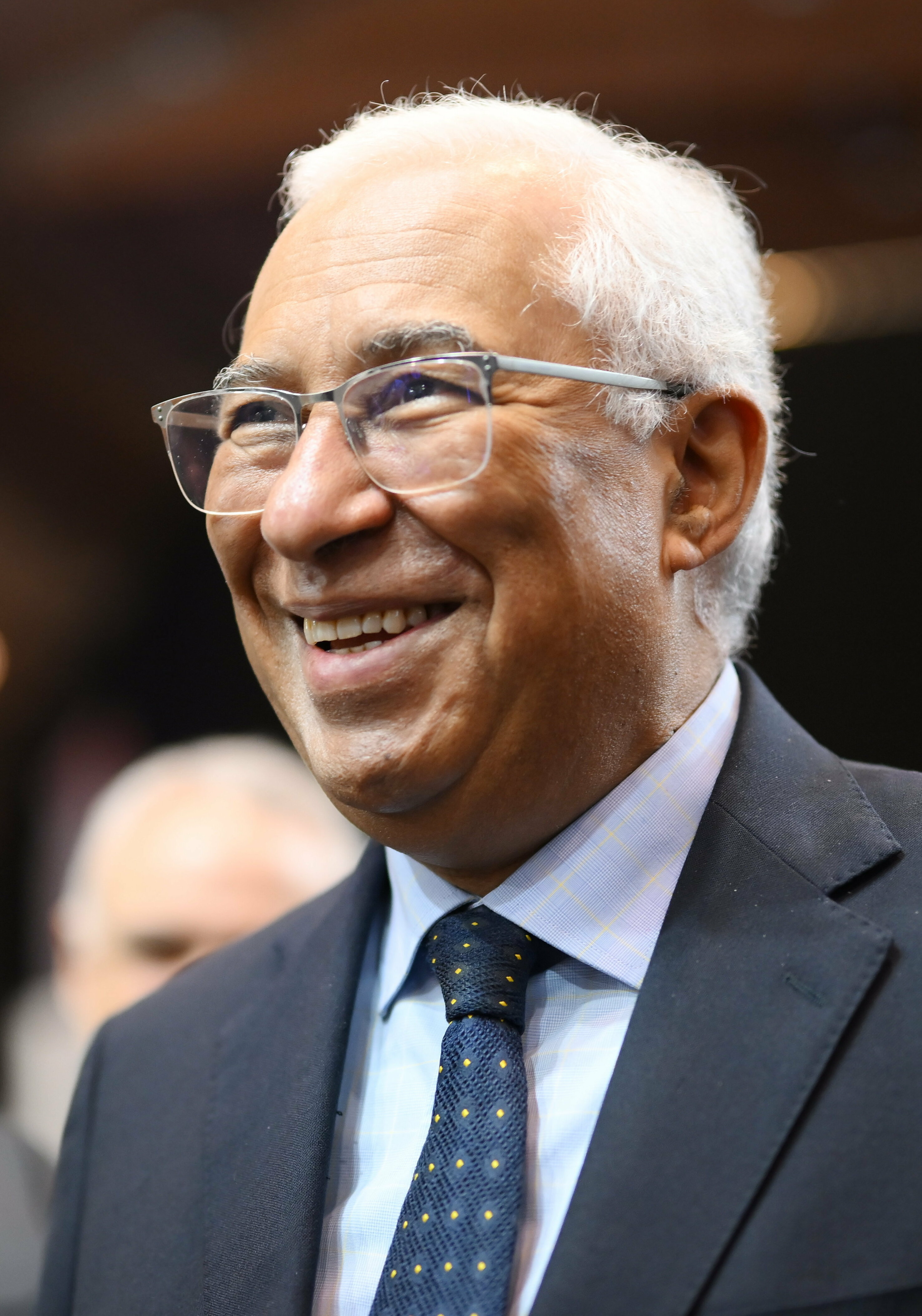

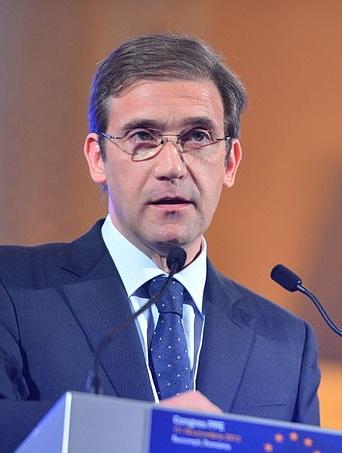

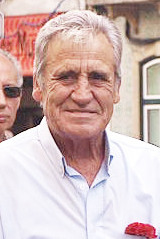
	First party	Second party	Third party
Leader	António Costa	Pedro Passos Coelho	Jerónimo de Sousa
Party	PS	PSD	PCP
Alliance			CDU
Last election	150 mayors, 36.7%	106 mayors, 31.4%	34 mayors, 11.1%
Popular vote	2,003,914	1,569,424	489,189
Percentage	38.7%	30.3%	9.5%
Swing	▲2.0 pp	▼1.1 pp	▼1.6 pp
Mayors	160	98	24
Mayors +/–	▲10	▼8	▼10
Councillors	963	729	171
Councillors +/–	▲34	▼41	▼42

Local elections were held in Portugal on 1 October 2017. The elections consisted of three separate elections in the 308 Portuguese municipalities, the election for the Municipal Chambers, another election for the Municipal Assembly, as well an election for the lower-level Parish Assembly, whose winner is elected parish president. This last election was held in the more than 3,000 parishes around the country. In the 2017 election, 13.3 percent of incumbent mayors, 41 to be precise, were barred from running for another term.

The Socialist Party (PS) was the big winner of the elections consolidating their position as the largest local party in Portugal. The PS won 160 mayors, 10 more than in 2013, and more than 38 percent of the votes. The Socialists maintained control in cities like Lisbon, although here they lost their majority, Funchal and Coimbra, at the same time they gained some strong PSD bastions like Chaves or Mirandela. Nonetheless, the PS lost one of their bastions, Vila do Conde, to an independent. The strong nationwide results for the PS helped to legitimize António Costa's position as Prime Minister after his loss in the 2015 general elections. It was also the first time since 1985, that the party in government clearly won a nationwide local election.

The Social Democrats (PSD) were one of the big losers of the elections. They lost 8 cities in comparison to 2013, although, in term of votes won, they got basically the same number compared to 2013. The PSD achieved very bad results in Lisbon and Porto, polling third and below 15 percent of the votes. The worse than expected results led Pedro Passos Coelho to question, on election night, if he had the political ground to continue as leader of the party. Two days later, on October 3, Passos Coelho announced he would not stand for another term as PSD leader.

The CDU was also one of the big losers of the election. The Communist-Green alliance resumed its decline, losing 10 cities, 9 to the PS and 1 to an independent, and polling below 10% of the votes. The coalition lost strong bastions in Setúbal district like Almada and Barreiro and wasn't able to hold on to Beja. On the flip side, CDS – People's Party had a very strong performance, especially in Lisbon. Assunção Cristas, CDS leader and candidate for Lisbon mayor, polled second and won 21 percent of the votes, 10 points ahead of the PSD. In the country as a whole, the CDS was able to gain one municipality from the PSD, Oliveira do Bairro, and managed to retain the other 5 cities it won in 2013.

Independent movements also increased their scores compared to 2013. A total 17 independent candidates gained or maintained control in their respective cities, especially Rui Moreira, mayor of Porto, as he was able to win re-election with a majority. Smaller parties also made gains: Livre, in coalition with the PS, gained Felgueiras from the PSD, We, the Citizens! won Oliveira de Frades from a PSD/CDS coalition and JPP maintained control of Santa Cruz in the Madeira islands.

Turnout in these elections increased compared with four years ago, with 55.0 percent of voters casting a ballot.

== Background ==
=== Electoral system ===
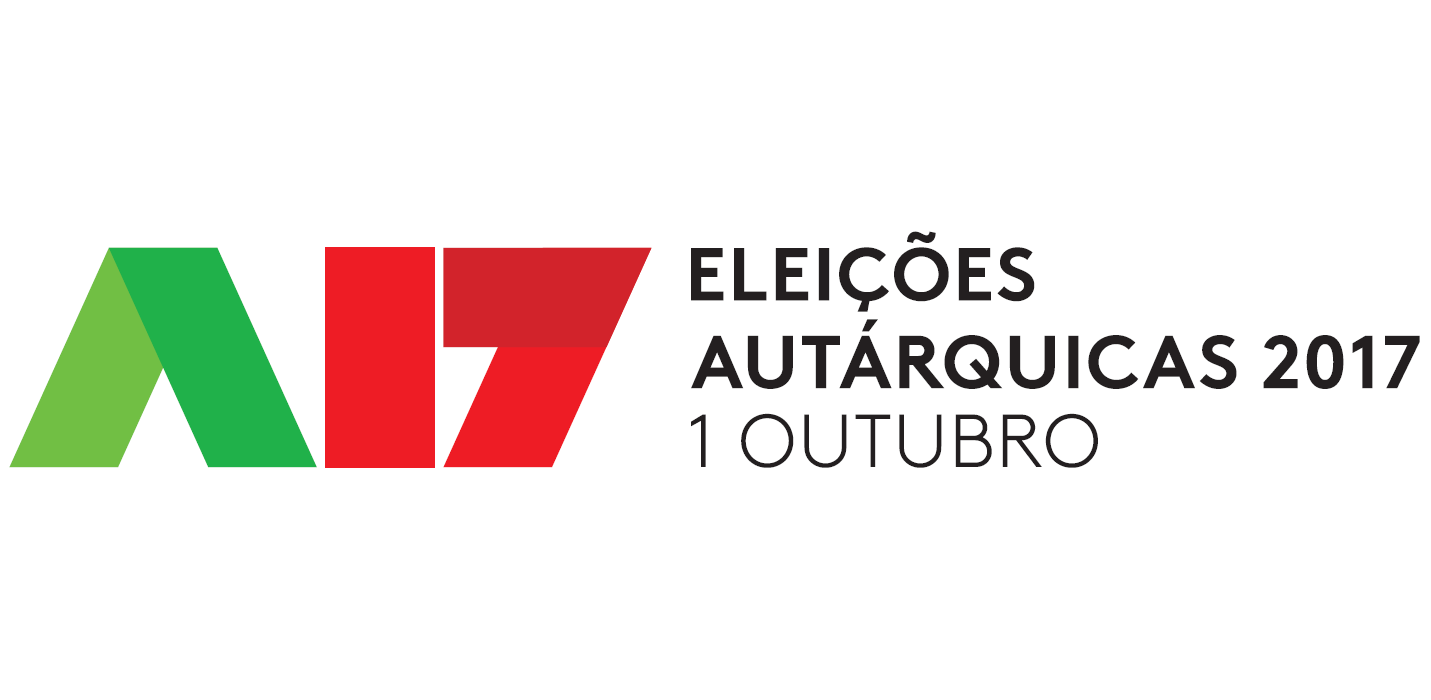
Official logo of the election.

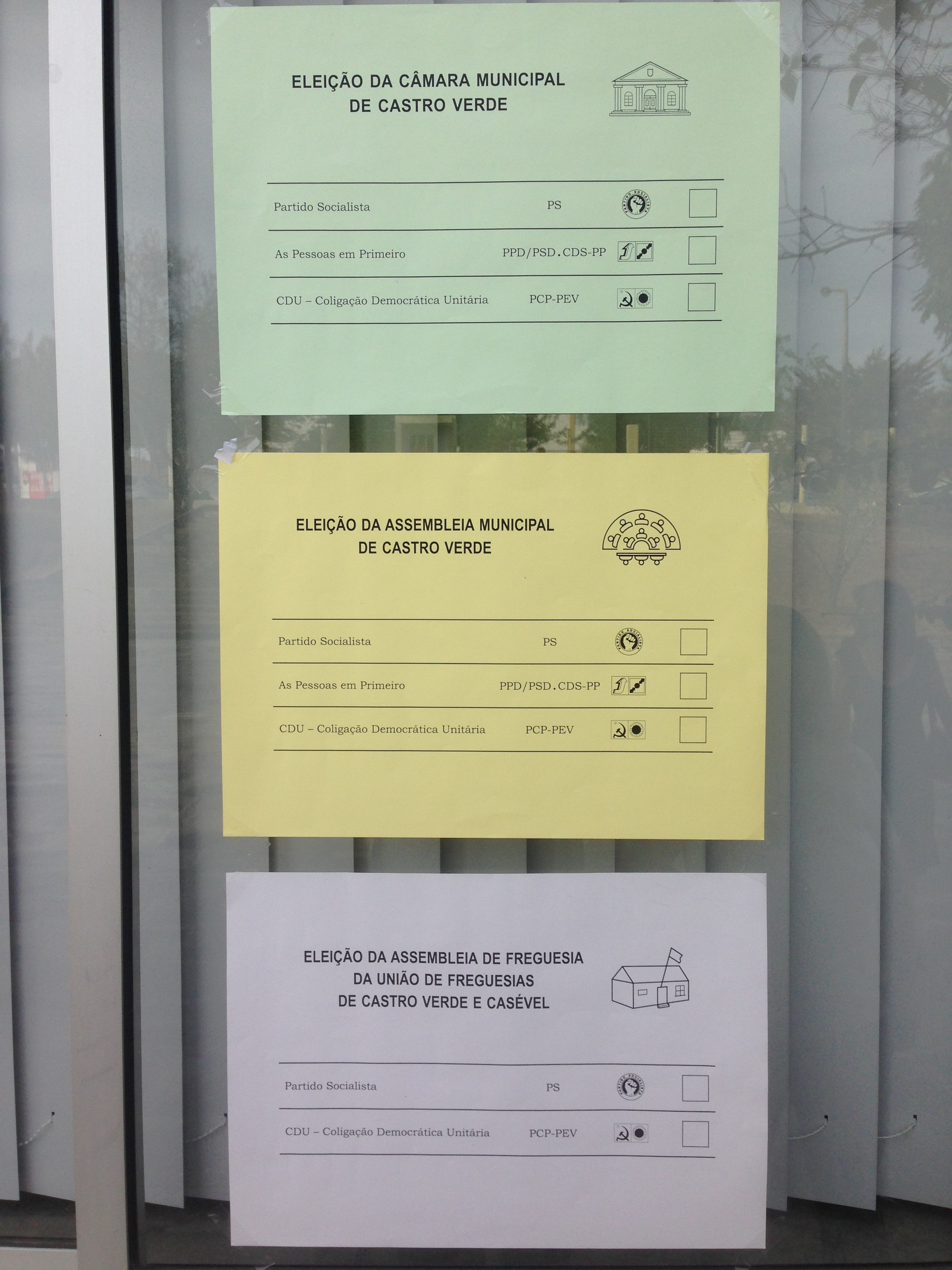
Ballots for the 2017 local elections in Castro Verde.

All 308 municipalities are allocated a certain number of councilors to elect corresponding to the number of registered voters in a given municipality. Each party or coalition must present a list of candidates. The winner of the most voted list for the municipal council is automatically elected mayor, similar to first-past-the-post (FPTP). The lists are closed and the seats in each municipality are apportioned according to the D'Hondt method. Unlike in national legislative elections, independent lists are allowed to run.

Council seats and Parish assembly seats are distributed as follows:

Seat allocation for the 2017 local election
Councilors		Parish Assembly	
Seats	Voters	Seats	Voters
17	only Lisbon	21	more than 40,000 voters
13	only Porto	19	more than 20,000 voters
11	100,000 voters or more	13	more than 5,000 voters
9	more than 50,000 voters	9	more than 1,000 voters
7	more than 10,000 voters	7	1,000 voters or less
5	10,000 voters or less		

- For parishes with more than 30,000 voters, the number of seats mentioned above is increased in one per 10,000 voters beyond that number (if, by applying this rule the result is even, the number of seats is increased in one more.

=== By-elections (2013–2017) ===
During the normal four-year term of local governments, one municipal council by-election was held in the municipality of São João da Madeira on 24 January 2016, after the resignation of the local government and mayor, under a PSD minority, claiming a lack of conditions to govern due to the opposition's blockade. The by-election results gave the PSD/CDS–PP coalition a majority of 4 councillors and nearly 45% of the votes, while the PS held on to their 3 councillors and nearly 38% of the votes; Other parties and lists all polled below 7%. Adding to this, fifteen parishes also held a by-election for parish assemblies.

City control in by-elections (2013–2017)
Date	Municipality	Population	Previous control	New control
24 January 2016	São João da Madeira	21,713	Social Democratic Party (PSD)	PSD / CDS–PP

== Parties ==
The main political forces that contested the election were:

- Left Bloc (BE)
- CDS – People's Party (CDS–PP) (only in some municipalities)^{1}
- Unitary Democratic Coalition (CDU)
- Together for the People (JPP)
- People–Animals–Nature (PAN)
- Socialist Party (PS)
- Social Democratic Party (PSD) (only in some municipalities)^{1}

^{1} The PSD and the CDS–PP also formed coalitions in several municipalities with the Earth Party (MPT) and the People's Monarchist Party (PPM).

== Voter turnout ==
The table below shows voter turnout throughout election day.

Turnout	Time								
Turnout	12:00			16:00			19:00		
Turnout	2013	2017	±	2013	2017	±	2013	2017	±
Total	19.44%	22.05%	▲2.61 pp	43.43%	44.39%	▲0.96 pp	52.60%	54.96%	▲2.36 pp

== Results ==
=== Municipal Councils ===
==== National summary of votes and seats ====
Summary of the 1 October 2017 Municipal Councils elections results
Parties	Votes	%	±pp swing	Candidacies	Councillors		Mayors	
Parties	Votes	%	±pp swing	Candidacies	Total	±	Total	±
Socialist	1,956,682	37.82	▲1.5	296	952	▲29	159	▲10
Social Democratic	831,555	16.07	▼0.6	190	493	▼38	79	▼7
Unitary Democratic Coalition	489,083	9.45	▼1.6	303	171	▼42	24	▼10
Social Democratic / People's	454,222	8.78	▲1.2	73	169	▲15	16	0
Independents	351,352	6.79	▼0.1	87	130	▲18	17	▲4
Left Bloc	170,040	3.29	▲0.9	124	12	▲4	0	0
People's	134,257	2.60	▼0.4	113	41	▼6	6	▲1
PSD / CDS–PP / MPT / PPM	88,541	1.71	▲1.2	11	23	▲9	1	0
PSD / CDS–PP / PPM	75,192	1.45	▼0.4	4	15	▼6	2	0
CDS–PP / MPT / PPM	57,570	1.11	▲0.9	13	4	▲3	0	0
People–Animals–Nature	55,921	1.08	▲0.8	31	0	0	0	0
PSD / PPM	46,822	0.91	▼0.4	4	8	▼13	0	▼1
PSD / CDS–PP / MPT / PPM / PPV-CDC	36,452	0.70	—	1	5	—	0	—
Socialist / Together for the People	23,634	0.46	—	1	5	—	0	—
PS / BE / JPP / PDR / NC	23.577	0.46	▲0.1	1	6	▲1	1	0
Social Democratic / Earth	19,556	0.38	▲0.4	4	5	▲2	0	0
LIVRE / Socialist	16,409	0.32	—	1	5	—	1	—
Together for the People	14,818	0.29	—	5	6	—	1	—
We, the Citizens!	12,497	0.24	—	12	5	—	1	—
Portuguese Workers' Communist	12,387	0.24	▼0.3	18	0	0	0	0
PSD / CDS–PP / MPT	12,128	0.23	▼1.8	6	7	▼4	0	0
People's / People's Monarchist	10,286	0.20	—	12	4	—	0	—
Labour	5,681	0.11	▼0.1	26	0	0	0	0
CDS–PP / PSD/ MPT / PPM	4,862	0.09	—	1	2	—	0	—
National Renovator	4,744	0.09	▲0.0	13	0	0	0	0
PDR / Together for the People	3,643	0.07	—	4	0	—	0	—
Earth	3,370	0.07	▼0.0	13	0	▼2	0	0
Social Democratic / We, the Citizens!	2,948	0.06	—	1	2	—	0	—
Democratic Republican	2,793	0.05	—	10	0	—	0	—
People's / We, the Citizens!	2,547	0.05	—	2	0	—	0	—
People's / Social Democratic	2,287	0.04	▼0.1	4	2	▼2	0	0
Earth / PPV-CDC	2,258	0.04	—	1	0	—	0	—
PSD / PPM / MPT	1,958	0.04	▼0.9	1	2	▼5	0	0
People's / Earth	1,568	0.03	▼0.1	4	0	0	0	0
PPM / PURP	1,330	0.03	—	1	0	—	0	—
LIVRE	1,008	0.02	—	3	0	—	0	—
Socialist Alternative Movement	943	0.02	—	1	0	—	0	—
United Party of Retirees and Pensioners	760	0.02	—	2	0	—	0	—
CDS–PP / NC / PPM	661	0.01	—	2	0	—	0	—
PPV-CDC / PPM	470	0.01	—	1	0	—	0	—
People's Monarchist	364	0.01	0.0	2	0	0	0	0
Citizenship and Christian Democracy	186	0.00	—	1	0	—	0	—
CDS–PP / PSD / PPM	146	0.00	—	1	0	—	0	—
**Total valid**	**4,937,508**	**95.45**	**▲2.3**	—	**2,074**	**▼12**	**308**	**0**
Blank ballots	135,785	2.62	▼1.3					
Invalid ballots	99,734	1.93	▼1.0					
**Total**	**5,173,027**	**100.00**						
Registered voters/turnout	9,411,442	54.96	▲2.4					
Source: Autárquicas 2017 Resultados Oficiais RTP Autárquicas 2017

==== Municipality map ====
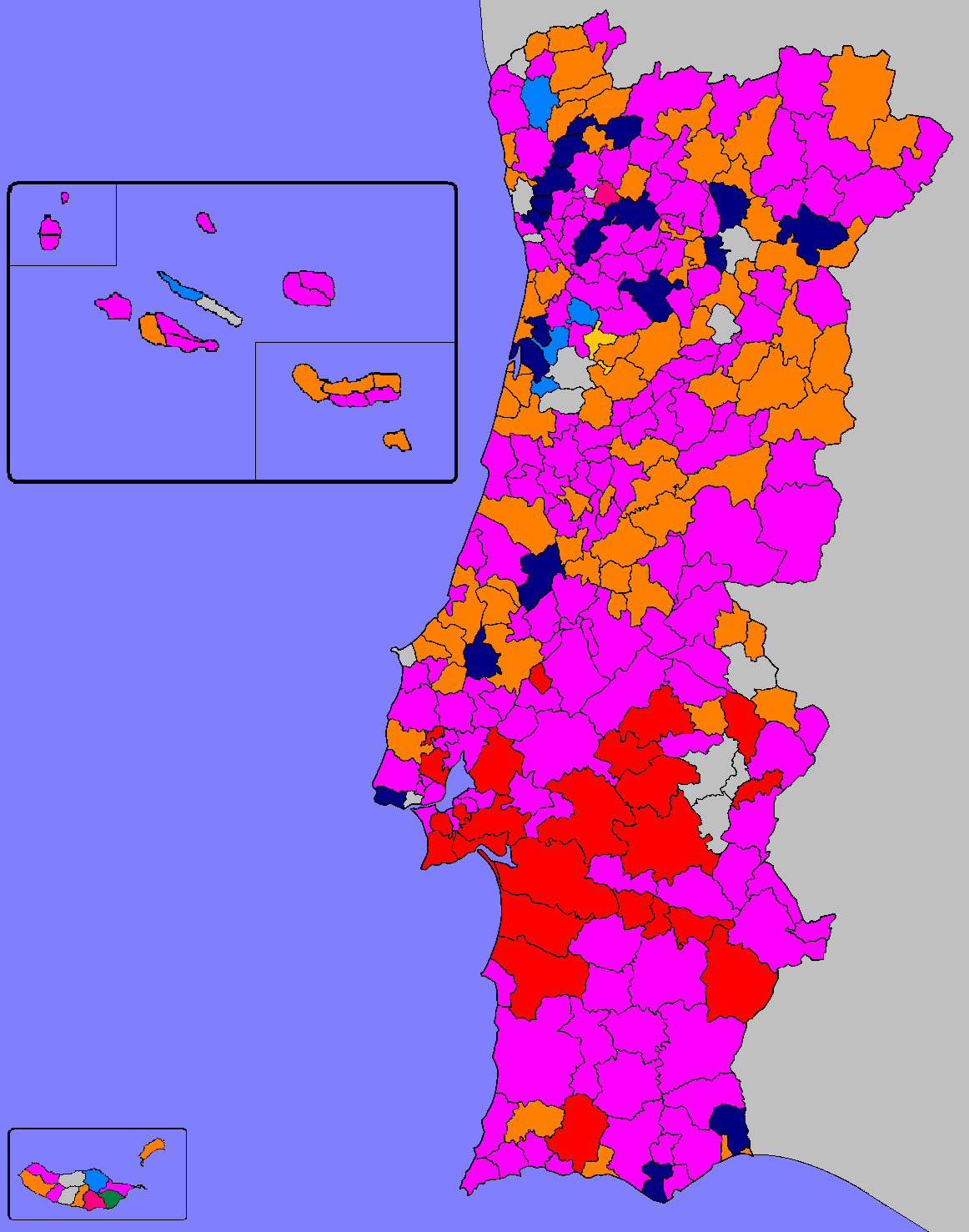
Most voted parties or coalitions in each Municipality. Municipalities won by: ■ - PS: 160 ■ - PSD: 79 ■ - CDU: 24 ■ - CDS–PP: 6 ■ - JPP: 1 ■ - NC: 1 ■ - LIVRE: 1 ■ - PSD coalitions: 19 ■ - Independents: 17

==== City control ====
The following table lists party control in all district capitals, highlighted in bold, as well as in municipalities above 100,000 inhabitants. Population estimates from 2017.

Municipality	Population	Previous control	New control
Almada	169,152	Unitary Democratic Coalition (CDU)	Socialist Party (PS)
Amadora	179,942	Socialist Party (PS)	Socialist Party (PS)
**Aveiro**	77,630	PSD / CDS–PP / PPM	PSD / CDS–PP / PPM
Barcelos	117,007	Socialist Party (PS)	Socialist Party (PS)
**Beja**	33,804	Unitary Democratic Coalition (CDU)	Socialist Party (PS)
**Braga**	181,382	PSD / CDS–PP / PPM	PSD / CDS–PP / PPM
**Bragança**	33,668	Social Democratic Party (PSD)	Social Democratic Party (PSD)
Cascais	211,714	PSD / CDS–PP	PSD / CDS–PP
**Castelo Branco**	52,703	Socialist Party (PS)	Socialist Party (PS)
**Coimbra**	134,156	Socialist Party (PS)	Socialist Party (PS)
**Évora**	52,874	Unitary Democratic Coalition (CDU)	Unitary Democratic Coalition (CDU)
**Faro**	60,920	PSD / CDS–PP / PPM / MPT	PSD / CDS–PP / PPM / MPT
**Funchal**	104,442	PS / BE / JPP / PDR / NC	PS / BE / JPP / PDR / NC
Gondomar	165,626	Socialist Party (PS)	Socialist Party (PS)
**Guarda**	39,486	Social Democratic Party (PSD)	Social Democratic Party (PSD)
Guimarães	153,294	Socialist Party (PS)	Socialist Party (PS)
**Leiria**	125,307	Socialist Party (PS)	Socialist Party (PS)
**Lisbon** (details)	506,088	Socialist Party (PS)	Socialist Party (PS)
Loures	209,442	Unitary Democratic Coalition (CDU)	Unitary Democratic Coalition (CDU)
Maia	136,769	PSD / CDS–PP	PSD / CDS–PP
Matosinhos	173,753	Independent (IND)	Socialist Party (PS)
Odivelas	157,829	Socialist Party (PS)	Socialist Party (PS)
Oeiras	175,224	Independent (IND)	Independent (IND)
**Ponta Delgada**	68,055	Social Democratic Party (PSD)	Social Democratic Party (PSD)
**Portalegre**	22,627	Independent (IND)	Independent (IND)
**Porto** (details)	214,587	Independent (IND)	Independent (IND)
**Santarém**	57,823	Social Democratic Party (PSD)	Social Democratic Party (PSD)
Santa Maria da Feira	138,613	Social Democratic Party (PSD)	Social Democratic Party (PSD)
Seixal	165,971	Unitary Democratic Coalition (CDU)	Unitary Democratic Coalition (CDU)
**Setúbal**	116,330	Unitary Democratic Coalition (CDU)	Unitary Democratic Coalition (CDU)
Sintra	386,038	Socialist Party (PS)	Socialist Party (PS)
**Viana do Castelo**	85,017	Socialist Party (PS)	Socialist Party (PS)
Vila Franca de Xira	141,227	Socialist Party (PS)	Socialist Party (PS)
Vila Nova de Famalicão	131,909	PSD / CDS–PP	PSD / CDS–PP
Vila Nova de Gaia	299,820	Socialist Party (PS)	Socialist Party (PS)
**Vila Real**	49,951	Socialist Party (PS)	Socialist Party (PS)
**Viseu**	97,423	Social Democratic Party (PSD)	Social Democratic Party (PSD)

=== Municipal Assemblies ===
==== National summary of votes and seats ====
Summary of the 1 October 2017 Municipal Assemblies elections results
Parties	Votes	%	±pp swing	Candidacies	Mandates	
Parties	Votes	%	±pp swing	Candidacies	Total	±
Socialist	1,883,679	36.42	▲1.5	297	2,731	▲72
Social Democratic	818,680	15.83	▼0.5	188	1,491	▼97
Unitary Democratic Coalition	519,831	10.05	▼1.9	301	619	▼128
Social Democratic / People's	454,186	8.78	▲1.3	73	539	▲46
Independents	333,558	6.45	▼0.0	74	396	▲44
Left Bloc	216,308	4.18	▲1.0	127	125	▲25
People's	138,782	2.68	▼0.5	99	184	▼40
PSD/ CDS–PP / MPT / PPM	86,701	1.68	▲1.2	11	73	▲36
People–Animals–Nature	73,600	1.42	▲0.9	32	26	▲19
PSD / CDS–PP / PPM	71,028	1.37	▼0.4	4	42	▼30
CDS–PP / MPT / PPM	49,210	0.95	▲0.8	13	16	▲7
PSD / PPM	48,620	0.94	▼0.3	4	26	▼16
PSD / CDS–PP / MPT / PPM / PPV-CDC	35,365	0.68	—	1	19	—
Socialist / Together for the People	22,295	0.43	—	1	13	—
PS / BE / JPP / PDR / NC	21,693	0.43	▲0.0	1	15	▲1
Social Democratic / Earth	21,019	0.42	▲0.4	4	19	▲11
LIVRE / Socialist	16,096	0.31	—	1	14	—
Together for the People	14,488	0.28	—	5	17	—
PSD / CDS–PP / MPT	13,224	0.26	▼1.9	6	24	▼18
We, the Citizens!	12,123	0.23	—	10	15	—
People's / People's Monarchist	10,600	0.20	—	11	15	—
Portuguese Workers' Communist	8,915	0.17	▼0.1	11	0	▼2
Labour	5,834	0.11	▼0.0	22	1	▼2
CDS–PP / PSD/ MPT / PPM	4,960	0.10	—	1	6	—
Earth	4,916	0.10	▼0.0	12	1	▼10
PDR / Together for the People	4,390	0.08	—	4	1	—
National Renovator	4,254	0.08	▲0.0	8	0	0
Democratic Republican	3,738	0.07	—	9	1	—
Social Democratic / We, the Citizens!	2,989	0.06	—	1	6	—
People's / We, the Citizens!	2,758	0.05	—	2	3	—
Earth / PPV-CDC	2,387	0.05	—	1	1	—
People's / Social Democratic	2,217	0.04	▼0.1	4	6	▼11
PSD / MPT / PPM	1,901	0.04	▼0.4	1	5	▼6
People's Party / Earth Party	1,459	0.03	▼0.1	4	2	▼1
PPM / PURP	1,417	0.03	—	1	0	—
United Party of Retirees and Pensioners	892	0.02	—	2	0	—
LIVRE	874	0.02	—	2	0	—
CDS–PP / NC / PPM	630	0.01	—	2	2	—
People's Monarchist	289	0.01	0.0	1	0	▼2
CDS–PP / PSD / PPM	168	0.00	—	1	0	—
People's Monarchist / People's	121	0.00	—	1	7	—
**Total valid**	**4,916,195**	**95.04**	**▲2.4**	—	**6,461**	**▼26**
Blank ballots	152,040	2.94	▼1.3			
Invalid ballots	104,500	2.02	▼1.1			
**Total**	**5,172,735**	**100.00**				
Registered voters/turnout	9,411,442	54.96	▲2.4			
Source: Autárquicas 2017 Resultados Oficiais RTP Autárquicas 2017

=== Parish Assemblies ===
==== National summary of votes and seats ====
Summary of the 1 October 2017 Parish Assemblies elections results
Parties	Votes	%	±pp swing	Candidacies	Mandates		Presidents	
Parties	Votes	%	±pp swing	Candidacies	Total	±	Total	±
Socialist	1,874,590	36.25	▲1.6	2,518	10,617	▼221	1,295	▲13
Social Democratic	809,802	15.66	▼0.7	1,638	6,629	▼298	824	▼88
Unitary Democratic Coalition	529,819	10.24	▼1.7	1,799	1,665	▼308	139	▼31
Independents	504,028	9.75	▲0.2	850	3,365	▲387	402	▲60
Social Democratic / People's	441,927	8.55	▲1.3	693	2,486	▲390	270	▲48
Left Bloc	169,580	3.28	▲1.0	454	213	▲75	0	0
People's	122,785	2.37	▼0.4	506	628	▼97	54	▲4
PSD/ CDS–PP / MPT / PPM	89,058	1.72	▲1.3	70	238	▲150	11	▲8
PSD / CDS–PP / PPM	63,515	1.23	▼0.4	56	250	▼200	28	▼16
PSD / PPM	52,697	1.02	▼0.1	45	164	▼87	14	▼7
CDS–PP / MPT / PPM	41,192	0.80	▲0.6	80	77	▲65	0	0
PSD / CDS–PP / MPT / PPM / PPV-CDC	32,414	0.63	—	44	166	—	12	—
Socialist / Together for the People	23,129	0.45	—	10	52	—	2	—
PS / BE / JPP / PDR / NC	20,428	0.40	▲0.0	10	58	▲5	5	0
Social Democratic / Earth	15,486	0.30	▲0.3	20	52	▲25	1	0
Together for the People	13,747	0.27	—	18	45	—	5	—
People–Animals–Nature	13,356	0.26	▲0.2	26	6	▲5	0	0
LIVRE / Socialist	13,216	0.26	—	11	54	—	7	—
PSD / CDS–PP / MPT	12,442	0.24	▼2.0	26	57	▼265	5	▼13
We, the Citizens!	9,090	0.18	—	28	42	—	3	—
People's / People's Monarchist	8,624	0.17	—	41	47	—	3	—
Portuguese Workers' Communist	5,059	0.10	▼0.1	24	0	▼2	0	0
CDS–PP / PSD/ MPT / PPM	4,523	0.09	—	3	9	—	0	—
PDR / Together for the People	4,476	0.07	—	22	1	—	0	—
People's Party / Social Democratic	4,223	0.08	▼0.0	10	25	▼38	2	▼3
Earth	4,072	0.08	▼0.0	29	7	▼11	0	0
Labour	3,813	0.07	▲0.0	64	0	▼1	0	0
People's / We, the Citizens!	3,056	0.06	—	17	19	—	1	—
Social Democratic / We, the Citizens!	2,653	0.05	—	6	14	—	0	—
Earth / PPV-CDC	2,132	0.04	—	10	0	—	0	—
Democratic Republican	1,903	0.04	—	21	4	—	0	—
PSD / MPT / PPM	1,739	0.03	▼0.2	5	12	▼27	0	▼2
National Renovator	1,685	0.03	▲0.0	20	0	0	0	0
People's Party / Earth Party	1,181	0.02	▼0.0	12	2	▼2	0	0
PPM / PURP	668	0.01	—	3	0	—	0	—
CDS–PP / NC / PPM	626	0.01	—	15	9	—	0	—
LIVRE	457	0.01	—	7	2	—	0	—
United Party of Retirees and Pensioners	271	0.01	—	4	0	—	0	—
People's Monarchist	262	0.01	0.0	4	1	▼10	0	0
Socialist Alternative Movement	202	0.00	—	1	0	—	0	—
**Total valid**	**4,903,926**	**92.99**	**▲1.8**	—	**27,005**	**▼162**	**3,083**	**▼2**
Blank ballots	152,337	2.95	▼0.9					
Invalid ballots	115,317	2.23	▼0.9					
**Total**	**5,171,580**	**100.00**						
Registered voters/turnout	9,410,569	54.95	▲2.4					
Source: Autárquicas 2017 Resultados Oficiais RTP Autárquicas 2017

== See also ==
- Politics of Portugal
- List of political parties in Portugal
- Elections in Portugal
