= National Ballet of Portugal =

Ballet company

Companhia Nacional de Bailado (CNB), the National Ballet Company of Portugal, was established in Lisbon in 1977 and the Teatro Nacional de São Carlos was its home for the first two decades of its existence. CNB is the only state company in Portugal that has a dance season and is the only company with a permanent group of artists that currently ensure regular seasons at the Teatro Camões as well as touring the country (including the Madeira and Azores islands) and abroad.

== Goals ==
Established through government initiative, the company has two aims that complement each other. One is the preservation and presentation of international ballet repertoire, performing classical ballet productions; the other is the permanent update of this art form, presenting modern and contemporary choreography by national and foreign authors. The result is an extremely eclectic repertoire which crosses centuries, styles and techniques while keeping a strong Portuguese and European identity.

== History ==
CNB was the first ballet company in Portugal to produce full-length classical ballets such as La fille mal gardée, Swan Lake, Don Quixote, La Sylphide, La Bayadère, Paquita, Coppélia, Romeo and Juliet, The Firebird and The Rite of Spring. In addition, the company reviews and re-deciphers works from the ballet canon, commissioning new pieces by creators who reinterpret them with a contemporary outlook, often in dialogue with Portugal's history.

CNB performances include works by prominent international choreographers such as George Balanchine, Vaslav Nijinsky, Serge Lifar, Kurt Jooss, José Limón, Lar Lubovitch, Michael Corder, Hans van Manen, Robert North, Heinz Spöerli, Nacho Duato, Mauro Bigonzetti, Henri Oguike, Cayetano Soto, Ohad Naharin, William Forsythe, Anne Teresa de Keersmaeker and Akram Khan, as well as Portuguese choreographers such as Armando Jorge, Fernando Lima, Carlos Trincheiras, Rui Lopes Graça, Olga Roriz, Vasco Wellenkamp, Paulo Ribeiro, Rui Horta, Clara Andermatt or Fernando Duarte.

=== Artistic directors ===
Paulo Ribeiro is the artistic director of the company, succeeding Luísa Taveira (2010–2016 and 1999–2000), Vasco Wellenkamp (2007–2010), Mehmet Balkan (2002–2007), Marc Jonkers (2001–2002), Jorge Salavisa (1996–1999), Isabel Santa Rosa (1994–1996) and Armando Jorge (1978–1993). CNB is based at Rua Vítor Cordon, in Chiado, Lisbon.
