= 2017 Lisbon local election =

2017 Lisbon local elections
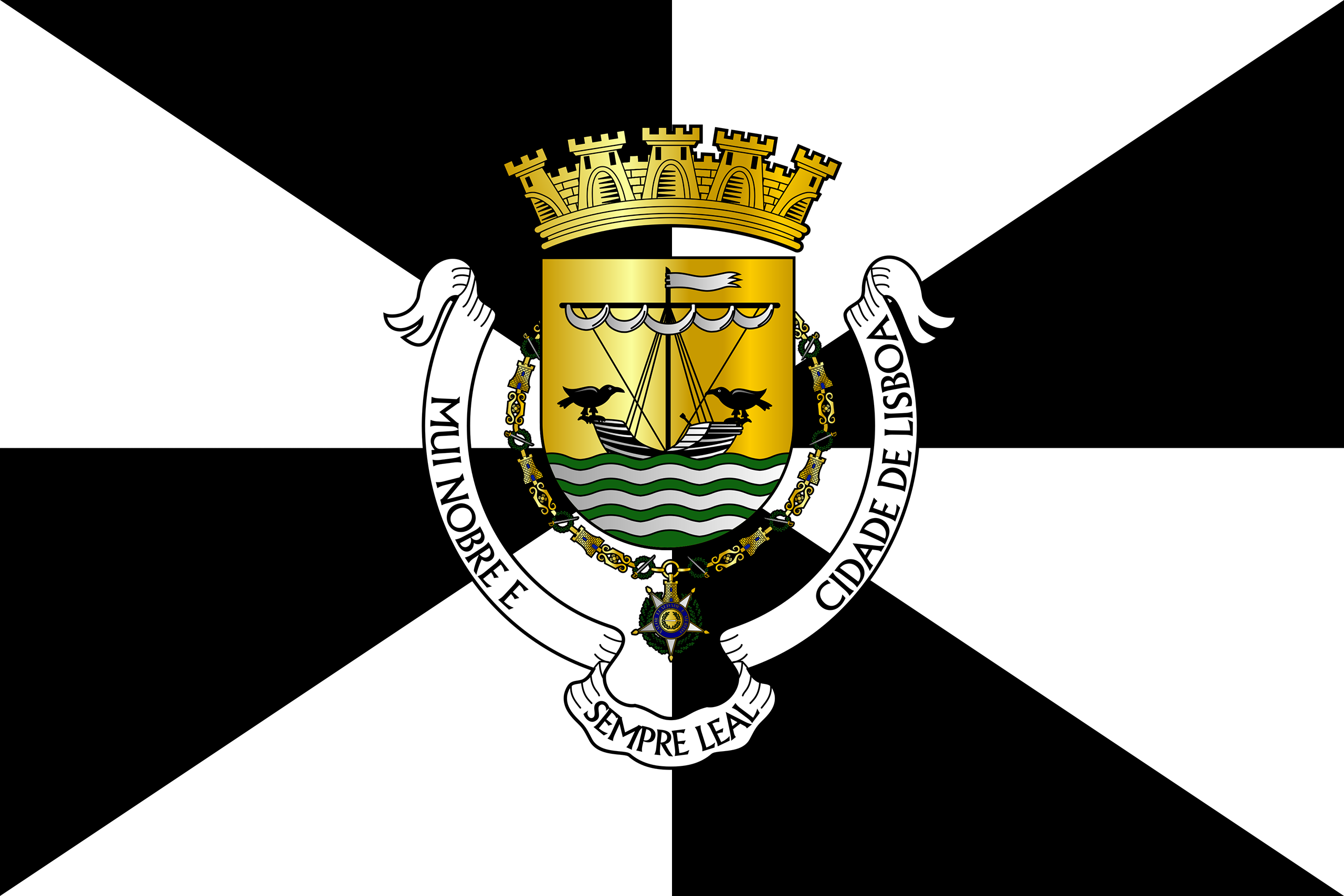
- 1 October 2017

All 17 Councillors in the Lisbon City Council 9 seats needed for a majority
- Opinion polls
- Turnout: 51.2% ▲6.1 pp
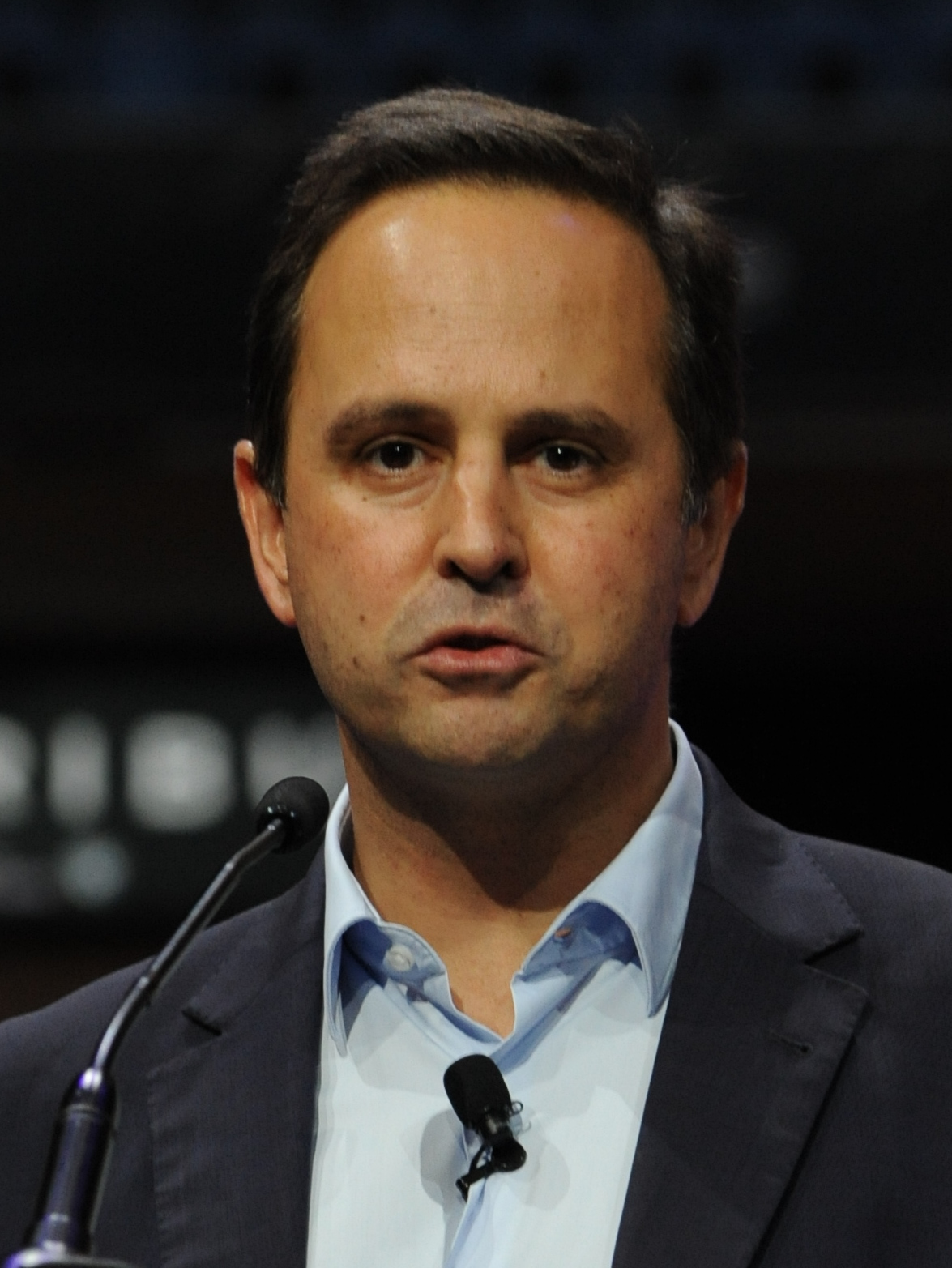

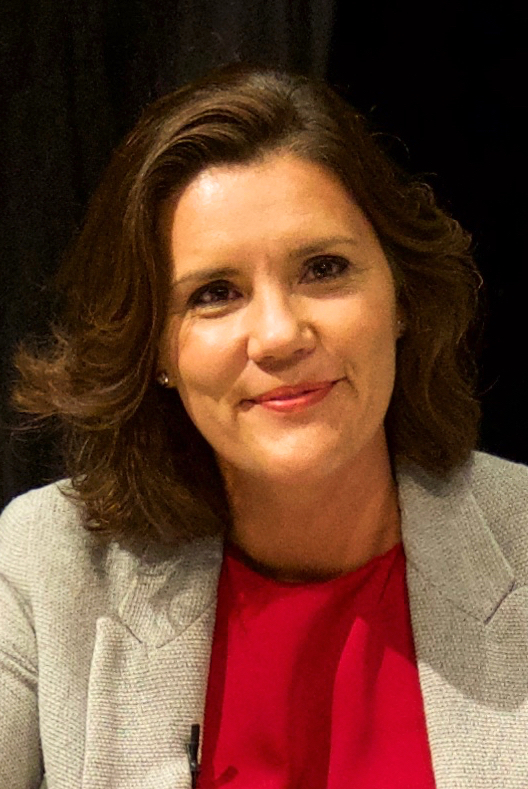

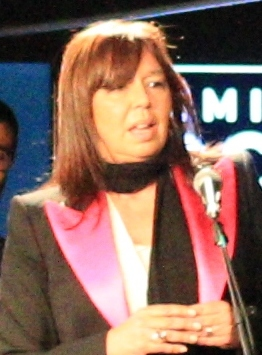

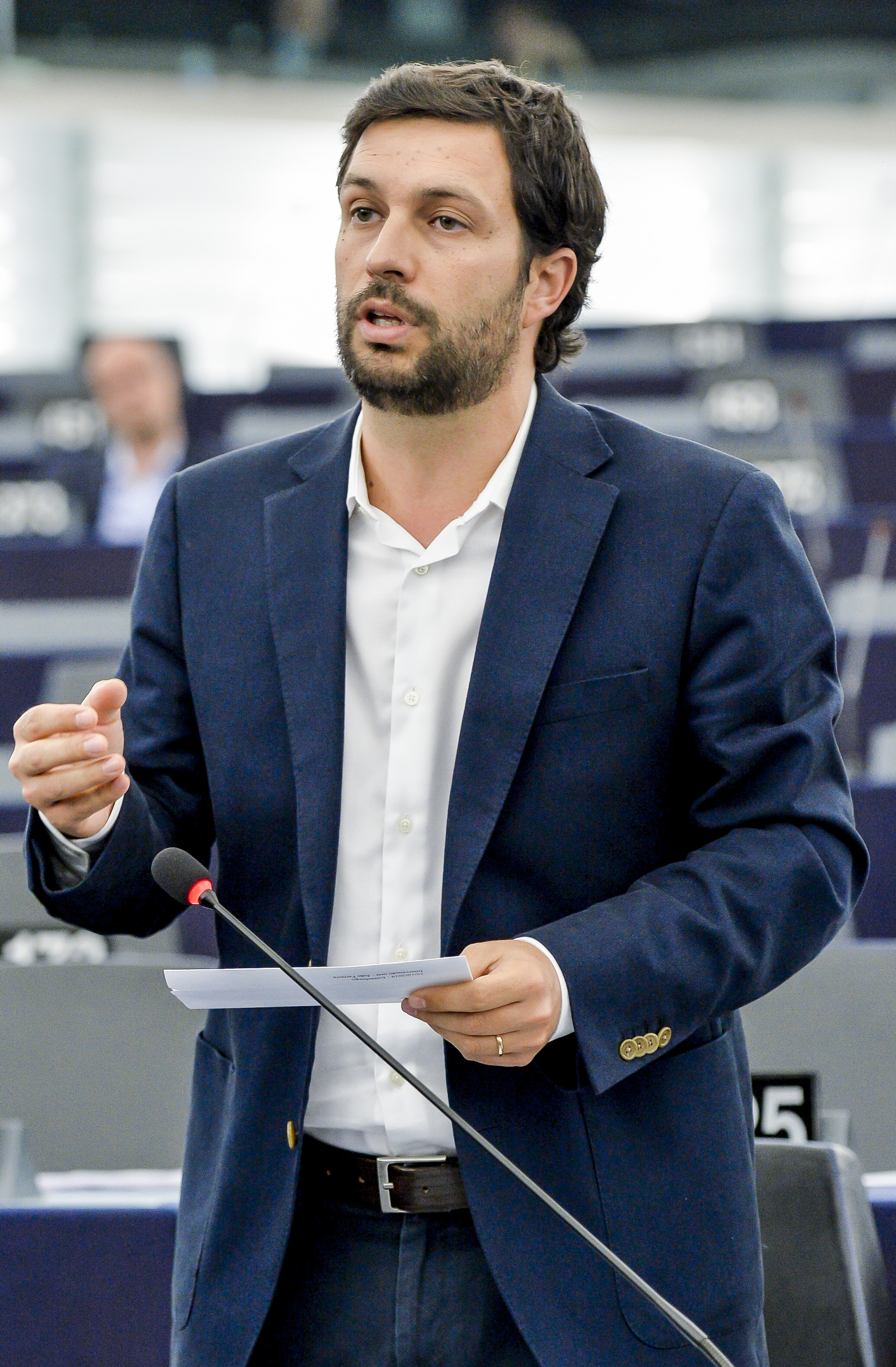

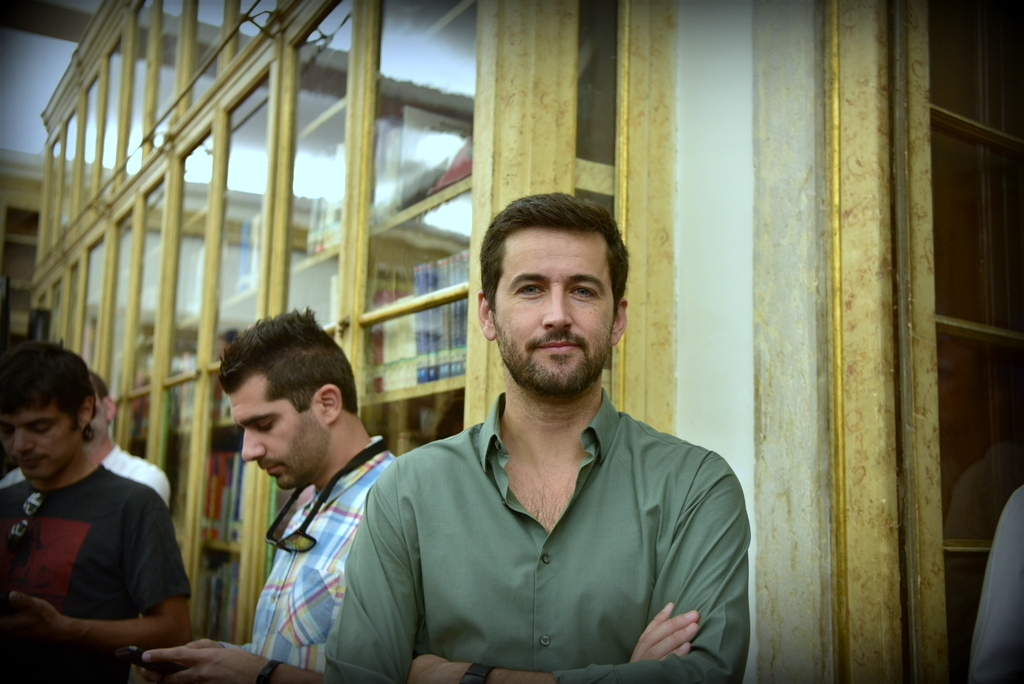

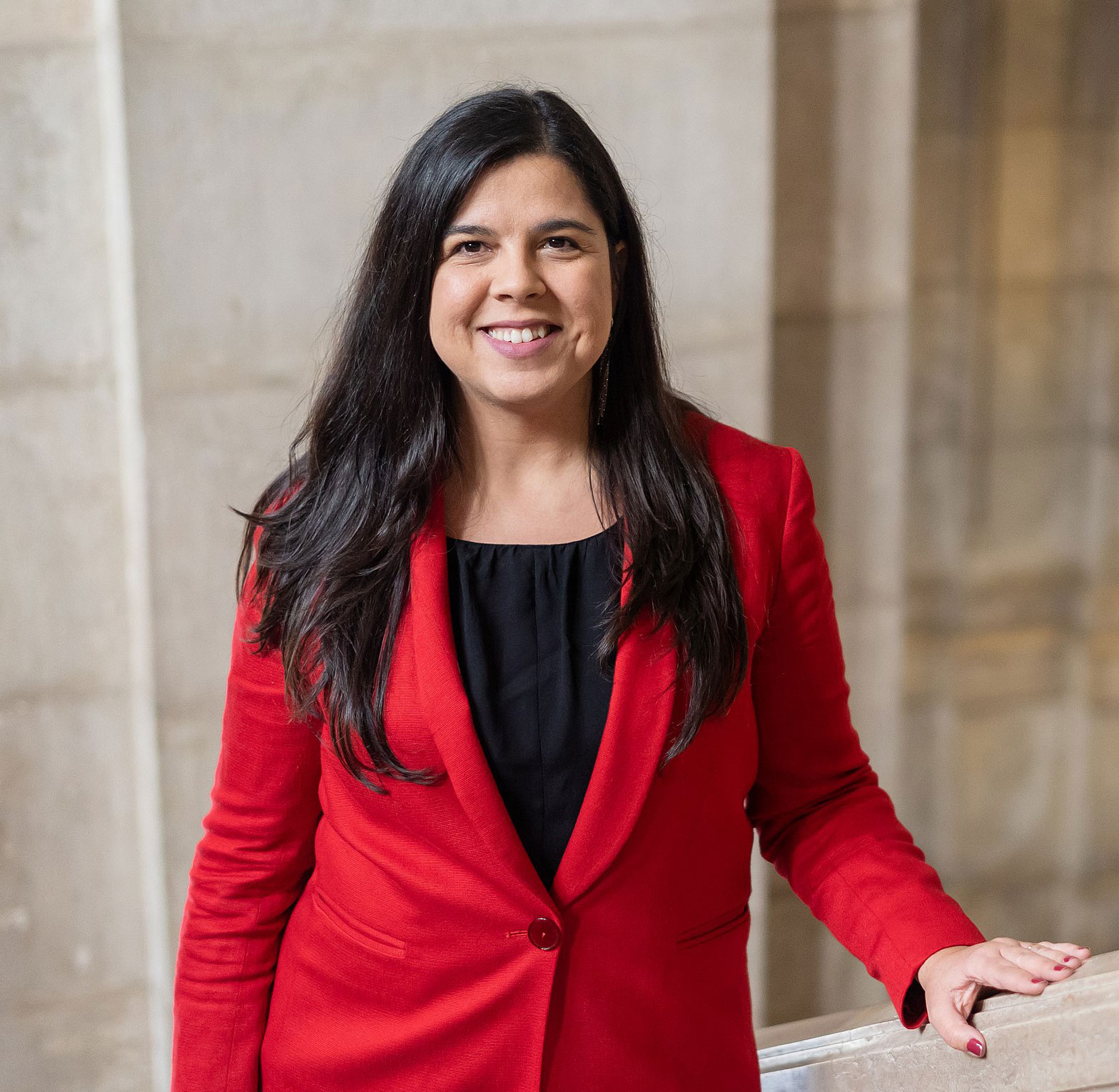
	First party	Second party	Third party
Leader	Fernando Medina	Assunção Cristas	Teresa Leal Coelho
Party	PS	CDS–PP	PSD
Alliance		Our Lisbon (Note: Coalition with CDS–PP, MPT and PPM.)
Last election	11 seats, 50.9%	1 seat (SL) (Note: PSD and CDS-PP ran together in 2013, receiving 4 seats and 22.4% of the votes.)	3 seats (SL)
Seats won	8	4	2
Seat change	▼3	▲3	▼1
Popular vote	106,037	51,984	28,336
Percentage	42.0%	20.6%	11.2%
Swing	▼8.9 pp
	Fourth party	Fifth party	Sixth party
Leader	João Ferreira	Ricardo Robles	Inês Sousa Real
Party	PCP	BE	PAN
Alliance	CDU
Last election	2 seats, 9.8%	0 seats, 4.6%	0 seats, 2.3%
Seats won	2	1	0
Seat change	Steady	▲1	Steady
Popular vote	24,110	18,025	7,658
Percentage	9.5%	7.1%	3.0%
Swing	▼0.3 pp	▲2.5 pp	▲0.7 pp
Valid votes per parish
Fernando Medina (PS)
30–39%
40-49%
50-59%
Assunção Cristas (CDS)
30–39%
Mayor before election
Fernando Medina
PS
Elected Mayor
Fernando Medina
PS

The 2017 Lisbon local election was held on 1 October 2017 to elect the members of the Lisbon City Council.

Against a fractured opposition, Fernando Medina, mayor since the resignation of António Costa in 2015, was elected for a full term, defeating Assunção Cristas (CDS-PP leader) and Teresa Leal Coelho (PSD). Despite the victory, the Socialist Party lost its majority by one seat, having to rely of the Left Bloc's support.

The Unitary Democratic Coalition presented former MEP João Ferreira again and achieved similar results, and that guaranteed two Communist councilors. The Left Bloc, with Ricardo Robles as the candidate for Mayor, managed to gain a councillor seat for the first time in 10 years.

People-Animals-Nature, with Inês Sousa Real as its candidate, failed to elect any councilor.

== Background ==
In the 2013 election, the Socialist Party led by António Costa, won with an absolute majority. The PSD-CDS coalition led by Fernando Seara got about 22 percent of the votes, the worse result for the center right ever in Lisbon.

In 2014, Costa won the Socialist primary and became the leader of the Socialist Party. He resigned to focus on the campaign for the 2015 legislative elections, being replaced by Fernando Medina.

== Electoral system ==
Each party or coalition must present a list of candidates. The winner of the most voted list for the municipal council is automatically elected mayor, similar to first-past-the-post (FPTP). The lists are closed and the seats in each municipality are apportioned according to the D'Hondt method. Unlike in national legislative elections, independent lists are allowed to run.

== Parties and candidates ==
Party/Coalition		Political position	Candidate	2013 result	
Party/Coalition		Political position	Candidate	Votes (%)	Seats
PS	Socialist Party; Partido Socialista	Centre-left	Fernando Medina	50.9%	11 / 17
PPD/PSD	Social Democratic Party; Partido Social Democrata	Centre-right	Teresa Leal Coelho	22.4%	3 / 17
NL	Our Lisbon; Nossa Lisboa CDS–PP, MPT, PPM	Right-wing	Assunção Cristas	22.4%	1 / 17
CDU	Unitary Democratic Coalition; Coligação Democrática Unitária PCP, PEV	Left-wing to far-left	João Ferreira	9.9%	2 / 17
BE	Left Bloc; Bloco de Esquerda	Left-wing to far-left	Ricardo Robles	4.6%	0 / 17
PAN	People Animals Nature; Pessoas-Animais-Natureza	Centre-left	Inês Sousa Real	2.3%	0 / 17
PCTP	Portuguese Workers' Communist Party; Partido Comunista dos Trabalhadores Portugueses	Far-left	Luís Júdice	1.0%	0 / 17
PNR	National Renovator Party; Partido Nacional Renovador	Far-right	José Pinto Coelho	0.5%	0 / 17
PTP	Portuguese Labour Party; Partido Trabalhista Português	Centre-left	Amândio Madaleno	0.3%	0 / 17
NC	We, the Citizens! Nós, Cidadãos!	Centre-right	Joana Amaral Dias	—N/a	—N/a
LS	Lisbon Yes; Lisboa Sim PDR, JPP	Centre	Carlos Teixeira	—N/a	—N/a
PURP	United Party of Retirees and Pensioners; Partido Unido dos Reformados e Pensionistas	Centre	António Arruda	—N/a	—N/a

== Campaign period ==
=== Candidates' debates ===
2017 Lisbon local election debates
Date	Organisers	Moderator(s)	P Present A Absent invitee N Non-invitee												
Date	Organisers	Moderator(s)	PS Medina	NL Cristas	PSD L. Coelho	CDU Ferreira	BE Robles	PAN S. Real	NC A. Dias	PCTP Júdice	PNR P. Coelho	LS Teixeira	PURP Arruda	PTP Madaleno	Refs
30 August 2017	SIC, SIC Notícias	Rodrigo Guedes de Carvalho	P	P	P	P	P	N	N	N	N	N	N	N	
6 September 2017	TVI, TVI24	Judite Sousa	P	P	P	P	P	N	N	N	N	N	N	N	
8 September 2017	CMTV	José Carlos Castro	P	P	P	P	P	N	N	N	N	N	N	N	
11 September 2017	Rádio Renascença	Sérgio Costa	P	P	P	P	P	P	N	N	N	N	N	N	
14 September 2017	RTP1, RTP3	António José Teixeira	P	P	P	P	P	P	P	P	P	P	P	P	

== Opinion polling ==
Exit poll

Polling firm/Link	Fieldwork date	Sample size	PS	PSD	CDS PPM MPT	CDU	BE	PAN	O	Lead
2017 local election	1 October 2017	—N/a	42.0; 8	11.2; 2	20.6; 4	9.6; 2	7.1; 1	3.0; 0	6.4; 0	21.4
UCP–CESOP	1 October 2017	11,694	43– 47; 8/10	9– 11; 2	18– 21; 3/4	9– 11; 2	7– 9; 1/2	–	–	25– 26
Eurosondagem	1 October 2017	8,761	41.4– 46.0; 9	8.4– 11.0; 1/2	16.2– 20.0; 3/4	10.0– 12.1; 2	7.7– 9.6; 1/2	–	–	25.2– 26.0
Intercampus	1 October 2017	5,238	44.3– 49.3; 8/9	8.1– 12.0; 1/2	15.5– 19.5; 3/4	8.3– 12.3; 1/2	6.2– 9.2; 1	1.7– 4.7; 0	2.9– 5.9; 0	28.8– 29.8
CESOP–UCP	23–26 Sep 2017	1,292	47; 8/10	12; 2	15; 2/3	8; 1/2	8; 1/2	3; 0	7; 0	32
Eurosondagem	22–26 Sep 2017	1,148	43.3; 9	12.5; 2	17.5; 3	10.1; 2	5.7; 1	—N/a	10.9; 0	25.8
Aximage	17–20 Sep 2017	600	47.0; 9/10	10.9; 2/3	12.6; 2/3	8.5; 2	5.5; 1	—N/a	15.5; 0	34.4
CESOP–UCP	16 September 2017	642	41; 7/9	16; 3/4	17; 3/4	8; 1/2	8; 1/2	3; 0	7; 0	24
2015 legislative election	4 October 2015	—N/a	34.8 (7)	38.1 (8)		7.9 (1)	9.4 (1)	1.9 (0)	7.9 (0)	3.3
2014 EP election	25 May 2014	—N/a	29.2 (6)	34.1 (7)		13.6 (3)	5.3 (1)	2.4 (0)	15.4 (0)	4.9
2013 local election	29 September 2013	—N/a	50.9; 11	22.4; 4		9.9; 2	4.6; 0	2.3; 0	3.1	28.5

== Results ==
=== Municipal Council ===
Summary of the 1 October 2017 Lisbon City Council elections results
Graph of the party split among 17 seats.
Parties	Votes	%	±pp swing	Councillors	
Parties	Votes	%	±pp swing	Total	±
Socialist	106,036	42.00	▼8.9	8	▼3
CDS–PP / MPT / PPM	51,984	20.59	—N/a	4	▲3
Social Democratic	28,336	11.22	—N/a	2	▼1
Unitary Democratic Coalition	24,110	9.55	▼0.3	2	0
Left Bloc	18,025	7.14	▲2.5	1	▲1
People–Animals–Nature	7,658	3.03	▲0.7	0	0
We, the Citizens!	1,497	0.59	—N/a	0	—N/a
Portuguese Workers' Communist	1,309	0.52	▼0.5	0	0
National Renovator	1,179	0.47	▼0.1	0	0
PDR / JPP	809	0.32	—N/a	0	—N/a
United Party of Retirees and Pensioners	687	0.27	—N/a	0	—N/a
Labour	352	0.14	▼0.2	0	0
Total valid	241,982	95.84	▲2.7	17	0
Blank ballots	6,627	2.62	▼1.4		
Invalid ballots	3,871	1.53	▼1.3		
Total	252,481	100.00			
Registered voters/turnout	493,354	51.16	▲6.1		
Source: Lisbon 2017 election results

=== Municipal Assembly ===
Summary of the 1 October 2017 Lisbon Municipal Assembly elections results
Graph of the party split among 52 seats.
Parties	Votes	%	±pp swing	Seats	
Parties	Votes	%	±pp swing	Total	±
Socialist	95,064	37.66	▼4.7	22	▼3
CDS–PP / MPT / PPM	42,773	16.94	—N/a	9	▲6
Social Democratic	38,263	15.16	—N/a	8	▼3
Unitary Democratic Coalition	26,229	10.39	▼0.8	7	▼1
Left Bloc	21,288	8.43	▲1.5	4	0
People–Animals–Nature	10,811	4.28	▲1.3	2	▲1
Portuguese Workers' Communist	1,875	0.74	▼0.5	0	0
National Renovator	1,442	0.57	▼0.0	0	0
We, the Citizens!	1,383	0.55	—N/a	0	—N/a
PDR / JPP	854	0.34	—N/a	0	—N/a
United Party of Retirees and Pensioners	834	0.33	—N/a	0	—N/a
Labour	429	0.17	▼0.2	0	0
Total valid	241,245	95.56	▲2.9	51	0
Blank ballots	7,327	2.90	▼1.4		
Invalid ballots	3,877	1.54	▼1.4		
Total	252,449	100.00			
Registered voters/turnout	493,354	51.15	▲6.0		
Source: Lisbon 2017 election results

=== Parish Assemblies ===
Results of the 1 October 2017 Lisbon Parish Assembly elections
Parish	%	S	%	S	%	S	%	S	%	S	%	S	%	S	Total S
Parish	PS		PSD		NL		CDU		BE		PAN		IND		Total S
Ajuda	51.2	8	10.6	1	7.7	1	18.1	2	7.8	1					13
Alcântara	58.6	10	11.6	1	10.8	1	9.8	1	5.5	–					13
Alvalade	36.2	8	20.6	4	18.4	4	8.6	2	6.6	1	4.1	–			19
Areeiro	28.9	4	29.8	4	17.9	3	6.9	1	6.5	1	4.4	–			13
Arroios	39.9	9	15.2	3	12.0	2	9.9	2	10.4	2	5.2	1			19
Avenidas Novas	29.3	6	22.3	5	27.4	6	6.9	1	5.5	1	4.0	–			19
Beato	51.0	8	11.3	1	8.8	1	11.7	2	7.0	1	4.0	–			13
Belém	29.2	4	32.9	5	21.3	3	6.7	1	5.7	–					13
Benfica	49.5	11	16.6	3	9.7	2	9.2	2	7.2	1	3.4	–			19
Campo de Ourique	38.5	8	19.4	4	17.0	3	10.2	2	9.6	2					19
Campolide	55.9	8	11.4	1	12.5	2	9.5	1	6.3	1					13
Carnide	22.6	3	13.4	2	9.1	1	44.8	7	5.3	–					13
Estrela	27.1	4	34.8	5	18.0	3	7.8	1	4.8	–	3.7	–			13
Lumiar	40.4	9	18.8	4	19.0	4	8.3	1	6.6	1					19
Marvila	47.3	11	9.0	2	6.2	1	14.6	3	7.3	1			5.8	1	19
Misericórdia	43.1	6	12.9	2	14.3	2	12.6	2	11.3	1					13
Olivais	53.5	12	12.6	3	7.8	1	10.6	2	6.5	1	3.8	–			19
Parque das Nações	38.4	6	13.0	2	23.1	4	9.9	1	4.9	–	4.9	–			13
Penha de França	42.0	9	15.6	3	7.8	1	12.9	3	10.3	2	5.5	1			19
Santa Clara	34.3	5	15.0	2	7.6	1	13.7	2	6.3	1	3.2	–	13.3	2	13
Santa Maria Maior	50.6	8	9.9	1	9.6	1	14.4	2	10.2	1					13
Santo António	27.6	4	31.3	5	18.7	2	8.7	1	9.1	1					13
São Domingos de Benfica	39.2	9	21.6	5	15.7	3	8.1	1	6.4	1	4.1	–			19
São Vicente	35.1	5	12.4	2	6.7	1	20.1	3	10.4	1			8.8	1	13
Total	40.3	175	17.9	70	14.0	53	11.5	46	7.2	22	2.4	2	1.0	4	372
Source: Election Results

== Maps ==
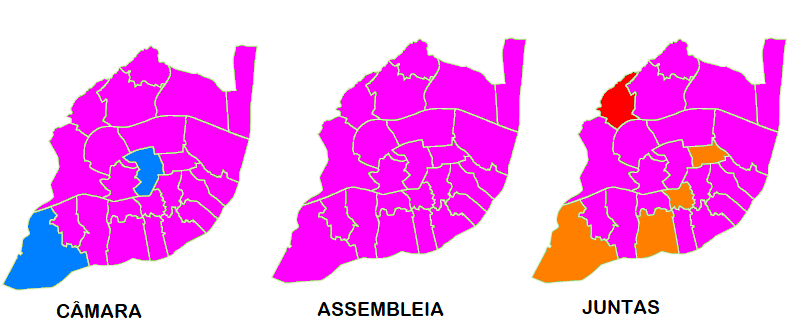
Most voted party by Parish.
