= Tutti Frutti scandal =

Corruption scandal in the Portuguese government

Caso Tutti Frutti
- Description: Political scandal that made public influence peddling between executives and members of the Socialist Party and Social Democratic Party
- Date: May 23, 2023 – ongoing
- Publishers: CNN Portugal, TVI
- Documents: Tutti Frutti scandal

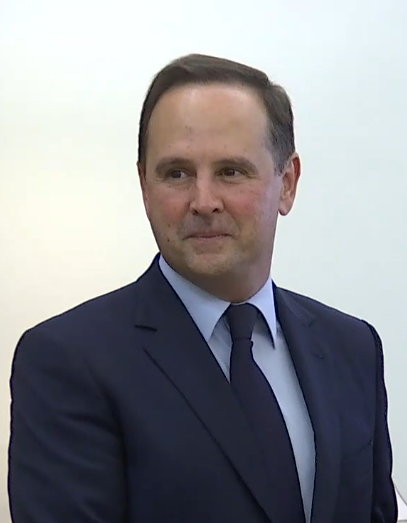
Fernando Medina

The Tutti Frutti scandal (in pt: Caso Tutti Frutti) is an investigation and political scandal that took place in Portugal in May 2023, which made public influence peddling between executives and members of the Socialist Party and Social Democratic Party in the preparation of lists for the 2017 Portuguese municipal elections. Among the main people involved were Fernando Medina, as former mayor of Lisbon, the Minister of the Environment Duarte Cordeiro and former PSD deputy Sérgio Azevedo.

The Public Ministry formally assumes suspicions for various crimes, advanced by CNN Portugal and TVI.

== Investigation ==
The alleged acts of corruption involve the alleged economic participation in businesses as well as the financing of parties, prevarication of political office holders, influence peddling and abuse of power.

Through dozens of telephone tappings as well as hundreds of emails seized from Medina "with criminal relevance", according to TVI, the evidence of the Judiciary Police and the prosecutor Andrea Marques in relation to the cases under investigation, where Duarte Cordeiro, incumbent Minister for the Environment – Medina's number 2 in the Lisbon Chamber – is considered suspect. The “political agreements between Sérgio Azevedo (from the Social Democratic Party), Duarte Cordeiro and Medina (from the Socialist Party) for the placement of people in places for alliances and strategic positions”, in 2017.

Subsequently, the Public Prosecutor's magistrate advances that the “issuance of false invoices and agreements with PS officials for the award of public contracts to companies violating transparency, integrity, zeal and good management of public funds”. In the Tutti Frutti process, hundreds of eavesdropping and surveillance expose alleged schemes of a central block of interests between Socialist Party and Social Democratic Party. A regime pact described by the PJ in a case that started with local mayors and senior officials, but which extended to the socialist summit in the Lisbon Chamber, in 2017. friends companies in direct adjustments. These schemes were only possible through the control of certain Parish Councils in the Capital – some belonging to the PSD, such as Estrela, Santo António or Areeiro; and others from Socialist Party.

According to the thesis of the investigation, Fernando Medina would have made a secret agreement, or non-aggression pact, with PSD officials, six months before the elections, in order to present “bad candidates”, an expression derived from a telephone tapping of Sérgio Azevedo, from the Social Democratic Party). In this process, Sérgio Azevedo also appears on the phone to say that he was “owing favors to Medina” for the 200 thousand euros that the Chamber gave to Belenenses Rugby, for the construction of a field whose award Azevedo wanted to hand over to the company of a friend, Carlos Eduardo Reis, now Social Democratic Party deputy.
