= Clara Andermatt =

Portuguese dancer and choreographer

- Born: 1963 (age 62–63); Lisbon, Portugal
- Occupations: Dancer and choreographer

Clara Andermatt (born 1963) is a Portuguese contemporary dancer and choreographer.

== Training ==
Clara Andermatt was born in 1963 in the Portuguese capital of Lisbon. Her mother, Luna Andermatt (1926—2013), was a dancer, dancing teacher and choreographer, and one of the founders of the National Ballet of Portugal. Clara, who had a sister and a brother, started to join her mother's dance classes at the age of three. In 1980 she went to London to study at the British dance and theatre school, the London Studio Centre. She won the Best Student Award there in 1983, obtaining a degree in 1984, and also obtained a diploma from the Royal Academy of Dance. She later received several scholarships from the United States, taking a theatre course in New York with Mervyn Nelson, studying dance with Jacob's Pillow Dance in Massachusetts in 1988, and training with the American Dance Festival at the Durham Performing Arts Center in North Carolina in 1994, and at the Bates Dance Festival, in Maine in 2002.

== Professional career ==
Andermatt joined the Companhia de Dança de Lisboa (Lisbon Dance Company), formed by Rui Horta in 1987, but left with Rui Horta in 1988 when he formed Rui Horta & Friends. In 1989 she moved to Barcelona, joining Ramon Oller's Companhia Metros. In Barcelona she started to choreograph professionally, winning the 1st Prize at the 3rd Certamen Coreográfico de Madrid for the work En-Fim. In 1991, she founded her own company in Lisbon, Companhia Clara Andermatt, producing in the same year Louca-Louca Sensação De Viver for the ACARTE (Animação, Criação Artística e Educação pela Arte) Festival. The work of her company came to be referred to as Nova Dança Portuguesa (New Portuguese Dance), which was characterised by an absence of any particular style, the use of new movement techniques, introduction of elements of theatricality, and presentations in unconventional places.

In 1994, Lisbon was the European Capital of Culture, and Andermatt was invited, together with choreographer Paulo Ribeiro, to produce work inspired by Cape Verde, a former Portuguese colony. This led to a long collaboration with the local artistic community of that country, which led to Dançar Cabo Verde (1994), Project CV Sabe [1995), Anomalies Magneticas (1995), Uma Histórias da Dúvida (1997) and Dau Dau (1999). Andermatt returned to Praia, the capital of Cape Verde, in 2009 to work with the dance company Raiz di Polon.

During her career, Andermatt has worked with a wide variety of other dance companies in addition to her own, including: Ballet Gulbenkian; Companhia Maior; Grupo Dançar Com A Diferença; Companhia Portuguesa de Bailado Contemporâneo; and the National Ballet of Portugal. Her shows continue to be regularly performed in Portugal and in other countries. Companhia Clara Andermatt, presents dance performances but also attaches considerable importance to training of performers and supporting other bodies with training. It has also worked with disabled people. The company has received funding from Portugal's Ministry of Culture since 2001. From its foundation to 2020 it had produced about 50 pieces choreographed by Andermatt, which have been performed in more than 15 countries. She is regularly asked to choreograph theatrical performances and films.
