= Instituto de Odivelas =

Institute of Odivelas (Prince Alfonse)
- Instituto de Odivelas (Infante Dom Afonso)
- Motto: Duc in altum
- Motto in English: Launch out into the deep, Luke 5:4
- Type: Military academy
- Established: 14 January 1900
- Affiliations: Portuguese Army
- Director (last): Colonel António Luís Niza Pato
- Students: 280
- Location: Odivelas, Portugal; 38.7912702°N 9.184071°W
- Nickname: As Meninas de Odivelas (The Odivelas Girls)
- Website: www.institutodivelas.com

The Instituto de Odivelas (IO) was a Portuguese military school for young girls, located at Odivelas. It was founded in 1900 and closed in 2015. The last official full name of the school was Instituto de Odivelas (Infante Dom Afonso) (Portuguese for "Institute of Odivelas (Prince Alfonse)").

== Academics ==
The IO provided basic and secondary education (5th to 12th grades), both in the boarding school and day-school regimes.

Military training was available as part of the school curriculum, but only as an optional course.

== History ==
The institution was created in 1900, by the initiative of Prince Alfonse, brother of King Charles I of Portugal, with the objective of educating the daughters of the officers of the Portuguese Army and Navy. It was installed in the building of the former Monastery of Saint Denis of Odivelas.

Initially, it was named Instituto Infante Dom Afonso (Prince Alfonse Institute). In 1910, it was renamed Instituto Torre e Espada (Tower and Sword Institute) and, in 1911, Instituto Feminino de Educação e Trabalho (Feminine Institute of Education and Labor). In 1942, it became the Instituto de Odivelas and, in 1988, the last name was adopted.

In a controversial decision taken in 2013, the Minister of National Defense José Pedro Aguiar-Branco ordered in the closing of the IO in the end of the school year of 2014/2015. Their students are being integrated in the Military College, which was transformed from a boys' school into a mixed gender school. This decision is being opposed by the former students and parents organizations of both schools.

== Alumni ==
Alumni include:

- Luna Andermatt, ballet dancer
- Rosa Lobato de Faria, actor
- Teresa Leal Coelho, politician
- Isabel Gago, Portugal's first female chemical engineer
