= Fernando Medina =

Portuguese economist and politician (born 1973)

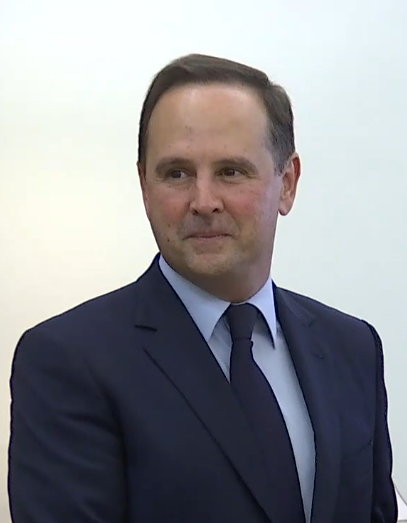
- Medina in 2023

Minister of Finance
- In office 30 March 2022 – 2 April 2024
- Prime Minister: António Costa
- Preceded by: João Leão
- Succeeded by: Joaquim Miranda Sarmento

Mayor of Lisbon
- In office 6 April 2015 – 18 October 2021
- Preceded by: António Costa
- Succeeded by: Carlos Moedas

Deputy Mayor of Lisbon
- In office 24 October 2013 – 6 April 2015
- Mayor: António Costa
- Preceded by: Manuel Salgado
- Succeeded by: Duarte Cordeiro

Secretary of State Assistant for Industry and Development
- In office 31 October 2009 – 21 June 2011
- Prime Minister: José Sócrates
- Preceded by: António Castro Guerra
- Succeeded by: António Almeida Henriques

Secretary of State for Employment and Vocational Training
- In office 14 March 2005 – 26 October 2009
- Prime Minister: José Sócrates
- Preceded by: Luís Pais Antunes
- Succeeded by: Valter Lemos

Member of the Assembly of the Republic
- In office 29 March 2022 – 18 May 2025
- Constituency: Lisbon
- In office 20 June 2011 – 24 October 2013
- Constituency: Viana do Castelo
- In office 15 October 2009 – 31 October 2009
- Constituency: Beja

Personal details
- Born: Fernando Medina Maciel Almeida Correia; 10 March 1973 (age 53) Porto, Portugal
- Party: Socialist
- Spouse: Stéphanie Silva
- Children: 3
- Education: University of Porto

Fernando Medina Maciel Almeida Correia (born 10 March 1973) is a Portuguese economist and politician Socialist Party (PS) who served as Minister of Finance in the government of Prime Minister António Costa from 2022 to 2024. He previously served as Mayor of Lisbon from 2015, succeeding Costa, to 2021.

== Early life and education ==
Medina was born in Porto to Edgar Marciel Almeida Correia and Maria Helena Guimarães Medina. He has a degree in Economics from the Faculty of Economics of the University of Porto. He also holds a master's degree in Economic Sociology from the Instituto Superior de Economia e Gestão.

== Political career ==
=== Early beginnings ===
During his time at university, Medina was the President of the Faculty's Students' Union and then the President of the Students' Unions' Federation of Porto.

From 2000 to 2002, Medina served as adviser to Prime Minister António Guterres, first on education and science and later on economic policy.

Following the 2005 national elections, incoming Prime Minister José Sócrates appointed Medina as Secretary of State for Employment and Professional Training, serving under Minister of Labour José António Vieira da Silva.

=== Mayor of Lisbon, 2015–2021 ===
In June 2021, Medina faced calls for his resignation as a result of his government's decision in January 2021 to share the personal information of at least three Lisbon-based Russian dissidents with Russian authorities. In response, he ruled out stepping down and instead apologized for what he initially described as a "bureaucratic error". Afterwards, municipal authorities admitted that since 2011 Lisbon’s city hall had regularly disclosed the personal information of human rights activists, including "names, identification numbers, home addresses and telephone numbers", with several repressive regimes, including Angola, China and Venezuela. Portuguese President Marcelo Rebelo de Sousa described the situation as "deeply regrettable" and declared that everyone deserved to have their fundamental rights respected in a democratic country.

Medina lost his re-election bid in the 2021 local elections, and was succeeded as Mayor by Carlos Moedas.

As of May 2023, CNN discovered that Medina had, as Mayor of Lisbon, offered positions to the rival PSD party. As part of the Tutti Frutti scandal, Medina’s use of influence caused complications to the 2022-2023 Portuguese political crisis, known by numerous cases of corruption during the PS reign.

=== Minister of Finance, 2022–2024 ===
After the Socialist Party's absolute majority victory in the 2022 Portuguese legislative election, he was sworn in as a member of parliament, and two days later, on 30 March 2022, was appointed Minister of Finance of the XXIII Constitutional Government. His first proposal for the government's 2023 budget, which aimed to further slash the deficit to 0.9% of GDP, was approved by parliament in November 2022.

== Other activities ==
European Union organizations

- European Investment Bank (EIB), Ex-Officio Member of the Board of Governors (2022–2024)

International organizations

- Asian Infrastructure Investment Bank (AIIB), Ex-Officio Member of the Board of Governors (2022–2024)
- European Bank for Reconstruction and Development (EBRD), Ex-Officio Member of the Board of Governors (2022–2024)
- Inter-American Development Bank (IAB), Ex-Officio Member of the Board of Governors (2022–2024)
- Multilateral Investment Guarantee Agency (MIGA), World Bank Group, Ex-Officio Member of the Board of Governors (2022–2024)
- World Bank, Ex-Officio Member of the Board of Governors (2022–2024)

== Personal life ==
Medina is married with two sons and a daughter. He plays the piano.

== Electoral history ==
=== Lisbon City Council election, 2017 ===
Ballot: 1 October 2017
Party	Candidate	Votes	%	Seats	+/−
PS	Fernando Medina	106,036	42.0	8	–3
CDS–PP/MPT/PPM	Assunção Cristas	51,984	20.6	4	+3
PSD	Teresa Leal Coelho	28,336	11.2	2	–1
CDU	João Ferreira	24,110	9.6	2	±0
BE	Ricardo Robles	18,025	7.1	1	+1
PAN	Inês Sousa Real	7,658	3.0	0	±0
Other parties		5,833	2.3	0	±0
Blank/Invalid ballots		10,498	4.2	–	–
Turnout		252,481	51.16	17	±0
Source: Autárquicas 2017

=== Lisbon City Council election, 2021 ===
Ballot: 26 September 2021
Party	Candidate	Votes	%	Seats	+/−
PSD/CDS–PP/Alliance/MPT/PPM	Carlos Moedas	83,185	34.3	7	+1
PS/Livre	Fernando Medina	80,907	33.3	7	–1
CDU	João Ferreira	25,550	10.5	2	±0
BE	Beatriz Gomes Dias	15,057	6.2	1	±0
Chega	Nuno Graciano	10,730	4.4	0	new
IL	Bruno Horta Soares	10,213	4.2	0	new
PAN	Manuela Gonzaga	6,625	2.7	0	±0
Other parties		3,031	1.3	0	±0
Blank/Invalid ballots		7,445	3.1	–	–
Turnout		242,743	50.99	17	±0
Source: Autárquicas 2021
