= Isabel Gago =

First female Portuguese chemical engineering teacher (1913–2012)

- Born: Isabel Maria Gago; 30 May 1913; Lisbon, Portugal
- Died: 8 May 2012 (Aged 98); Lisbon, Portugal
- Occupation: Chemical engineer
- Known for: First female graduate and first female teacher in her discipline

Isabel Gago (30 May 1913 – 8 May 2012) was only the second woman to study engineering in Portugal and the first woman to teach chemical engineering.

== Early life ==
Isabel Maria Gago was born in the Portuguese capital of Lisbon on 30 May 1913. As the daughter of an army captain who was killed in Flanders during World War I, Gago was able to attend the Instituto de Odivelas in northern Lisbon, a school reserved for the daughters of army officers, at that time called the Female Institute of Education and Work. She joined the school as a boarder in 1922, at the age of eight. Following five years of primary instruction and two years of secondary school, Gago then transferred to the Maria Amália Vaz de Carvalho Secondary School in Lisbon as she had no certainty of being able to complete high school at Odivelas. In 1933, she joined Lisbon's Instituto Superior Técnico (IST), eventually becoming, in 1939, one of the first two women to graduate in the field of chemical engineering.

== Career ==
After graduation, Gago remained working at IST until her retirement, in 1984, at the age of 70. She became the first female teacher of her subject in Portugal, giving theoretical and practical classes in general chemistry and in the field of electrochemistry and electrometallurgy, although her lack of an advanced degree meant that she was never allowed to call herself a teacher and was always a "First assistant". In her career Gago faced significant problems as neither Portuguese society nor her co-workers accepted women who wished to carry out professional activities, particularly in the exclusive male world of engineering. In the 1940s she constructed a Portable Analysis Laboratory (Laboratório de Análises Portátil) for use in the field, in a wooden suitcase which could double as a work table so that the analyses could be done resting on the operator's knees. In the 1960s, she was part of the academic team that developed the laboratory at the University of Lourenço Marques in Mozambique.

== Awards and honours ==
In 2011, in celebration of the centenary of the Instituto Superior Técnico, she was honoured, along with Maria Amélia Chaves (first woman to graduate in civil engineering, from the same Institute) and Sílvia Brito Costa (first female professor of engineering).

Isabel Gago died on 8 May 2012.
