= Olga Roriz =

Portuguese choreographer and dancer (born 1955)

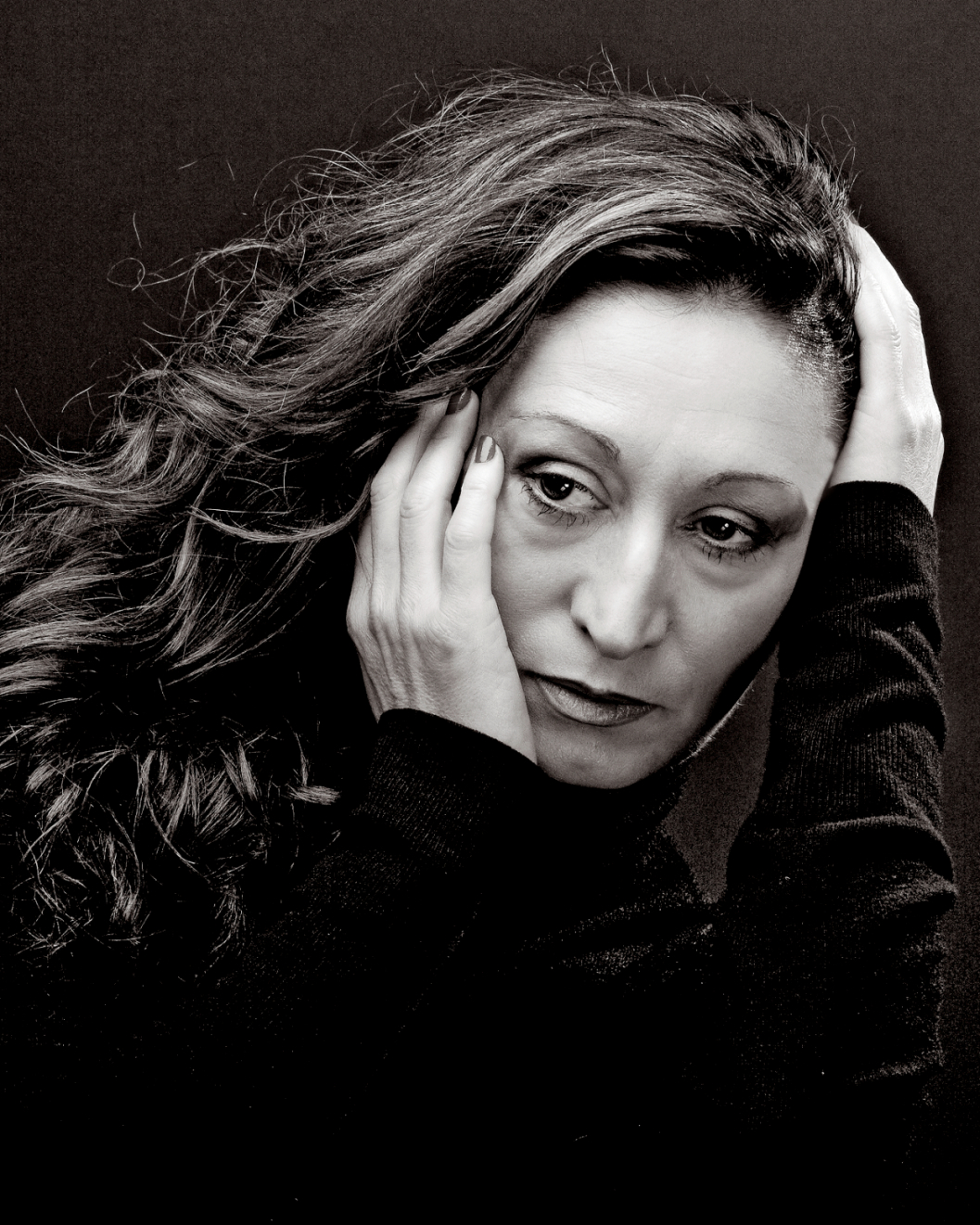
- Born: August 8, 1955 (age 70)
- Occupations: Choreographer and dancer

Olga Roriz (born 8 August 1955, in Viana do Castelo) is a Portuguese choreographer and dancer.

== Awards ==
- 2008: Grande Prémio da Sociedade Portuguesa de Autores
- 2012: Prémio da Latinidade
