= Teresa Leal Coelho =

Portuguese politician

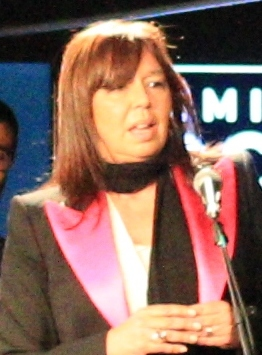

Member of the Assembly of the Republic
- In office 20 June 2011 – 24 October 2019
- Constituency: Porto (2011–2015); Santarém (2015–2019)

Member of the Lisbon City Council
- In office 24 October 2013 – 18 October 2021

Personal details
- Born: Teresa de Andrade Leal Coelho; 29 March 1961 (age 65) Portuguese Mozambique
- Party: Social Democratic Party
- Spouse: Francisco Ribeiro de Menezes
- Children: 1
- Education: Instituto de Odivelas
- Alma mater: University of Lisbon

Teresa de Andrade Leal Coelho (born 29 March 1961) is a Portuguese politician who was a member of the Assembly of the Republic between 2011 and 2019.

== Early life and training ==
Teresa de Andrade Leal Coelho was born in the then Portuguese colony of Mozambique on 29 March 1961. Her family returned to Portugal when she was five but her father, César Leal Coelho, was a navy officer and he, accompanied by his family, was subsequently posted to Guinea-Bissau, where she completed her final year of primary education. Her school friend there was Paula Saraiva de Carvalho, daughter of Otelo Saraiva de Carvalho, a military officer who would be the chief strategist of the 1974 Carnation Revolution in Lisbon that overthrew the authoritarian Estado Novo regime. With her parents still in Guinea-Bissau, Coelho attended the Instituto de Odivelas, a secondary school for the daughters of military officers, in Lisbon. She then studied at the Faculty of Law of the University of Lisbon and at the Free University of Lisbon, from where she obtained a law degree. She has taken courses for a PhD at the Lusíada University, where she has been a lecturer since the late 1980s.

== Work ==
In the early 1980s Coelho worked for the national broadcaster, RTP, among other things being the first woman to work in the sports section. She, herself, was a keen volleyball player, being a member of the S.L. Benfica club and also working for the club. She has also worked at the Belém Cultural Center and on social projects linked to child support. In 1999, Coelho was an international observer for the East Timor referendum. Later, she was a researcher for the Portuguese National Defence Institute.

== Political career ==
In the late 1980s, Coelho met Pedro Passos Coelho (no relation), who would go on to be the leader of the Social Democratic Party (PSD) and the prime minister between 2011 and 2015. Together with others, such as Paulo Teixeira Pinto and Luís Coimbra, they founded, in 2001, the think tank Movimento Pensar Portugal. In 2011, Coelho was elected to the Assembly of the Republic on the PSD list for the Porto constituency. She was re-elected in 2015, this time for the Santarém district. Her period in parliament was not without controversy. Problems arose when she argued for greater transparency about parliamentary deputies who were freemasons and when she disagreed with the party's support for a referendum on adoption by same-sex couples. This led to her resignation as a vice-president of the PSD parliamentary group.

In September 2013, Coelho was also elected as a councillor for the Lisbon City Council. She was re-elected in 2017. Her time in office has also been marked by controversy and in 2019 the PSD's confidence in her was withdrawn for failing to follow the agreed line of the party.

Coelho is married to the diplomat Francisco Pimentel de Mello Ribeiro de Menezes, who has been the Portuguese ambassador to Sweden, Spain, and Germany. They have a son.
