= 2009 Portuguese local elections =

- 11 October 2009

All 308 Portuguese municipalities and 4,260 Portuguese Parishes All 2,078 local government councils
- Opinion polls
- Turnout: 59.0% ▼2.0 pp
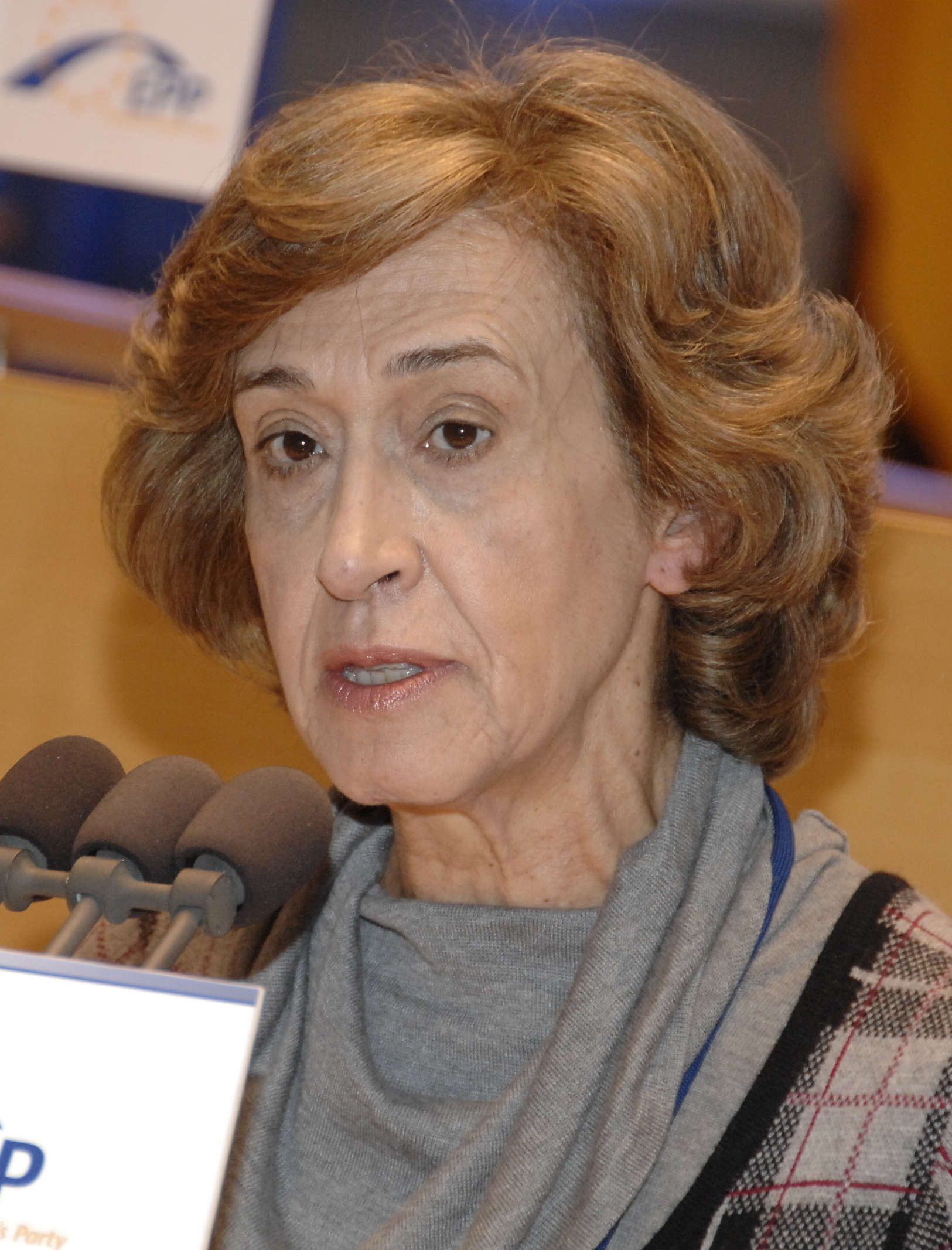

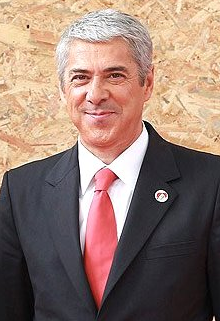

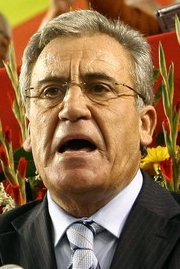
	First party	Second party	Third party
Leader	Manuela Ferreira Leite	José Sócrates	Jerónimo de Sousa
Party	PSD	PS	PCP
Alliance			CDU
Last election	158 mayors, 39.9%	109 mayors, 35.8%	32 mayors, 11.0%
Popular vote	2,142,566	2,084,382	539,694
Percentage	38.7%	37.7%	9.8%
Swing	▼1.2 pp	▲1.9 pp	▼1.2 pp
Mayors	139	132	28
Mayors +/–	▼19	▲23	▼4
Councillors	873	921	174
Councillors +/–	▼34	▲69	▼29

Local elections were held in Portugal on 11 October 2009. The elections consisted of three separate elections in the 308 Portuguese municipalities, the election for the Municipal Chambers, another election for the Municipal Assembly and a last one for the lower-level Parish Assembly, whose winner is elected parish president. This last was held separately in the more than 4,000 parishes around the country. The elections took place just two weeks after the 2009 legislative election.

The elections resulted in a very close outcome between the Socialist Party and the Social Democratic Party, in which the Social Democrats lost almost 20 municipalities and also lost a considerable number of councilors. The Socialists, despite despite being second in the number of mayors elected, were the party with the largest number of elected councilors, a situation that had not occurred since 1989. The Socialists won also a decisive victory in Lisbon where the incumbent mayor, António Costa, defeated the former mayor and Prime Minister Pedro Santana Lopes by a clear margin, 44 to 39 percent.

The Social Democratic Party (PSD) lost some municipalities to the Socialists, but they did held on to municipalities like Porto, Vila Nova de Gaia, Sintra and Coimbra. The People's Party held on to their sole municipality, Ponte de Lima, continuing its decline in local politics, despite running in several coalitions with the PSD.

On the left, the Democratic Unitarian Coalition, led by the Communist Party, obtained their worst result in history, winning less than 10 percent of the vote and losing 4 municipalities including Beja and Évora. The Left Bloc kept the presidency of its single municipality, Salvaterra de Magos.

Just like in 2005, some independent candidates involved in corruption investigations, having been expelled from their parties, were re-elected again, as was the case of Valentim Loureiro in Gondomar and Isaltino Morais in Oeiras. On the other hand, Fátima Felgueiras, independent candidate in Felgueiras, suffered a surprising defeat to her Social Democratic challenger.

Turnout in these election was the lowest in local election, as only 59 percent of the electorate cast a ballot, although the number of ballots cast in the election was the highest ever in local elections.

== Background ==
=== Electoral system ===
All 308 municipalities are allocated a certain number of councilors to elect corresponding to the number of registered voters in a given municipality. Each party or coalition must present a list of candidates. The winner of the most voted list for the municipal council is automatically elected mayor, similar to first-past-the-post (FPTP). The lists are closed and the seats in each municipality are apportioned according to the D'Hondt method. Unlike in national legislative elections, independent lists are allowed to run. Changes to the electoral registration system, approved in 2008, which made registration automatic based on each voter's Identity card, led to a significant increase in the number of registered voters, from 8,8 million in 2005 to 9,4 million in 2009.

=== By-elections (2005–2009) ===
During the normal four-year term of local governments, one municipal council by-election was held in the municipality of Lisbon on 15 July 2007, after the then mayor Carmona Rodrigues (PSD) lost the support of his own party, following corruption investigations, and all PSD councillors resigned, prompting the fall of the local administration. The by-election resulted in a victory for the PS, which thus regained control of the Lisbon City Council with approximately 29% of the vote and 6 councillors, while the PSD fell to third place with only 16% of the vote. The ousted mayor, Carmona Rodrigues, came in second place with almost 17%, leading an independent list. Adding to this, twenty-five parishes also held a by-election for parish assemblies.

City control in by-elections (2005–2009)
Date	Municipality	Population	Previous control	New control
15 July 2007	Lisbon	564,657	Social Democratic Party (PSD)	Socialist Party (PS)

== Parties ==
Official logo of the election.

The main political forces involved in the election were:

- Left Bloc (BE)
- CDS – People's Party (CDS–PP) (only in some municipalities)^{1}
- Unitary Democratic Coalition (CDU)
- Socialist Party (PS)
- Social Democratic Party (PSD) (only in some municipalities)^{1}

^{1} The PSD and the CDS–PP also formed coalitions in several municipalities with the Earth Party (MPT) and the People's Monarchist Party (PPM).

== Opinion polling ==
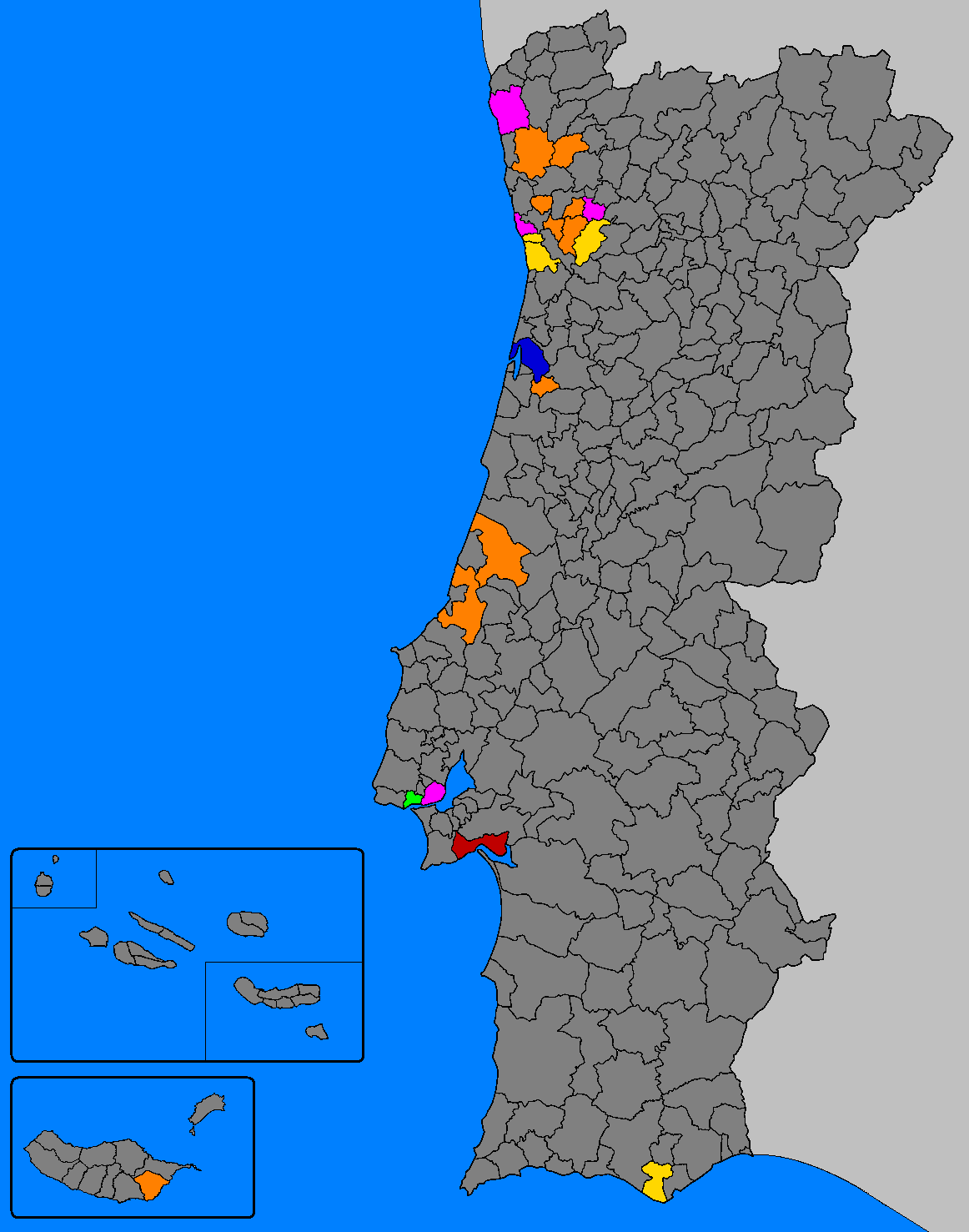
Most voted party or coalition per Municipality according to opinion polls. ■ - PSD ■ - PS ■ - PSD/CDS–PP ■ - CDS–PP ■ - Independents ■ - CDU ■ - No polls

== Voter turnout ==
The table below shows voter turnout throughout election day.

Turnout	Time								
Turnout	12:00			16:00			19:00		
Turnout	2005	2009	±	2005	2009	±	2005	2009	±
Total	21.35%	21.23%	▼0.12 pp	48.00%	45.30%	▼2.70 pp	60.94%	59.03%	▼1.91 pp

== Results ==
=== Municipal Councils ===
==== National summary of votes and seats ====
Summary of the 11 October 2009 Municipal Councils elections results
Parties	Votes	%	±pp swing	Candidacies	Councillors		Mayors	
Parties	Votes	%	±pp swing	Candidacies	Total	±	Total	±
Socialist	2,084,382	37.67	▲1.8	307	921	▲29	132	▲23
Social Democratic	1,270,137	22.95	▼5.3	237	666	▼76	117	▼21
Democratic Unity Coalition	539,694	9.75	▼1.2	300	174	▼29	28	▼4
Social Democratic / People's	537,247	9.71	▲0.5	55	157	▲21	19	▲1
Independents	225,379	4.07	▲1.7	49	67	▲31	7	0
People's	171,049	3.09	▲0.0	159	31	▲1	1	0
Left Bloc	167,101	3.02	▲0.0	133	9	▲2	1	0
PSD / CDS–PP / MPT / PPM	164,051	2.96	—	6	22	—	1	—
PSD / CDS–PP / PPM	99,838	1.80	▲0.1	5	17	▲2	1	0
PSD / CDS–PP / PPM / MPT	69,584	1.26	▼0.1	2	9	▼2	1	0
Portuguese Workers' Communist	14,275	0.26	▼0.0	17	0	0	0	0
Earth	11,069	0.20	▲0.2	21	2	▲2	0	0
New Democracy	6,946	0.13	▲0.1	4	1	▲0.1	0	0
Hope for Portugal Movement	1,975	0.04	—	1	0	—	0	—
PSD / CDS–PP / MPT	1,709	0.03	0.0	1	2	0	0	0
Merit and Society Movement	1,569	0.03	—	5	0	—	0	—
People's Monarchist	1,461	0.03	0.0	6	0	0	0	0
National Renovator	1,202	0.02	▼0.0	2	0	0	0	0
Labour	732	0.01	—	3	0	—	0	—
People's / Earth	165	0.00	—	1	0	—	0	—
People's / People's Monarchist	156	0.00	—	2	0	—	0	—
**Total valid**	**5,369,721**	**97.03**	**▲1.3**	—	**2,078**	**▲32**	**308**	**0**
Blank ballots	94,983	1.72	▼0.9					
Invalid ballots	69,120	1.25	▼0.5					
**Total**	**5,533,824**	**100.00**						
Registered voters/turnout	9,377,343	59.01	▼2.0					

==== Municipality map ====
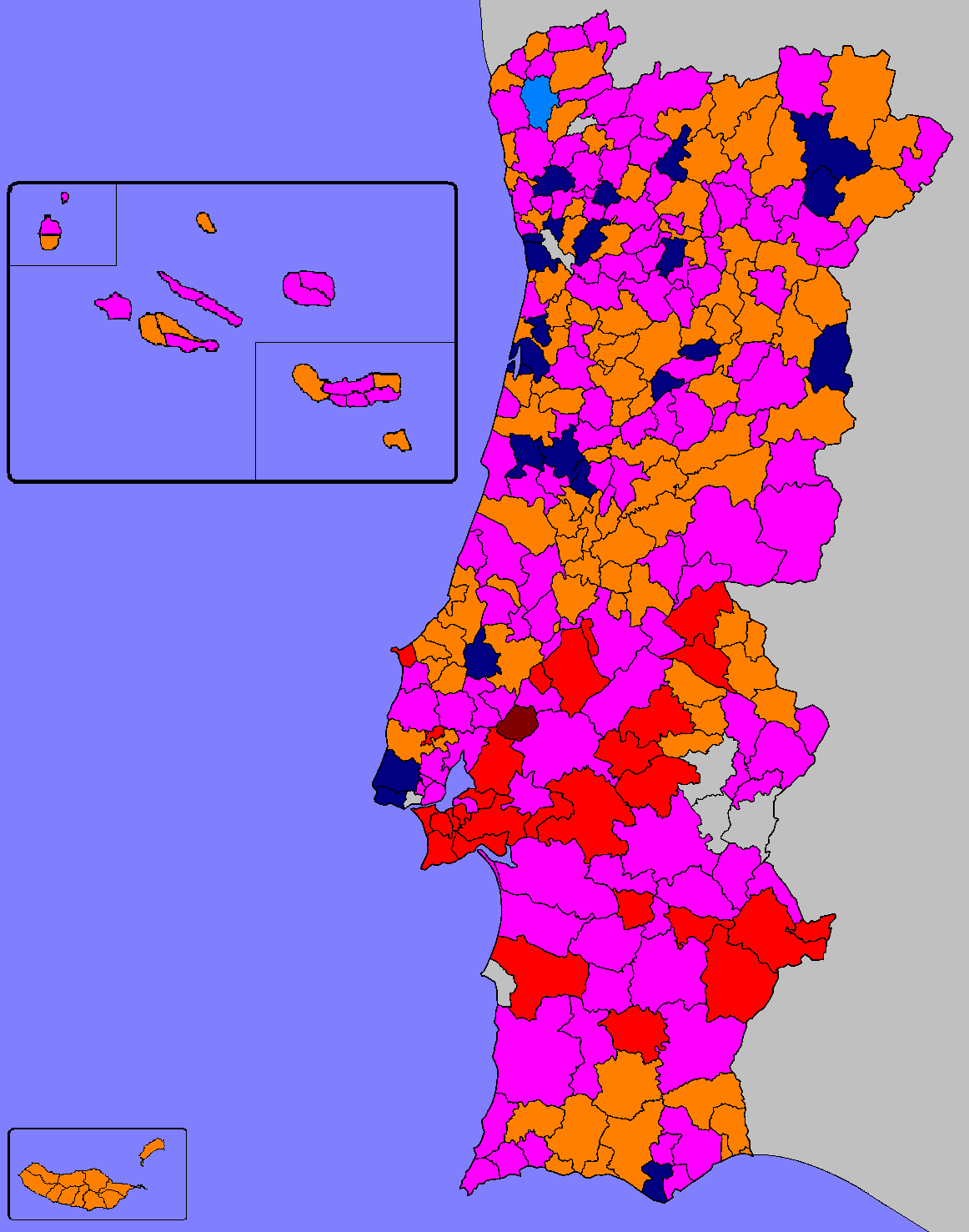
Most voted parties or coalitions in each Municipality. Municipalities won by: ■ - PSD: 117 ■ - PS: 132 ■ - CDU: 28 ■ - BE: 1 ■ - CDS–PP: 1 ■ - PSD coalitions: 22 ■ - Independents: 7

==== City control ====
The following table lists party control in all district capitals, highlighted in bold, as well as in municipalities above 100,000 inhabitants. Population estimates from the 2001 Census.

Municipality	Population	Previous control	New control
Almada	160,825	Unitary Democratic Coalition (CDU)	Unitary Democratic Coalition (CDU)
Amadora	175,872	Socialist Party (PS)	Socialist Party (PS)
**Aveiro**	73,335	PSD / CDS–PP	PSD / CDS–PP
Barcelos	122,096	Social Democratic Party (PSD)	Socialist Party (PS)
**Beja**	35,762	Unitary Democratic Coalition (CDU)	Socialist Party (PS)
**Braga**	169,192	Socialist Party (PS)	Socialist Party (PS)
**Bragança**	34,750	Social Democratic Party (PSD)	Social Democratic Party (PSD)
Cascais	170,683	PSD / CDS–PP	PSD / CDS–PP
**Castelo Branco**	55,708	Socialist Party (PS)	Socialist Party (PS)
**Coimbra**	148,443	PSD / CDS–PP / PPM	PSD / CDS–PP / PPM
**Évora**	56,519	Socialist Party (PS)	Socialist Party (PS)
**Faro**	58,051	Socialist Party (PS)	PSD / CDS–PP / PPM / MPT
**Funchal**	103,961	Social Democratic Party (PSD)	Social Democratic Party (PSD)
Gondomar	159,096	Independent (IND)	Independent (IND)
**Guarda**	43,822	Socialist Party (PS)	Socialist Party (PS)
Guimarães	159,576	Socialist Party (PS)	Socialist Party (PS)
**Leiria**	119,847	Social Democratic Party (PSD)	Socialist Party (PS)
**Lisbon** (Note: In 2005, the PSD was reelected but there was a by-election in 2007 that was won by the PS and, thus, the PS controlled Lisbon city at the time of the 2009 elections.) (details)	564,657	Socialist Party (PS)	Socialist Party (PS)
Loures	199,059	Socialist Party (PS)	Socialist Party (PS)
Maia	120,111	PSD / CDS–PP	PSD / CDS–PP
Matosinhos	167,026	Socialist Party (PS)	Socialist Party (PS)
Odivelas	133,847	Socialist Party (PS)	Socialist Party (PS)
Oeiras	162,128	Independent (IND)	Independent (IND)
**Ponta Delgada**	65,854	Social Democratic Party (PSD)	Social Democratic Party (PSD)
**Portalegre**	25,980	Social Democratic Party (PSD)	Social Democratic Party (PSD)
**Porto** (details)	263,131	PSD / CDS–PP	PSD / CDS–PP
**Santarém**	63,563	Social Democratic Party (PSD)	Social Democratic Party (PSD)
Santa Maria da Feira	135,964	Social Democratic Party (PSD)	Social Democratic Party (PSD)
Seixal	150,271	Unitary Democratic Coalition (CDU)	Unitary Democratic Coalition (CDU)
**Setúbal**	113,934	Unitary Democratic Coalition (CDU)	Unitary Democratic Coalition (CDU)
Sintra	363,749	PSD / CDS–PP / PPM / MPT	PSD / CDS–PP / PPM / MPT
**Viana do Castelo**	88,631	Socialist Party (PS)	Socialist Party (PS)
Vila Franca de Xira	122,908	Socialist Party (PS)	Socialist Party (PS)
Vila Nova de Famalicão	127,567	PSD / CDS–PP	PSD / CDS–PP
Vila Nova de Gaia	288,749	PSD / CDS–PP	PSD / CDS–PP
**Vila Real**	49,957	Social Democratic Party (PSD)	Social Democratic Party (PSD)
**Viseu**	93,501	Social Democratic Party (PSD)	Social Democratic Party (PSD)

=== Municipal Assemblies ===
==== National summary of votes and seats ====
Summary of the 11 October 2009 Municipal Assemblies elections results
Parties	Votes	%	±pp swing	Candidacies	Mandates	
Parties	Votes	%	±pp swing	Candidacies	Total	±
Socialist	2,028,681	36.67	▲1.0	306	2,855	▲61
Social Democratic	1,226,283	22.16	▼4.8	235	2,124	▼292
Democratic Unity Coalition	588,011	10.63	▼1.1	301	651	▼71
Social Democratic / People's	515,145	9.31	▲0.9	54	522	▲115
Left Bloc	231,089	4.18	▲0.2	141	139	▲25
Independents	204,491	3.70	▲1.6	46	224	▲103
People's	195,635	3.54	▲0.2	142	253	▲63
PSD / CDS–PP / MPT / PPM	162,016	2.93	—	6	65	—
PSD / CDS–PP / PPM	98,414	1.78	▲0.1	5	60	▼13
PSD / CDS–PP / PPM / MPT	63,554	1.15	▼0.1	2	22	▼5
Earth	11,144	0.20	▲0.2	18	14	▲14
Portuguese Workers' Communist	7,421	0.13	▼0.1	9	0	▼1
New Democracy	7,341	0.13	▲0.1	3	5	▲4
Hope for Portugal Movement	4,898	0.09	—	3	0	—
Merit and Society Movement	1,755	0.03	—	3	0	—
National Renovator	1,739	0.03	—	2	0	—
PSD / CDS–PP / MPT	1,627	0.03	0.0	1	6	0
People's Monarchist	1,338	0.02	0.0	3	5	0
Labour	826	0.01	—	2	0	—
People's / Earth	252	0.00	—	1	0	—
People's / People's Monarchist	205	0.00	—	1	1	—
**Total valid**	**5,351,865**	**96.72**	**▲1.3**	—	**6,946**	**▲60**
Blank ballots	110,169	1.99	▼0.9			
Invalid ballots	70,805	1.28	▼0.4			
**Total**	**5,532,839**	**100.00**				
Registered voters/turnout	9,377,343	59.00	▼2.0			

=== Parish Assemblies ===
==== National summary of votes and seats ====
Summary of the 11 October 2009 Parish Assemblies elections results
Parties	Votes	%	±pp swing	Candidacies	Mandates		Presidents	
Parties	Votes	%	±pp swing	Candidacies	Total	±	Total	±
Socialist	2,002,955	36.27	▲0.8	3,573	13,736	▲253	1,577	▲59
Social Democratic	1,237,322	22.41	▼4.2	2,694	11,113	▼1,338	1,530	▼193
Democratic Unity Coalition	606,004	10.97	▼1.1	2,269	2,266	▼289	213	▼31
Social Democratic / People's	508,264	9.20	▲1.6	744	2,911	▲847	312	▲93
Independents	337,613	6.12	▲1.6	735	2,673	▲473	332	▲40
Left Bloc	163,252	2.96	▲0.3	645	235	▲6	4	▲1
PSD / CDS–PP / MPT / PPM	161,368	2.92	—	91	384	—	31	—
People's	128,947	2.33	▼0.4	712	693	▼129	53	▼12
PSD / CDS–PP / PPM	96,927	1.76	▲0.2	109	405	0	36	▲2
PSD / CDS–PP / PPM / MPT	62,206	1.13	▼0.7	36	168	▼48	15	▼4
Earth	8,400	0.15	▲0.1	56	47	▲24	2	▼1
Portuguese Workers' Communist	3,329	0.06	▼0.0	24	0	0	0	0
Merit and Society Movement	1,801	0.03	—	10	0	—	0	—
New Democracy	1,693	0.03	▼0.1	8	3	▼3	0	0
PSD / CDS–PP / MPT	1,532	0.03	0.0	11	29	▼3	2	0
People's Monarchist	716	0.01	▲0.1	10	3	▲3	0	0
People's / Earth	542	0.01	—	4	3	—	0	—
Labour	346	0.01	—	5	0	—	0	—
National Renovator	276	0.00	0.0	4	0	0	0	0
People's / People's Monarchist	152	0.00	—	1	3	—	0	—
**Total valid**	**5,323,645**	**96.41**	**▲1.1**	—	**34,672**	—	**4,107**	—
Blank ballots	116,240	2.10	▼0.7					
Invalid ballots	82,475	1.49	▼0.4					
**Total**	**5,522,360**	**100.00**						
Registered voters/turnout	9,360,830	58.99	▼1.9					

== See also ==
- Politics of Portugal
- List of political parties in Portugal
- Elections in Portugal
