= Pedro Santana Lopes =

Portuguese lawyer and politician (born 1956)

Pedro Santana Lopes GCC
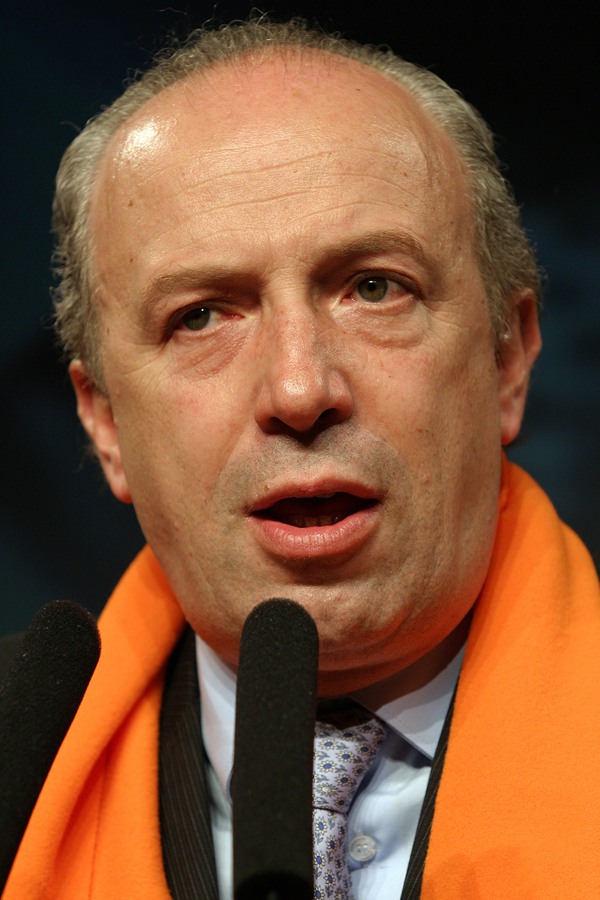
- Santana Lopes in 2005

Mayor of Figueira da Foz
- Incumbent
- Assumed office 17 October 2021
- Preceded by: Carlos Monteiro
- In office 14 December 1997 – 16 December 2001
- Preceded by: Aguiar de Carvalho
- Succeeded by: António Duarte Silva

Prime Minister of Portugal
- In office 17 July 2004 – 12 March 2005
- President: Jorge Sampaio
- Preceded by: José Manuel Barroso
- Succeeded by: José Sócrates

President of the Social Democratic Party
- In office 30 June 2004 – 10 April 2005
- Secretary-General: Miguel Relvas
- Preceded by: José Manuel Barroso
- Succeeded by: Luís Marques Mendes

Leader of the Opposition
- In office 12 March 2005 – 10 April 2005
- Prime Minister: José Sócrates
- Preceded by: José Sócrates
- Succeeded by: Luís Marques Mendes
Other offices
Mayor of Lisbon
In office 14 March 2005 – 28 October 2005
Preceded by	Carmona Rodrigues
Succeeded by	Carmona Rodrigues
In office 23 January 2002 – 17 July 2004
Preceded by	João Soares
Succeeded by	Carmona Rodrigues
Secretary of State for Culture
In office 9 January 1990 – 30 December 1994
Prime Minister	Aníbal Cavaco Silva
Preceded by	Teresa Gouveia
Succeeded by	Manuel Frexes
Secretary of State for the Presidency of the Council of Ministers
In office 6 November 1985 – 17 August 1987
Prime Minister	Aníbal Cavaco Silva
Preceded by	Alfredo Barroso
Succeeded by	Luís Marques Mendes
Chair of Santa Casa da Misericórdia de Lisboa
In office 14 September 2011 – 20 October 2017
Preceded by	Rui Cunha
Succeeded by	Edmundo Martinho
President of Sporting CP
In office 2 June 1995 – 11 April 1996
Preceded by	Sousa Cintra
Succeeded by	José Roquette
Member of the Assembly of the Republic
In office 29 October 2005 – 14 October 2009
Constituency	Lisbon
In office 17 December 2001 – 22 January 2002
Constituency	Lisbon
In office 5 October 1980 – 30 September 1995
Constituency	Lisbon
Member of the European Parliament
In office 14 September 1987 – 24 July 1989
Constituency	Portugal

Personal details
- Born: 29 June 1956 (age 70) Lisbon, Portugal
- Party: Social Democratic (1976–2018, 2026–present)
- Other political affiliations: Alliance (2018–2021); Independent (2021–2026)
- Spouse(s): Maria Isabel Marques Dias (m. 1979, divorced) Maria Teresa de Arriaga (m. 1983, divorced)
- Children: 5
- Relatives: Kaúlza de Arriaga (former father-in-law); Manuela Ferreira Leite (cousin)
- Education: University of Lisbon

Pedro Miguel de Santana Lopes GCC (Portuguese pronunciation: [ˈpeðɾu sɐ̃ˈtɐnɐ ˈlɔpɨʃ]; born 29 June 1956) is a Portuguese lawyer and politician, who is the current mayor of Figueira da Foz. He most notably served as prime minister of Portugal from 2004 to 2005.

== Background and early life ==
Pedro Santana Lopes was born in Campo Grande, Lisbon, to Aníbal Luís Lopes (b. Lisbon, São Sebastião da Pedreira, 17 February 1933), a company administrator whose maternal grandfather's maternal grandfather was a relative of João Brandão, and wife (m. Lisbon, São Sebastião da Pedreira, 27 February 1954) Maria Ivone Risques Pereira de Santana (Lisbon, São Sebastião da Pedreira, 3 May 1931 – Lisbon, 23 March 1999), a half-great-great-great-niece of the 2nd Baron of Brissos.

He graduated as a Licentiate in law from the Faculty of Law of the University of Lisbon, where he was the leader of the Student Union, becoming a lawyer.

== Political career ==
He joined the Social Democratic Party (PSD) in 1976. There he started his career as a deputy to the Assembly of the Republic.

In 1979, he became a legal advisor to Prime Minister Francisco Sá Carneiro, and has identified himself as a follower of his for all his political life.

In 1986, he became the assistant state secretary to Prime Minister Aníbal Cavaco Silva, an office he left the next year to lead to PSD list to the European Parliament, where he remained for two years of his five-year-term.

In 1990, Cavaco Silva appointed him to the government post of Secretary of State for Culture. He left the office in 1994, in disagreement with Cavaco, and returned to law practice. In the 1997 local elections, he ran successfully to become mayor of Figueira da Foz. He decided not to seek a second term there, and instead ran for mayor of Lisbon in the 2001 local elections, defeating the incumbent João Soares and becoming one of the biggest surprises of the electoral night.

== Prime minister ==
When José Manuel Durão Barroso resigned in July 2004 to take up the presidency of the European Commission, Santana Lopes became the president of PSD. At the time, his party had a coalition government with the CDS - People's Party, which held a parliamentary majority, and therefore he was nominated prime minister of the XVI Constitutional Government. His term as mayor of Lisbon was automatically suspended, with his deputy Carmona Rodrigues taking over his duties.

The leadership of Santana Lopes was marked by a number of inherited economic and political problems. When his party took power, after the 2002 legislative elections, the country's economy was in a poor state, with a rising government-spending deficit, partially because of policies focused on public expenditure by the previous governments (led by António Guterres of the Socialist Party) and the early 2000s recession. According to the Economist Intelligence Unit, "Portugal became the first country to breach the EU's 'excessive deficit' rule with a budget deficit of 4.4% of GDP in 2001, well above the 3% of GDP ceiling set by the EU's Stability and Growth Pact." The situation inherited by Santana Lopes was a little better, as the previous government led by Barroso had been able to comply with European Union directives regarding the deficit by selling state assets.

Santana Lopes himself failed to gain a reputation as a competent prime minister. His unusual rise to power, as Barroso's successor rather than by election, contributed to these difficulties, despite his nomination being entirely constitutional.

The short career of Santana Lopes as prime minister began with some members of government being shuffled between departments on the same afternoon as the government was being inaugurated. His minister of Defence Paulo Portas looked surprised during the ceremony when he was announced as the Minister for National Defence and Sea Affairs. Portas' look of surprise when the name of his office was announced was broadcast live on television.

Santana Lopes' period in office was also marked by chaos in the allocation of teachers to schools (more than a month after classes officially started, and resulting from alleged incompetence of the IT provider (designated during the previous Government); the problem was swiftly solved by another small provider), and by claims of pressure exerted on the press, including arranging for the replacement of the information director of the public television channel RTP, and pressing private television channel TVI to tone down the criticism of him by a political commentator, Marcelo Rebelo de Sousa, a former leader of his own party, who consequently left the channel.

Santana Lopes' demise as head of government was sealed on 30 November 2004 when President Jorge Sampaio, a member of the opposing party, announced that he was calling an early Parliament election for February 2005, from which a new government would be formed, after Henrique Chaves, a Santana loyalist, resigned after four days as Minister for Sport, claiming that he lacked "loyalty and truth".

Santana Lopes formally tendered his resignation on 11 December, and his government assumed just a caretaker role until the election. He went on to be defeated in the 2005 legislative elections which was won by the Socialist Party led by José Sócrates. Santana resigned as party leader two days later, although he still briefly assumed the informal position of leader of the opposition, until the election of Luís Marques Mendes as new party leader.

== Subsequent career and activities ==
Despite his defeat in the 2005 legislative elections, Santana Lopes retained his seat at the Assembly of the Republic. He would also resume his functions as mayor of Lisbon, which had been suspended since he took office as prime minister. However, he decided not to seek another term on the 2005 local elections, being succeeded by his deputy, Carmona Rodrigues, who had also replaced him during his premiership. In October 2007, after the election of Luís Filipe Menezes as leader of the Social Democratic Party, he was invited to lead the PSD Parliamentary Group, a position he held until Menezes' resignation in June 2008.

On the 2009 local elections, Santana Lopes ran again for mayor of Lisbon, supported by his party and by the CDS - People's Party, the Earth Party and the People's Monarchist Party. This coalition was, however, unable to prevent the Socialist Party, led by António Costa, to achieve a big victory. Santana Lopes assumed the position of leader of the opposition in the municipality.

In September 2011, Santana Lopes was nominated by Prime Minister Pedro Passos Coelho to assume leadership of Santa Casa da Misericórdia de Lisboa, a charity that runs Portugal's national lottery. In March 2016, the new prime minister, António Costa, nominated Santana Lopes for a new term.

In October 2017, Santana Lopes announced the intention to run again for the leadership of the Social Democratic Party. He resigned leadership of Santa Casa da Misericórdia de Lisboa in order to do so, but was defeated by Rui Rio. After the party election, both Rio and Santana tried to cooperate on several levels, an effort which was not successful from Santana's point of view. He grew increasingly disgruntled with the course of action imposed by Rui Rio, and in June 2018 announced he would be ending his 42 years of party membership and would seek to create a new political party.

== Alliance (2018–2021) ==
On 18 August 2018, it was revealed the new party headed and co-founded by Santana Lopes was to be called Alliance (Portuguese: Aliança). The party submitted the legally required paperwork to the Constitutional Court and was officially registered on 23 October.

Immediately after the official registration, the party started working on the campaign for the 2019 European Parliament election. Santana Lopes had already said, even before the party was registered, that he would not be running in the election, and that its top candidate would be announced in the near future. On 2 December 2018, the party formally announced Paulo de Almeida Sande, a professor of European affairs and advisor of the president Marcelo Rebelo de Sousa, as its top candidate. While being generally considered to have a profound knowledge of European issues, Paulo Sande lacked recognition next to the general public, and relied heavily on Santana's personal popularity to engage with supporters and potential voters. In March 2019, Santana Lopes said that the party's objective would be to elect at least one MEP, with three being a good result. Paulo Sande fared well in the televised debates, but the party suffered a heavy blow to its campaign on 15 May 2019, when Santana and Sande were involved in a car crash on the A1 motorway. They were heading to a campaign rally in Cascais after an event in Coimbra when, between Soure and Pombal, Santana fell asleep and lost control of the vehicle, a Lexus GS rented in name of his law firm. The car slid slowly to the left, hitting the central reservation barrier and veering abruptly to the right, crashing out of the road and tumbling several times before coming to a standstill in an overturned position. No other vehicles were involved in the accident, but other drivers witnessed it and alerted the emergency services. Paulo Sande was able to get out of the wrecked car by his own means; he tried to help Santana but was unable to release him. Santana Lopes would only be removed from the wreckage by the emergency services, and was transported by helicopter to Coimbra hospital, to where Sande was also taken on an ambulance. The accident was reported by several media outlets, which prompted Alliance to immediately suspend its campaign. Paulo Sande suffered only minor injuries and was discharged from the hospital a few hours later, while Santana spent the night in observation, being discharged on the next day after several exams revealed no significant lesions; he was, however, told by doctors to rest for some days in order to ensure a full recovery. This meant that, with little more than a week to the election day, Paulo Sande was largely left to campaign alone, although Santana appeared on a video three days before the election to urge people to vote. The party obtained 1,86% of the vote and elected no MEPs.

Next on the schedule were the 2019 legislative elections. The party made a campaign of clear opposition to the incumbent government led by António Costa. Santana Lopes said that Alliance hoped to elect two to three MPs in Lisbon district, and eventually some more in Porto and Braga districts; he also stressed that his party would never support a government of the Socialist Party even in the event of a hung parliament. Santana's predictions for the election were based at the party's results in the European elections. During a campaign event in Lisbon, he told that Alliance obtained 3% in the district at the European elections, and that the same result would allow the party to elect two MPs in the legislative vote. This line of thought proved to be flawed as the party performed considerably worse, obtaining only 0,77% of the vote on national level and electing no MPs. Even in Lisbon district, where it is easier for a small party to elect an MP, the party scored 1,27% of the vote, considerably lower than the 3% anticipated by Santana. On the election night, he admitted for the first time that he could relinquish party leadership.

Without further national elections in the near future, and with all the objectives unachieved, Santana Lopes suspended his executive functions as Alliance's leader on 15 May 2020, and announced a period of reorganisation of the party. On 28 August 2020, it was announced that he would not seek re-election as party leader at the next congress, where he was succeeded by Paulo Bento. On 25 January 2021, Alliance announced that Santana Lopes had sent a request for his party membership to be terminated. He considered that Alliance could only have a future without him, citing the fact that many people still link him to the Social Democratic Party as the main reason.

== Return to Figueira da Foz ==
After Santana's announcement that he was leaving Alliance leadership, rumours started circulating that he could be preparing a return to the Social Democratic Party. In October 2020, at least one media outlet reported that its leader, Rui Rio, wanted Santana Lopes to be the party candidate for mayor of Sintra; in March 2021, it was reported that he had declined to be the party candidate for mayor of Torres Vedras. His return to the Social Democratic Party was ruled out when it became known, in late March 2021, that he was seeking to create a citizen's group in order to run for mayor of Figueira da Foz, a position he held between 1998 and 2001. His candidacy, leading a list called Figueira The First (Portuguese: Figueira a Primeira), was confirmed in May and generated significant interest, with opinion polls giving him real chances of winning. The candidate of the Social Democratic Party, Pedro Machado, launched on 10 August a legal action to invalidate Santana's candidacy due to alleged irregularities in its submission, which was rejected by the local court three days later.

Figueira a Primeira would effectively become the winner, obtaining 40,39% and four councillors, against 38,39% for the Socialist Party, also with four councillors. The Social Democratic Party scored 10,83%, electing only one councillor. Under Portuguese law, the top candidate of the most voted list automatically becomes the mayor, but Santana will have to negotiate with other political groups in order to implement his agenda, since he didn't won a majority. He nevertheless considered the result "an extraordinary accomplishment".

Santana Lopes took office as mayor of Figueira da Foz on 17 October 2021. On his inauguration speech, he announced to have reached a deal with the University of Coimbra to build a campus on Figueira da Foz, dedicated to marine economy and sciences. The campus opened on 20 December 2022.

On 20 April 2023, and without explicitly assuming a candidacy, Santana Lopes entertained the possibility of being a candidate for President of Portugal on the next election, saying that he saw no one better qualified than himself. However, he placed himself definitely out of the race on 19 October 2023, few days after the outbreak of the Gaza war, citing the current state of world affairs as the main reason.

On 21 January 2024, Pedro Santana Lopes attended a convention of the Democratic Alliance, a coalition led by the Social Democratic Party in order to contest the 2024 legislative election. He made a speech praising Luís Montenegro, who reportedly felt moved while listening it.

After much speculation, in June 2026, at the PSD's congress, Santana Lopes officially returned to the party, citing that he wouldn't apologize for leaving the party.

== Outside politics ==
After resigning as Secretary of State for Culture, Santana Lopes successfully ran for president of Sporting CP. Despite being in office for less than a year, the club won the 1994–1995 Taça de Portugal in football under his leadership.

== Electoral history ==
=== European Parliament election, 1987 ===
Ballot: 19 July 1987
Party	Candidate	Votes	%	Seats
PSD	Pedro Santana Lopes	2,111,828	37.5	10
PS	Maria de Lourdes Pintasilgo	1,267,672	22.5	6
CDS	Lucas Pires	868,718	15.4	4
CDU	Ângelo Veloso	648,700	11.5	3
PRD	Medeiros Ferreira	250,158	4.4	1
PPM	Miguel Esteves Cardoso	155,990	2.8	0
Other parties		193,869	3.4	0
Blank/Invalid ballots		142,715	2.5	–
Turnout		5,639,650	72.42	24
Source: Comissão Nacional de Eleições

=== PSD leadership election, 1995 ===
Ballot: 19 February 1995
Candidate	Votes	%
Fernando Nogueira	532	51.6
José Manuel Durão Barroso	499	48.4
Pedro Santana Lopes	withdrew	
Turnout	1,031	
Source: Resultados

=== Figueira da Foz City Council election, 1997 ===
Ballot: 14 December 1997
Party	Candidate	Votes	%	Seats	+/−
PSD	Pedro Santana Lopes	22,133	59.9	6	+2
PS	Carlos Beja	11,227	30.5	3	–2
CDU	–	1,580	4.3	0	±0
CDS–PP	–	523	1.4	0	±0
PCTP/MRPP	–	204	0.6	0	±0
Blank/Invalid ballots		1,248	3.4	–	–
Turnout		36,965	65.45	9	±0
Source: Autárquicas 1997

=== PSD leadership election, 2000 ===
Ballot: 27 February 2000
Candidate	Votes	%
José Manuel Durão Barroso	469	50.3
Pedro Santana Lopes	313	33.6
Luís Marques Mendes	150	16.1
Turnout	932	
Source: Congresso PSD

=== Lisbon City Council election, 2001 ===
Ballot: 16 December 2001
Party	Candidate	Votes	%	Seats	+/−
PSD/PPM	Pedro Santana Lopes	131,094	42.1	8	+1
PS/CDU	João Soares	129,368	41.5	8	–2
CDS–PP	Paulo Portas	23,637	7.6	1	±0
BE	Miguel Portas	11,899	3.8	0	new
Other parties		5,766	1.9	0	±0
Blank/Invalid ballots		9,718	3.1	–	–
Turnout		311,482	54.83	17	±0
Source: Autárquicas 2001

=== PSD leadership election, 2004 ===
Ballot: 1 July 2004
Candidate	Votes	%
Pedro Santana Lopes	98	97.0
Against	3	3.0
Turnout	101	
Source: Resultados

=== Legislative election, 2005 ===
Ballot: 20 February 2005
Party	Candidate	Votes	%	Seats	+/−
PS	José Sócrates	2,588,312	45.0	121	+25
PSD	Pedro Santana Lopes	1,653,425	28.8	75	–30
CDU	Jerónimo de Sousa	433,369	7.5	14	+2
CDS–PP	Paulo Portas	416,415	7.3	12	–2
BE	Francisco Louçã	364,971	6.4	8	+5
Other parties		122,127	2.1	0	±0
Blank/Invalid ballots		169,052	2.9	–	–
Turnout		5,747,834	64.26	230	±0
Source: Comissão Nacional de Eleições

=== PSD leadership election, 2008 ===
Ballot: 31 May 2008
Candidate	Votes	%
Manuela Ferreira Leite	17,278	37.9
Pedro Passos Coelho	14,160	31.1
Pedro Santana Lopes	13,495	29.6
Patinha Antão	308	0.7
Blank/Invalid ballots	351	0.8
Turnout	45,592	59.13
Source: Resultados

=== Lisbon City Council election, 2009 ===
Ballot: 11 October 2009
Party	Candidate	Votes	%	Seats	+/−
PS	António Costa	123,372	44.0	9	+3
PSD/CDS–PP/MPT/PPM	Pedro Santana Lopes	108,457	38.7	7	+4
CDU	Ruben de Carvalho	22,623	8.1	1	–1
BE	Luís Fazenda	12,795	4.6	0	–1
Other parties		5,911	2.1	0	±0
Blank/Invalid ballots		7,152	2.5	–	–
Turnout		280,310	53.43	17	±0
Source: Autárquicas 2009

=== PSD leadership election, 2018 ===
Ballot: 13 January 2018
Candidate	Votes	%
Rui Rio	22,728	54.2
Pedro Santana Lopes	19,244	45.8
Blank/Invalid ballots	683	–
Turnout	42,655	60.34
Source: Resultados

=== Legislative election, 2019 ===
Ballot: 6 October 2019
Party	Candidate	Votes	%	Seats	+/−
PS	António Costa	1,903,687	36.3	108	+22
PSD	Rui Rio	1,454,283	27.8	79	–10
BE	Catarina Martins	498,549	9.5	19	±0
CDU	Jerónimo de Sousa	332,018	6.3	12	–5
CDS–PP	Assunção Cristas	221,094	4.2	5	–13
PAN	André Silva	173,931	3.3	4	+3
Chega	André Ventura	67,502	1.3	1	new
IL	Carlos Guimarães Pinto	67,443	1.3	1	new
Livre	Collective leadership	56,940	1.1	1	+1
Alliance	Pedro Santana Lopes	40,175	0.8	0	new
Other parties		166,987	3.2	0	±0
Blank/Invalid ballots		254,875	4.9	–	–
Turnout		5,237,484	48.60	230	±0
Source: Comissão Nacional de Eleições

=== Figueira da Foz City Council election, 2021 ===
Ballot: 26 September 2021
Party	Candidate	Votes	%	Seats	+/−
Ind.	Pedro Santana Lopes	12,528	40.4	4	new
PS	Carlos Monteiro	11,909	38.4	4	–2
PSD	Pedro Machado	3,358	10.8	1	–2
CDU	Bernardo dos Reis	831	2.7	0	±0
BE	Rui Miguel da Silva	637	2.1	0	±0
CDS–PP	Miguel Chaves	361	1.2	0	±0
Blank/Invalid ballots		1,395	4.5	–	–
Turnout		31,019	56.48	9	±0
Source: Autárquicas 2021

=== Figueira da Foz City Council election, 2025 ===
Ballot: 12 October 2025
Party	Candidate	Votes	%	Seats	+/−
PSD/CDS–PP	Pedro Santana Lopes	18,332	58.9	6	+5
PS	João Paulo Rodrigues	6,062	19.5	2	–2
CH	Hugo Fresta	3,098	10.0	1	new
CDU	Paulo Sérgio Ferreira	1,034	3.3	0	±0
BE/L/PAN	Gonçalo Mano	1,007	2.1	0	±0
IL	João Pedro Cardoso	376	1.2	0	±0
Other parties		200	0.6	0	±0
Blank/Invalid ballots		1,037	3.3	–	–
Turnout		31,136	57.15	9	±0
Source: Autárquicas 2025

== Honours ==
=== National ===
- Grand Cross of the Order of Christ (19 January 2010)

=== Foreign ===
- Austria: Grand Decoration of Honour in Gold with Sash of the Decoration of Honour for Services to the Republic of Austria (11 November 2004)
- Brazil: Grand Cross of the National Order of the Southern Cross (28 August 1991 and 31 December 2003)
- Hungary: Grand Cross of the Hungarian Order of Merit (27 October 2002)
- Morocco: Grand Cordon of the Order of Ouissam Alaouite (20 February 1995)

== Bibliography ==
- Co-author with José Manuel Durão Barroso: Sistema de Governo e Sistema Partidário, Livraria Bertrand, 1980
- Portugal e a Europa: Que Futuro?, 1989
- Os Sistemas de Governos Mistos e o actual Sistema Português, Difel Editorial, 2001
- 'Figueira, a Minha História, 2005
- Palavras Escritas, Elo, 2005
- Percepções e Realidade, Alêtheia Editores, 2006
- A Cidade é de todos, Livros d'Hoje, 2009
- Pecado Original, D. Quixote, 2013

== See also ==
- Politics of Portugal
- 2005 Portuguese legislative election
- Social Democratic Party (Portugal)

== Footnotes ==
Political offices
Preceded by José Manuel Barroso	Prime Minister of Portugal; 2004–2005	Succeeded by José Sócrates
