= Opinion polling for the 2009 Portuguese local elections =

In the run up to the 2009 Portuguese local elections, various organisations carried out opinion polling to gauge voting intention in several municipalities across Portugal. Results of such polls are displayed in this article. The date range for these opinion polls are from the previous local elections, held on 9 October 2005, to the day the next elections were held, on 11 October 2009.

== Polling ==
=== Alcobaça ===
| Polling firm/Link | Fieldwork date | Sample size | PSD | PS | CDU | BE | CDS | IND | O | Lead |
|---|---|---|---|---|---|---|---|---|---|---|
| 2009 local election | 11 Oct 2009 | —N/a | 44.9; 4 | 20.9; 2 | 15.3; 1 | 2.6; 0 | 5.2; 0 | 6.7; 0 | 4.4 | 24.0 |
| IPOM | 24–25 Sep 2009 | 596 | 42.8 | 21.4 | 16.0 | 6.6 | 2.2 | 7.6 | 3.4 | 21.4 |
| 2005 local election | 9 Oct 2005 | —N/a | 55.1; 5 | 17.1; 1 | 16.0; 1 | 3.4; 0 | 2.8; 0 | —N/a | 5.6 | 38.0 |

=== Aveiro ===
Exit poll

| Polling firm/Link | Fieldwork date | Sample size | PSD CDS | PS | CDU | BE | O | Lead |
|---|---|---|---|---|---|---|---|---|
| 2009 local election | 11 Oct 2009 | —N/a | 53.8; 6 | 33.1; 3 | 3.7; 0 | 5.1; 0 | 4.4 | 20.7 |
| Intercampus | 11 Oct 2009 | ? | 53.2– 58.8 | 29.8– 35.4 | 1.7– 4.3 | 3.4– 6.0 | – | 23.4 |
| Gemeo/IPAM | 24–27 Jun 2009 | 500 | 55 | 27 | 2 | 8 | 8 | 28 |
| 2005 local election | 9 Oct 2005 | —N/a | 47.5; 5 | 39.3; 4 | 4.4; 0 | 3.5; 0 | 5.2 | 8.2 |

=== Barcelos ===
| Polling firm/Link | Fieldwork date | Sample size | PSD | PS | CDS | BE | CDU | O | Lead |
|---|---|---|---|---|---|---|---|---|---|
| 2009 local election | 11 Oct 2009 | —N/a | 43.4; 5 | 44.5; 6 | 4.7; 0 | 1.8; 0 | 1.5; 0 | 4.2; 0 | 1.1 |
| IPOM | 1–3 Oct 2009 | 789 | 47.0 | 36.5 | 4.1 | 7.6 | 3.0 | 1.8 | 10.5 |
| 2005 local election | 9 Oct 2005 | —N/a | 47.2; 5 | 41.8; 4 | 2.9; 0 | 1.9; 0 | 1.4; 0 | 4.9; 0 | 5.4 |

=== Braga ===
Exit poll

| Polling firm/Link | Fieldwork date | Sample size | PS | PSD CDS PPM | CDU | BE | O/U | Lead |
|---|---|---|---|---|---|---|---|---|
| 2009 local election | 11 Oct 2009 | —N/a | 44.7; 6 | 42.0; 5 | 6.3; 0 | 4.0; 0 | 2.9; 0 | 2.7 |
| Intercampus | 11 Oct 2009 | ? | 45.2– 50.8 | 38.0– 43.6 | 3.4– 7.0 | 2.3– 4.9 | – | 7.2 |
| IPOM | 5–6 Oct 2009 | 794 | 30.0 | 31.5 | 4.2 | 3.1 | 20.1 | 1.5 |
| Eurosondagem | 1–2 Oct 2009 | 530 | 46.9 | 36.9 | 6.9 | 6.0 | 3.3 | 10.0 |
| 2005 local election | 9 Oct 2005 | —N/a | 44.5; 6 | 38.9; 5 | 7.1; 0 | 4.4; 0 | 5.2; 0 | 5.6 |

=== Faro ===
Exit poll

| Polling firm/Link | Fieldwork date | Sample size | PS | PSD CDS MPT PPM | CDU | BE | IND | O | Lead |
|---|---|---|---|---|---|---|---|---|---|
| 2009 local election | 11 Oct 2009 | —N/a | 42.3; 4 | 42.7; 5 | 5.3; 0 | 3.0; 0 | 4.1; 0 | 2.7 | 0.4 |
| Intercampus | 11 Oct 2009 | ? | 38.0– 43.6 | 41.0– 46.6 | 3.6– 6.2 | 1.9– 4.5 | 2.8– 5.4 | – | 3.0 |
| Eurosondagem | 6 Oct 2009 | 503 | 37.0 | 40.5 | 6.1 | 4.8 | 8.0 | 3.6 | 3.5 |
| Intercampus | 3–6 Oct 2009 | 600 | 38.5 | 36.2 | 7.9 | 6.7 | 6.7 | 4.0 | 2.3 |
| Aximage | 2–4 Oct 2009 | 500 | 39.1 | 41.1 | 6.1 | 2.6 | 4.9 | 2.2 | 2.0 |
| 2005 local election | 9 Oct 2005 | —N/a | 41.1; 4 | 39.8; 3 (Note: Sum of the PSD and CDS separate results in 2005.) | 8.9; 0 | 4.6; 0 | —N/a | 5.6; 0 | 1.3 |

=== Horta ===
| Polling firm/Link | Fieldwork date | Sample size | PS | PSD | CDU | CDS | BE | O | Lead |
|---|---|---|---|---|---|---|---|---|---|
| 2009 local election | 11 Oct 2009 | —N/a | 45.2; 4 | 40.6; 3 | 9.2; 0 | 1.5; 0 | 1.2; 0 | 2.3 | 4.6 |
| Eurosondagem | 1–2 Oct 2009 | 505 | 40.0; 3 | 36.9; 3 | 15.3; 1 | 2.2; 0 | 3.6; 0 | 2.0 | 3.1 |
| 2005 local election | 9 Oct 2005 | —N/a | 38.1; 3 | 30.0; 2 | 26.7; 2 | 2.0; 0 | 1.0; 0 | 2.0; 0 | 8.1 |

=== Leiria ===
Exit poll

| Polling firm/Link | Fieldwork date | Sample size | PSD | PS | CDS | BE | CDU | O | Lead |
|---|---|---|---|---|---|---|---|---|---|
| 2009 local election | 11 Oct 2009 | —N/a | 37.6; 5 | 44.9; 5 | 7.7; 1 | 3.4; 0 | 2.4; 0 | 4.1 | 7.3 |
| Intercampus | 11 Oct 2009 | ? | 41.1– 46.7 | 36.5– 42.1 | 7.0– 10.6 | 1.4– 4.0 | 0.6– 3.2 | – | 4.6 |
| IPOM | 29–30 Sep 2009 | 596 | 49.9 | 40.7 | 4.0 | 2.6 | 1.1 | 1.8 | 9.2 |
| 2005 local election | 9 Oct 2005 | —N/a | 42.6; 4 | 35.5; 4 | 9.3; 1 | 3.4; 0 | 2.5; 0 | 6.8 | 7.1 |

=== Lisbon ===
Exit poll

| Polling firm/Link | Fieldwork date | Sample size | PSD CDS MPT PPM | PS | CDU | BE | O | Lead |
|---|---|---|---|---|---|---|---|---|
| 2009 local election | 11 Oct 2009 | —N/a | 38.7; 7 | 44.0; 9 | 8.1; 1 | 4.6; 0 | 4.6; 0 | 5.3 |
| UCP–CESOP | 11 Oct 2009 | ? | 34– 38; 6/7 | 44– 48; 8/9 | 8.5– 10.5; 1/2 | 3– 5; 0/1 | – | 10 |
| Eurosondagem | 11 Oct 2009 | ? | 36.9– 41.1 | 41.2– 45.4 | 6.6– 8.8 | 3.9– 6.1 | – | 4.3 |
| Intercampus | 11 Oct 2009 | ? | 34.7– 40.3 | 42.8– 48.4 | 7.1– 10.7 | 3.0– 5.6 | – | 8.1 |
| Aximage | 6–8 Oct 2009 | 802 | 38.4 | 44.4 | 6.4 | 6.0 | 4.8 | 6.0 |
| Marktest | 5–7 Oct 2009 | 510 | 37.9 | 45.0 | 7.3 | 5.4 | 4.4 | 7.1 |
| UCP–CESOP | 3–6 Oct 2009 | 2,221 | 33 | 45 | 9 | 8 | 5 | 12 |
| Eurosondagem | 1–6 Oct 2009 | 1,022 | 36.9 | 41.9 | 8.4 | 8.0 | 4.8 | 5.0 |
| Intercampus | 28–30 Sep 2009 | 800 | 33.1 | 41.4 | 10.4 | 8.3 | 6.8 | 8.3 |
| Marktest | 31 Aug–2 Sep 2009 | 500 | 32.7 | 43.8 | 7.0 | 9.2 | 7.3 | 8.3 |
| UCP–CESOP | 28 Jun–4 Jul 2009 | 716 | 37 | 38 | 7 | 9 | 9 | 1 |
| 2007 by-election | 15 Jul 2007 | —N/a | 20.5; 3 (Note: Sum of the PSD and CDS separate results in 2007.) | 29.5; 6 | 9.5; 2 | 6.8; 1 | 33.8; 5 | 9.0 |
| 2005 local election | 9 Oct 2005 | —N/a | 48.4; 9 | 26.6; 5 | 11.4; 2 | 7.9; 1 | 5.7; 0 | 21.8 |

=== Loulé ===
| Polling firm/Link | Fieldwork date | Sample size | PSD | PS | BE | CDU | CDS | O | Lead |
|---|---|---|---|---|---|---|---|---|---|
| 2009 local election | 11 Oct 2009 | —N/a | 57.0; 6 | 32.6; 3 | 2.9; 0 | 1.9; 0 | 2.6; 0 | 2.9 | 24.4 |
| IPOM | 3–4 Oct 2009 | 695 | 60.5 | 16.2 | 0.9 | 0.4 | 0.4 | 21.6 | 9.2 |
| 2005 local election | 9 Oct 2005 | —N/a | 51.4; 4 | 37.4; 3 | 2.7; 0 | 2.2; 0 | 1.6; 0 | 4.7 | 14.0 |

=== Lousada ===
| Polling firm/Link | Fieldwork date | Sample size | PS | PSD CDS | CDU | O | Lead |
|---|---|---|---|---|---|---|---|
| 2009 local election | 11 Oct 2009 | —N/a | 57.7; 4 | 37.6; 3 | 2.9; 0 | 1.8 | 20.1 |
| Gemeo/IPAM | 7–8 Set 2009 | 400 | 65 | 28 | 1 | 6 | 37 |
| 2005 local election | 9 Oct 2005 | —N/a | 61.4; 5 | 33.2; 2 | 3.0; 0 | 2.5 | 28.2 |

=== Mangualde ===
| Polling firm/Link | Fieldwork date | Sample size | PSD | PS | CDS | CDU | O | Lead |
|---|---|---|---|---|---|---|---|---|
| 2009 local election | 11 Oct 2009 | —N/a | 35.9; 3 | 58.6; 4 | 2.4; 0 | 1.1; 0 | 2.0 | 22.7 |
| Domp | 24–30 Sep 2009 | 778 | 29.1; 2 | 57.3; 5 | 6.0; 0 | 5.4; 0 | 2.2 | 28.2 |
| 2005 local election | 9 Oct 2005 | —N/a | 47.8; 4 | 44.8; 3 | 2.7; 0 | 1.4; 0 | 3.3; 0 | 3.0 |

=== Matosinhos ===
Exit poll

| Polling firm/Link | Fieldwork date | Sample size | PS | PSD CDS | CDU | BE | NM | O | Lead |
|---|---|---|---|---|---|---|---|---|---|
| 2009 local election | 11 Oct 2009 | —N/a | 42.3; 5 | 17.1; 2 | 4.4; 0 | 2.7; 0 | 30.7; 4 | 2.8; 0 | 11.6 |
| Intercampus | 11 Oct 2009 | ? | 38.0– 43.6 | 11.9– 16.5 | 2.6– 5.2 | 1.4– 4.0 | 32.2– 37.8 | – | 5.8 |
| Aximage | 4–6 Oct 2009 | 500 | 43.0 | 19.1 | 4.1 | 6.7 | 23.5 | 3.6 | 19.5 |
| Eurosondagem | 4–5 Oct 2009 | 534 | 35.3 | 21.1 | 6.0 | 4.7 | 30.2 | 2.7 | 5.1 |
| UCP–CESOP | 2–4 Oct 2009 | 1,257 | 39 | 22 | 4 | 4 | 27 | 4 | 12 |
| IPOM | 30 Jun–1 Jul 2009 | 796 | 32.6 | 20.9 | 4.5 | 5.2 | 34.5 | 2.2 | 1.9 |
| 2005 local election | 9 Oct 2005 | —N/a | 47.3; 6 | 30.9; 4 | 8.6; 1 | 7.0; 0 | —N/a | 6.2; 0 | 16.4 |

=== Oeiras ===
Exit poll

| Polling firm/Link | Fieldwork date | Sample size | IM | PSD CDS PPM | PS | CDU | BE | O | Lead |
|---|---|---|---|---|---|---|---|---|---|
| 2009 local election | 11 Oct 2009 | —N/a | 41.5; 5 | 16.4; 2 | 25.8; 3 | 7.3; 1 | 3.9; 4 | 5.1; 0 | 15.7 |
| Intercampus | 11 Oct 2009 | ? | 40.0– 45.6 | 14.2– 18.8 | 23.3– 28.9 | 5.0– 8.6 | 2.4– 5.0 | – | 16.7 |
| UCP–CESOP | 2–5 Oct 2009 | 1,307 | 42 | 16 | 25 | 7 | 6 | 4 | 17 |
| Eurosondagem | 29–30 Sep 2009 | 548 | 41.1 | 18.8 | 23.1 | 8.3 | 5.2 | 3.5 | 18.0 |
| 2005 local election | 9 Oct 2005 | —N/a | 34.1; 4 | 32.1; 4 | 15.6; 2 | 7.9; 1 | 4.8; 0 | 5.5; 0 | 2.0 |

=== Oliveira do Bairro ===
| Polling firm/Link | Fieldwork date | Sample size | PSD | CDS | PS | CDU | O/U | Lead |
|---|---|---|---|---|---|---|---|---|
| 2009 local election | 11 Oct 2009 | —N/a | 53.6; 4 | 31.5; 2 | 10.7; 1 | 1.2; 0 | 3.0 | 22.1 |
| Gemeo/IPAM | 16–18 Sep 2009 | 400 | 23 | 11 | 2 | 1 | 63 | 12 |
| 2005 local election | 9 Oct 2005 | —N/a | 44.2; 4 | 41.2; 3 | 9.0; 0 | 1.7; 0 | 3.9 | 3.0 |

=== Paços de Ferreira ===
| Polling firm/Link | Fieldwork date | Sample size | PSD | PS | CDS | CDU | O | Lead |
|---|---|---|---|---|---|---|---|---|
| 2009 local election | 11 Oct 2009 | —N/a | 52.4; 4 | 41.6; 3 | 2.4; 0 | 1.9; 0 | 1.7 | 10.8 |
| Gemeo/IPAM | 14–15 Sep 2009 | 400 | 59 | 31 | 3 | 2 | 5 | 28 |
| 2005 local election | 9 Oct 2005 | —N/a | 59.0; 5 | 29.7; 2 | 5.5; 0 | 2.8; 0 | 3.0 | 29.3 |

=== Paredes ===
| Polling firm/Link | Fieldwork date | Sample size | PSD | PS | CDS | CDU | BE | O | Lead |
|---|---|---|---|---|---|---|---|---|---|
| 2009 local election | 11 Oct 2009 | —N/a | 57.8; 6 | 26.5; 3 | 8.5; 0 | 3.3; 0 | 1.5; 0 | 2.4 | 31.3 |
| Gemeo/IPAM | 16–17 Sep 2009 | 400 | 59 | 21 | 13 | 2 | 2 | 3 | 38 |
| 2005 local election | 9 Oct 2005 | —N/a | 50.9; 5 | 30.3; 3 | 9.2; 1 | 4.2; 0 | 1.9; 0 | 3.4 | 20.6 |

=== Penafiel ===
| Polling firm/Link | Fieldwork date | Sample size | PSD CDS | PS | CDU | BE | O | Lead |
|---|---|---|---|---|---|---|---|---|
| 2009 local election | 11 Oct 2009 | —N/a | 64.2; 6 | 29.7; 3 | 3.0; 0 | 1.3; 0 | 1.8 | 34.5 |
| Gemeo/IPAM | 8–9 Sep 2009 | 400 | 66 | 28 | 2 | 1 | 3 | 38 |
| 2005 local election | 9 Oct 2005 | —N/a | 62.0; 6 | 30.1; 3 | 3.8; 0 | 1.4; 0 | 2.7 | 31.9 |

=== Porto ===
Exit poll

| Polling firm/Link | Fieldwork date | Sample size | PSD CDS | PS | CDU | BE | O | Lead |
|---|---|---|---|---|---|---|---|---|
| 2009 local election | 11 Oct 2009 | —N/a | 47.5; 7 | 34.7; 5 | 9.8; 1 | 5.0; 0 | 3.0; 0 | 12.8 |
| UCP–CESOP | 11 Oct 2009 | ? | 45–49; 6/7 | 33–37; 5/6 | 8.5–10.5; 0/1 | 4–6; 0 | – | 12 |
| Eurosondagem | 11 Oct 2009 | ? | 43.3– 47.1; 6/7 | 35.5– 39.9; 5/6 | 7.9– 10.1; 0/1 | 3.9– 5.7; 0 | – | 7.2– 7.8 |
| Intercampus | 11 Oct 2009 | ? | 44.9– 50.5 | 31.3– 36.8 | 7.8– 11.4 | 3.3– 6.9 | – | 13.6– 13.7 |
| Marktest | 2–7 Oct 2009 | 400 | 51.0 | 31.0 | 7.8 | 5.7 | 4.7 | 20.0 |
| UCP–CESOP | 2–5 Oct 2009 | 2,571 | 47 | 33 | 9 | 7 | 4 | 14 |
| Aximage | 2–4 Oct 2009 | 500 | 46.4 | 34.3 | 9.7 | 5.8 | 3.8 | 12.1 |
| Eurosondagem | 28–30 Sep 2009 | 736 | 48.0 | 33.3 | 9.4 | 5.8 | 3.5 | 14.7 |
| Intercampus | 28–30 Sep 2009 | 800 | 44.4 | 35.9 | 8.2 | 7.9 | 3.6 | 8.5 |
| Marktest | 3–6 Sep 2009 | 399 | 44.7 | 31.1 | 9.6 | 7.8 | 6.8 | 13.6 |
| IPOM | 16–19 Jun 2009 | 797 | 55.2 | 23.5 | 9.2 | 8.1 | 4.1 | 31.7 |
| UCP–CESOP | 8–9 Jun 2009 | 1,002 | 54 | 23 | 4 | 7 | 12 | 31 |
| 2005 local election | 9 Oct 2005 | —N/a | 46.2; 7 | 36.1; 5 | 9.0; 1 | 4.2; 0 | 4.5; 0 | 10.1 |

=== Santa Cruz ===
| Polling firm/Link | Fieldwork date | Sample size | PSD | PS | CDU | JPP | O | Lead |
|---|---|---|---|---|---|---|---|---|
| 2009 local election | 11 Oct 2009 | —N/a | 41.9; 3 | 13.0; 1 | 5.0; 0 | 32.0; 3 | 8.1; 0 | 9.9 |
| Eurosondagem | 2 Oct 2009 | 310 | 51.1 | 28.2 | 4.9 | 10.2 | 5.6 | 21.4 |
| 2005 local election | 9 Oct 2005 | —N/a | 46.8; 4 | 40.4; 3 | 3.3; 0 | —N/a | 9.6; 0 | 6.4 |

=== Santa Maria da Feira ===
| Polling firm/Link | Fieldwork date | Sample size | PSD | PS | CDS | CDU | BE | O | Lead |
|---|---|---|---|---|---|---|---|---|---|
| 2009 local election | 11 Oct 2009 | —N/a | 48.1; 6 | 40.6; 5 | 3.5; 0 | 2.5; 0 | 2.6; 0 | 2.7 | 7.5 |
| GTriplo | 15–16 Sep 2009 | 502 | 30.1 | 31.7 | 2.2 | 2.0 | 3.2 | 30.8 | 1.6 |
| 2005 local election | 9 Oct 2005 | —N/a | 49.0; 6 | 39.5; 5 | 3.1; 0 | 2.6; 0 | 2.0; 0 | 3.8 | 9.5 |

=== Santarém ===
| Polling firm/Link | Fieldwork date | Sample size | PSD | PS | CDU | BE | CDS | O | Lead |
|---|---|---|---|---|---|---|---|---|---|
| 2009 local election | 11 Oct 2009 | —N/a | 64.2; 7 | 21.2; 2 | 5.7; 0 | 2.4; 0 | 3.6; 0 | 2.9 | 43.0 |
| Intercampus | 3–6 Oct 2009 | 600 | 53.2 | 27.2 | 8.6 | 4.2 | 4.4 | 2.4 | 26.0 |
| 2005 local election | 9 Oct 2005 | —N/a | 41.4; 4 | 37.8; 4 | 12.2; 1 | 2.5; 0 | 2.3; 0 | 3.8 | 3.6 |

=== São João da Madeira ===
| Polling firm/Link | Fieldwork date | Sample size | PSD | PS | CDS | CDU | BE | O | Lead |
|---|---|---|---|---|---|---|---|---|---|
| 2009 local election | 11 Oct 2009 | —N/a | 56.0; 5 | 26.4; 2 | 7.2; 0 | 5.8; 0 | 2.7; 0 | 2.1 | 29.6 |
| Domp | 21–26 Sep 2009 | 604 | 66.7; 6 | 15.3; 1 | 7.4; 0 | 4.7; 0 | 3.3; 0 | 2.6 | 51.4 |
| 2005 local election | 9 Oct 2005 | —N/a | 56.3; 5 | 19.8; 1 | 12.7; 1 | 5.0; 0 | 2.6; 0 | 3.6 | 36.5 |

=== Setúbal ===
Exit poll

| Polling firm/Link | Fieldwork date | Sample size | CDU | PSD | PS | BE | CDS | O | Lead |
|---|---|---|---|---|---|---|---|---|---|
| 2009 local election | 11 Oct 2009 | —N/a | 38.8; 5 | 14.5; 1 | 29.8; 3 | 6.1; 0 | 5.8; 0 | 5.0; 0 | 9.0 |
| Intercampus | 11 Oct 2009 | ? | 40.3– 45.9 | 11.8– 13.4 | 23.1– 28.7 | 4.3– 7.9 | 5.1– 8.7 | – | 17.2 |
| Eurosondagem | 28–29 Sep 2009 | 510 | 37.9 | 16.2 | 29.4 | 7.8 | 5.2 | 3.5 | 8.5 |
| 2005 local election | 9 Oct 2005 | —N/a | 40.4; 4 | 25.4; 3 | 21.2; 2 | 5.2; 0 | 1.5; 0 | 6.3; 0 | 15.0 |

=== Trofa ===
| Polling firm/Link | Fieldwork date | Sample size | PSD | PS | CDS | CDU | O | Lead |
|---|---|---|---|---|---|---|---|---|
| 2009 local election | 11 Oct 2009 | —N/a | 43.4; 3 | 46.2; 4 | 5.7; 0 | 2.4; 0 | 2.3 | 2.8 |
| IPOM | 28 Aug–1 Sep 2009 | 796 | 54.4 | 31.4 | 5.8 | 2.7 | 5.8 | 23.0 |
| 2005 local election | 9 Oct 2005 | —N/a | 48.4; 4 | 37.1; 3 | 6.9; 0 | 3.6; 0 | 4.1; 0 | 11.3 |

=== Valongo ===
| Polling firm/Link | Fieldwork date | Sample size | PSD CDS | PS | CDU | BE | IND | O/U | Lead |
|---|---|---|---|---|---|---|---|---|---|
| 2009 local election | 11 Oct 2009 | —N/a | 34.3; 4 | 27.2; 3 | 4.6; 0 | 2.7; 0 | 22.9; 2 | 8.3; 0 | 7.1 |
| IPOM | 20–22 Jul 2009 | 799 | 26.2 | 10.3 | 1.8 | 1.5 | 9.4 | 50.8 | 15.9 |
| 2005 local election | 9 Oct 2005 | —N/a | 44.2; 5 (Note: In the 2005 elections, the PSD ran alone and CDS didn't present a candidacy.) | 40.6; 4 | 6.6; 0 | 3.9; 0 | —N/a | 4.7 | 3.6 |

=== Viana do Castelo ===
Exit poll

| Polling firm/Link | Fieldwork date | Sample size | PS | PSD CDS | CDU | BE | O | Lead |
|---|---|---|---|---|---|---|---|---|
| 2009 local election | 11 Oct 2009 | —N/a | 50.2; 4 | 35.1; 3 | 6.6; 0 | 4.8; 0 | 3.3 | 15.1 |
| Intercampus | 11 Oct 2009 | ? | 49.8– 55.4 | 30.4– 36.0 | 5.2– 8.8 | 3.5– 6.1 | – | 19.4 |
| Intercampus | 3–6 Oct 2009 | 600 | 48.9 | 40.5 | 5.5 | 3.9 | 1.2 | 8.4 |
| 2005 local election | 9 Oct 2005 | —N/a | 49.0; 6 | 35.6; 3 | 5.5; 0 | 3.1; 0 | 6.8; 0 | 13.4 |

=== Vila Nova de Gaia ===
| Polling firm/Link | Fieldwork date | Sample size | PSD CDS | PS | CDU | BE | O/U | Lead |
|---|---|---|---|---|---|---|---|---|
| 2009 local election | 11 Oct 2009 | —N/a | 62.0; 8 | 25.3; 3 | 6.3; 0 | 3.2; 0 | 3.2; 0 | 36.7 |
| IPOM | 10–15 Jul 2009 | 800 | 62.1 | 20.5 | 8.7 | 5.2 | 3.6 | 41.6 |
| 2005 local election | 9 Oct 2005 | —N/a | 55.0; 7 | 28.0; 3 | 8.3; 1 | 3.8; 0 | 4.9; 0 | 27.0 |
