= 2007 Lisbon local by-election =

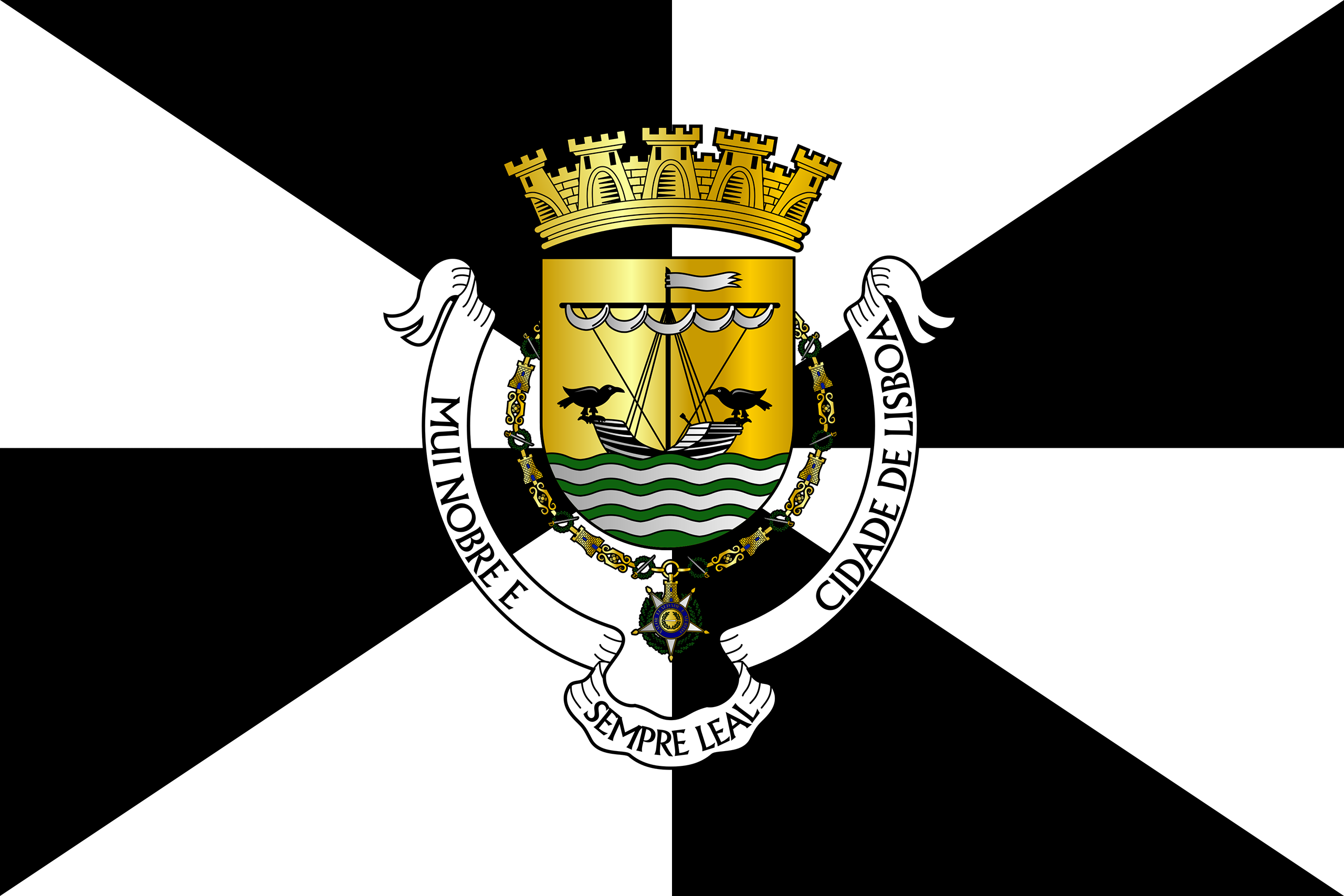
- 15 July 2007

All 17 Councillors in the Lisbon City Council 9 seats needed for a majority
- Opinion polls
- Turnout: 36.7% ▼16.0 pp
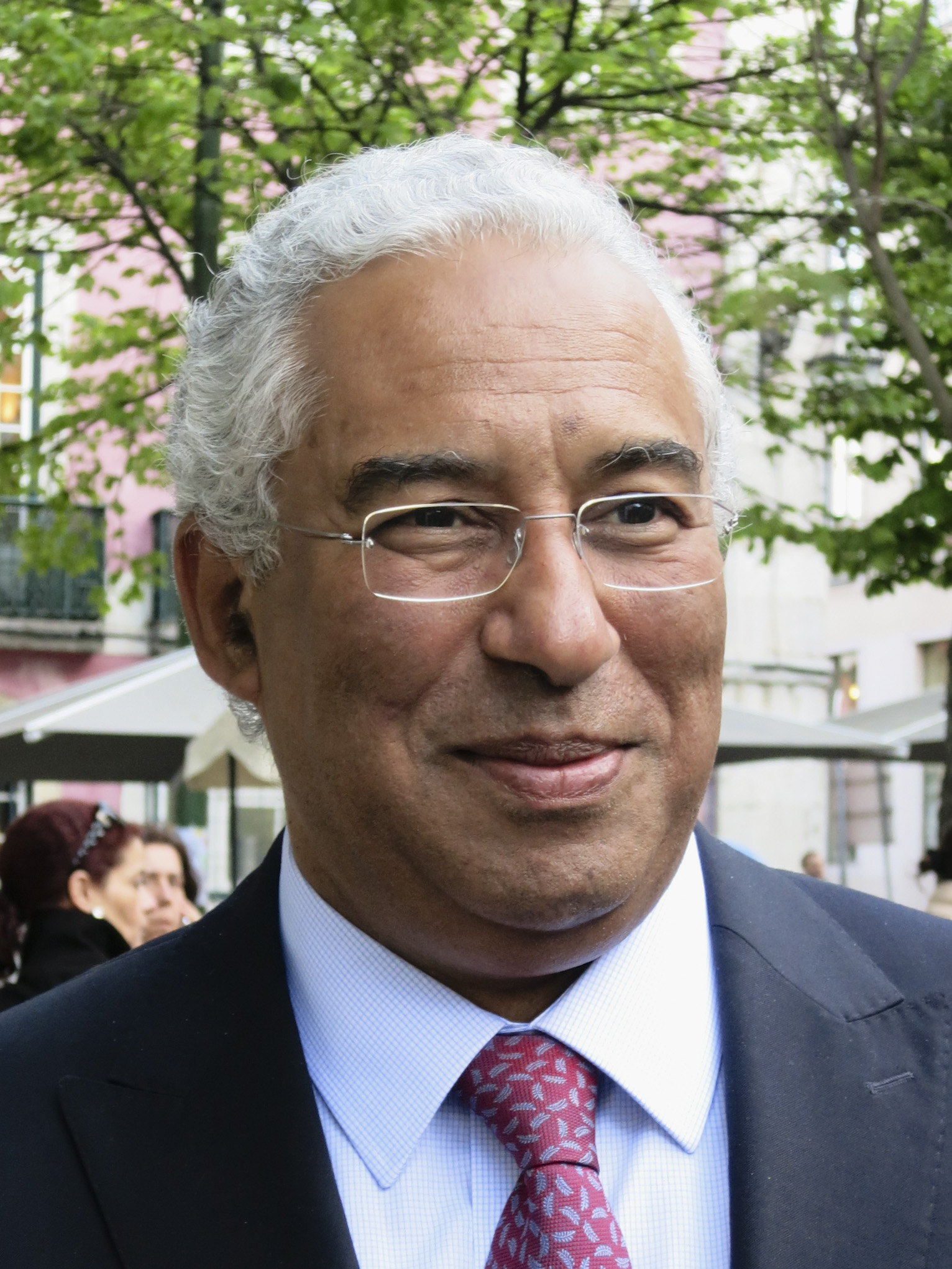

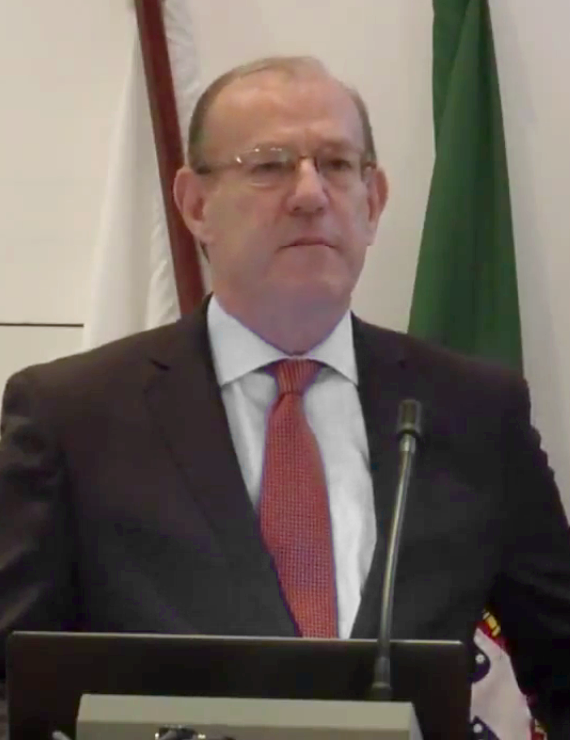

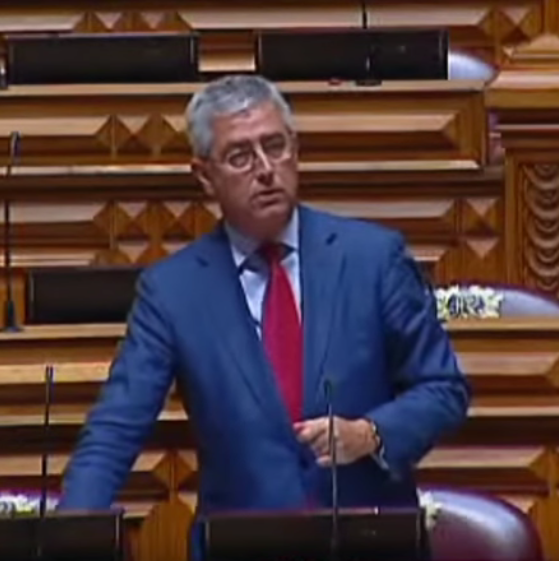

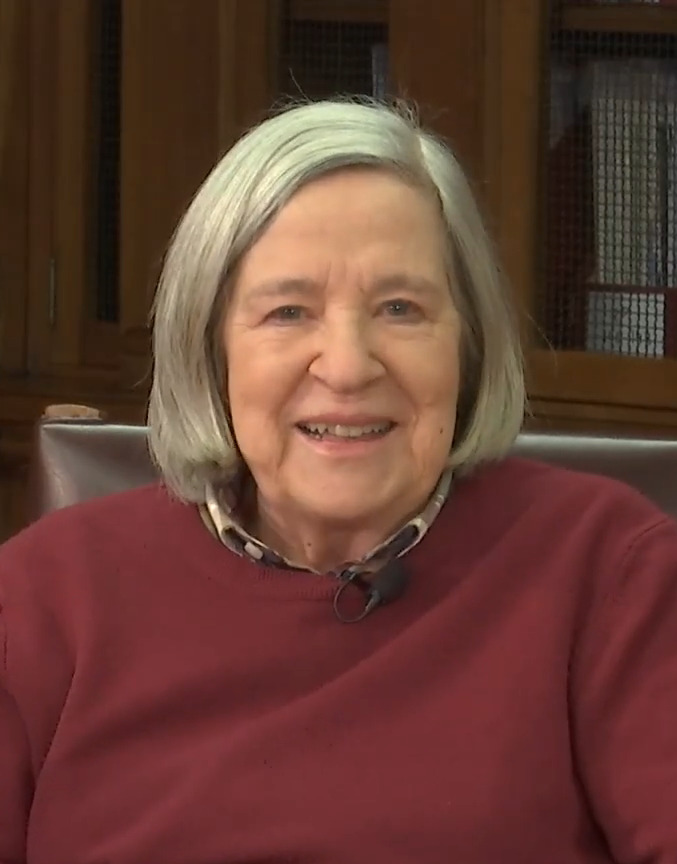

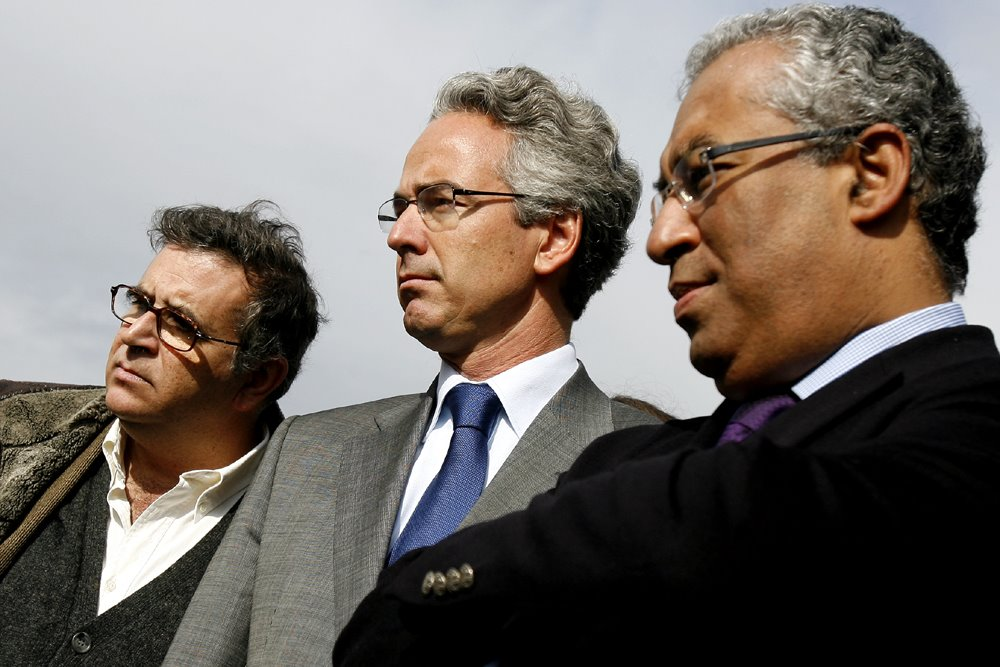
	First party	Second party	Third party
Leader	António Costa	Carmona Rodrigues	Fernando Negrão
Party	PS	Independent	PSD
Alliance		Lisbon with Carmona
Last election	5 seats, 26.6%	Did not contest	8 seats, 42.4%
Seats won	6	3	3
Seat change	▲1	New party	▼5
Popular vote	56,732	31,990	30,401
Percentage	29.5%	16.6%	15.8%
Swing	▲2.9 pp	New party	▼26.6 pp
	Fourth party	Fifth party	Sixth party
Leader	Helena Roseta	Ruben de Carvalho	José Sá Fernandes
Party	Independent	PCP	BE
Alliance	Citizens for Lisbon	CDU
Last election	Did not contest	2 seats, 11.4%	1 seats, 7.9%
Seats won	2	2	1
Seat change	New party	Steady	Steady
Popular vote	19,754	18,163	13,132
Percentage	10.3%	9.4%	6.8%
Swing	New party	▼2.0 pp	▼1.1 pp
Mayor before election
Marina Ferreira
PSD
Elected Mayor
António Costa
PS

The 2007 Lisbon local by-election was held on 15 July 2007 to elect a new mayor and members of the Lisbon City Council, in order to complete the term started in 2005 following the collapse of Mayor Carmona Rodrigues' local government.

In the first, and still only, mayoral by-election in Lisbon's history, António Costa, by then Minister of Internal Administration under Prime Minister José Sócrates, was elected with almost 30 percent of the votes, electing six councillors, and would complete the term started in 2005 and to be finished by 2009.

The election resulted in a very fragmented local council, with former mayor Carmona Rodrigues Independent movement, Lisbon with Carmona, polling second with around 17 percent of the votes and electing 3 councillors. The Social Democratic Party (PSD) suffered a massive defeat, polling third with less than 16 percent of the votes, a loss of 27 percentage points compared with 2005, and electing only 3 councilors, a loss of five.

Another independent led by Helena Roseta, called Citizens for Lisbon, that congregated center-left to leftwing movements, gathered more than 10 percent of the votes and elected two councillors. The Unitary Democratic Coalition presented Ruben de Carvalho as their mayoral candidate and won 9 percent of the votes and retained the two seats from 2005. The Left Bloc presented José Sá Fernandes as candidate for Mayor, which was reelected as councillor. The CDS – People's Party (CDS–PP) was wiped out from Lisbon City Council.

Turnout was the lowest ever, with just 36.7 percent of voters casting a ballot, a drop of 16 percentage points compared with 2005.

== Background ==
In the 2005 election, the Social Democratic Party led by Carmona Rodrigues, won a landslide victory with 42 percent of the votes and 8 councillors, defeating the Socialist Party candidate, Manuel Maria Carrilho, by a wide margin, which only gain 26.6 percent of the votes and 5 councillors. CDU won 2 councillors, while BE and CDS–PP gained just one.

By 2007, a crisis in the management of the city erupted because of urban development plans regarding a company called Bragaparques. These plans were highly controversial and led to an investigation by the Public Prosecution Office. Then PSD leader, Luís Marques Mendes withdrew his support from Carmona and asked PSD councillors to resign, which led to the fall of Carmona's local government and the calling of a by-election.

== Electoral system ==
Each party or coalition must present a list of candidates. The winner of the most voted list for the municipal council is automatically elected mayor, similar to first-past-the-post (FPTP). The lists are closed and the seats in each municipality are apportioned according to the D'Hondt method. Unlike in national legislative elections, independent lists are allowed to run.

== Parties and candidates ==
Party/Coalition		Political position	Candidate	2005 result	
Party/Coalition		Political position	Candidate	Votes (%)	Seats
PPD/PSD	Social Democratic Party; Partido Social Democrata	Centre-right	Fernando Negrão	42.4%	8 / 17
PS	Socialist Party; Partido Socialista	Centre-left	António Costa	26.6%	5 / 17
CDU	Unitary Democratic Coalition; Coligação Democrática Unitária PCP, PEV	Left-wing to far-left	Ruben de Carvalho	11.4%	2 / 17
BE	Left Bloc; Bloco de Esquerda	Left-wing to far-left	José Sá Fernandes	7.9%	1 / 17
CDS–PP	CDS – People's Party; CDS – Partido Popular	Right-wing	Telmo Correia	5.9%	1 / 17
PCTP	Portuguese Workers' Communist Party; Partido Comunista dos Trabalhadores Portugueses	Far-left	António Garcia Pereira	1.0%	0 / 17
PNR	National Renovator Party; Partido Nacional Renovador	Far-right	José Pinto Coelho	0.3%	0 / 17
PND	New Democracy Party; Partido Nova Democracia	Right-wing	Manuel Monteiro	—N/a	—N/a
PPM	People's Monarchist Party; Partido Popular Democrático	Right-wing	Gonçalo da Câmara Pereira	—N/a	—N/a
MPT	Earth Party; Partido da Terra	Centre-right	Pedro Quartin Graça	—N/a	—N/a
LCC	Lisbon with Carmona; Lisboa com Carmona	Centre-right	Carmona Rodrigues	—N/a	—N/a
CPL	Citizens for Lisbon; Cidadãos por Lisboa	Centre-left	Helena Roseta	—N/a	—N/a

== Opinion polling ==
Exit poll

Polling firm/Link	Fieldwork date	Sample size	PSD	PS	CDU	BE	CDS	LCC	CPL	O	Lead
2007 local by-election	15 Jul 2007	—N/a	15.8; 3	29.5; 6	9.4; 2	6.8; 1	3.7; 0	16.6; 3	10.2; 2	8.0; 0	12.9
UCP–CESOP	15 Jul 2007	?	12– 15; 2/3	29–34; 6	9– 11; 2	7– 9; 1	2– 4; 0	15– 19; 3/4	10– 12; 2	–	14– 15
Aximage	11–12 Jul 2007	780	16.3	34.2	10.2	4.8	2.5	16.9	9.5	5.6	17.3
Intercampus	6–11 Jul 2007	959	15.1	37.1	13.6	7.4	2.4	16.0	4.5	3.9	21.1
Marktest	10 Jul 2007	610	12.3	32.0	7.0	5.8	2.1	15.8	12.1	12.9	16.2
Eurosondagem	8–10 Jul 2007	1,559	18.4	32.5	7.7	5.5	4.0	15.9	12.1	3.9	14.1
UCP–CESOP	7–10 Jul 2007	2,023	15	33	9	8	4	12	11	8	18
Marktest	3–4 Jul 2007	605	13.3	34.1	7.7	6.5	1.5	15.5	14.3	7.1	18.6
Intercampus	29 Jun–4 Jul 2007	800	17.5	34.7	12.2	6.0	3.2	14.9	6.5	5.0	17.2
Aximage	18–20 Jun 2007	550	14.1	39.8	10.2	4.8	1.8	15.0	11.0	3.3	24.8
Intercampus	8–13 Jun 2007	804	19.5	31.1	9.1	9.6	2.5	13.7	9.1	5.4	11.6
Data Crítica	28–29 May 2007	600	18.6	37.4	4.7	4.4	1.4	16.0	17.0	0.5	18.8
Eurosondagem	21–23 May 2007	1,525	14.8	32.1	6.3	5.0	3.8	16.9	15.9	5.2	15.2
Marktest	16–17 May 2007	600	12.1	32.0	7.8	6.4	1.1	19.9	17.2	3.6	12.1
2005 local election	10 Oct 2005	—N/a	42.4; 8	26.6; 5	11.4; 2	7.9; 1	5.9; 1	—N/a	—N/a	5.8; 0	15.8

== Results ==
=== Municipal Council ===
Summary of the 15 July 2007 Lisbon City Council by-election results
Graph of the party split among 17 seats.
Parties	Votes	%	±pp swing	Councillors	
Parties	Votes	%	±pp swing	Total	±
Socialist	56,732	29.49	▲2.9	6	▲1
Lisbon with Carmona	31,990	16.63	—N/a	3	—N/a
Social Democratic	30,401	15.80	▼26.6	3	▼5
Citizens for Lisbon	19,754	10.27	—N/a	2	—N/a
Unitary Democratic Coalition	18,163	9.44	▼2.0	2	0
Left Bloc	13,132	6.83	▼1.1	1	0
People's	7,148	3.72	▼2.2	0	▼1
Portuguese Workers' Communist	3,021	1.57	▲0.6	0	0
National Renovator	1,599	0.83	▲0.5	0	0
New Democracy	1,182	0.61	—N/a	0	—N/a
Earth	1,019	0.53	—N/a	0	—N/a
People's Monarchist	730	0.30	—N/a	0	—N/a
Total valid	184,871	96.11	▲0.5	17	0
Blank ballots	4,622	2.40	▲0.5		
Invalid ballots	2,861	1.49	▲0.2		
Total	192,354	100.00			
Registered voters/turnout	524,140	36.70	▼16.0		
Source: Lisbon 2007 election results
