= Carmona Rodrigues =

Portuguese politician

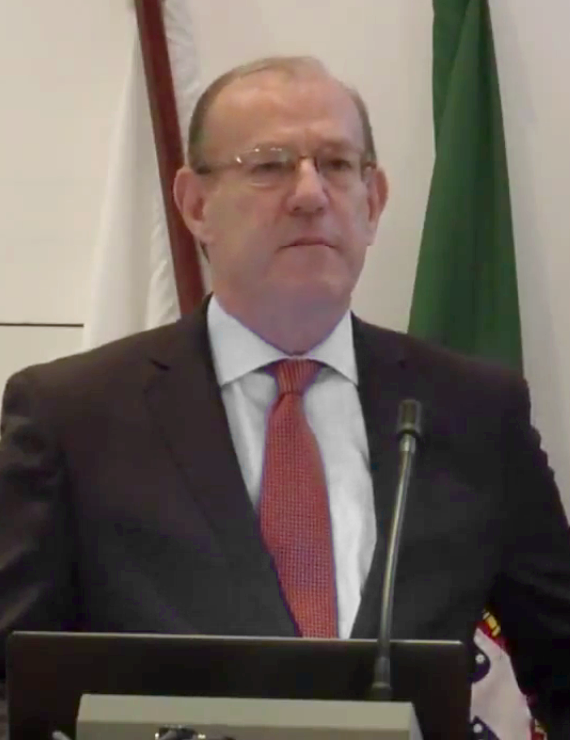

Mayor of Lisbon
- In office 28 October 2005 – 18 May 2007
- Preceded by: Pedro Santana Lopes
- Succeeded by: António Costa
- In office 16 July 2004 – 15 March 2005
- Preceded by: Pedro Santana Lopes
- Succeeded by: Pedro Santana Lopes

Minister of Public Works, Transport and Communications
- In office 5 April 2003 – 16 July 2004
- Prime Minister: José Manuel Barroso
- Preceded by: Luís Valente de Oliveira
- Succeeded by: António Mexia

Personal details
- Born: 23 June 1956 (age 69) São Sebastião da Pedreira, Lisbon, Lisbon, Portugal
- Party: Social Democratic Party

António Pedro Nobre Carmona Rodrigues (Portuguese pronunciation: [kaɾˈmonɐ ʁuˈðɾiɣɨʃ]; born 23 June 1956 in Alvalade, Lisbon), grand-nephew of Óscar Carmona, is a university professor and a Portuguese politician. He was mayor of Lisbon (2004–2005, 2005–2007), and Minister of Public Works, Transportation and Habitation and the Minister of Cities in the 15th Constitutional Government of Portugal.

== Background ==
He is the son of António Óscar Carmona Rodrigues (Chaves, 17 December 1913 – 25 May 1975), a maternal nephew of his namesake António Óscar Fragoso Carmona, and wife Diogilda Nobre de Carvalho (Mafra, 14 February 1918 – 27 September 2009).

== Engineering ==
In 1978, Carmona Rodrigues obtained a degree in Civil Engineering at the Military Academy, in Lisbon. He started his professional career at Hidroprojecto, a large consulting firm in Portugal. Between 1981 and 1982, he made a post-graduation course in Hydraulic Engineering at IHE Delft, The Netherlands.

Upon returning to Portugal, he was invited to be an Assistant of the Department of Sciences and Environmental Engineering, part of the NOVA School of Science and Technology of the New University of Lisbon, where he has worked since 1983. In 1992, Carmona Rodrigues became a Doctor of Environmental Engineering through the NOVA University of Lisbon. Since then, he has been responsible for the courses of Hydraulics, Water Resources and Hydrological Modelling, and responsible for the Hydraulics Laboratory "Prof. Armando Lencastre".

He has participated and was responsible for several research projects, namely in the areas of water resources and water quality modelling. Published five books and more than eighty articles in national and international magazines and conferences. Adviser of several MSc and PhD thesis in the area of water resources and was invited to be a member of various academic juries.

He was involved in several important projects in Portugal and some abroad, including water resources planning, mathematical modelling studies, hydraulic works, river training and environmental impact studies. He is a member of the Portuguese Academy of Engineering, the National Water Council, the Portuguese Commission of Large Dams, the Portuguese Order of Engineers, and was the President of the Portuguese Association of Water Resources.

== Entry into politics ==
For the local elections of December 2001, he integrated the candidate list headed by Santana Lopes Partido Social Democrata (PSD - Social Democratic Party) as an independent. He became vice-Mayor of Lisbon in January 2002.

=== 15th Constitutional Government ===
In April 2003 Rodrigues was integrated into the 15th Constitutional Government of Portugal as Minister of the Public Works, Transportation and Habitation. He spent 15 months in the post, during which many advancements were made, such as the creation of metropolitan authorities of transports, a Spanish-Portuguese agreement on the construction of high-speed rail lines, and legislation for the creation of the societies of urbane rehabilitation.

With the inauguration of the 16th Constitutional Government of Portugal in July 2004, he returned to Lisbon city hall as Mayor, an office he held for eight months. In March 2005, with the fall of the 16th Constitutional Government and the return of Santana Lopes to the municipal government, Carmona Rodrigues took the vice-presidency of the city government over again.

=== Mayoral election ===
In October 2005, Carmona Rodrigues won the mayoral election, once again becoming Mayor of Lisbon, as an independent candidate supported by the Partido Social Democrata (PSD - Social Democratic Party). The results in the city's team of vereadores (municipal government) were: eight to PSD, five to PS, two to the communist coalition, one to CDS-PP and one to the Left Bloc.

In 2007, following the fall of the municipal executive, there were midterm elections which occurred on 15 July 2007. He ran as a candidate with an independent movement that he created for that purpose and ended up in second place with 16.7% of the votes (behind António Costa (PS). This was one of the first important electoral results of independent movements in Portugal municipal elections. This Lisboa com Carmona movement elected four city councilors. He left active politics in 2009.

== Family ==
He married Maria Isabel Giménez-Salinas Moreira Ribeiro, daughter of Fernando Moreira Ribeiro and wife Spanish María de la Concepción Giménez-Salinas y Martín, by whom he has three daughters:

- Margarida Moreira Ribeiro Carmona Rodrigues (b. 1987)
- Joana Moreira Ribeiro Carmona Rodrigues (b. 1990)
- Isabel Moreira Ribeiro Carmona Rodrigues (b. 1992)

He divorced and later married Ana Margarida Salina Ferro de Beça, by whom he has one son:

- António Ferro de Beça Carmona Rodrigues (b. 2010)

== Distinctions ==
Public praise, Gazette (Diário da República), II Série, 23/11/1995.

Grand Officer of the Order of Merit, Republic of Austria (2005).

Grand Cross, White Star 1st Class, Republic of Estonia (2006).

== Sports ==
Former rugby athlete, playing for the Portuguese club CDUL between 1970 and 1986, national champion in all the age categories, winner of several national cups and the Iberian Cup in 1983.

== Electoral history ==
=== Lisbon City Council election, 2005 ===
Ballot: 9 October 2005
Party	Candidate	Votes	%	Seats	+/−
PSD	Carmona Rodrigues	119,824	42.4	8	±0
PS	Manuel Maria Carillho	75,050	26.6	5	–2
CDU	Ruben de Carvalho	32,244	11.2	2	+1
BE	José Sá Fernandes	22,366	7.9	1	+1
CDS–PP	Maria José Nogueira Pinto	16,721	5.9	1	±0
Other parties		3,987	1.4	0	±0
Blank/Invalid ballots		12,280	4.4	–	–
Turnout		282,442	52.55	17	±0
Source: Autárquicas 2005

=== Lisbon City Council by-election, 2007 ===
Ballot: 15 July 2007
Party	Candidate	Votes	%	Seats	+/−
PS	António Costa	56,732	29.5	6	+1
Ind.	Carmona Rodrigues	31,990	16.6	3	new
PSD	Fernando Negrão	30,401	15.8	3	–5
Ind.	Helena Roseta	19,754	10.3	2	new
CDU	Ruben de Carvalho	18,163	9.4	2	±0
BE	José Sá Fernandes	13,132	6.8	1	±0
CDS–PP	Telmo Correia	7,148	3.7	0	–1
PCTP/MRPP	Garcia Pereira	3,021	1.6	0	±0
Other parties		4,530	2.3	0	±0
Blank/Invalid ballots		7,483	3.9	–	–
Turnout		192,354	36.70	17	±0
Source: Intercalares 2007
