= Ruben de Carvalho =

Portuguese politician, journalist and author

Ruben de Carvalho ComIH

Member of the Assembly of the Republic
- In office 1995–1999
- Constituency: Setúbal

Lisbon City Council member
- In office 2005–2013

Portuguese Communist Party Central Committee member
- In office 1997–2019

Personal details
- Born: Ruben Luís Tristão de Carvalho e Silva; 21 July 1944; Lisbon, Portugal
- Died: 11 June 2019 (aged 74); Lisbon, Portugal
- Political party: Portuguese Communist Party

Ruben Luís Tristão de Carvalho e Silva (Lisbon, 21 July 1944 – Lisbon, 11 June 2019) was a Portuguese politician, cultural organizer, historian, and journalist. He was a dissident during the Estado Novo dictatorship, a leader of the Portuguese Communist Party, a member of the Assembly of the Republic, a Lisbon municipal councillor and the creator of the largest political party event in Portugal, the Avante! Festival.

As a journalist, Ruben de Carvalho was editor-in-chief of Vida mundial magazine during the 1960s and the weekly Avante! newspaper between April 1974 and 1995, and was an opinion writer for several newspapers, including Diário de Notícias.

In addition to his journalistic career and political activities, he was well-known as a music-lover, in particular of the Jazz, Blues — of which he was considered an expert — and Fado genres, having written several books about the latter genre. His books on Fado had an outsized importance for the understanding of this musical genre.
