= Santa Clara, Lisbon =

Santa Clara
- Civil parish
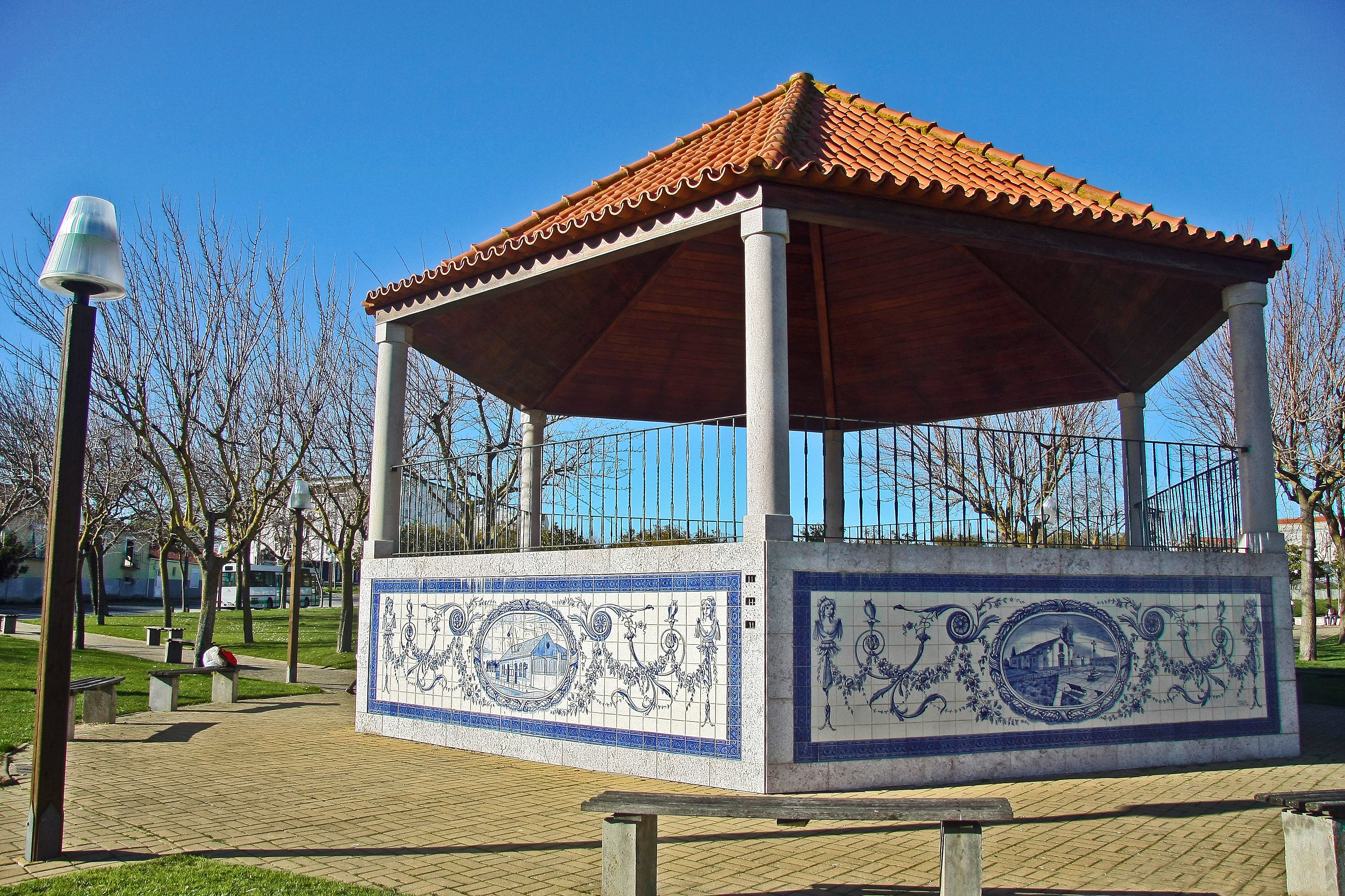
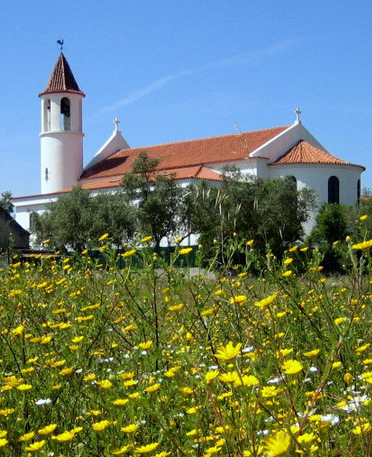
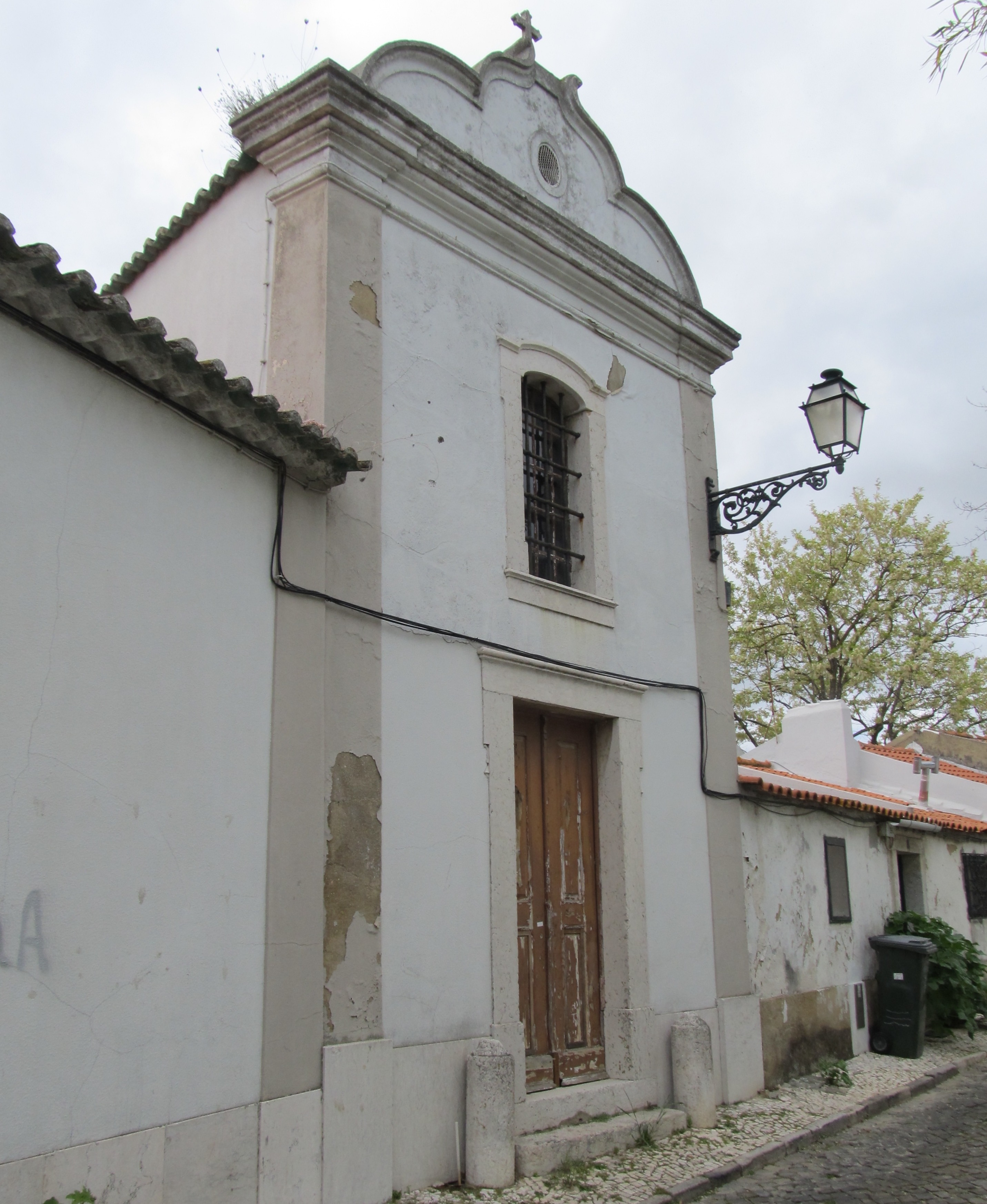
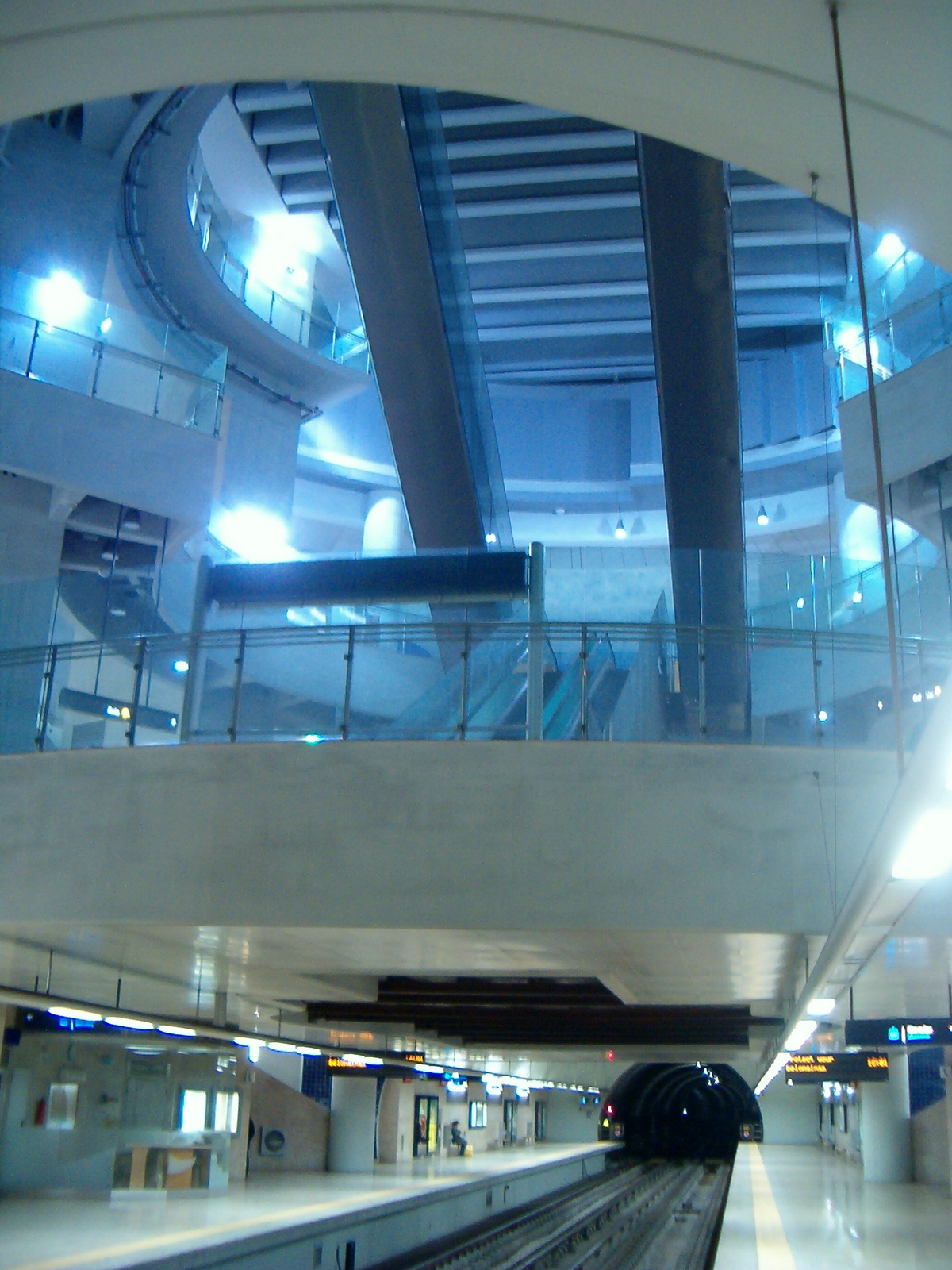
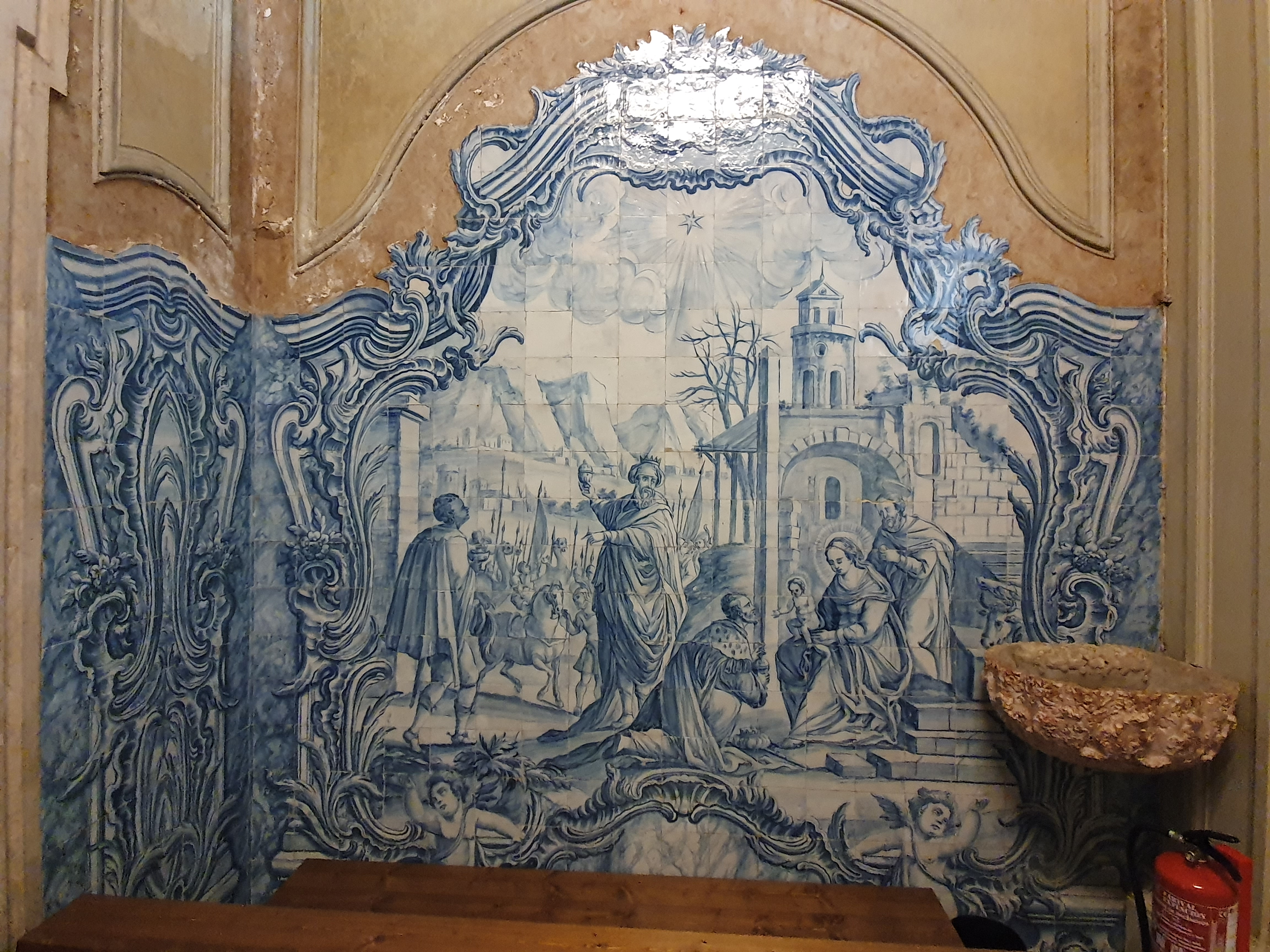
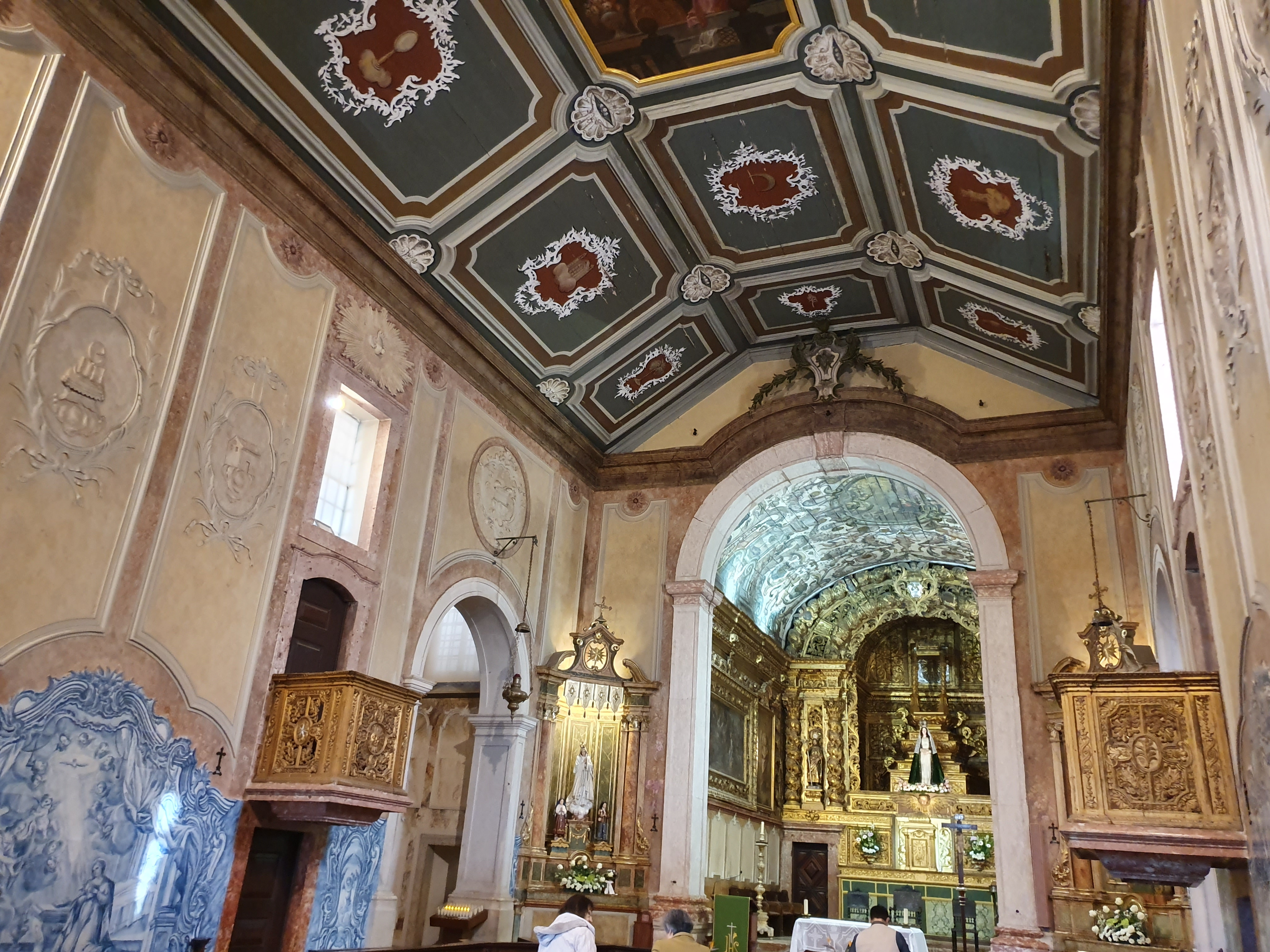
- Clockwise: Campo das Amoreiras; Ameixoeira metro station; Igreja de Charneca; Igreja de Nossa Senhora da Encarnação Ameixoeira; Azulejos in Santa Clara; Igreja de Santana

- Coordinates: 38.785°N 9.143°W
- Country: Portugal
- Region: Lisbon
- Metropolitan area: Lisbon
- District: Lisbon
- Municipality: Lisbon

Area
  - Total: 3.36 km^{2} (1.30 sq mi)

Population (2021)
  - Total: 23,645
  - Density: 7,040/km^{2} (18,200/sq mi)
- Time zone: UTC+00:00 (WET)
  - Summer (DST): UTC+01:00 (WEST)
- Website: https://www.jf-santaclara.pt/

Santa Clara (Portuguese pronunciation: [ˈsɐ̃tɐ ˈklaɾɐ]) is a freguesia (civil parish) and typical quarter of Lisbon, the capital city of Portugal. Located in northern Lisbon, Santa Clara is north of Lumiar, west of Olivais, and directly south of Lisbon's border with Odivelas and Loures. The population in 2021 was 23,645.

== History ==
=== Antiquity (up to 711 CE) ===
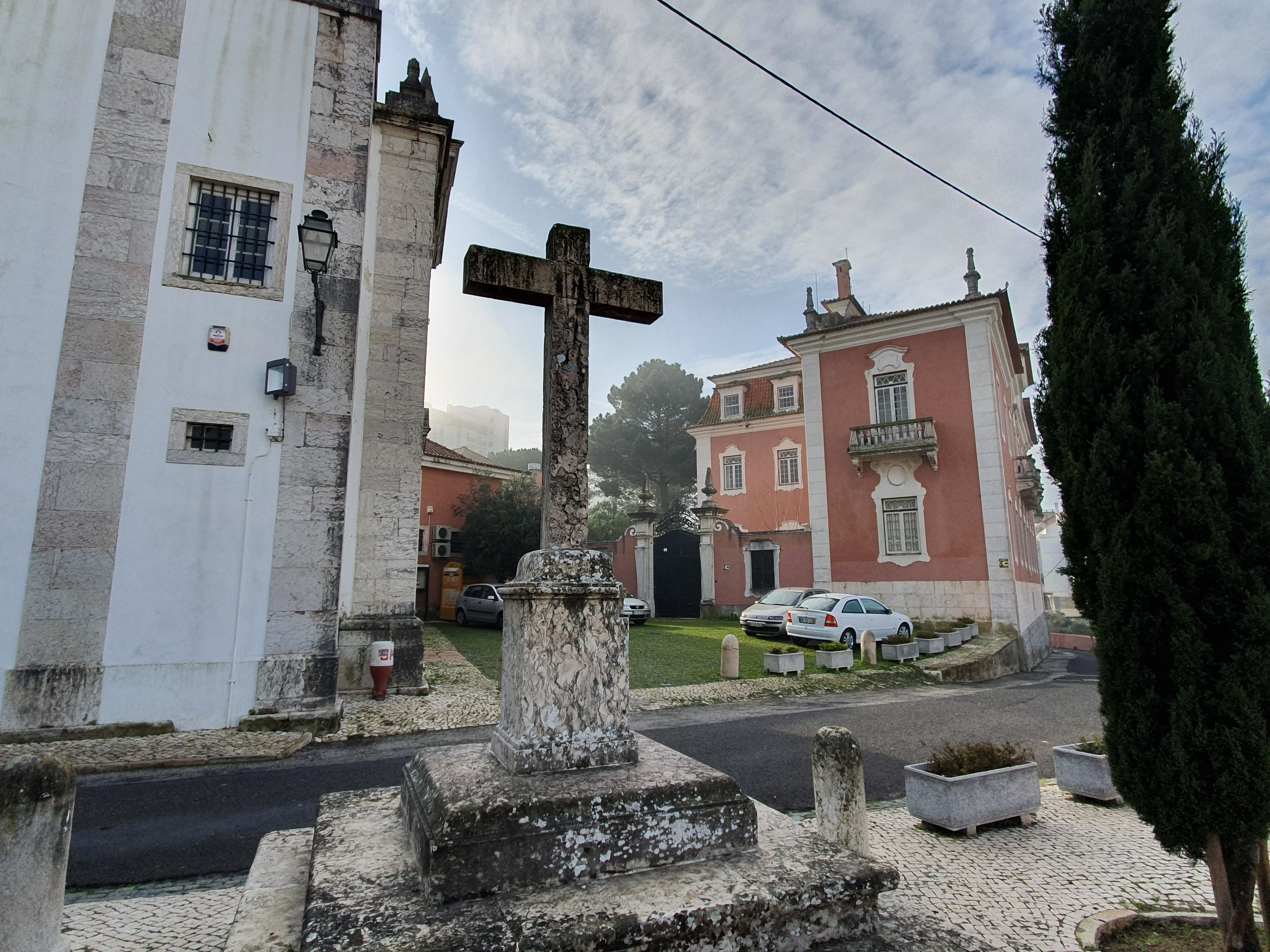
Cruzeiro in Santa Clara

Since prehistoric times, the territory now known as Santa Clara parish has been inhabited by humans, leaving behind a trail of archaeological evidence dating from the Paleolithic to the Chalcolithic era. It is even suggested that the Ameixoeira Fort stands on the remains of a Chalcolithic settlement, and Celtic tombs were discovered in the vicinity.

Furthermore, Roman influence is substantiated by the discovery of an altar or stele, with a likely 3rd-century inscription, unearthed in 1720 in the Várzea de Santa Suzana.

=== Muslim rule (711 CE – 1147 CE) ===
During the Muslim rule of the Iberian Peninsula between the 8th and 12th centuries, the occupation intensified with the consolidation of small homesteads and the development of orchards and gardens.

From the Muslim period, some remnants endure, such as the covas (caves), underground granaries or silos, along with various legendary reminiscences. These include the tale of the Moorish figure Mixo or Amixo founding the settlement, and the account of the battle fought between Moors and Christians. Additionally, there is the story of how the Christians discovered the image of Our Lady concealed in a hidden nook.

At the time of the conquest of Lisbon, the number of local residents was already significant, and they were joined by many Moors who were either expelled from the city or left voluntarily. Christians and Muslims eventually merged in a short time, erasing religious and cultural differences.

=== Kingdom of Portugal and incorporation into Lisbon (1147 – 1885) ===
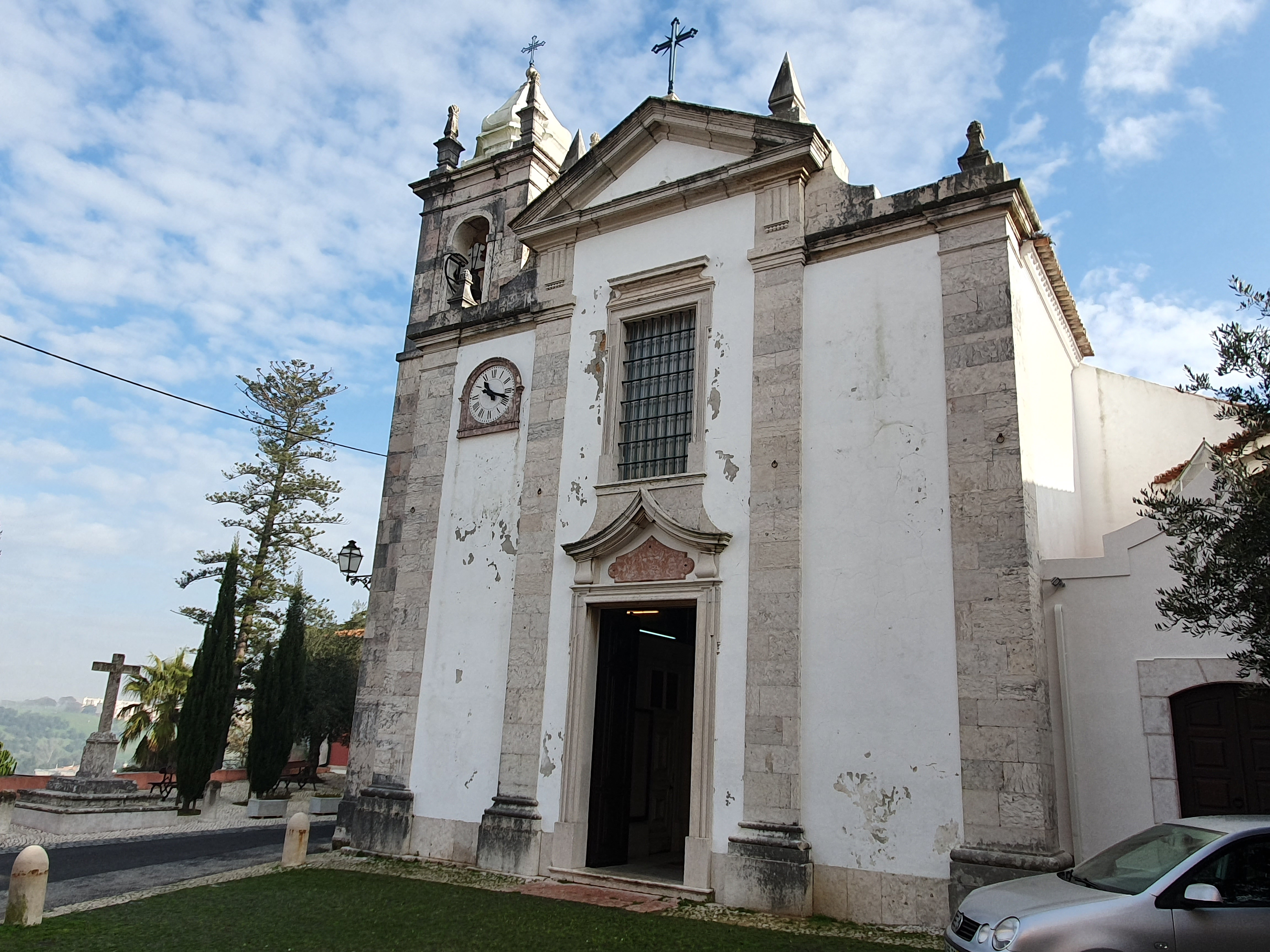
Nossa Senhora da Encarnação church

On July 24, 1385, D. João I granted perpetual rights and inheritance of vineyards and their accompanying lands, located beyond the boundaries of Lisbon, to "Afom priz da charneca caualeiro nosso uasallo" (transl. Afonso Pires da Charneca, knight, our vassal). These vineyards were specifically situated "aallem d aRoyos caminho da charneca" (transl. beyond Arroios, way to Charneca) and they were known to be associated with Lisbon city's vineyard.

During the 15th century, Santa Clara (Ameixoeira) gained some prominence and housed a hospice for the destitute and pilgrims. On June 22, 1476, following a prolonged dispute with the University of Lisbon, the parish of Charneca de Sacavém was officially delimited for the first time, thereby ending its annexation to that parish. In 1514 the Quinta of Our Lady of Carmo was built.

As the 16th century began, Ameixoeira sought to become an independent parish, separating from Lumiar, with which it had been affiliated since 1266. This process was eventually completed on October 16, 1541, with the establishment of the parish, dedicated to Our Lady of the Incarnation. Notably, the oldest parish registry in the municipality of Lisbon dates back to 1540, a time when the parish was not fully disentangled from Lumiar.

In 1585 the parish of Charneca do Lumiar was created; it would later (2012) merge with Ameixoeira originating today's Santa Clara.

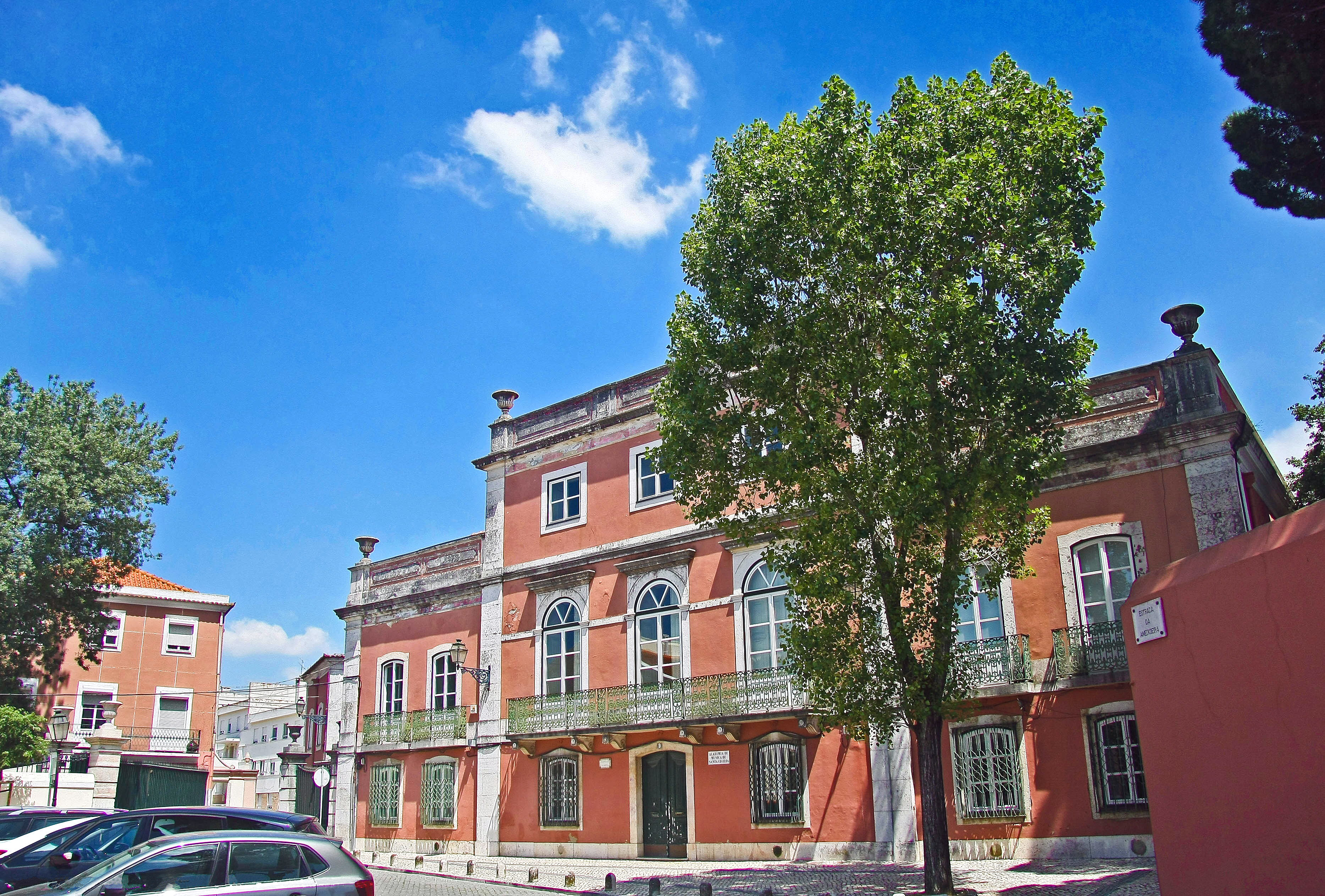
Santa Cecília Music Academy

In 1660, the Fountain of Torrinha, along with its water source, was constructed. From 1664 to 1681, significant renovations were undertaken in the church, including the addition of the chancel, and the ceiling panels were adorned with paintings by Bento Coelho da Silveira. In 1688, while serving as the judge of the Confraternity of Our Lady of the Incarnation of Ameixoeira, the magistrate Gonçalo Mendes de Brito financed the installation of tiles in the nave, and he personally funded the construction of the main altarpiece. The 16th century saw also the establishment of Igreja de São Bartolomeu (Saint Bartholomew church).

The devastating earthquake of 1755 wrought substantial destruction, affecting both the church and the residential and agricultural properties in the parish.

Throughout the 19th century, Ameixoeira seems to have been a favored locale for duels of honor among the citizens of Lisbon, and it also saw the construction of the Ameixoeira Fort.

In 1852, the parishes of Charneca and Ameixoeira were incorporated into the newly established municipality of Olivais. Thirty-three years later, in 1885, it once again became part of the municipality of Lisbon. Under the old administrative division, it was part of the province of Estremadura.

=== Urbanization and new boundaries (1885–2012) ===
The majority of the several zones in which the parish (freguesia) is divided, namely Quinta da Torrinha, Desvío, Galinheiras, Alto do chapeleiro, Quinta das lavadeiras, Quinta das Mouriscas and the new zones Alta de Lisboa and Quinta do Grafanil date from the second half of the 20th century.

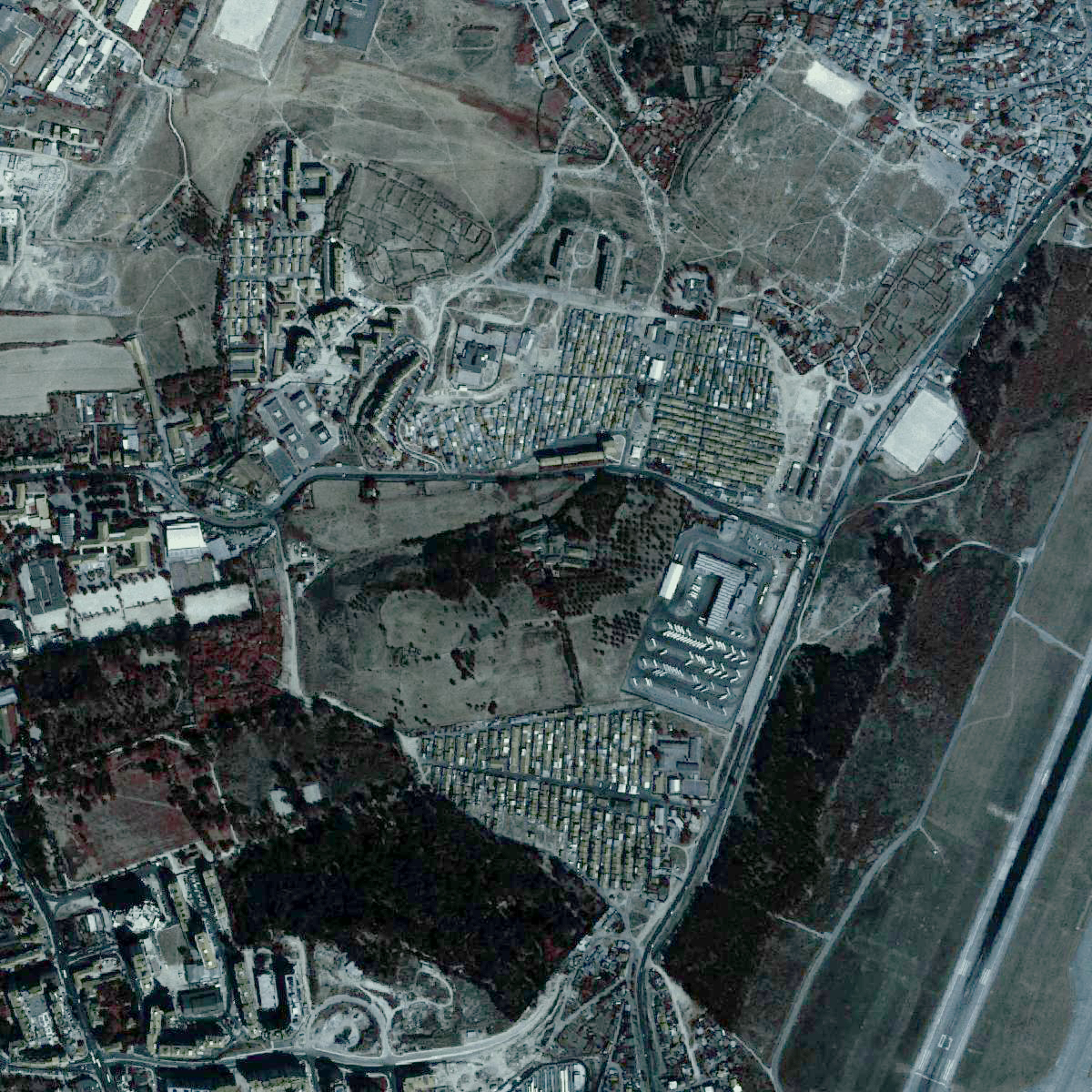
Aerial orthography from 1995 centered on Quinta da Musgueira, showing the extent of the Musgueira North and South neighborhoods

In the 20th century, Ameixoeira parish faced a period of decline, with its historic infrastructure deteriorating. To address this, social housing projects were established to relocate residents from nearby shantytowns, including Charneca, Cruz Vermelha, Vale do Forno, Odivelas, Quinta do Louro, Musgueira Sul, Musgueira Norte and Galinheiras. These initiatives, centered in the Galinheiras area, also included subsidized housing for young people. New developments like Alta de Lisboa transformed the traditionally rural and peaceful character of the parish, leading to it being considered a problematic area. It was even part of the European LUDA project, which aimed to identify and solve challenges in distressed urban areas.

On the other hand, before the 1959 administrative reform of Lisbon, the Charneca parish covered a larger area, extending south and east. However, after the reform, the eastern region was reassigned to the Santa Maria dos Olivais parish due to its integration into the Lisbon Airport expansion, while the southern area was divided among the Lumiar parish and the newly created Alvalade and São João de Brito parishes. The territory of the parish is adjacent to one of the runways of Lisbon Airport.

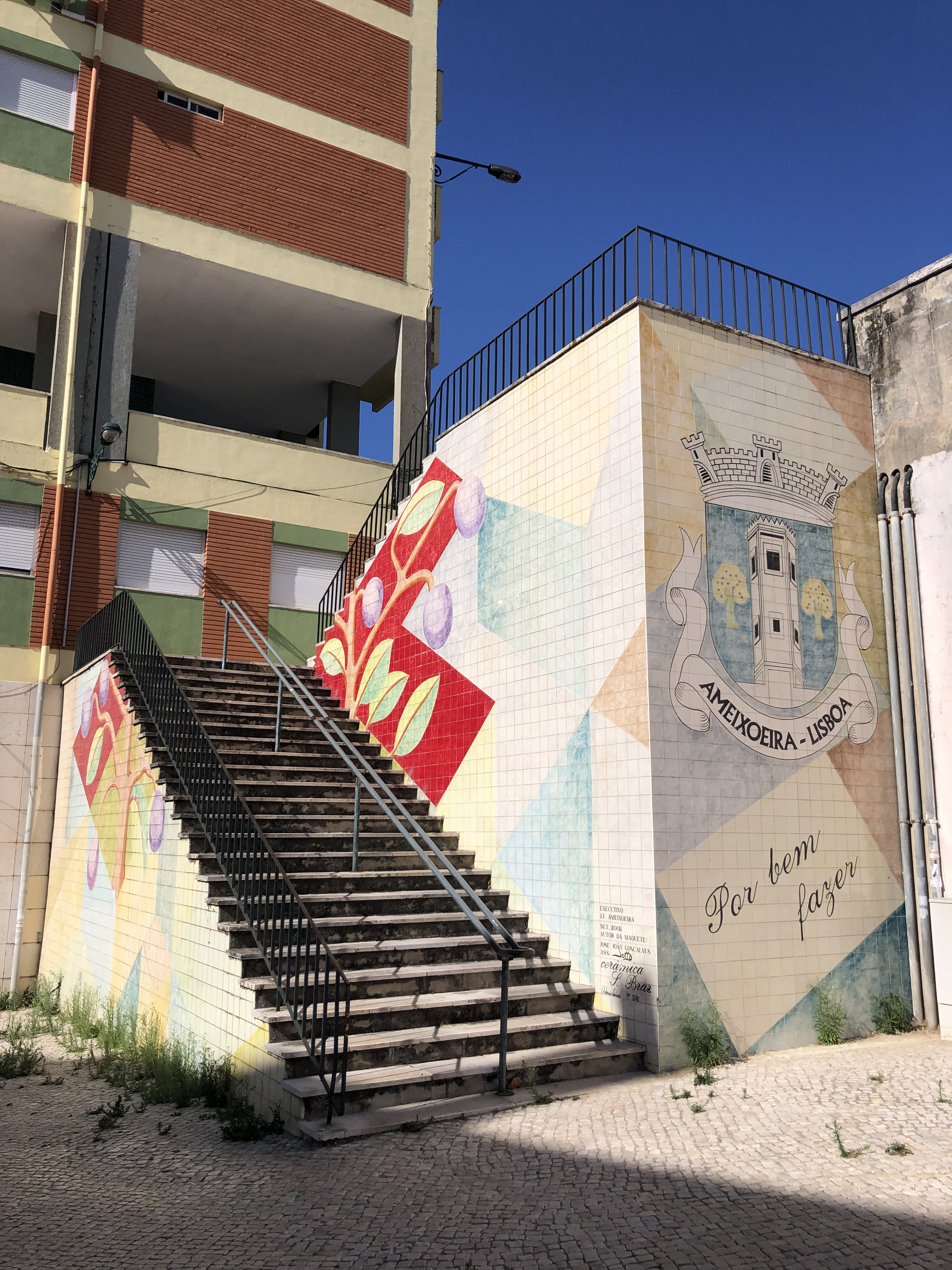
Modern azulejos in Santa Clara

Since the 1960s, the territory of the parish is crossed by the A1 highway and in 1978 the first campus of Instituto Superior de Gestão (ISG) was inaugurated in the former parish of Ameixoeira (now part of Santa Clara).

In 1993 the Portuguese gothic metal band Moonspell – formed in 1992 – performed their first show in the said parish. They quickly became the most recognizable metal band from Portugal and a key figure in gothic metal.

In 1993 a major program for the eradication of shantytowns – which had remarkably grown following the influx of refugees from African colonies in the late 1970s and early 1980s, began. This program was called Programa Especial de Realojamento (PER; or, in English, Special Rehousing Program) aimed to relocate residents of slums in the 28 municipalities of the metropolitan areas of Lisbon and Porto, being the largest public housing promotion program in Portugal since the 25th of April. The relocation program was highly beneficial for Lisbon: in 1993 there were still 37,300 people living in shantytowns in the capital city alone and around 130,000 the whole country (1.3% of the population). Santa Clara was amongst the v more affected by the PER program and, by 2007, thousands of people who previously lived in precarious dwellings had been relocated to more suitable ones. In particular, in Santa Clara parish alone, around 8,415 people now live in a house built during the PER years, or around 35.6% of the population.

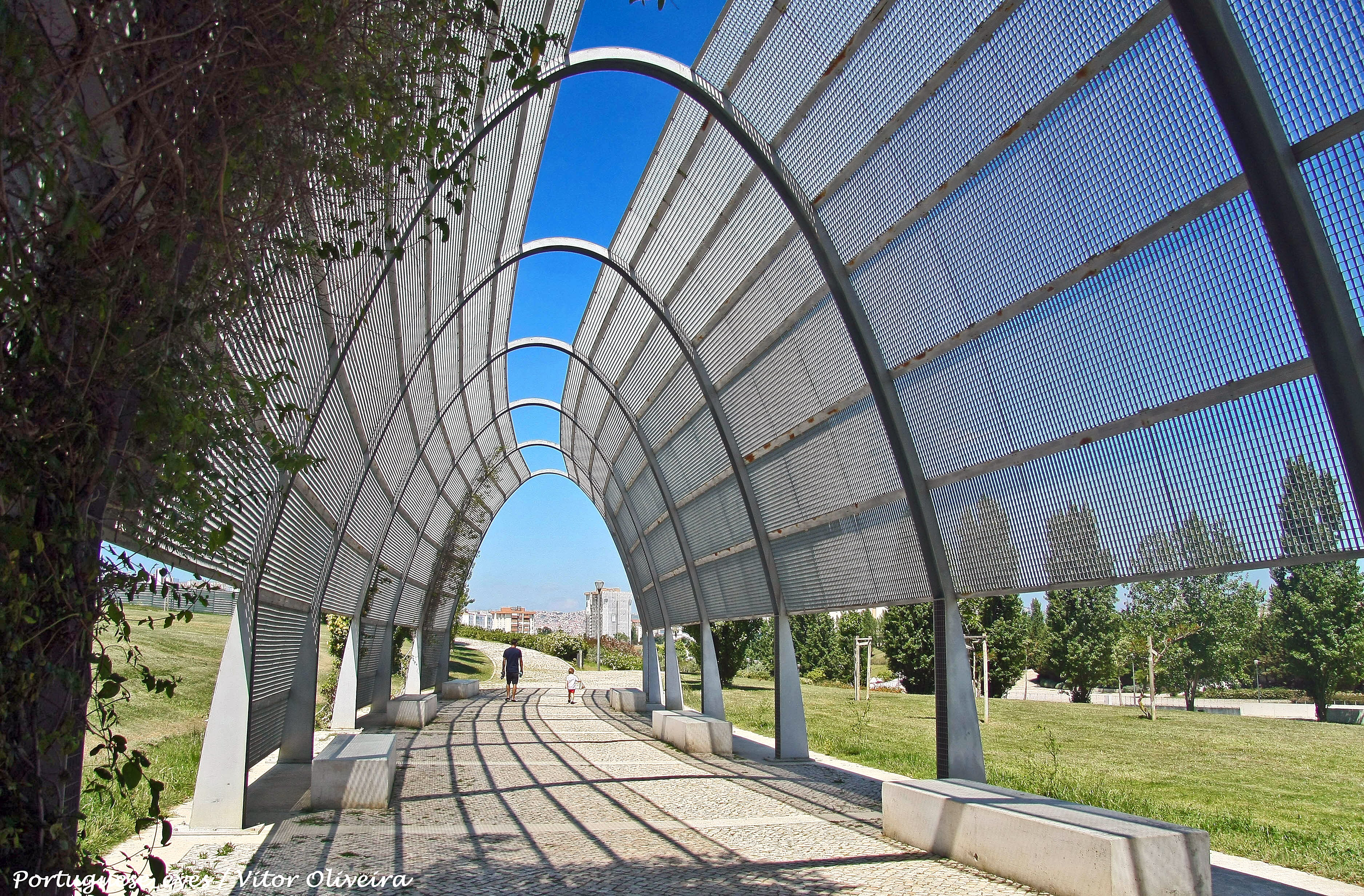
Park in Santa Clara

In 1997 the Alta de Lisboa Centro neighbourhood was built. Housing around 5,300 people in 84 buildings and almost 2,000 apartments, it is one of the largest public housing projects ever built in Portugal. It was built where three large slums – namely Musgueira Norte, Musgueira Sul and Quinta Grande – existed. In the same year, the 1st edition of the work Ameixoeira, Um Núcleo Histórico (monograph and other articles) was published: a detailed and rigorous monograph of the parish by Eugénio do Espírito Santo, which awaits its 2nd edition, and which can be consulted in the Municipal Libraries and in the Parish of Ameixoeira.

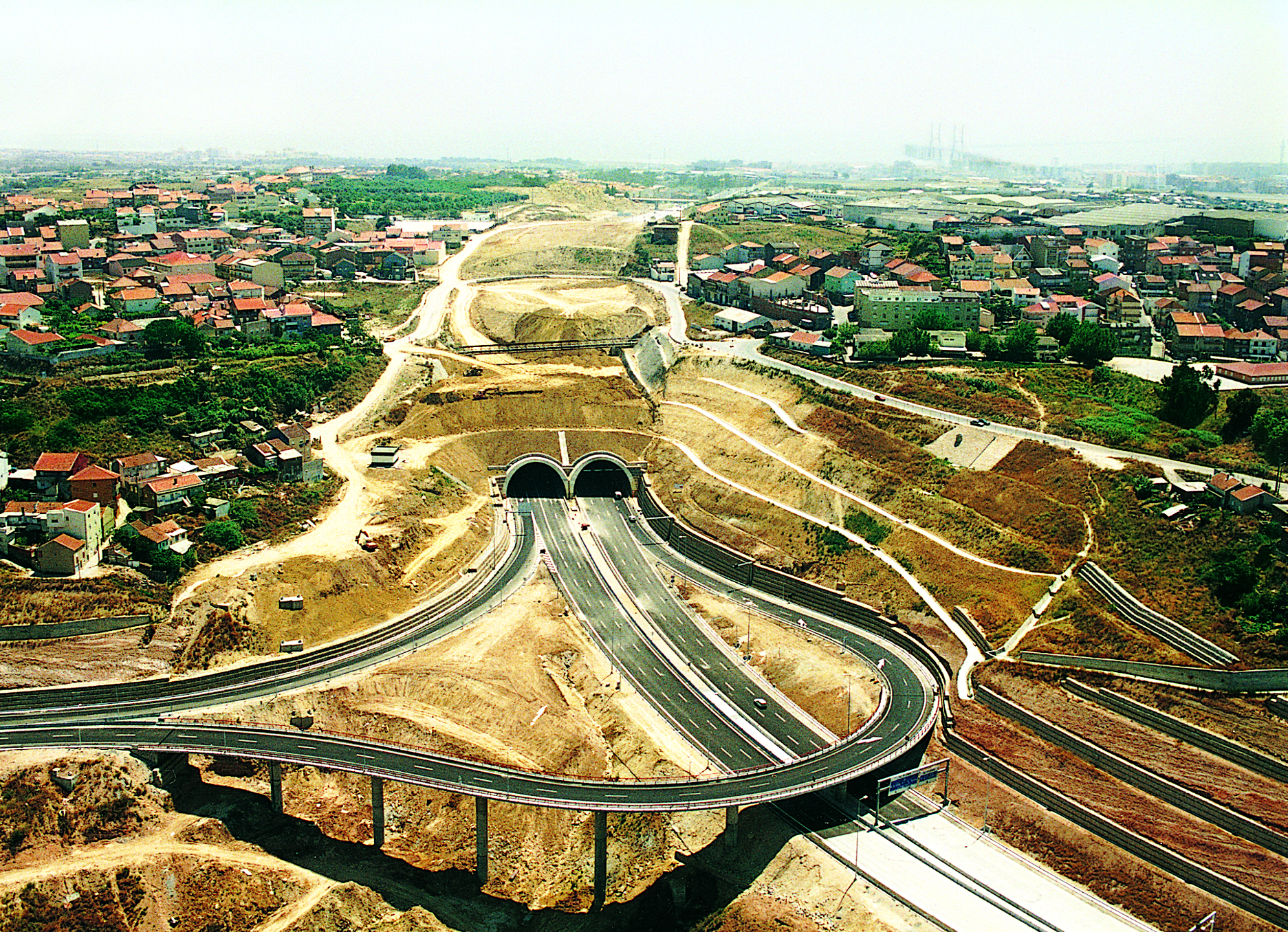
Túnel do Grilo in 1998

In 1998 the Túnel do Grilo was opened.

In 2003 the neighbourhoods of Alto do Chapeleiro, Quinta das lavandeiras and Bairro da Ameixoeira were completed: they currently house more than 3,100 people in 110 buildings and more than 1,000 apartments. They were built where the slums of Galinheiras, Quinta do Louro, Pailepa, Vale do Forno, Calvanas, and Alto dos Moinhos once stood.

In 2006 Parque Oeste, a park with an area of 13 hectares (32 acres), was inaugurated. It has a privileged location in a valley area and performs a fundamental ecological function through a retention basin that allows the use of rainwater to feed water courses, water the large lawns and sustainably maintain all existing vegetation in the area. In the same year, the Ameixoeira Fort – reconstructed in 1950 and serving as a warehouse up to 1989 – was assigned to the Portuguese Intelligence Services.

=== Infrastructure development (2012 – present) ===
The freguesia was created with the 2012 Administrative Reform of Lisbon, merging the former Charneca and Ameixoeira parishes.

In 2017 a new municipal firefighters' command was opened, aiming at serving almost 75,000 inhabitants in northern Lisbon.

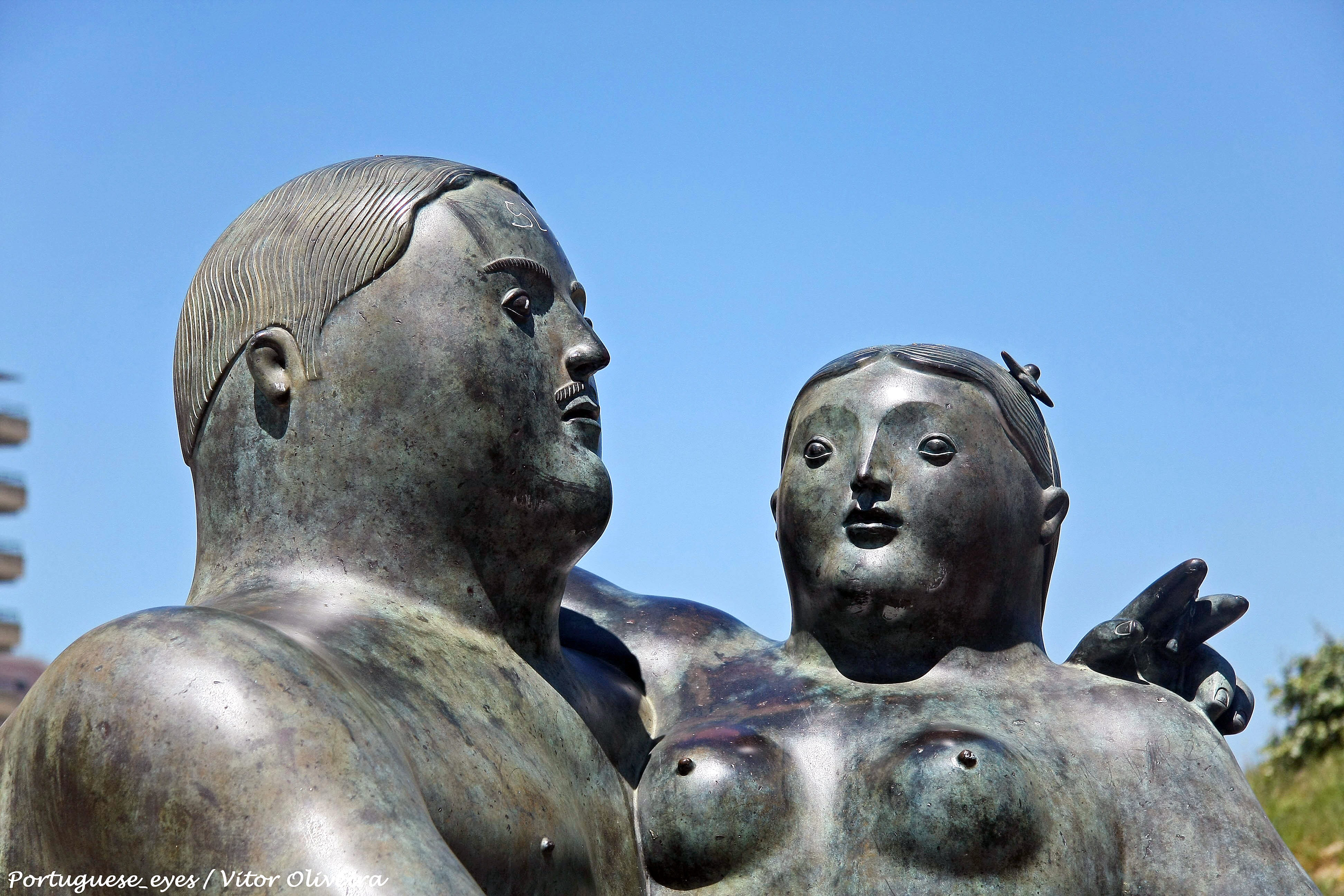
Botero sculpture in Santa Clara

In 2020 Alta retail park – a project for a commercial area worth 35 million € and covering a surface of 22,000 m^{2} (240,000 sq ft) – was inaugurated, contributing to the revitalization of the area. Also in 2020, the residential project Altear was conceived. Works have started and are planned to deliver 120,000 m^{2} (1,300,000 sq ft) divided between more than 500 luxury residential units, commercial areas and offices.

In 2021 the cultural centre Quinta Alegre – Lugar de Cultura was established in the parish. Saint Cecilia music academy (Academia de Música de Santa Cecília) is also located here.

In 2023 a new section of Eixo Central (Central axis) was opened. In January 2023 Lisbon mayor Carlos Moedas announced also the construction of over 2,000 homes for affordable housing in the upcoming years.

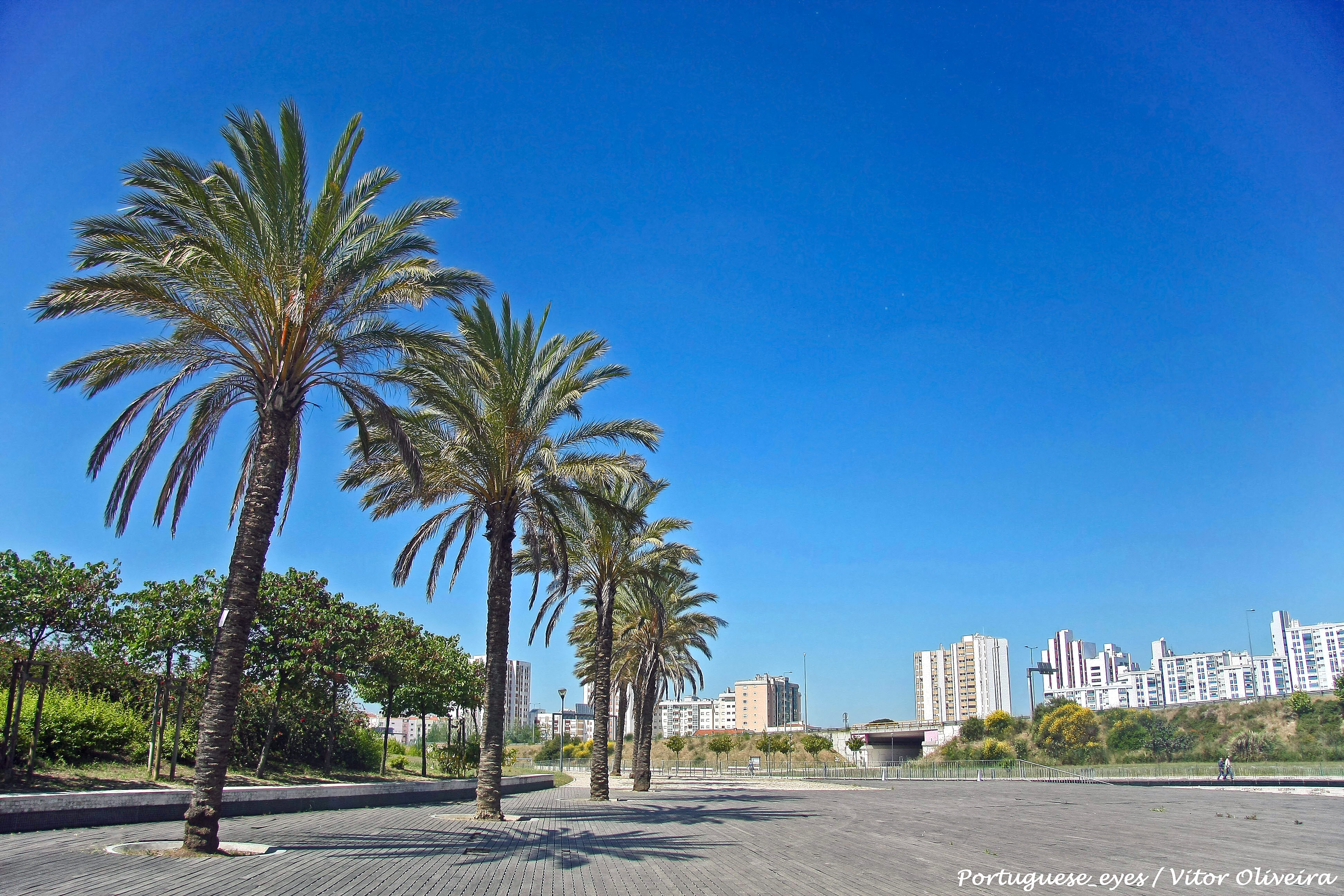
Avenue lined with palm trees in Santa Clara

Santa Clara, once a neglected parish, is also being revitalised due to the contributions of numerous cultural associations located there, including Ameixoeira Community Development Center (Centro de Desenvolvimento Comunitário Ameixoeira), Pedro Arrupe Centre, Sindicato Nacional da Polícia (SINAPOL), Associação Lusofonia Cultura e Cidadania, CulturFACE – Cultural Association for Development and Centro de Desenvolvimento Comunitário da Charneca (CDC Charneca), amongst others. The parish of Ameixoeira was one of the most deprived and critical in the city of Lisbon; its peripheral location contributed to this.

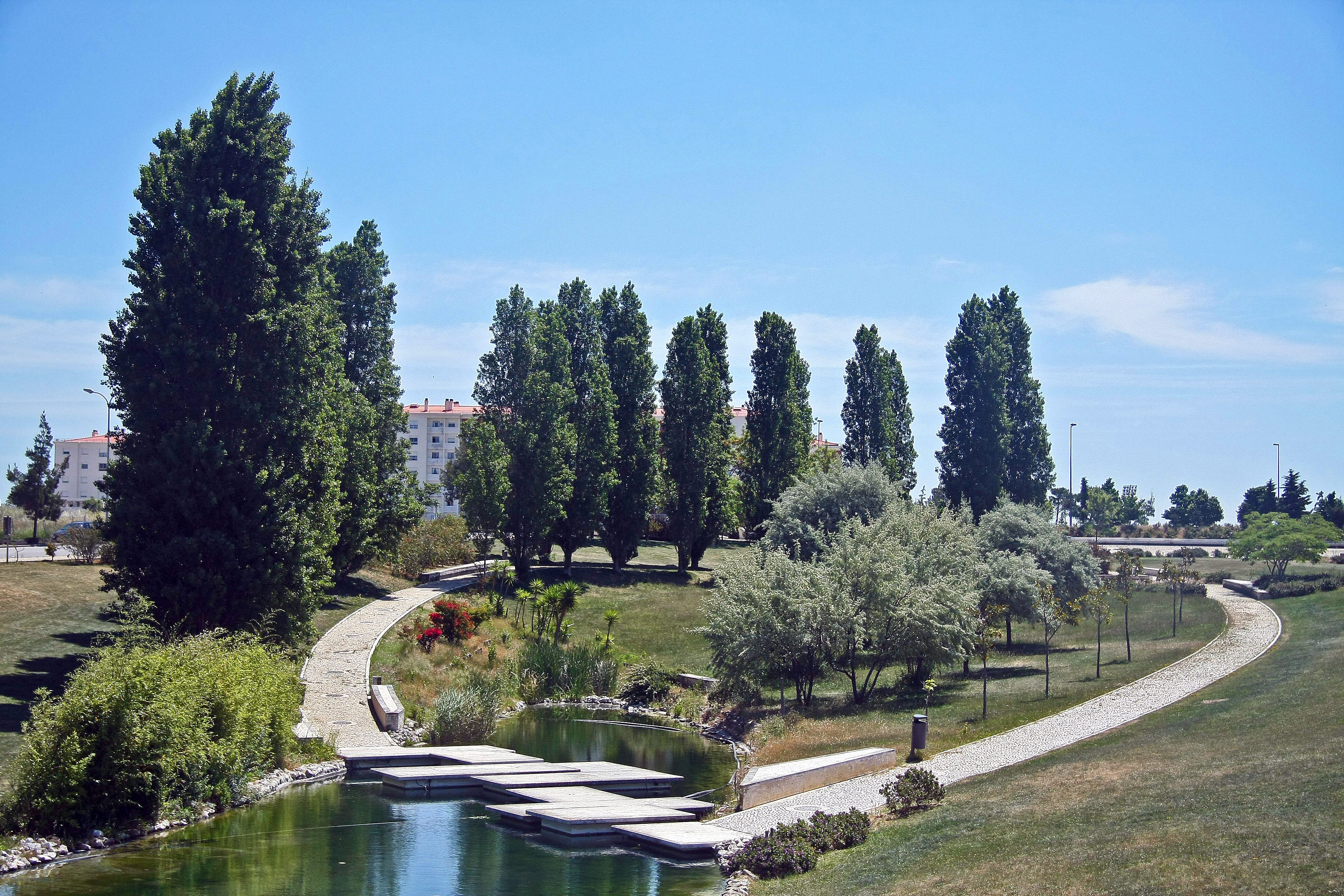
View of south Santa Clara

Over time, several studies, projects and plans have been carried out with a view to minimizing asymmetries between Ameixoeira and other Lisbon parishes, highlighting:

- Parque Periférico
- Coroa Norte
- Plano de Acção Territorial (PAT)
- Large Urban Distressed Áreas (LUDA)
- Plano Regional de Ordenamento do Território da Área Metropolitana de Lisboa (PROTAML)
- Programa Integrado de Qualificação das Áreas Suburbanas da Área Metropolitana de Lisboa (PROQUAL)
- Programa de Recuperação de Áreas Urbanas Degradadas (PRAUD)

== Demographics ==
Historical population
Year	Pop.	±%
1864	990	—
1878	1,100	+11.1%
1890	1,479	+34.5%
1901	1,420	−4.0%
1911	1,782	+25.5%
1920	1,616	−9.3%
1930	4,321	+167.4%
1940	4,510	+4.4%
1950	5,726	+27.0%
1960	5,319	−7.1%
1971	13,911	+161.5%
1981	20,578	+47.9%
1991	20,177	−1.9%
2001	20,153	−0.1%
2011	21,798	+8.2%
Source: INE

=== Historical resident population (before the 2012 Administrative Reform) ===
Santa Clara area before and after the 2012 Portuguese administrative reform

Between 1864 and 1878, Charneca and Ameixoeira belonged to the extinct municipality of Olivais. The limits were set by Law no. 56/2012, of November 8.

In 1890, shortly after Charneca and Ameixoeira were incorporated into Lisbon, the total population stood at 1,479. In 1970, 80 years later, the population had grown to 13,911, recording a 940.6% growth rate.

The two former parishes experienced continued growth from the 1980 Census (when many people coming from the former Portuguese colonies in Africa – the so-called retornados – moved to Portugal) up to 2011.

From 1970 to 2011, the two parishes that now constitute Santa Clara gained 7,887 people, recording a 56.7% growth rate. In the 1980s and 1990s the population of the parish recorded a minor loss; this is probably due to plummeting fertility rates as well as the demolition of shanty towns such as Musgueira.

The 2012 Portuguese administrative reform meant that the population rose further to 22,480 since minor portions of Olivais and Lumiar were incorporated into the newly formed parish.

=== Current resident population (after the 2012 Administrative Reform) ===
In the 2021 Portuguese Census was recorded a sustained demographic growth. In particular, from 2011 to 2021 the parish gained 1,856 people, recording a growth of 8.5%.

Former parishes			Current parish			
Parish	Population (2011)	Area (km^{2})	Parish	Population in 2011	Population in 2021	Area (km^{2})
Charneca	9,935	1.72	Santa Clara	21,798	23,645	3.36
Ameixoeira	11,863	1.61	Santa Clara	21,798	23,645	3.36

=== Demographic statistics ===
- Age

The last censuses show that the parish's population is ageing at a rapid pace: in 2021, 31.06% of the population was below 25 and, at the same time, almost a fifth (16.37%) of the residents was 65 or older.

Distribution of population by age groups
Year	0–14 years	0–14 years %	15–24 years	15–24 years %	25–64 years	25–64 years %	> 65 years	> 65 years %
2021	4,462	18.87%	2,882	12.19%	12,430	52.57%	3,871	16.37%

- Religion
Religion in Santa Clara (Census 2021)
1. Catholicism (68.6%)
2. Protestantism (6.02%)
3. Jehovah's Witnesses and Other Christian (2.68%)
4. Orthodoxy (0.86%)
5. Islam (1.15%)
6. Hinduism (0.21%)
7. Buddhism (0.19%)
8. Judaism (0.02%)
9. Other religions (0.68%)
10. No religion (19.6%)

The parish is predominantly Catholic and 78.13% of the population aged 15 or above are followers of a Christian or Jehovah's Witness denomination as of 2021.

Around 19.63% of the population does not practice a religion and is thus non-religious.

The presence of minor religions such as Islam, Hinduism and Buddhism (2.24% of the population amongst the three) is probably due to an increasing community of people coming from India, Pakistan, Bangladesh or Nepal.

- Immigration

In 2021, 8.65% of the population of the parish was constituted by foreigners. In particular, amongst women, foreigners were 9.01% of the total. This means that in Santa Clara there are 2,045 resident foreigners, an increase from 2011, when there were 1,845 resident foreigners (8.21%). Since the foreign population increased by 200 people from 2011 to 2021 (correcting by new territorial area), and given that the total population of the parish increased by 1,165 units in the same timespan, more than half the total population growth was due to the increase in the number of resident foreigners, thus not counting people who have acquired Portuguese nationality in the meantime. The largest group of foreigners is constituted by citizens of Lusophone African countries (883 people or -20.1% since 2011), Brazilians (573 people or +85.44% since 2011), and people from the Indian subcontinent, most notably Nepalis and Bangladeshis, totaling 92 people, or recording an increase of 104.44% since 2011.

Considering the foreign-born population, 15.27% of the parish's population was born abroad as of 2021. The most common countries of birth were Lusophone African countries (2,274 people), Brazil (768 people) and the Indian subcontinent (122 people). 2.74% of the parish's population were first-generation immigrants from the island country of São Tomé e Príncipe. Of the Portuguese nationals born abroad, the most common countries of birth were Lusophone African countries (1,515 people) and Brazil (224 people), all countries having ancient historical ties with Portugal as well as a rooted migration history towards the country, and who are, thus, more likely to have acquired Portuguese citizenship over the years.

Moreover, as of 2021 in the parish there were 2,273 people who have entered Portugal after 2010, constituting 9.61% of the population. Of those with recent migrant background, 13.77% were Portuguese nationals returning from a period of emigration abroad.

Amongst the Portuguese, 3,753 had already lived abroad as of 2021 (17.38% of the Portuguese population). A plurality of those having lived in Angola and Mozambique (1,086 people) entered Portugal in the 1970s (525 people or 48.34%), following the independence of the two former colonies (so-called retornados). Those coming from countries hosting large Portuguese emigrant communities such as France, Spain, Germany, Switzerland, Luxembourg or Belgium (579 people) have mostly entered Portugal after 1991 (74.27%), probably due to the development of the Portuguese economy since its accession to the EU. Interestingly, 52.58% of the Portuguese nationals having lived in the UK and residing in the parish, has left the UK after 2016, (date of the Brexit referendum).

If the whole population (regardless of the nationality held) is taken into account, then 21.52% of the parish's population has already lived abroad for at least one year as of 2021, with Lusophone African countries, Brazil and EU countries being the most commonly cited countries of previous residence.

== Economy and social conditions ==
=== Employment ===
In the parish of Santa Clara there are 1,382 residents who, as of 2021, were unemployed. Of these, 49.20% received a state-funded subsidy or pension (41.34% in Lisbon). In 2021 the unemployment rate in the parish was considerably higher than those of Lisbon and Portugal as a whole, standing at 13.08%. In the same year, Portugal as a whole had an unemployment rate of 8.13% that has progressively decreased to 6.1% in 2023. As the statistics dealing with unemployment at the parish level are available only every 10 years, the current (2023) unemployment rate in Santa Clara is unknown. Amongst youth aged 15–24, the unemployment rate in 2021 in the parish stood at 30.77%, 64.72% higher than in the rest of the country.

On the other hand, in 2021 9,182 residents were employed, of which 78.39% were employees and 18.82% were independent workers. Below is the table showing the employment rate per age group. The low share of people aged 20–24 employed is due to the fact that many are still in education (e.g. university) while the low proportion of those in employment aged 60–64 is due to many being early pensioners.

2021 Census data	Age group								
2021 Census data	20–24	25–29	30–34	35–39	40–44	45–49	50–54	55–59	60–64
Share of people in employment	36.02%	62.11%	66.54%	72.22%	75.47%	74.03%	68.14%	62.97%	47.10%

The residents of Santa Clara spent 26.34 minutes of daily commuting, 4 minutes more than the average inhabitant of Lisbon.

=== Social conditions ===
Regarding overcrowding in the parish's households, 19.99% of the population lives in accommodations where they have less than 15 m^{2} per capita (8.71% for Lisbon and 5.65% in Portugal as a whole), while 26.50% live in houses with more than 40 m^{2} per capita (39.64% for Lisbon and 46.84% in Portugal as a whole). There are 3,253.3 dwellings per km^{2} (3,200.5 for Lisbon and 64.9 in Portugal as a whole).

41.8% of the population lives in owned dwellings as of 2021; this is significantly lower than the values recorded both for Lisbon (50.3%) and for Portugal (70%). The average height of a residential building in Santa Clara is 3.2 floors as of 2021 and the average area of a dwelling stands at 83.38 m^{2} (with the average in Lisbon City being 93.07 m^{2} and in Portugal 112.45 m^{2}).

The average monthly rent value of leased dwellings recorded in 2021 stood at €242.04, 48.60% lower than the Lisbon average in the same year (€470.87). However, the value of the rents is quite low due to contract stipulations from previous decades. 48.93% (25.34% in Lisbon) of the dwellers pay less than €150/month due to the rent-freeze system adopted in Portugal in the late 20th century, leading many people, now mostly senior citizens, to have lower rental costs. Due to the housing crisis and inflation, in 2023 the average rent for new contracts (not taking into account frozen contracts) stood at almost €10/m^{2} in Santa Clara, meaning that the average 83.38 m^{2} dwelling costs around €834/month.

The median price per m^{2} stood at €1,518 for a house sold in early 2016; values had risen to €2,097/m^{2} by early 2021 and to €2,597/m^{2} by 2023, a growth of 71.08% in just seven years. Over the same period, the growth of house prices per m^{2} in Lisbon as a whole was up 117.6% from €1,875/m^{2} to €4,080/m^{2}.

Of the 1,675 residential buildings listed in the parish, 3.28% were built before 1919, 24.24% from 1919 to 1960, 40.42% from 1961 to 1990, 11.88% from 1991 to 2000 and 20.18% after 2001. Of the buildings built before 1919, 96.36% had one to three floors, while in buildings built between 1981 and 2010, the proportion of buildings with six stories or more is 27.40%. The newer and higher the building, the higher the probability of it being served by an elevator. For homes built before 1946, 0% have access to an elevator as of 2021; this percentage climbs to 35.59% for buildings dating from 1981 to 2010. Regarding amenities, 11.05% of the houses had access to air conditioning (20.98% in Lisbon), 51.27% to heating (69.62% in Lisbon) and 39.97% to a parking place (28.04% in Lisbon).

As of 2021 there were 992 vacant dwellings in the parish. Of the vacant dwellings, 537 are vacant for rental or with the purpose of being sold, while 455 are vacant for other reasons, often abandoned, awaiting their demolition or because a reason for conflict among heirs. Moreover, as of 2023 22 apartments are registered as Alojamento Local, meaning they have the license to be rented out on platforms such as Booking.com or Airbnb.

In the parish there were no records of homeless people. The parish nonetheless actively promotes initiatives aiming at helping people in states of permanent or temporary homelessness.

== Landmarks ==
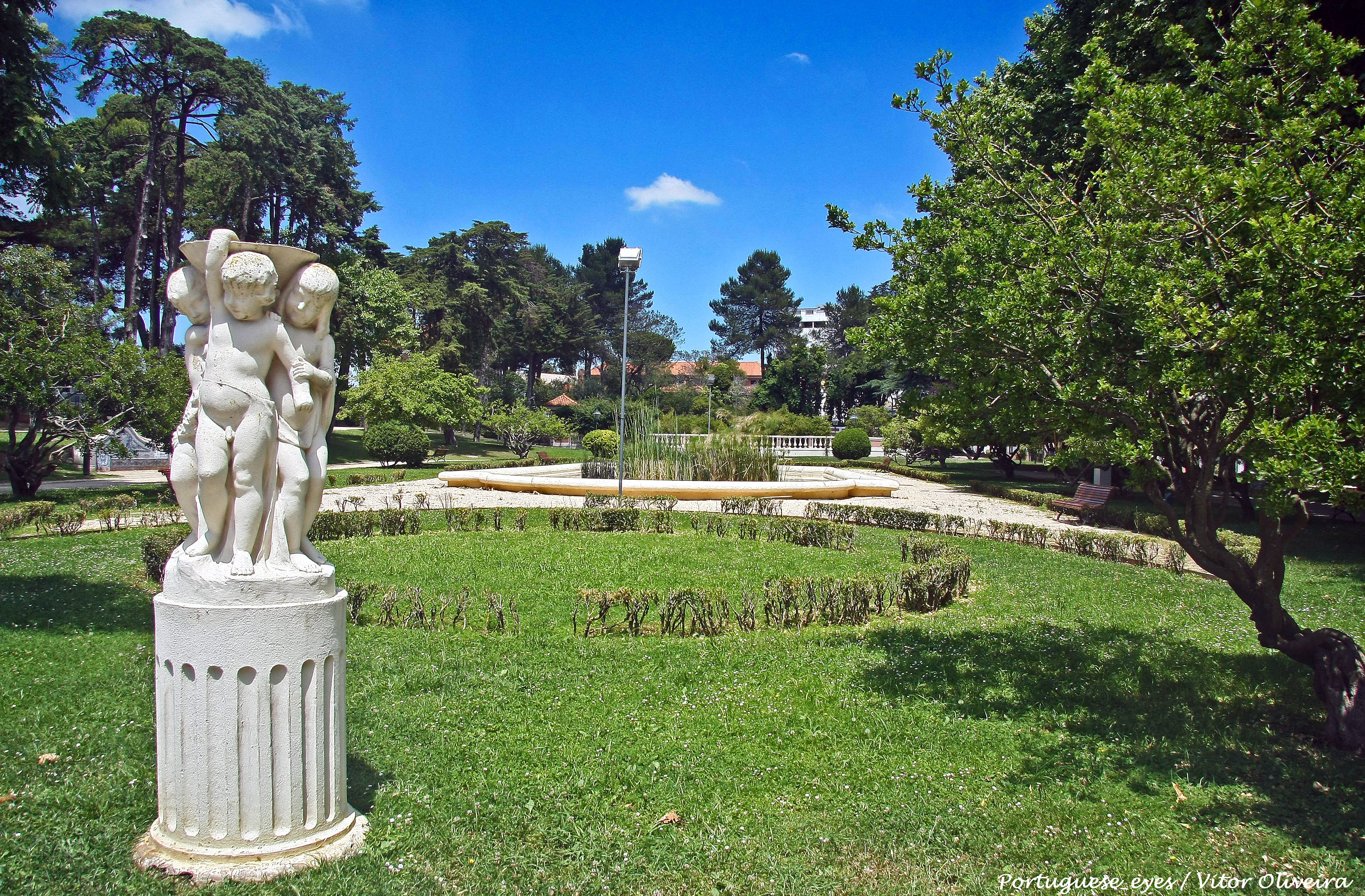
Ameixoeira Garden

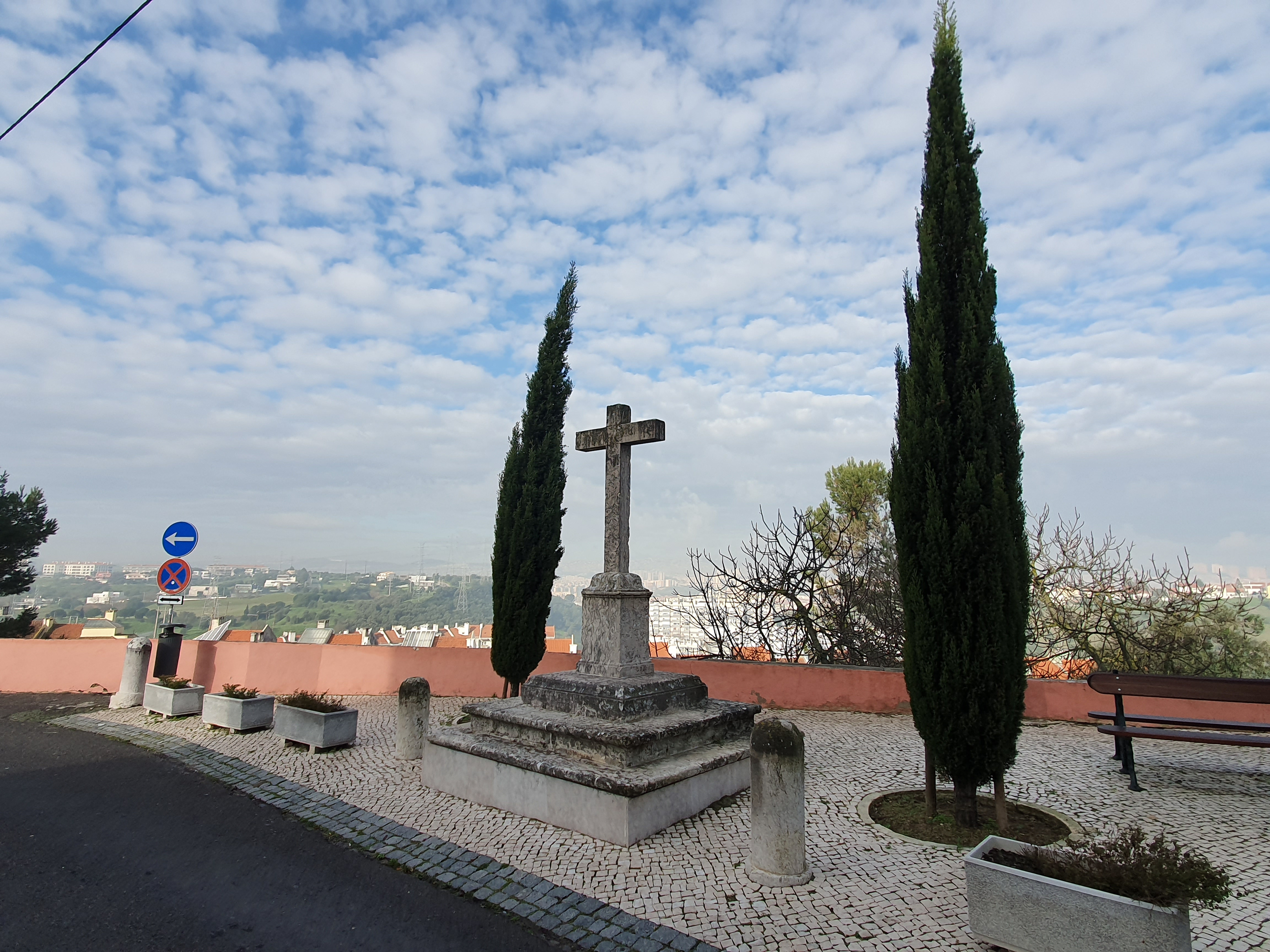
Calvary in Santa Clara

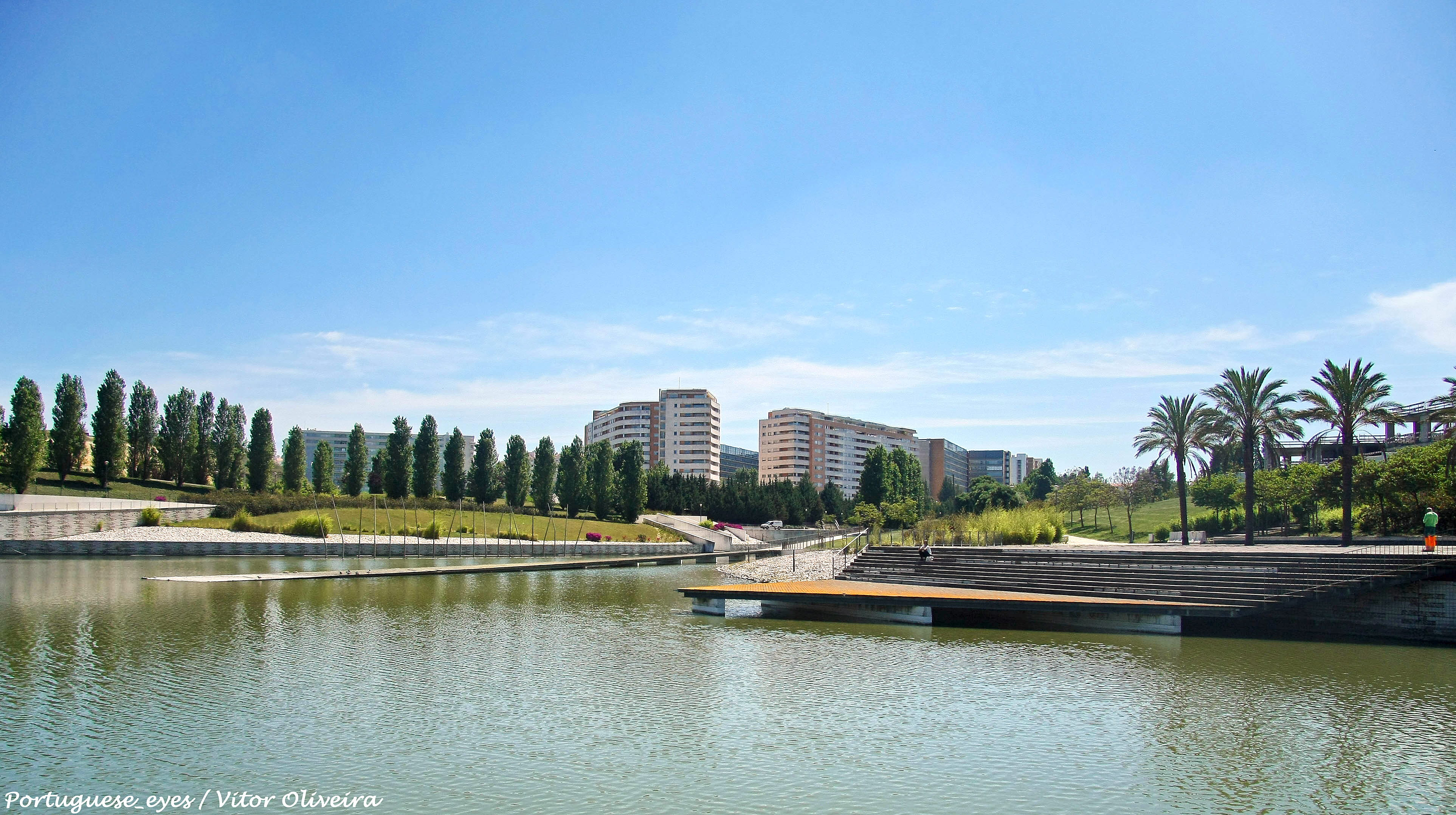
Parque Oeste in Santa Clara

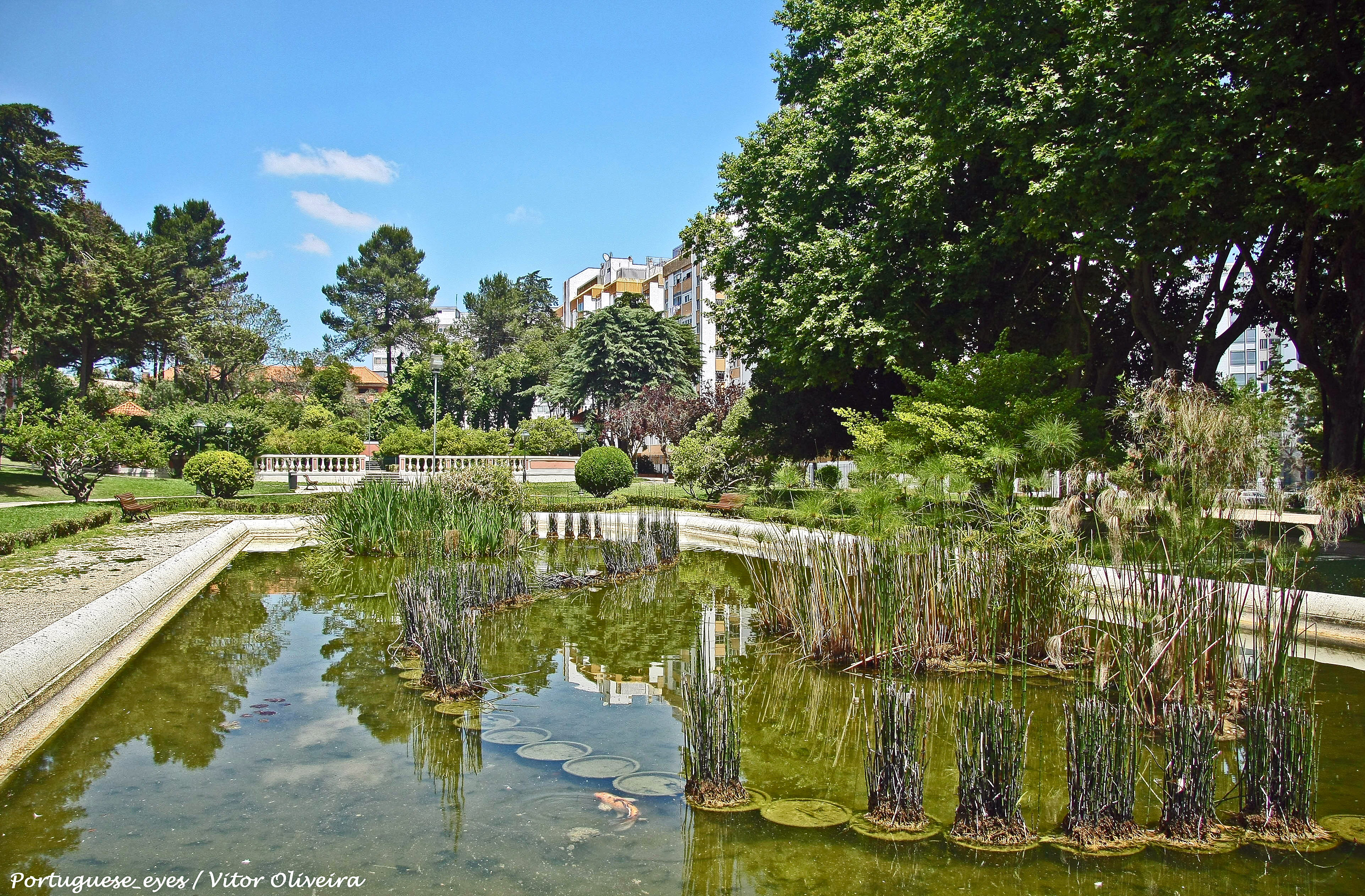
Ameixoeira garden

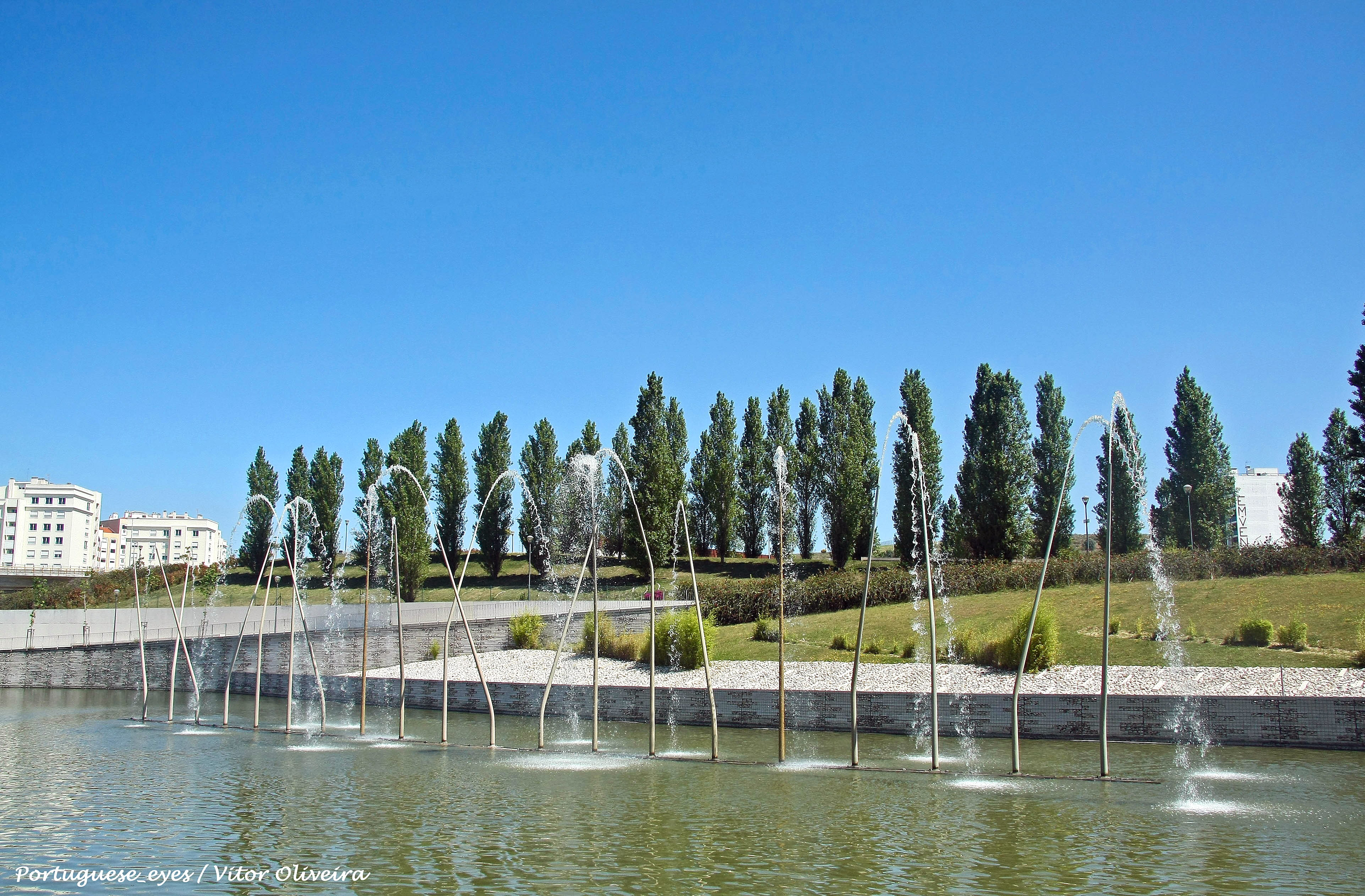
Park

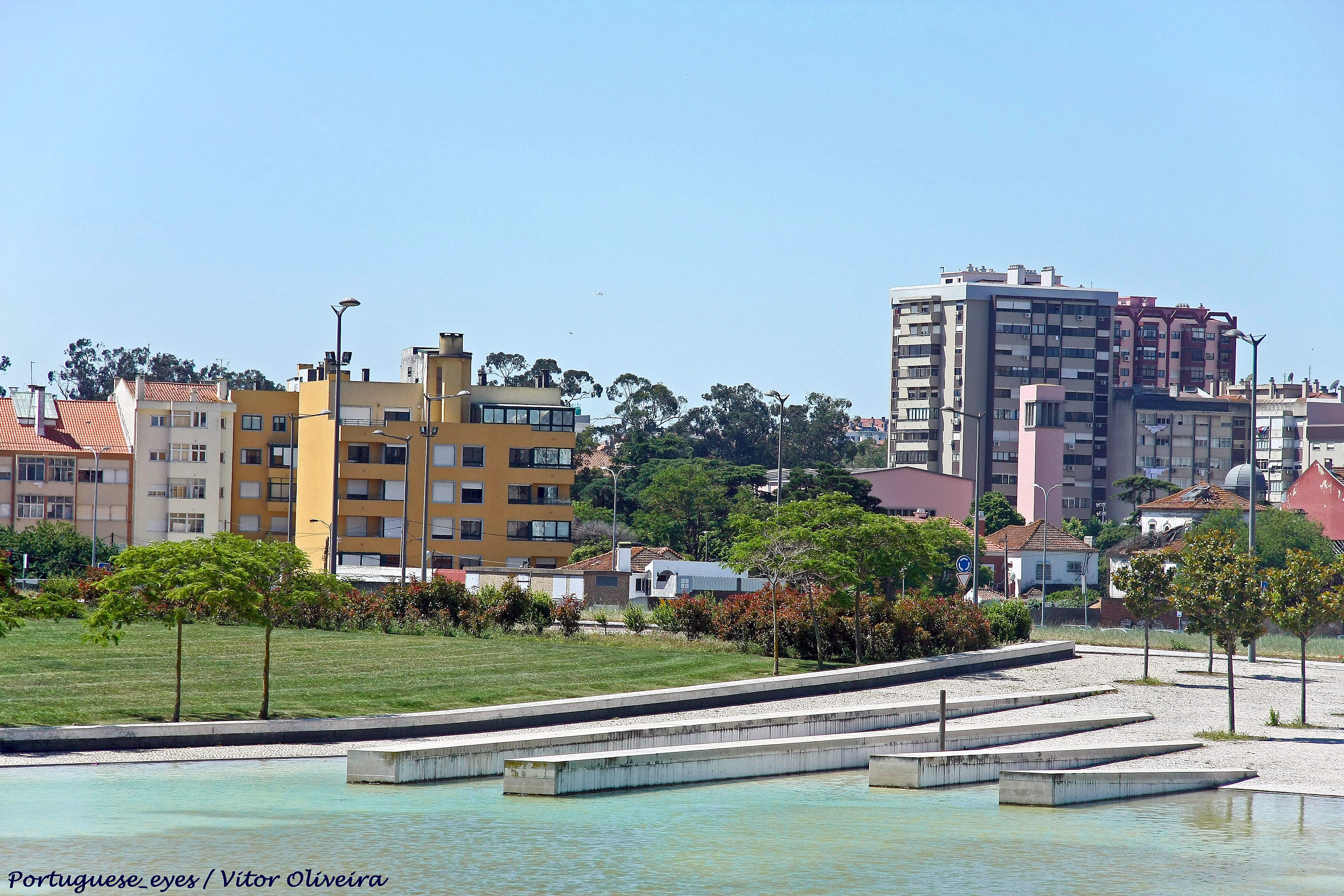
Parque Oeste, Lisbon

- Academia de Música de Santa Cecília, hosted in Palácio da Quinta do Ministro
- Campo das Amoreiras
- Casal da Nossa Senhora da Saúde: Historic house now property of an order of Spanish nuns, changing its name to Cottolengo do Padre Alegre – Casa da Divina Providência
- Fort of Ameixoeira (Forte da Ameixoeira): also known as the King Carlos I Fort, was built in 1901. It currently serves as the headquarters of the Serviço de Informações de Segurança (SIS), the Portuguese Security and Intelligence Service. It was constructed as part of the Campo Entrincheirado (Entrenched Field), a group of fortifications built at the end of the 19th century and beginning of the 20th century to protect Lisbon against possible invasion.
- Igreja de Santana (Santana church)
- Igreja Matriz da Ameixoeira (Ameixoeira church). The church is also known as Igreja de Nossa Senhora da Encarnação (Nossa Senhora da Encarnação church): The construction of this temple, likely preceding 1500, saw significant development from 1536 onward, coinciding with the creation of the parish NS da Encarnação. Construction phases occurred in the 17th century, culminating with the completion of the main chapel in 1685, and in the 18th century following the 1755 earthquake. Classified as a Property of Public Interest, it showcases Portuguese Baroque architecture.
- Igreja de Nossa Senhora de Fátima (Our Lady of Fátima church)
- Igreja de São Bartolomeu da Charneca (Saint Bartholomew church): This 17th-century church, erected in 1685 on the original parish grounds, incorporates elements from the 16th century, such as Manueline fonts, Gothic tombstones, and Mannerist wood paintings. Its facade, with three distinct sections, houses a Baptistery, bell tower, and a central body adorned with exquisite interior decor, including tile panels and canvases.
- Porta gótica da Azinhaga da cidade
- Parte das antigas muralhas da cidade de Lisboa
- Quinta Alegre (or Quinta dos Marqueses de Alegrete): palace, with simple architecture in the late-Baroque style, has a rectangular plan and two floors, with wrought iron balconies on the upper floor. The mansion has stonework corners in the corners and pilasters in the walls. Many tiles placed in the second half of the 18th century stand out in the interior and courtyard. In 1819, when the owner of the farm was José Bento de Araújo, the interior ceilings and walls were decorated with high quality neoclassical paintings. In 1983, the farm was purchased by Santa Casa da Misericórdia de Lisboa and rehabilitated in 2017. Although private, it is now possible for citizens to visit this palace.
- Quinta de Santa Clara
- Quinta Santa Anna
- Quinta Santo André
- Quinta Nossa Senhora do Carmo: Historic building dating from 1514
- Quinta Loureiro
- Quinta Santo António: Historic building adorned with azulejos
- Quinta Catelhana
- Statue by Fernando Botero displayed in Parque Oeste

Due to the fact that the parish is separated from Lisbon airport by Avenida Santos e Castro, the parish is also popular amongst plane spotters.

== Culture ==
The neighbourhood hosts many cultural institutions. Amongst others, there are:

- Centro Social e Paroquial da Ameixoeira
- Cottolengo do Padre Alegre
- Casa da Cultura Cigana
- Centro de Desenvolvimento Comunitário da Ameixoeira K’CIDADE
- Biblioteca Infantil da Ameixoeira

== Sport ==
The neighborhood has many sports facilities, among them the Piscina de Santa Clara (Santa Clara swimming pool), Alto do Lumiar municipal sports complex, Professor Moniz Pereira municipal Athletic track, Polidesportivo das Galinheiras, Polidesportivo Municipal das Torres Edifer as well as other ten municipal sports complexes.

Amongst sports clubs based in the parish one can also find:

- Clube Recr. Ameixoeirense
- Grupo Recr. Inter do Desvio
- Sport União da Torrinha
- Juventude de Atletismo das Galinheiras
- Ameixoeira Futsal Clube
- Piscina Municipal
- Academia de Jiu-Jitsu e Vale Tudo (NARÉ FIGHTERS)

== Gardens and parks ==
Santa Clara hosts several public gardens, often hosting playgrounds or public workout facilities.

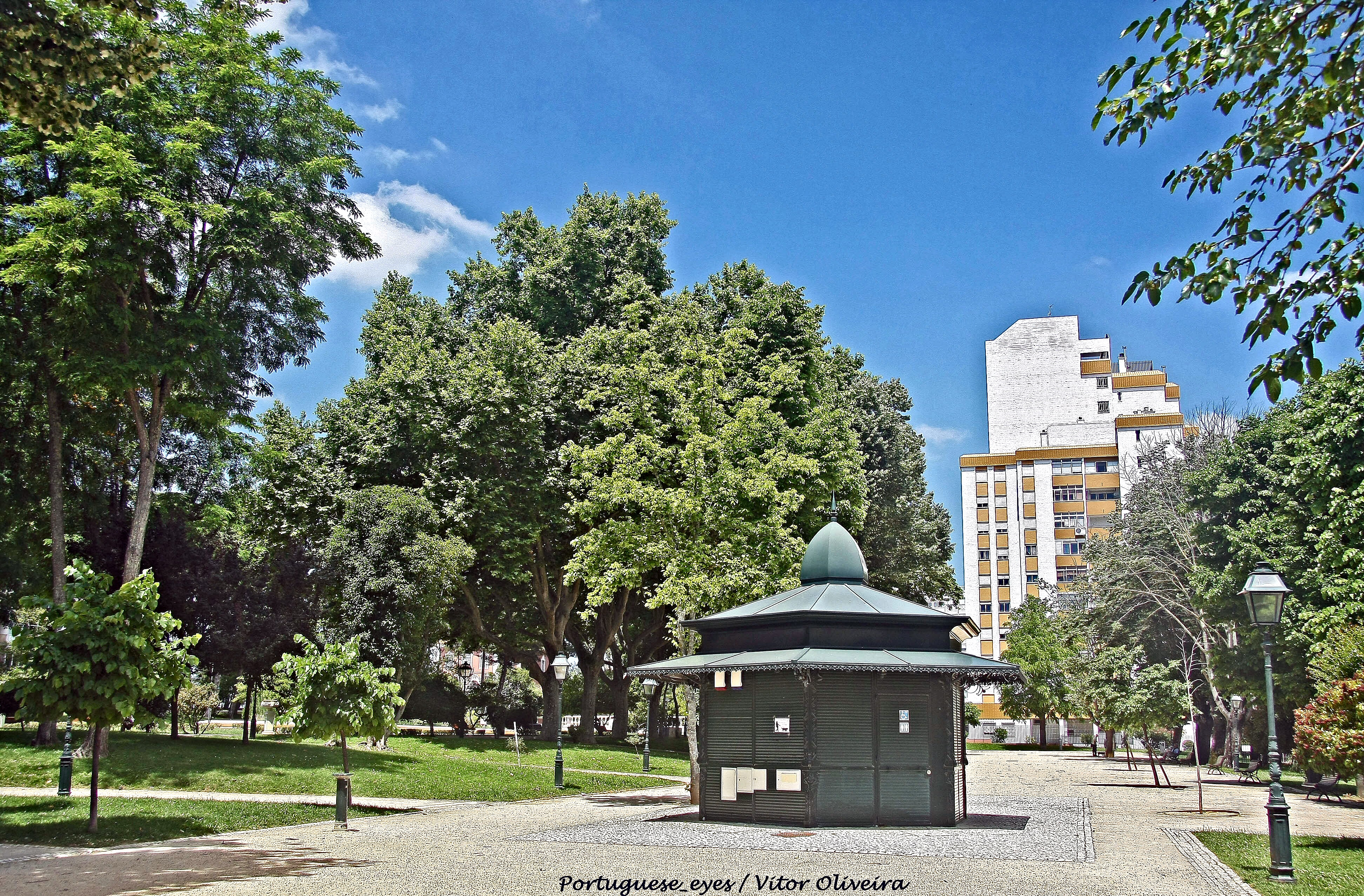
Garden in Santa Clara

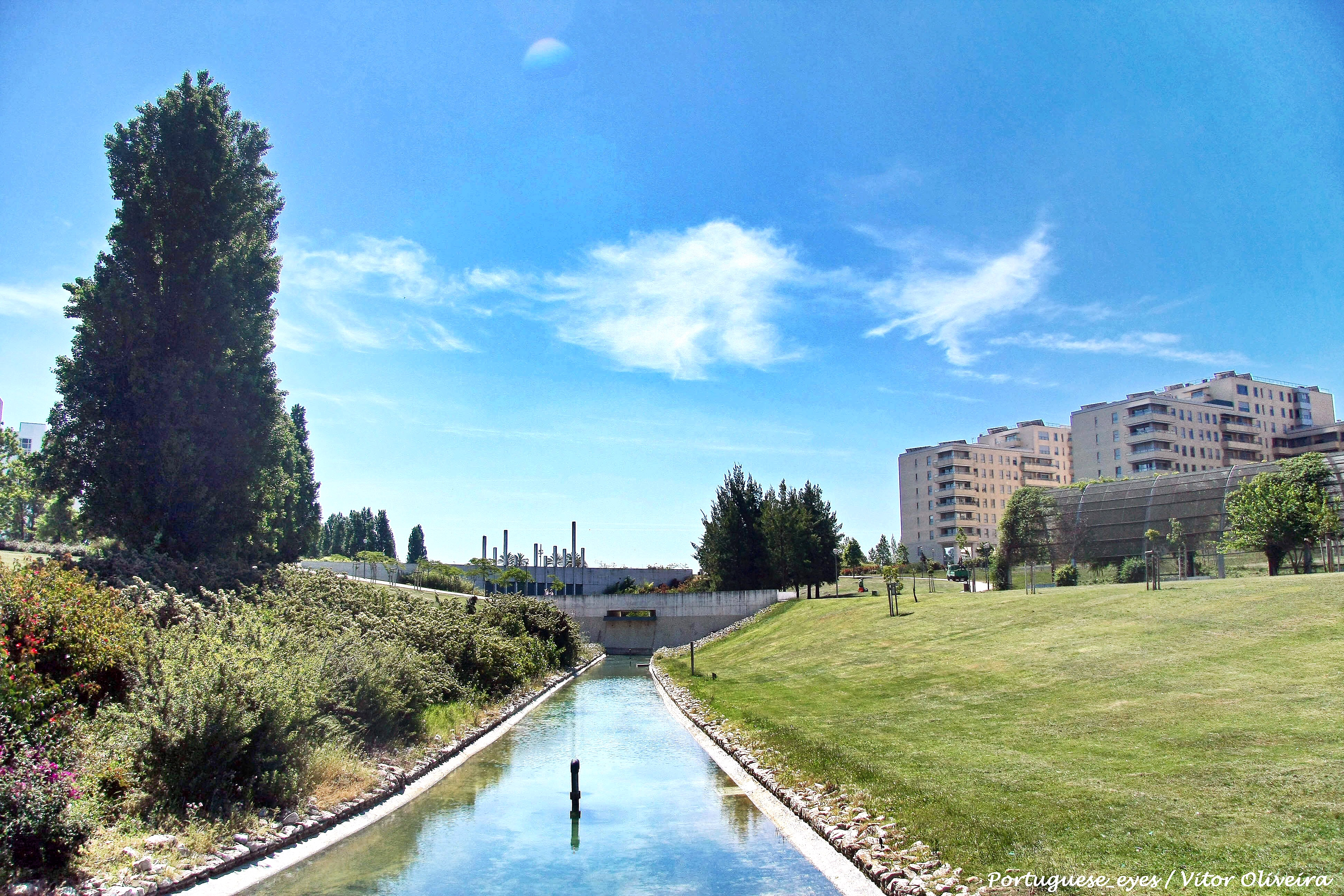
Artificial waterway in Santa Clara

These include Jardim Maria da Luz Ponces de Carvalho, Jardim do metro, Parque Urbano do Reguengo (with outdoor fitness facilities and a playground), Jardim da Paróquia De São Bartolomeu, Jardim da Praceta Fernando Valle, Largo das Galinheiras, Parque Urbano da Quinta de São João Baptista, Parque Oeste (with outdoor fitness facilities, water jets, pedestrian bridge and a playground), Campo das Amoreiras (with outdoor fitness facilities and a playground), Jardim de Santa Clara, Parque Urbano da Rua Raul Rego (with outdoor fitness facilities), Parque Urbano do Alto do Chapeleiro (with outdoor fitness facilities), Jardim da Ameixoeira and Parque agricola da Alta de Lisboa.

The biggest park in the parish is Parque Urbano do Vale da Ameixoeira: covering 20 hectares (49 acres), it is also equipped with recreation areas, picnic park, skate park, children's playgrounds and climbing block.

In recent years there, has been continual investment in public facilities such as children playgrounds, with many created alongside the development of the parish.

== Transportation ==
=== Subway ===
The parish hosts Ameixoeira metro station

== Headquarters and Branches of the Parish Council (Junta de Freguesia) ==
- Headquarters (Ameixoeira) – Largo do Ministro, 1
- Posto de Atendimento (Charneca) – Rua Tito de Morais, 21B

== Notable people ==
- João Fernandes Andeiro (1320–1383): Galician nobleman who played a very important role in Portuguese political events in the last quarter of the 14th century and became known as Conde Andeiro
- Afonso Pires da Charneca (1340–1392): Spanish nobleman and settler who settled in Charneca in the XIV century
- Martinho Afonso Pires de Miranda (1360–1416): Bishop of Coimbra and Archbishop of Braga
- Afonso Pires da Charneca (1385): Charneca settler
- Afonso da Guerra (Late 1300s – 1441): Lisbon alcalde
- Barnabé de Figueiredo Mascarenhas (1675–1723): Portuguese soldier who fought primarily against Ottoman and Arab pirates from present day Morocco and Algeria who attacked Portuguese ships along the late 17th and early 18th centuries
- Gonçalo Mendes de Brito: Portuguese jurist active in Ameixoeira between 1685 and 1690
- Bartolomeu Nunes Holtreman (1725–1781): Portuguese landowner of Flemish descent
- Jacinto Heliodoro de Aguiar Loureiro (1806 – ): Portuguese journalist, playwright and writer
- Manuel Gaspar de Almeida Noronha Portugal Camões de Albuquerque Moniz e Sousa (1845–1901): Portuguese nobleman, founder of Albergue das Crianças Abandonadas, a shelter for abandoned children
- Júlio de Castilho (1840–1919): Portuguese journalist, poet, writer and politician who distinguished himself as an olisipographer, publishing several works on the city of Lisbon and assembling an important personal collection of documents on the subject, now deposited in the National Library of Lisbon
- Carlos Fortes (1994): Portuguese footballer

== Streets ==
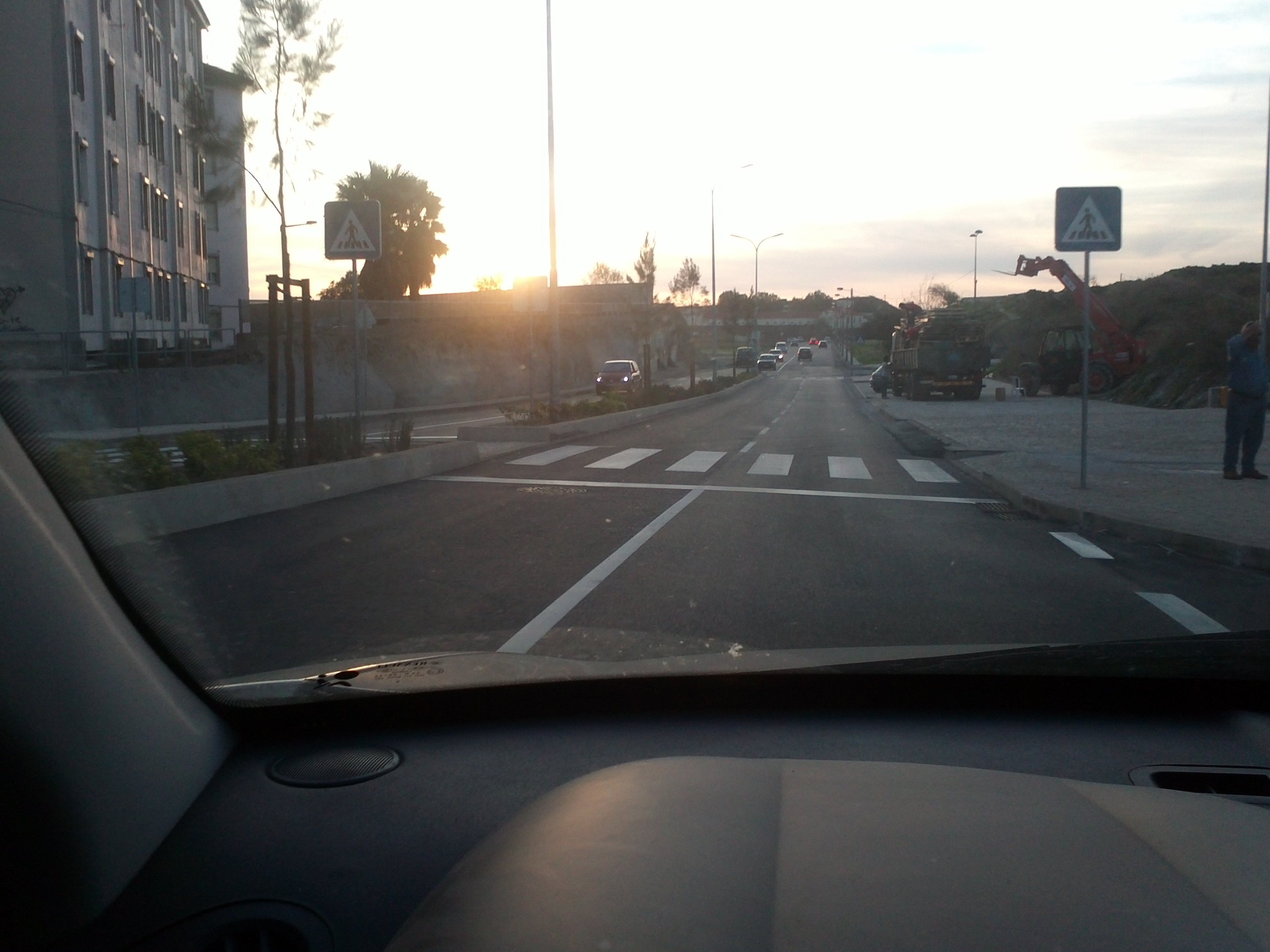
Rua Hermínio da Palma Inácio

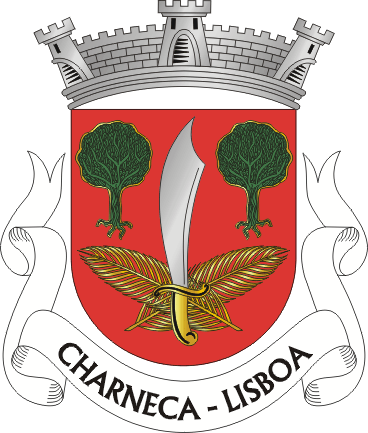
Coat of arms of former Charneca parish

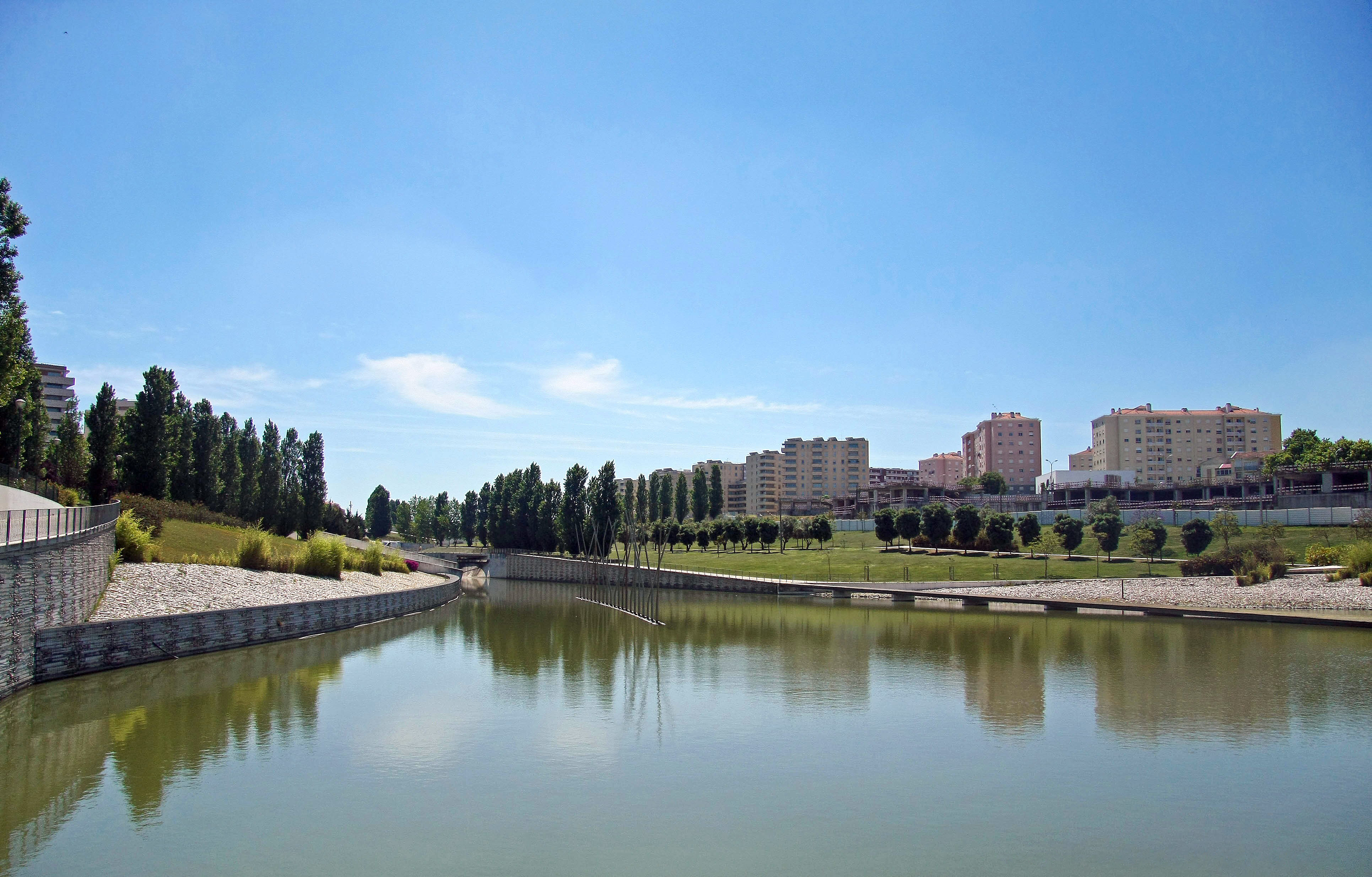
Public park

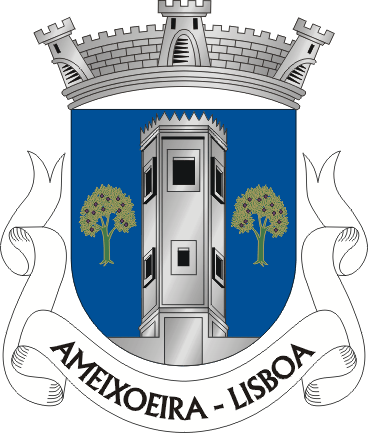
Coat of arms of former Ameixoeira parish

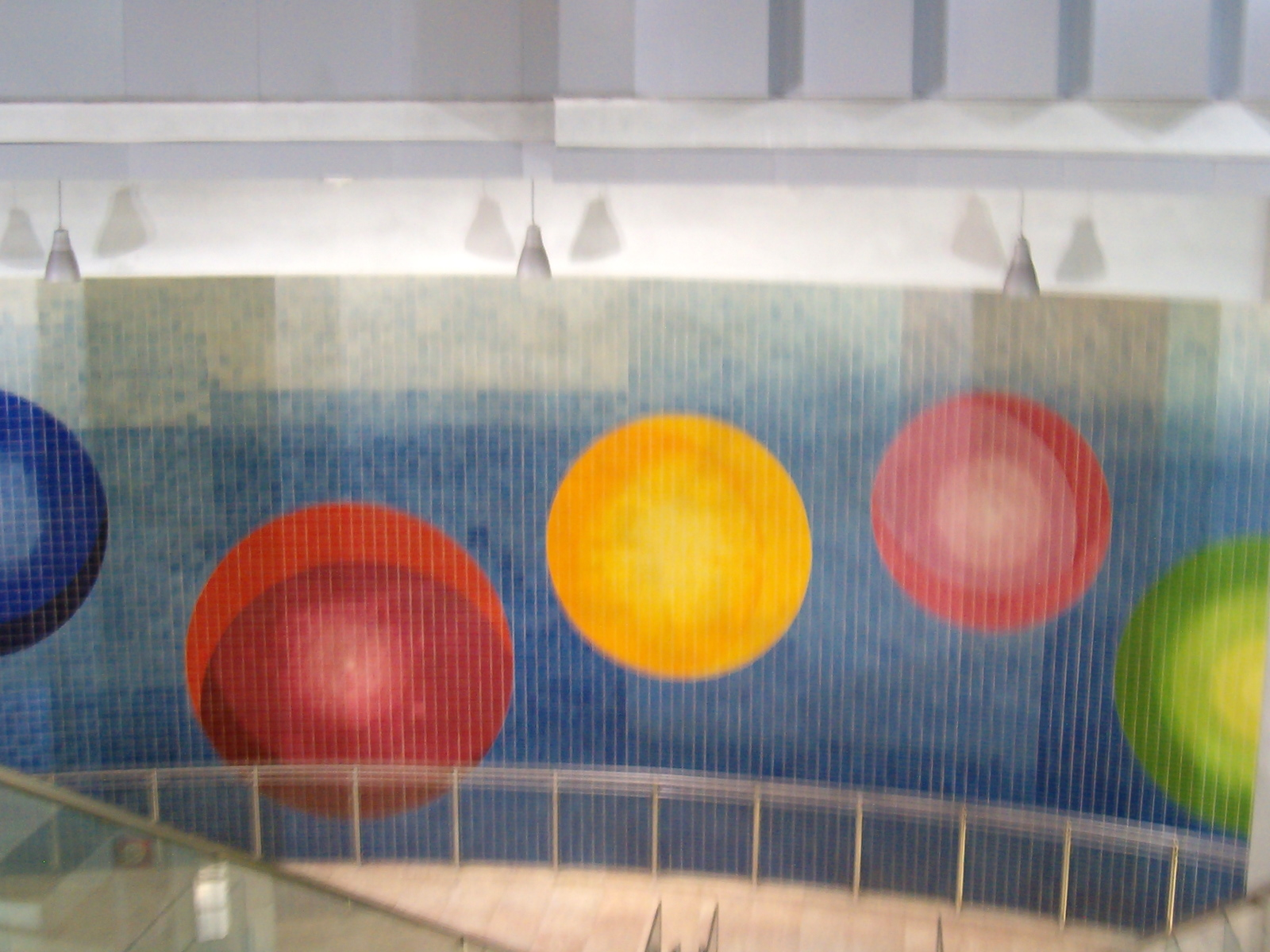
Modern azulejos in Santa Clara

The parish has 135 streets. They are:

- Alameda António Sérgio
- Avenida Dr. José Salvado Sampaio
- Avenida Glicínia Quartin
- Avenida Nuno Krus Abecasis
- Avenida Santos e Castro
- Avenida Sérgio Vieira de Mello
- Azinhaga da Cidade
- Azinhaga da Póvoa
- Azinhaga da Torrinha
- Azinhaga das Galinheiras
- Azinhaga de Santa Susana
- Azinhaga do Beco
- Azinhaga do Reguengo
- Azinhaga do Rio
- Azinhaga dos Milagres
- Beco dos Ferreiros
- Calçada de Carriche
- Calçada do Forte da Ameixoeira
- Calçada do Poço
- Campo das Amoreiras
- Estrada da Ameixoeira
- Estrada da Circunvalação de Lisboa
- Estrada da Póvoa
- Estrada de São Bartolomeu
- Estrada do Desvio
- Estrada do Forte da Ameixoeira
- Estrada do Manique
- Estrada do Pisa Pimenta
- Estrada do Poço de Baixo
- Jardim Maria da Luz Ponces de Carvalho
- Largo das Galinheiras
- Largo das Peneireiras
- Largo do Médico
- Largo do Ministro
- Largo do Terreiro
- Largo dos Defensores da República
- Praça Dom António Ribeiro
- Praceta da Quinta de São João Baptista
- Praceta Fernando Valle
- Rampa do Mercado
- Rotunda Almirante Pinheiro de Azevedo
- Rua Actor Epifânio
- Rua Alberto Barbosa
- Rua António Aleixo
- Rua António Botto
- Rua António Dacosta
- Rua António Duarte
- Rua António Vilar
- Rua Armando Ferreira
- Rua Arnaldo Assis Pacheco
- Rua Artur Ramos
- Rua Barata Feyo
- Rua Bernardo Marques
- Rua Berta Cardoso
- Rua Blasco Hugo Fernandes
- Rua Brunilde Júdice
- Rua Carlos Aboim Inglez
- Rua Carlos Amaro
- Rua Carlos Rocha
- Rua Cidade de Tomar
- Rua Comandante Fontoura da Costa
- Rua Constança Capdeville
- Rua da Assunção às Galinheiras
- Rua da Quinta das Lavadeiras
- Rua da Quinta de Santa Susana
- Rua das Calvanas
- Rua das Raparigas
- Rua de Nossa Senhora da Encarnação
- Rua de São José à Charneca
- Rua Direita da Ameixoeira
- Rua do Alto do Chapeleiro
- Rua do Bairro da Cáritas
- Rua do Eucalipto às Galinheiras
- Rua do Grafanil
- Rua dos Balsares de Baixo
- Rua dos Sete Céus
- Rua Eduardo Covas
- Rua Elina Guimarães
- Rua Emídio Santana
- Rua Engº Quartin Graça
- Rua Fernanda Alves
- Rua Fernando Cabral
- Rua Fernando Gusmão
- Rua Frederico de Brito
- Rua General França Borges
- Rua Hein Semke
- Rua Hermínio da Palma Inácio
- Rua Hugo Casaes
- Rua Jaime Relvas
- Rua Jaime Santos
- Rua João Amaral
- Rua João Lourenço Rebelo
- Rua Joaquim Cordeiro
- Rua Jorge Croner de Vasconcelos
- Rua Jorge de Sena
- Rua José Viana
- Rua Lino de Carvalho
- Rua Luís Oliveira Guimarães
- Rua Luís Sá
- Rua Maluda (Maria de Lurdes Ribeiro)
- Rua Mantero Belard
- Rua Manuel António Gomes
- Rua Manuel Lopes
- Rua Manuel Martins da Hora
- Rua Maria de Lourdes Pintasilgo
- Rua Maria Júdice da Costa
- Rua Martin Luther King
- Rua Melo Antunes
- Rua Norberto Lopes
- Rua Octávio Pato
- Rua Pablo Neruda
- Rua Primeiro de Maio ao Grafanil
- Rua Prof. Adelino da Palma Carlos
- Rua Prof. Barahona Fernandes
- Rua Prof. José Pinto Correia
- Rua Quinta da Assunção
- Rua Raul de Carvalho
- Rua Raúl Portela
- Rua Raul Rego
- Rua Reis Pinto
- Rua Rogério de Moura
- Rua Rui Coelho
- Rua Ruy Cinatti
- Rua Tavares Belo
- Rua Teresa de Saldanha
- Rua Tito de Morais
- Rua Varela Silva
- Rua Vasco da Gama Fernandes
- Rua Vasco de Lima Couto
- Rua Vicente Lusitano
- Rua Victor Cunha Rego
- Rua Vitorino Nemésio
- Rua Wenceslau Pinto
- Travessa de Santo André à Ameixoeira
- Travessa de Santo António
