= Fort of Ameixoeira =

19th-century fort near Lisbon, Portugal

- Forte da Ameixoeira or Forte D. Carlos I
- Lisbon District, Near Lisbon in Portugal

Site information
- Type: Bastion Fort
- Owner: Portuguese government
- Open to the public: No
- Condition: Restored

Location
- Coordinates: 38°47′12″N 9°09′08″W

Site history
- Built: 1901
- Fate: Home of Portuguese Security and Intelligence Services

The Fort of Ameixoeira, also known as the King Carlos I Fort, is located in the former parish of Ameixoeira, now part of the Santa Clara parish of Lisbon, capital of Portugal. It currently serves as the headquarters of the Serviço de Informações de Segurança (SIS), the Portuguese Security and Intelligence Service. It was constructed as part of the Campo Entrincheirado (Entrenched Field), a group of fortifications built at the end of the 19th century and beginning of the 20th century to protect Lisbon against possible invasion.

== History ==
The first archival references to the construction project of a fort at Ameixoeira date from November 20, 1875. However, progress in construction was slow. Excavation and earth-removal work was completed only by the end of 1888 and the building was not finished until December 1901. At this time, it was garrisoned by an artillery regiment, although necessary lighting work was not completed until 1906. The fort was named after the then King of Portugal, D. Carlos I. It originally covered approximately 73,900 m^{2}, but around 5,400 m^{2} was lost when a new road was constructed. The covered area is 19,019 m^{2}.

In the context of the crisis that led to the fall of the First Portuguese Republic, the fort suffered an assault on 11 August 1924 as part of an attempted but unsuccessful military coup by supporters of Manuel Gomes da Costa. After World War I, the concept of a fixed defence, on which the Campo Entrincheirado was based, became obsolete and the forts began to be used for other purposes. Some were used for anti-aircraft positions, while the Fort of Ameixoeira's 88 storerooms were used for ammunition deposits. On 28 September 1943 one of the storerooms exploded, killing six soldiers and completely destroying the south wing of the building. The cause of the explosion has never been fully determined.

== The present ==
Reconstruction only started in 1950. Concurrently with the reconstruction work on the south wing, the north wing also saw significant improvements. Modern water, sewage and electricity installations were installed at that time. The fort then continued to function as a warehouse until 1989. After that it became very degraded, reportedly being used by drug addicts. Towards the end of the 20th century, the ministries of Culture and National Defence agreed that it could be used as a storage location for museums and national monuments. However, in 2006 it was assigned to the Intelligence Services.
