= Instituto Superior de Gestão =

Business school in Lisbon, Portugal

Coordinates: 38°46′7.6″N 9°9′32.52″W

Instituto Superior de Gestão – School of Management
- Instituto Superior de Gestão – Escola de Gestão
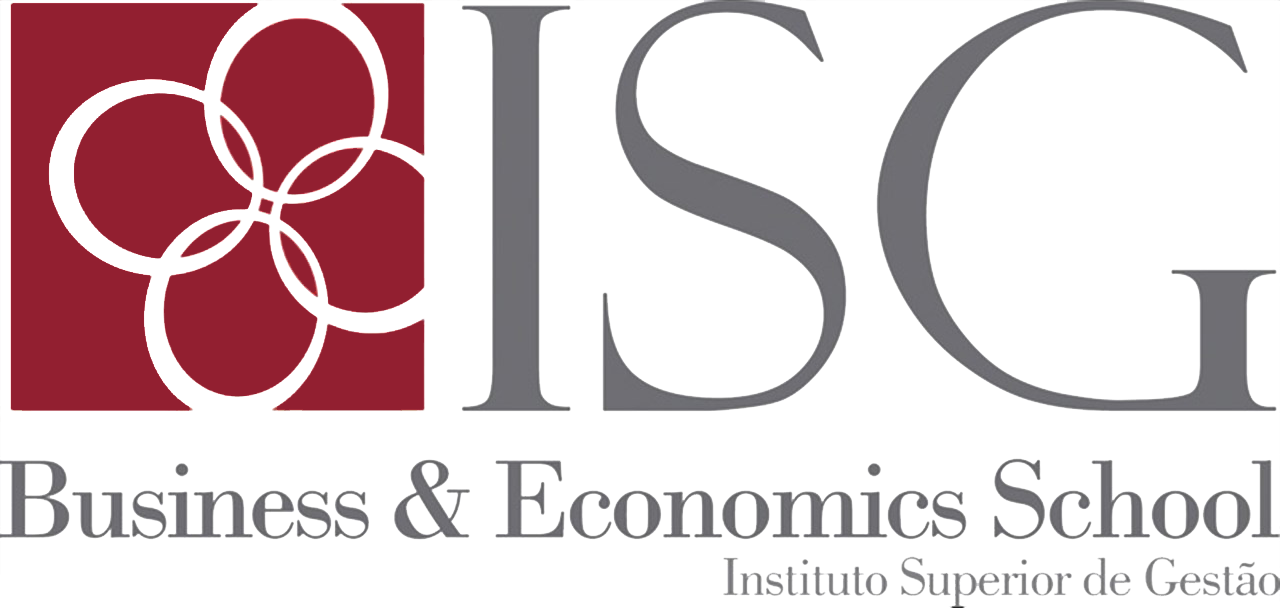
- Type: Private University
- Established: 1978
- Rector: Manuel de Almeida Damásio
- Dean: Prof. Doutor Miguel Varela
- Location: Lisbon, Portugal
- Campus: Urban
- Website: www.isg.pt

Instituto Superior de Gestão (ISG) is a private business school. ISG was founded in Lisbon, Portugal, in 1978. ISG is known as an innovative multidisciplinary Business School. ISG is located in Ameixoeira, a fast-growing region, on a part of what was once the Santa Clara's farm.

At ISG, management education integrates knowledge and practical work, focused on challenges faced by managers in their day-to-day operations. ISG closely collaborates with companies. The school has up-to-date equipment.

== Facilities ==
The ISG Business School functions as a reference school for management training in Portugal. The core elements in its teaching are its integrated knowledge & practical approach of teaching, which reflect the challenges faced by managers on a day-to-day basis. ISG has modern facilities and equipment.

The school buildings cover a built-up area of approximately 8,600 square metres (93,000 sq ft). The Institute has one auditorium with a seating capacity of 420, two 120-seat auditoria, 24 classrooms, a library and archive for documents, a self-access centre of languages, computer laboratories, offices, a common room for teachers, a bookshop/stationer, a bar and canteen, a social services centre and a common room for students.

The Palace of Santa Clara is a traditional recovered building housing administrative offices and classrooms, an annex for the offices of the Students' Association and the Academic Music Troupe.

== Courses ==
ISG is structured around three main scientific departments. It offers 4 undergraduate Degree programmes, 11 Master's degree programmes, and 10 Post-graduate Degree courses. Additionally, ISG offers vocational and continuing education courses. The courses fulfill the requirements for European Higher Education, and comply with the European Credit Transfer systems (ECTS). All undergraduate and graduate degrees are in compliance with the principles and norms of the Bologna Directives. All undergraduate and graduate degrees are in compliance with the principles and norms of the Bologna Directives.
