= Charneca, Lisbon =

Charneca
- Civil parish
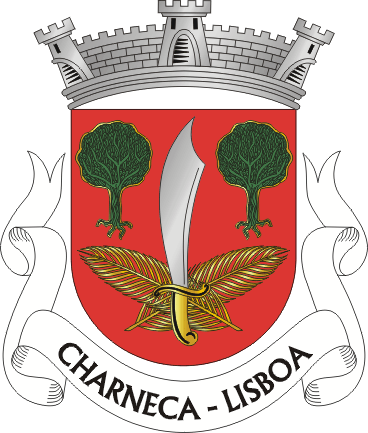
- Coat of arms

- Location in Portugal
- Coordinates: 38°47′07″N 9°08′42″W
- Country: Portugal
- Region: Lisbon
- Metropolitan area: Lisbon
- District: Lisbon
- Municipality: Lisbon
- Disbanded: 2012

Area
  - Total: 1.70 km^{2} (0.66 sq mi)

Population (2001)
  - Total: 10,509
  - Density: 6,200/km^{2} (16,000/sq mi)
- Time zone: UTC+00:00 (WET)
  - Summer (DST): UTC+01:00 (WEST)

Charneca or Charneca do Lumiar (English: Lumiar heathland), was a Portuguese parish (freguesia) in the municipality of Lisbon. It was created in 1585. Between 1852 and 1886 this parish was part of the former municipality of Olivais. With the 2012 Administrative Reform, the parish merged with the Ameixoeira parish into a new one named Santa Clara.
