= Ameixoeira =

Quarter and former civil parish in Lisbon, Portugal

- Quarter and former civil parish
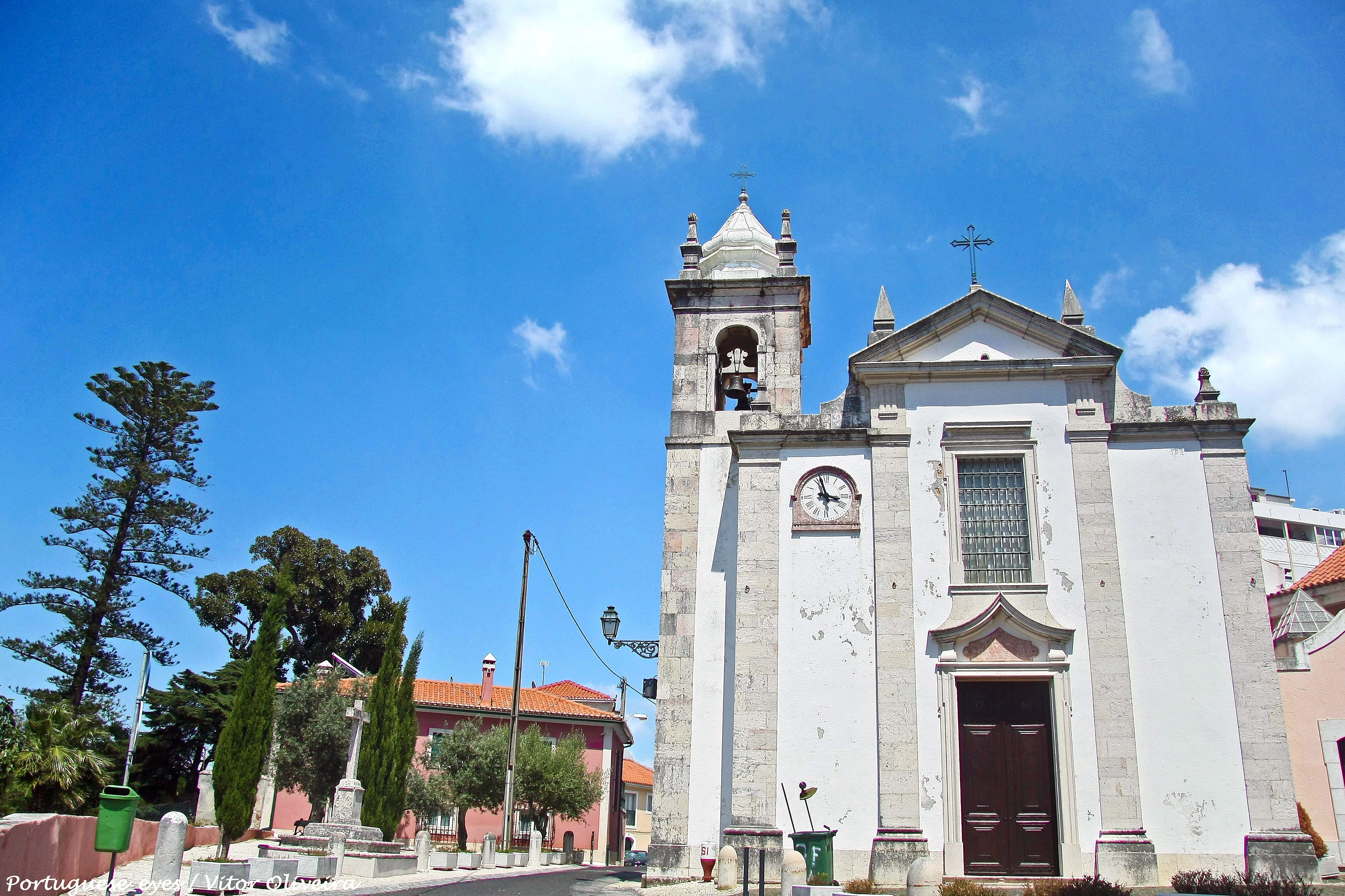
- Church of Our Lady of the Incarnation of Ameixoeira and its cross in the older section of the neighbourhood

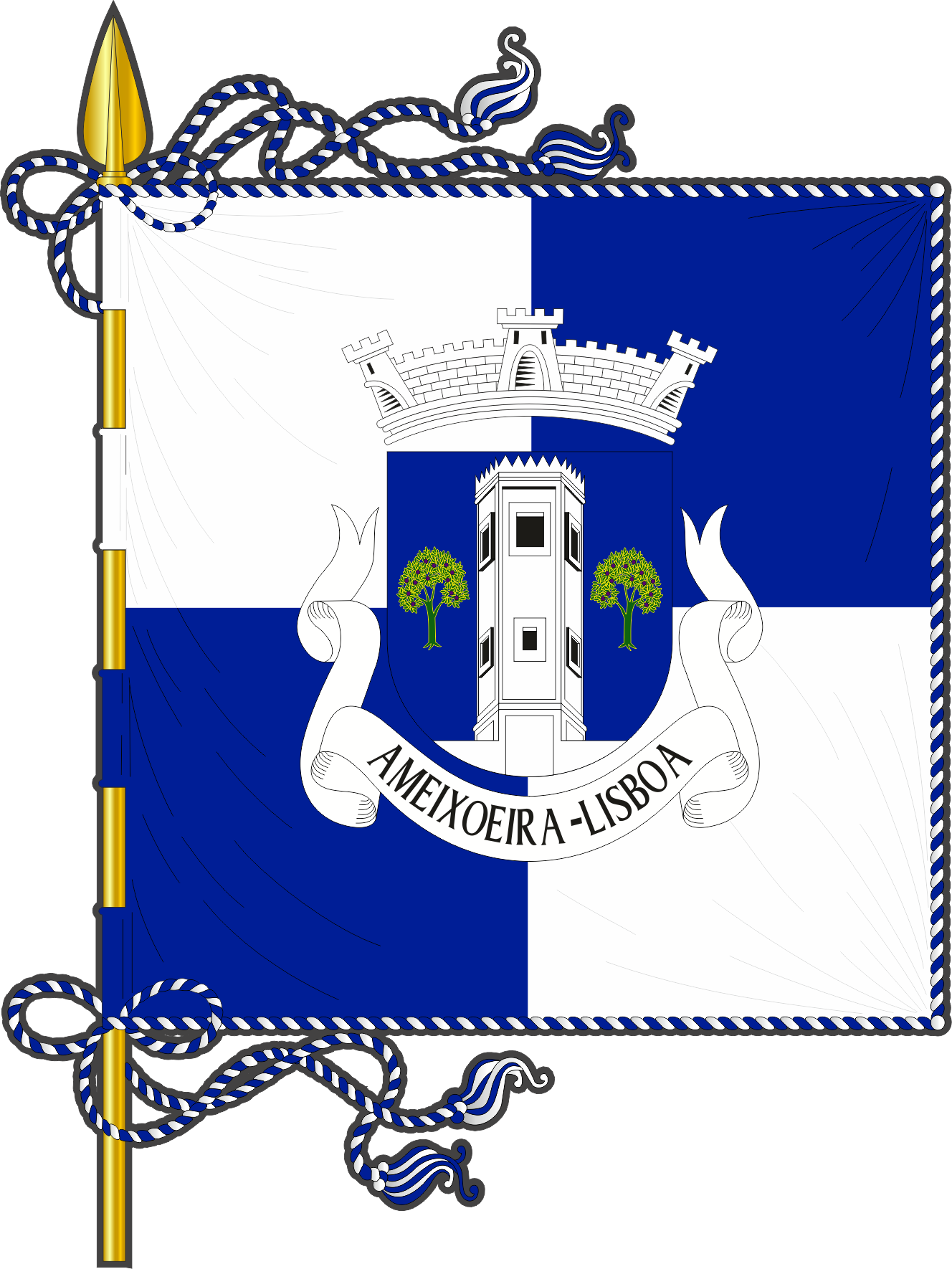
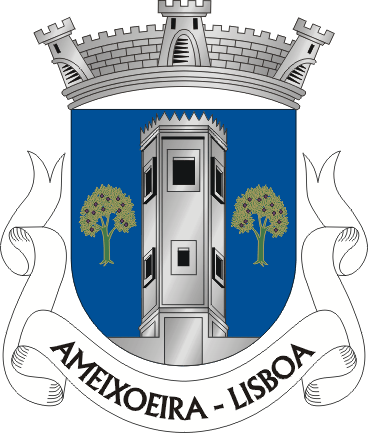
- Flag Coat of arms
- Interactive map of Ameixoeira
- Location within Portugal
- Coordinates: 38.782°N 9.159°W
- Country: Portugal
- Metro area: Lisbon
- Region: Greater Lisbon
- District: Lisbon
- Municipality: Lisbon
- Creation: 1541
- Part of the Olivais Municipality: 1852
- (Re-)Integration into Lisbon: 1886
- Dissolution: 8 November 2012

Government
  - Type: Civil parish
  - Body: Junta de Freguesia
  - President (last, 2009-12): Maria Albertina Ferreira (Lisboa com Sentido (PSD-CDS–PP-MPT-PPM))

Area
  - Total: 1.61 km^{2} (0.62 sq mi)

Population (2011)
  - Total: 11,863
  - Density: 7,370/km^{2} (19,100/sq mi)
- Demonym: ameixoeirense
- Time zone: UTC+00:00 (WET)
  - Summer (DST): UTC+01:00 (WEST)
- Postal code: 1750
- Patron Saint: Our Lady of the Incarnation
- Former seat: Largo do Ministro, 1; 1750-200 Lisboa
- Former website: http://www.jf-ameixoeira.pt
- Now part of: Santa Clara

Ameixoeira (Portuguese pronunciation: [ɐmɐjʃuˈɐjɾɐ]) is a typical quarter and Portuguese former civil parish, located in the municipality of Lisbon. It had a population of 11,864 inhabitants (2011) and a total area of 1.61 km². With the 2012 Administrative Reform, the parish merged with the neighbouring Charneca parish into a new one named Santa Clara.
