= Lumiar =

- Civil parish
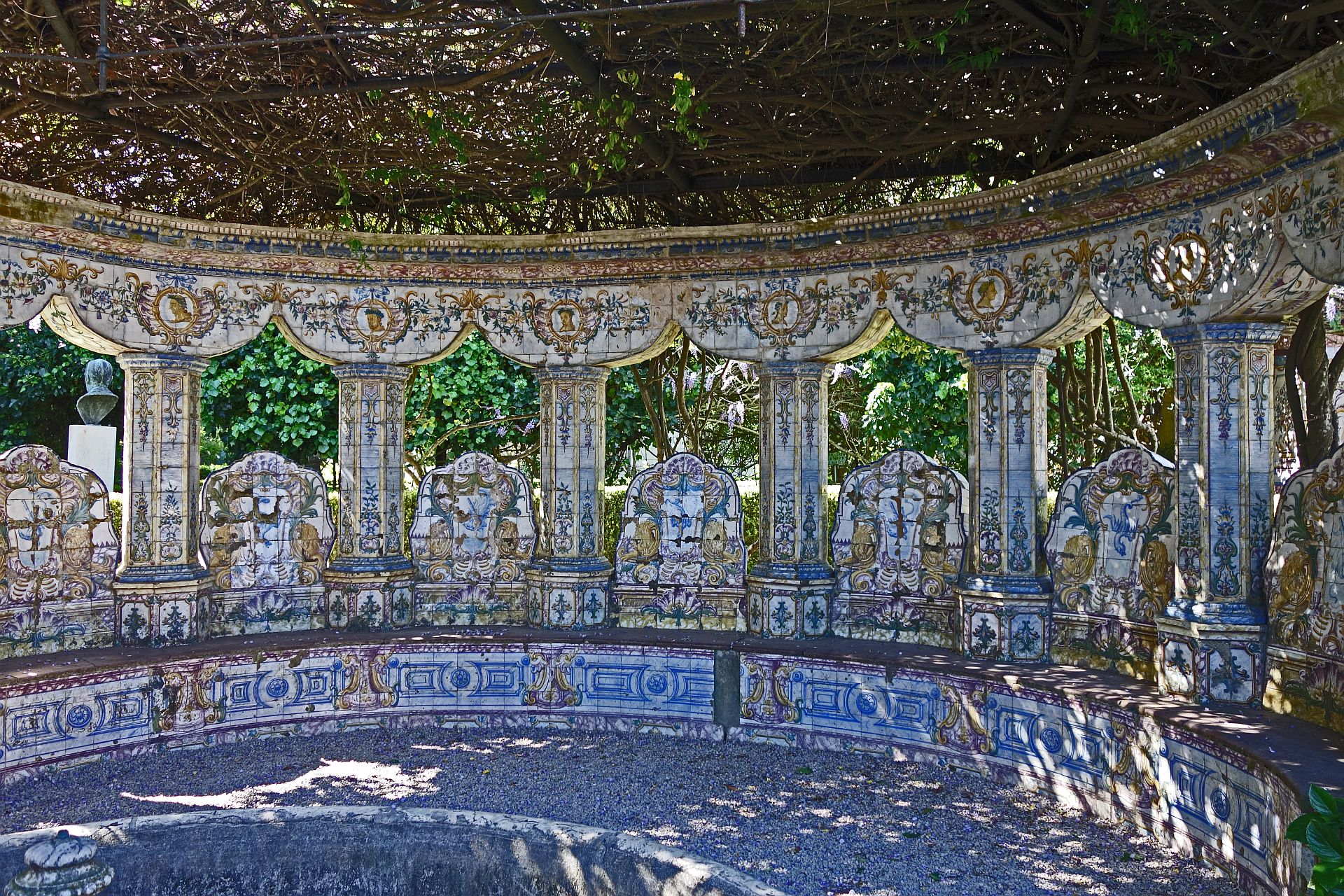
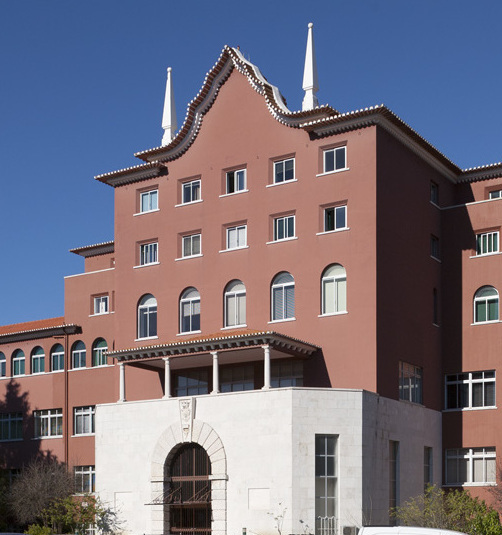
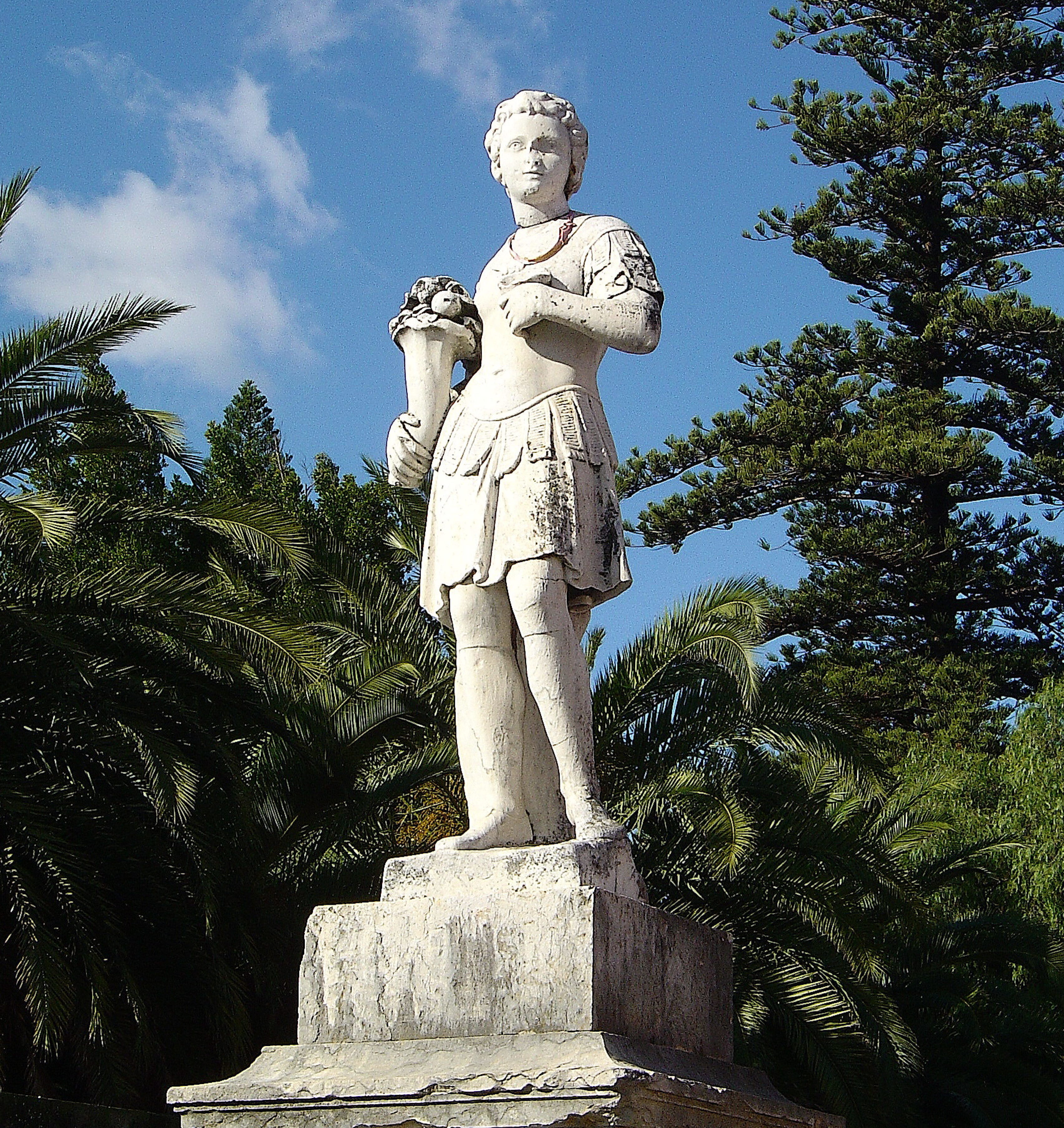
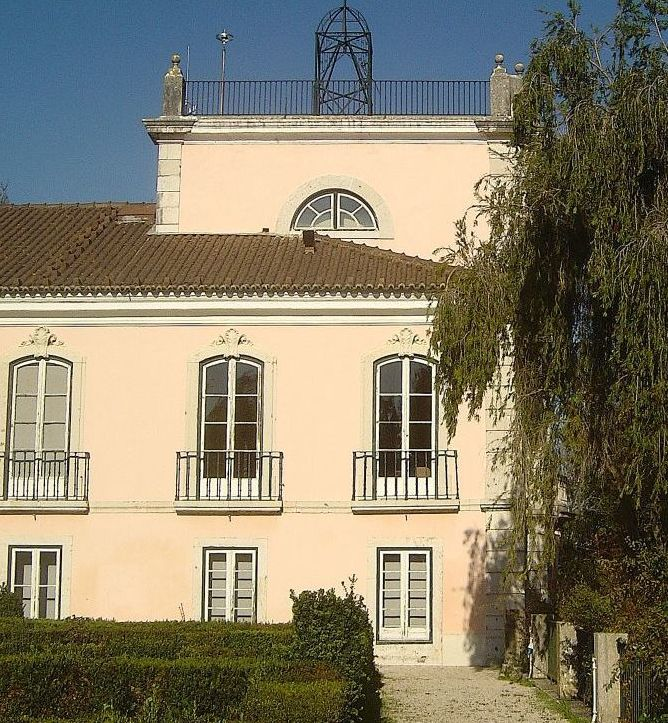
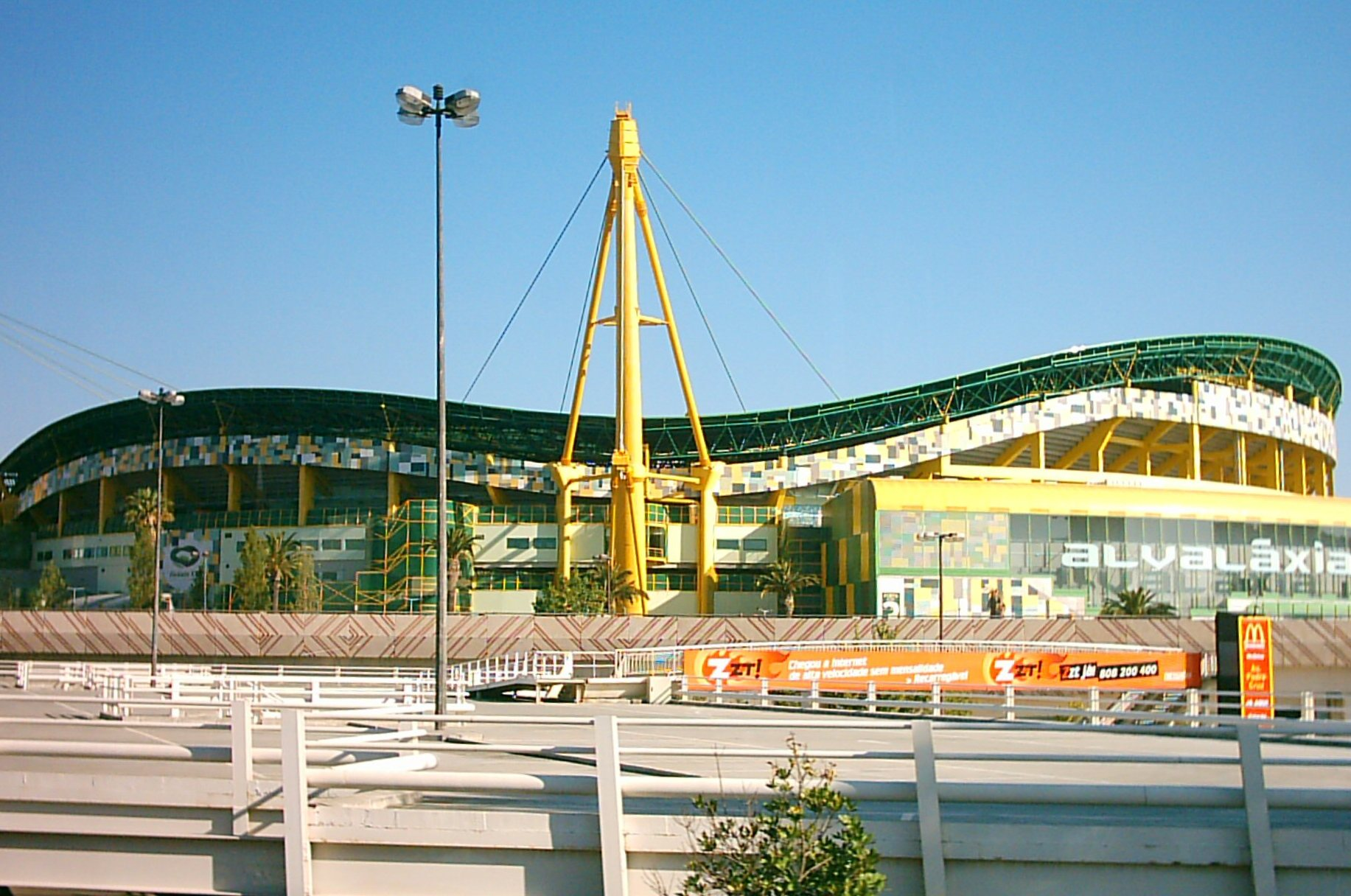
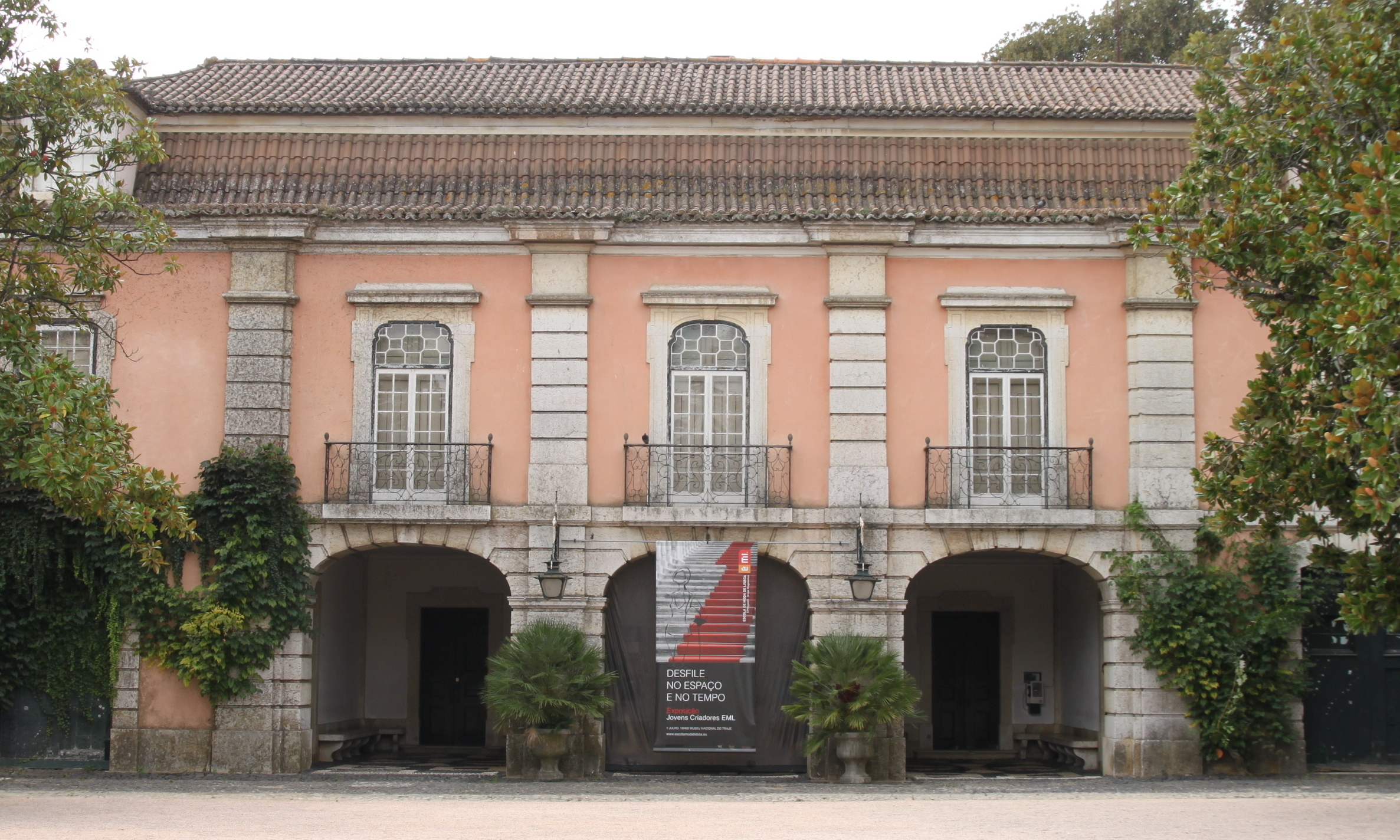
- Clockwise: Quinta dos azulejos; National Theatre and Dance Museum; Monteiro-Mor Park; National Museum of Costume; Alvalade Stadium; Colégio de Santa Doroteia

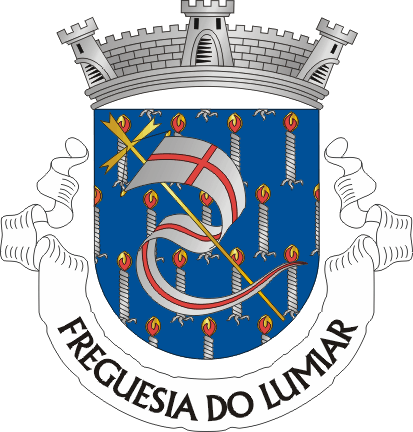
- Coat of arms

- Coordinates: 38.765°N 9.159°W
- Country: Portugal
- Region: Lisbon
- Metropolitan area: Lisbon
- District: Lisbon
- Municipality: Lisbon

Area
  - Total: 6.57 km^{2} (2.54 sq mi)

Population (2021)
  - Total: 46,334
  - Density: 7,050/km^{2} (18,300/sq mi)
- Time zone: UTC+00:00 (WET)
  - Summer (DST): UTC+01:00 (WEST)
- Website: http://www.jf-lumiar.pt/

Lumiar (Portuguese pronunciation: [luˈmjaɾ]) is a freguesia (civil parish) and typical quarter of Lisbon, the capital city of Portugal. Located in northern Lisbon, Lumiar is east of Carnide, north of Alvalade, west of Olivais, and south of Santa Clara and partially of Lisbon's border with Odivelas. The population in 2021 was 46,334.

== History ==
Located now within the municipality of Lisbon, it was established in the 13th century.

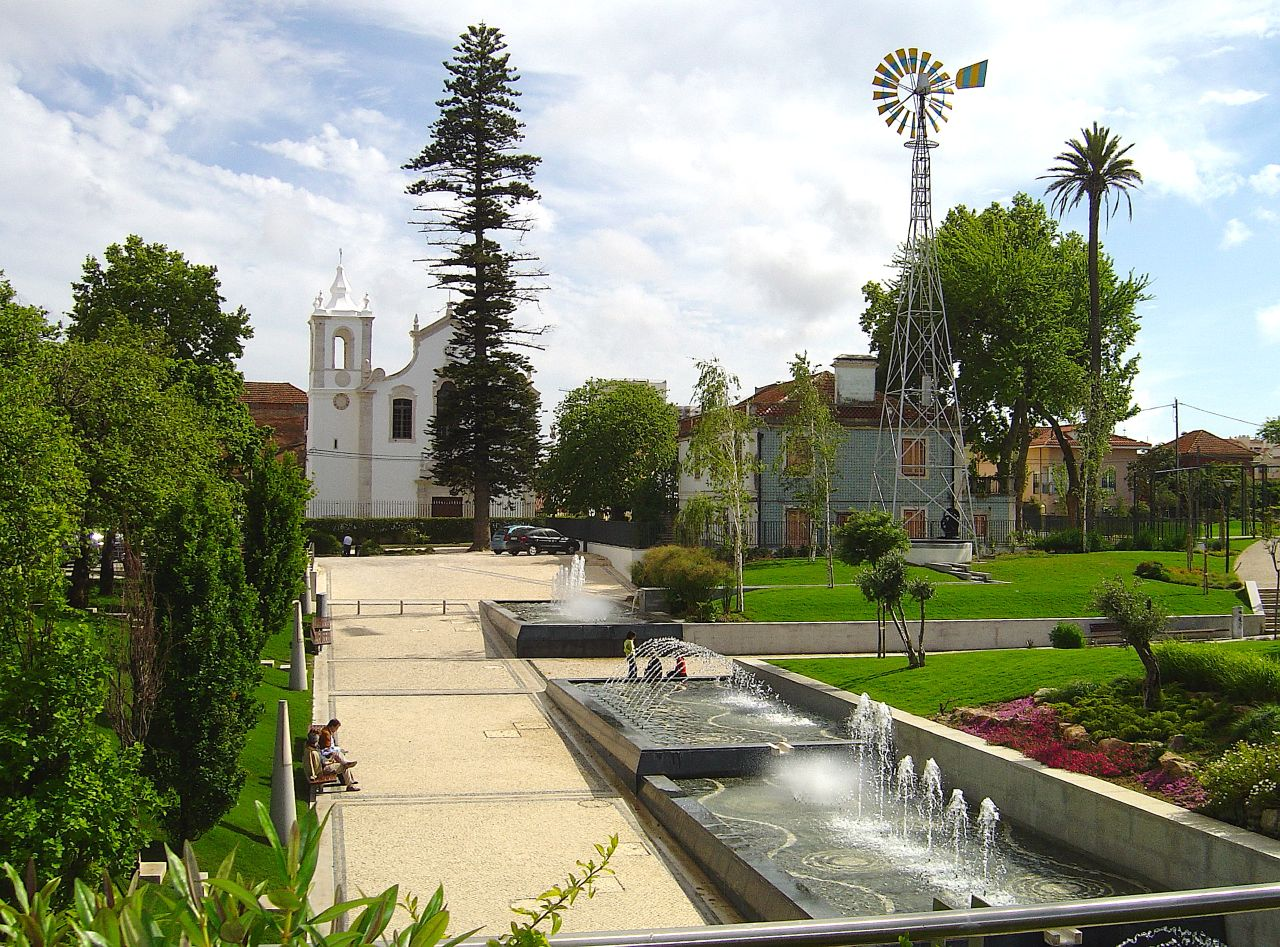
Jardim Prof. Francisco Caldeira Cabral with the Igreja Paroquial de Nossa Senhora da Porta do Céu

The parish of Lumiar was established on April 2, 1266. In 1312, King Denis (D. Dinis) divided the assets of the Count of Barcelos, allocating to his illegitimate son and the Count's son-in-law, D. Afonso Sanches, a country estate in Lumiar, which came to be known as the Palace of the Infant D. Afonso Sanches (Paços do Infante D. Afonso Sanches). During the reign of King Afonso IV, this noble residence became known as the Lumiar Palace (Paço do Lumiar), a designation still in use today.

In the early 18th century, Lumiar was described as "a place of noble estates, olive groves, and vineyards," with the main agricultural products being wine, wheat, barley, and olive oil.

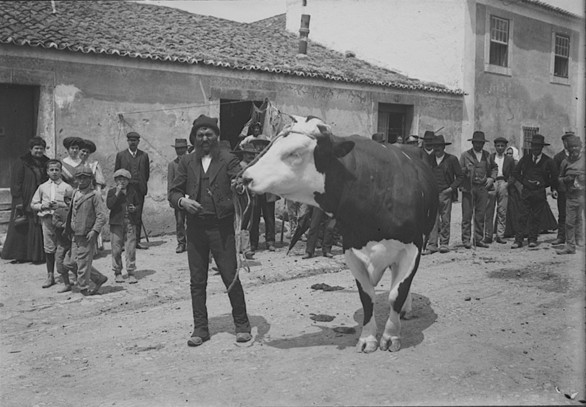
Peasants in Lumiar, 1910 ca.

The parish, once a rural area, has witnessed a steady urban development since the beginning of the 19th century. Still, it was not uncommon for peasants to come to Lumiar up to the first half of the 20th century.

From 1852 to 1886, this parish was part of the Olivais municipality, finally being incorporated into the territory of the city of Lisbon on July 18, 1885.

In the 20th century, there was a significant population increase in the parish — from 2,840 inhabitants in 1900 to over 30,000 in 2000 — resulting in the almost definitive loss of the old village's characteristics due to various residential developments. The current major focus is the Alta de Lisboa neighborhood.

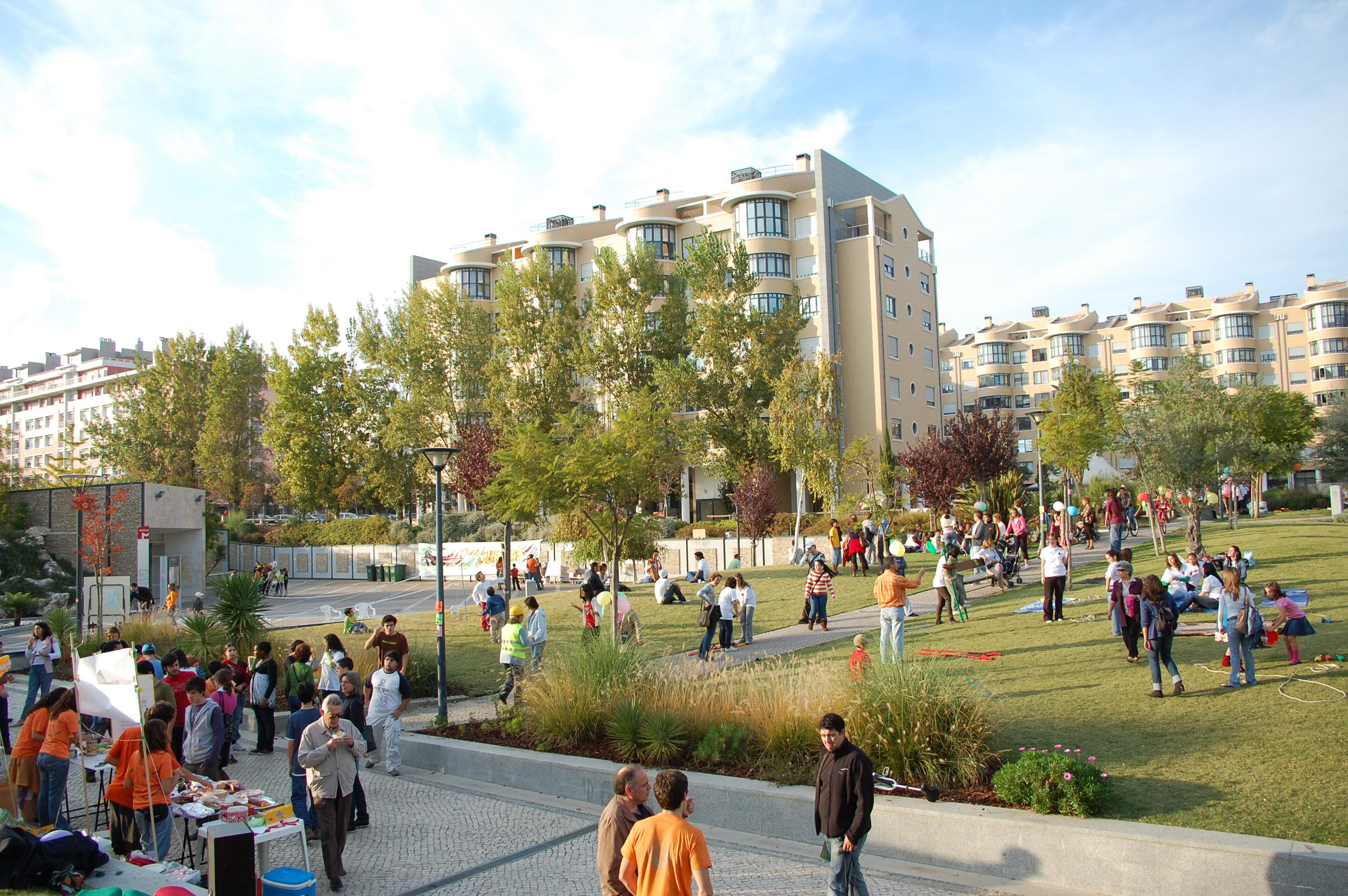
Festival de Telheiras

In the 21st century, on October 10, 2007, the final stretch of the North-South Axis (Eixo Norte-Sul) was inaugurated, facilitating traffic flow throughout the Portuguese capital.

The Lumiar Parish is served by the recreational park Quinta das Conchas e dos Lilases.

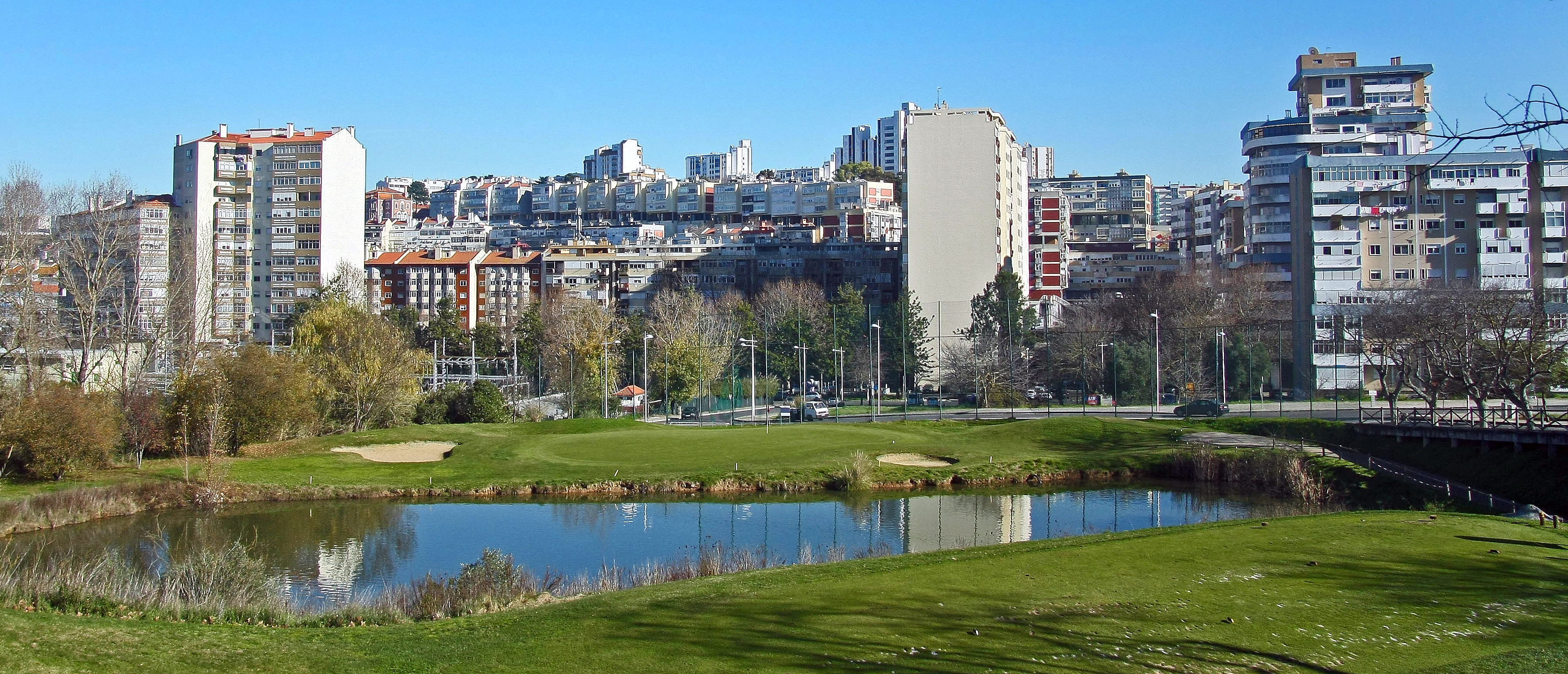
View of Golfe Paço do Lumiar, a golf course in Lumiar

The parish is composed of 5 major neighbourhoods:

- Alta de Lisboa: New neighborhood created as an ambitious real estate project that includes the old neighborhoods of Musgueira Norte and Sul and Calvanas; it is the commercial name of Alto do Lumiar
- Calçada de Carriche
- Quinta das Conchas
- Paço do Lumiar: where its historical complex stands out
- Telheiras (partially shared with Carnide)

== Demographics ==
=== Historical resident population (before the 2012 Administrative Reform) ===
Historical population
Year	Pop.	±%
1960	9,140	—
1970	19,910	+117.8%
1981	29,645	+48.9%
1991	35,390	+19.4%
2001	37,693	+6.5%
2011	41,163	+9.2%
2021	46,334	+12.6%
Source: INE

Lumiar before and after the 2012 Portuguese administrative reform

The resident population recorded according to Censuses carried over the years is shown in the following table for Lumiar. It is noteworthy that Lumiar gained 37,194 people from 1960 to 2021 or 406.94% of its 1960 population in just 60 years, not having recorded a single population loss since 1960.

Adjusting the 2011 data to the new 2012 boundaries, the population recorded for Lumiar in 2011 stood at 45,605, mainly people hailing from Carnide.

Correcting for the 2012 adjustment due to the new parish's limits, the demographic growth witnessed between 2011 and 2021 stood at +729, or +1.60%. Although at a slow pace, the population grew during the said decade, contrarily to the population of Lisbon as a whole.

=== Demographic statistics ===
- Age

The last censuses show that the parish's population is ageing at a fast pace: in 2021 25.78% of the population was below 25 and, at the same time, more than a fifth (20.91%) of the residents was 65 or older.

Distribution of Population by Age Groups
Year	0-14 Years	0-14 Years %	15-24 Years	15-24 Years %	25-64 Years	25-64 Years %	> 65 Years	> 65 Years %
2021	6,790	14.65%	5,154	11.12%	24,701	53.31%	9,689	20.91%

- Religion
Religion in Lumiar (Census 2021)
1. Catholicism (69.5%)
2. Protestantism (1.53%)
3. Jehovah's Witnesses and Other Christian (1.27%)
4. Orthodoxy (0.49%)
5. Islam (0.79%)
6. Hinduism (0.38%)
7. Buddhism (0.33%)
8. Judaism (0.09%)
9. Other religions (0.34%)
10. No religion (25.2%)

The parish is predominantly catholic and 72.85% of the population aged 15 or above are followers of a Christian or Jeovah's Witness denomination as of 2021.

Interestingly, around 25.23% of the population doesn't practice a religion and is thus non religious.

The presence of minor religions such as Islam, Hinduism and Buddhism (1.92% of the population amongst the three) is probably due to an increasing community of people coming from India, Pakistan, Bangladesh or Nepal.

The Radha Krishna Temple of the Hindu community is located in the parish.

- Immigration

In 2021, 5.08% of the population of the parish was constituted by foreigners. In particular, amongst women foreigners were 5.48% of the total. This means that in Lumiar there are 2,356 resident foreigners, a sharp increase from 2011, when there were 1,617 resident foreigners (3.55%). Since the foreign population increased by 739 people from 2011 to 2021 (adjusting for the new boundaries) and given that the total population of the parish (adjusting for the new boundaries) increased by 729 units in the same timespan, it is noteworthy that the total population would have decreased weren't it for the increase in immigration; it is also noteworthy that this number only takes into account foreign citizens, thus excluding people who have subsequently acquired Portuguese nationality. The largest group of foreigners is constituted by Brazilians (751 people or +89.17% since 2011), nationals of PALOP countries (527 people or +12.13% since 2011), Chinese (193 people or +46.21%), Spaniards (135 or +18.42% since 2011) and people from the Indian Subcontinent, most notably Nepalis and Indians, totaling 118 people, or recording an increase of +555.56% since 2011.

Dealing with the foreign-born population, 13.02% of the parish's population was born abroad as of 2021. The most common countries of birth were PALOP countries (2,777 people), Brazil (1,234 people), France (224 people), China (185 people), and the Indian Subcontinent (185 people). Of the Portuguese nationals born abroad, the most common countries of birth were PALOP countries (2,304 people) and Brazil (464 people), all countries having ancient historical ties with Portugal as well as a rooted migration history towards the country and who are, thus, more likely to have acquired Portuguese citizenship along the years.

Moreover, as of 2021 in the parish there were 3,939 people who have entered Portugal after 2010, constituting 8.50% of the population. Of those with recent migrant background, 26.20% were Portuguese nationals returning from a period of emigration abroad.

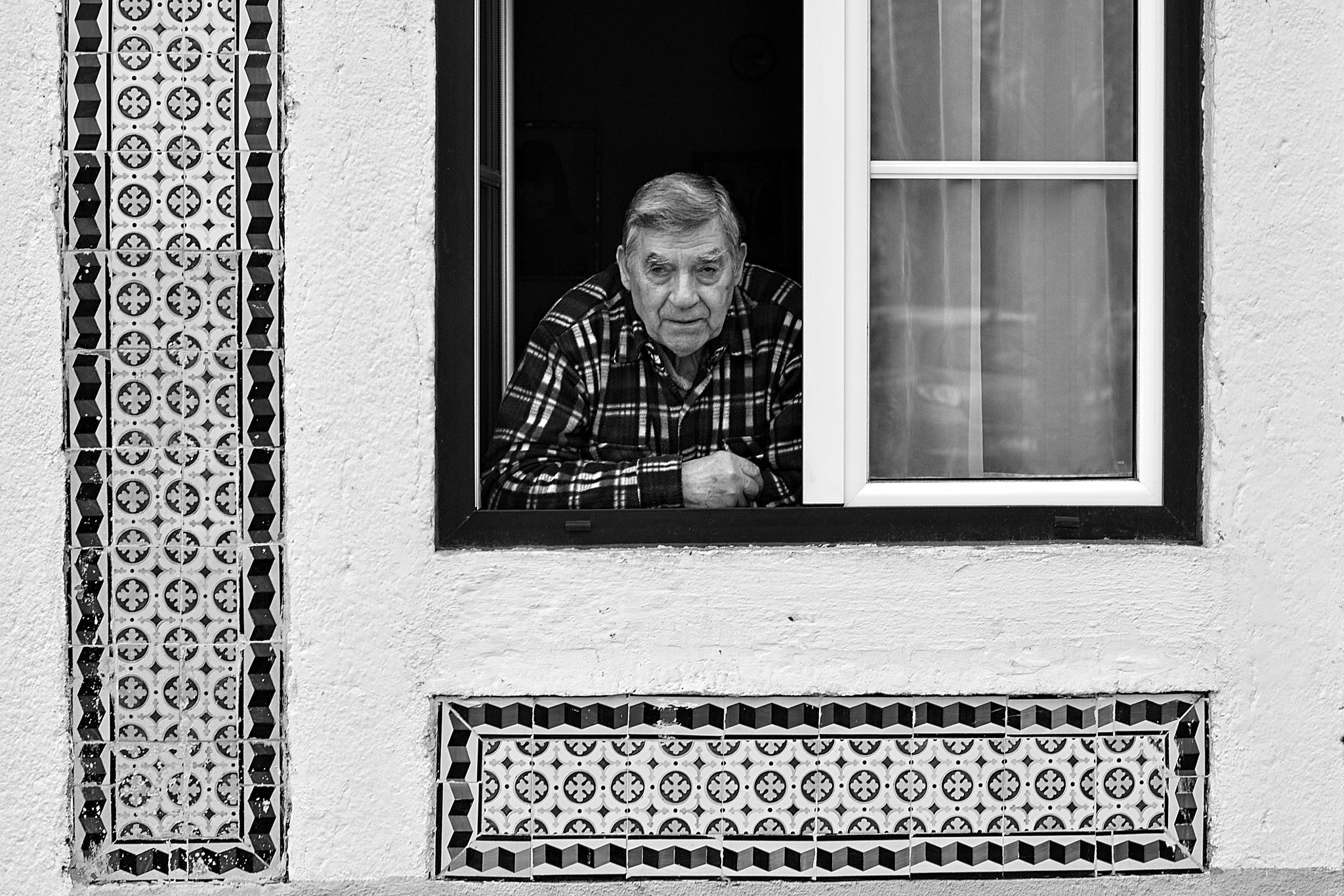
Elder in the parish of Lumiar. According to the 2021 Census, immigrants are younger than local residents.

Amongst the Portuguese, 5,474 had already lived abroad as of 2021 (12.54% of the Portuguese population). The majority of those having lived in Angola and Mozambique (2,651 people) entered Portugal in the Seventies (1,625 people or 61.30%), following the independence of the two former colonies (so called retornados). Those coming from countries hosting large Portuguese emigrant communities such as France, Spain, Germany, Switzerland, Luxembourg or Belgium (1,534 people) have mostly entered Portugal after 1991 (72.23%), probably due to the development of the Portuguese economy since its accession to the EU. Interestingly, 39.41% of the Portuguese nationals having lived in the UK and residing in the parish, has left the UK after 2016, (date of the Brexit referendum).

If the whole population (regardless of the nationality held) is taken into account, then 21.57% of the parish's population has already lived abroad for at least one year as of 2021, with PALOP countries, EU countries, Brazil the United Kingdom and China being the most commonly cited countries of previous residence.

== Economy and Social conditions ==
=== Employment ===
In the parish of Lumiar there are 1,370 residents who, as of 2021, were unemployed. Of these, 39.85% received a state-fund subsidy or pension (41.34% in Lisbon). In 2021 the unemployment rate in the parish is considerably lower than the one recorded for Lisbon and for Portugal as a whole, standing at 5.95%. In the same year, Portugal as a whole had an unemployment rate of 8.13% that has progressively decreased to 6.1% in 2023. As the statistics dealing with unemployment at the parish level are available only every 10 years, the current (2023) unemployment rate in Lumiar is unknown. Amongst youth aged 15–24 the unemployment rate in 2021 in the parish stood at 18.19%, 2.62% lower than in the rest of the country.

On the other hand, in 2021 21,651 residents were employed, of which 75.76% were employees and 21.42% were independent workers. Below is the table showing the employment rate per age group. The low share of people aged 20–24 employed is due to the fact that many are still in education (e.g. university) while the low proportion of those in employment aged 60–64 is due to many being early pensioners.

2021 Census data	Age group								
2021 Census data	20-24	25-29	30-34	35-39	40-44	45-49	50-54	55-59	60-64
Share of people in employment	29.67%	76.12%	82.43%	85.19%	85.54%	85.23%	81.63%	76.65%	62.22%

Dealing with commuting, the residents of Lumiar spent 21.48 minutes of daily commuting, 1 minute less than the average inhabitant of Lisbon.

=== Social conditions ===
Dealing with overcrowding in the parish's households, 4.30% of the population lives in accommodations where they have less than 15 m^{2} per capita (8.71% for Lisbon and 5.65% in Portugal as a whole), while 49.99% live in houses with more than 40 m^{2} per capita (39.64% for Lisbon and 46.84% in Portugal as a whole). There are 3,668.2 dwellings per km^{2} (3,200.5 for Lisbon and 64.9 in Portugal as a whole).

67.6% of the population lives in owned dwellings as of 2021; this is significantly higher than the value recorded for Lisbon (50.3%) and slightly lower than the one recorded for Portugal (70%). The average height of a residential building in Lumiar is 6.2 floors as of 2021 and the average area of a dwelling stands at 111.94 m^{2} (with the average in Lisbon-city 93.07 m^{2} being and in Portugal 112.45 m^{2}).

The average monthly rent value of leased dwellings recorded in 2021 stood at €512.04, 8.74% higher than the Lisbon average in the same year (€470.87). It is nonetheless important to notice that the value of the rents is quite low because of many contracts stipulated decades ago, with 28.17% (25.34% in Lisbon) of the dwellers paying less than €150/month because of the rent-freezing system that was adopted in Portugal in the late XX century, allowing that many people, now mostly elders, don't have to pay high rents. Due to the housing crisis and inflation, in 2023 the average rent for new contracts (frozen contracts aren't concerned) stood in fact at €12-€13/m^{2} in Lumiar, meaning that for the average 111.94 m^{2} dwelling are necessary around €1,399/month.

Dealing with housing prices, it is interesting to remark that if the median price per m^{2} stood at €1,993 for a house sold in early 2016, this value had risen to €2,748/m^{2} in early 2021 and to €3,483/m^{2} in 2023, experiencing a growth of +74.76% in just 7 years. In the same period the growth of house priced per m^{2} in Lisbon as a whole was +117.6%, from €1,875/m^{2} to €4,080/m^{2}.

Of the 1,900 residential buildings listed in the parish, 4.32% were built before 1919, 6.68% from 1919 to 1960, 44.95% from 1961 to 1990, 20.53% from 1991 to 2000 and 23.53% after 2001. Of the buildings built before 1919 97.56% had 1 to 3 floors, while in buildings built between 1981 and 2010 the proportion of buildings with 6 stories or more is 72.18%. Interestingly, the newer and higher the building the higher the probability of it being served by an elevator. For homes built before 1946, only 0.81% have access to an elevator as of 2021; this percentage ascends to 82.65% for buildings dating from 1981 to 2010. Always with regard to amenities, 30.35% of the houses had access to air conditioning (20.98% in Lisbon), 79.23% to heating (69.62% in Lisbon) and 64.44% to a parking place (28.04% in Lisbon).

As of 2021 there were 2,030 vacant dwelling in the parish. Of the vacant dwellings, 887 are vacant for rental or with the purpose of being sold, while 1,143 are vacant for other reasons, often abandoned, awaiting their demolition or because a reason for conflict among heirs. Moreover, as of 2023 106 apartments are registered as "Alojamento Local", meaning they have the license to be rent on platforms such as Booking.com or Airbnb.

In the parish were also recorded 8 homeless people, of which 7 (87.5%) were males. The parish is thus actively promoting initiatives aiming at helping people in situation of permanent of temporal homelessness.

== Landmarks ==
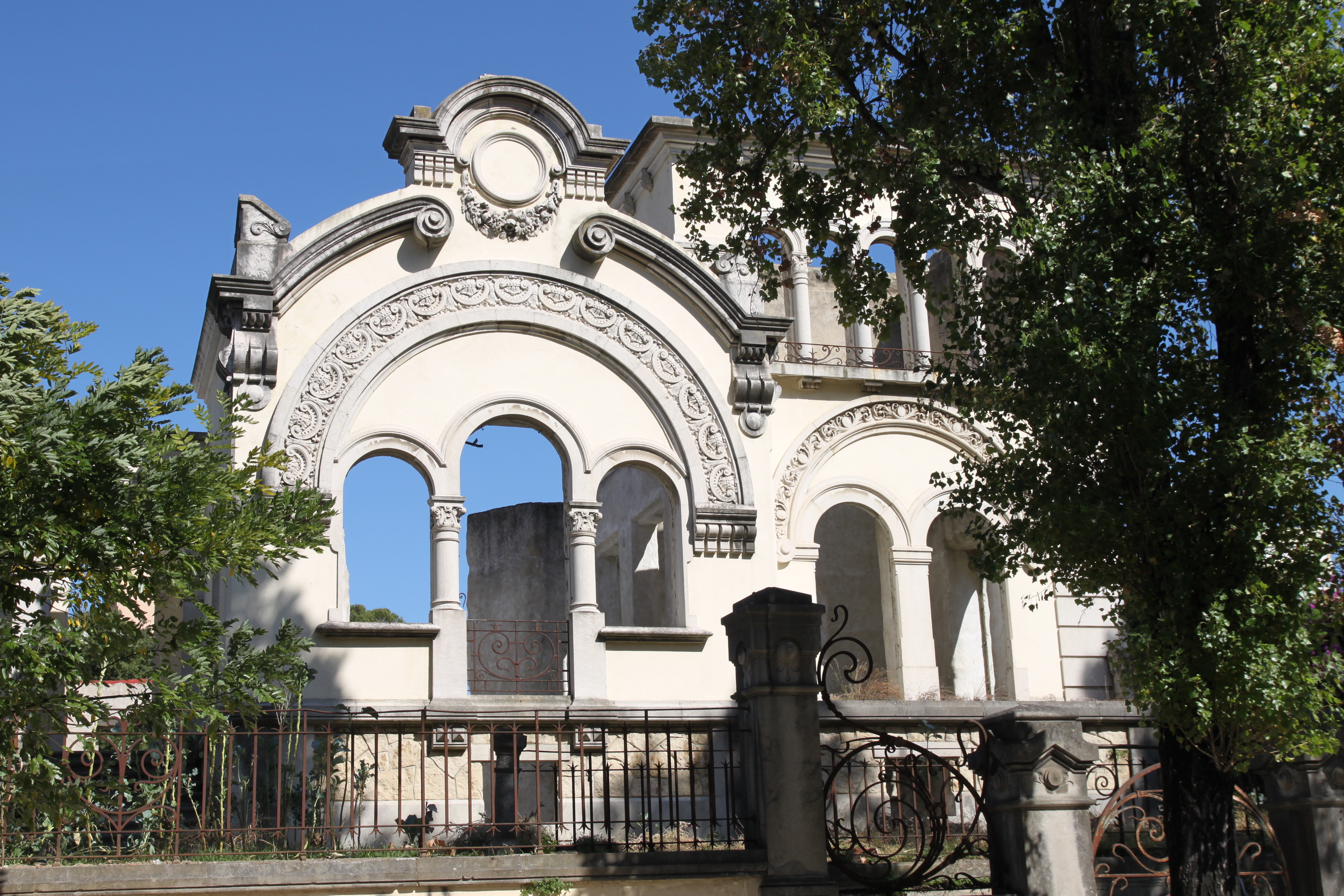
Villa in Alameda das Torres

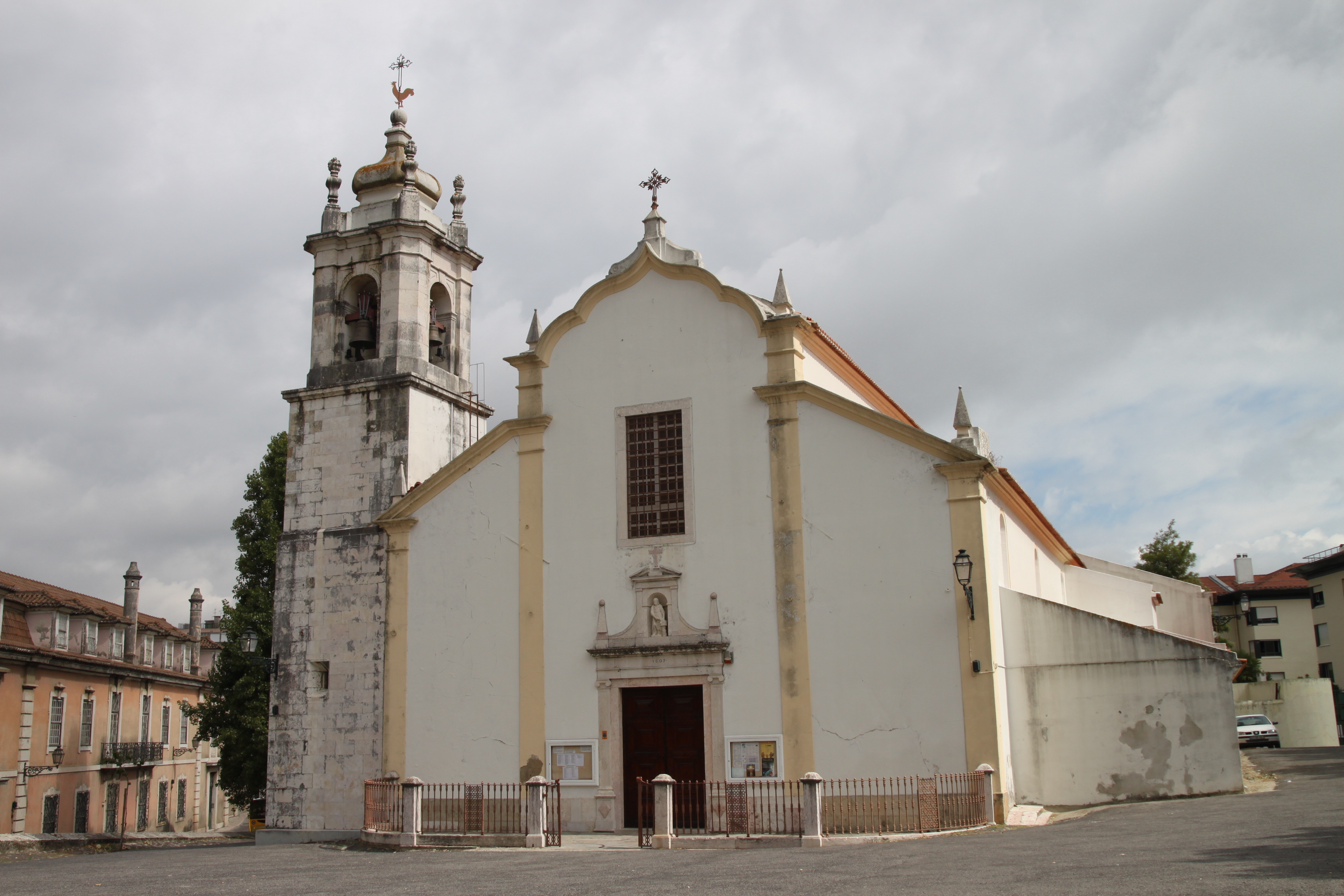
Saint John the Baptist church

Local landmarks and interesting places include one of the biggest public greenspace/urban parks in the city Quinta das Conchas e dos Lilases, the Paço do Lumiar, and several old palaces are also scattered throughout the neighbourhood.

- José Alvalade Stadium (home of Sporting Portugal)
- National Museum of Costume
- Colégio de Santa Doroteia
- Conjunto do Paço do Lumiar, or ancient palaces of Lumiar: composed by Quinta dos Azulejos, Quinta das Hortênsias, Quinta do Marquês de Angeja, Palácio do Monteiro-Mor
  - Palácio do Monteiro-Mor
  - Quinta Alegre
  - Quinta dos Azulejos
- Igreja de São João Baptista
- Igreja e Convento de Santa Brígida
- Igreja e Convento de Nossa Senhora das Portas do Céu
- Igreja matriz do Lumiar
- Monteiro-Mor Park
- National Theatre and Dance Museum
- Quinta da Musgueira
- Villa Sousa, 1912 Valmor Prize winner (Prémio Valmor), designed by Manuel Joaquim Norte Júnior
- Tobis Portuguesa S.A.

== Culture ==
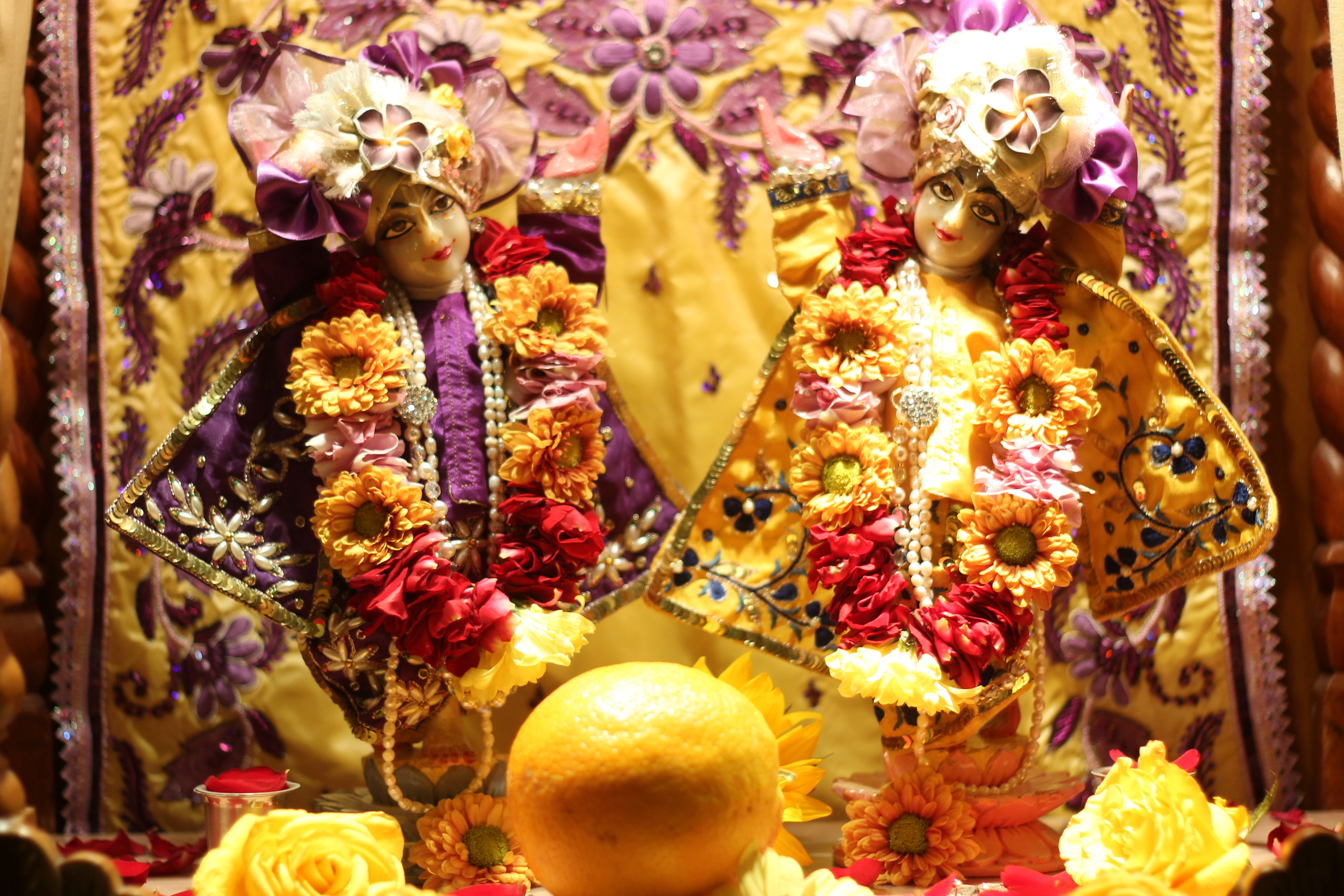
Gaura Nitai Deities, ISKCON Lisbon

The parish hosts numerous cultural institutions, such as Orlando Ribeiro Municipal Library. Other notable institutions include:

- Associação Juvenil IGNISTUNA - Tuna Académica do Lumiar
- Academia Musical 1.º de Junho
- Academia Musical Joaquim Xavier Pinheiro
- Academia União Familiar de Telheiras
- Académico Clube de Ciências
- Associação de Cultura e Recreio da Musgueira Norte.
- Associação Popular do Lumiar
- Associação de Residentes de Telheiras
- Associação Sociocultural "A Festa"
- Associação Sociocultural Recreativa e Desportiva da Mugueira Sul
- Atlético Clube da Musgueira Sul
- Associação de Moradores do bairro da Cruz Vermelha no Lumiar
- Comunidade Hindu (lit. Hindu community)

== Sports ==
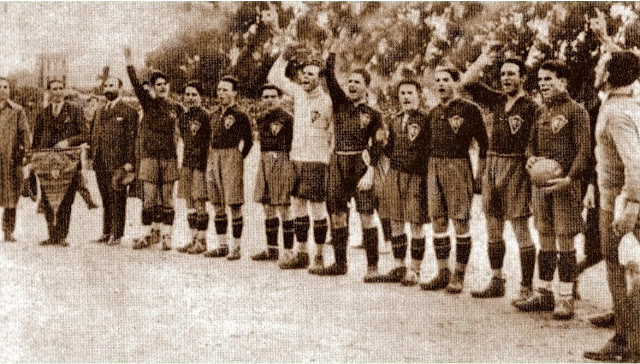
Spain national football team before the friendly match against Portugal in Lumiar, May 1925

The freguesia is home to Academia do Lumiar, a basketball team of the Proliga (Portugal).

Other sports institutions include:

- Sporting Clube de Portugal (one of the largest and most prestigious sports clubs in the history of Portuguese sports)
- Grupo Desportivo e Recreativo Tunelense e Grupo Recreativo
- Grupo Recreativo e Desportivo Bairro da Cruz Vermelha
- Grupo Desportivo das Calvanas
- Clube Ténis Paço Lumiar
- Centro Cultural Quinta de Nossa Senhora da Luz

== Health ==
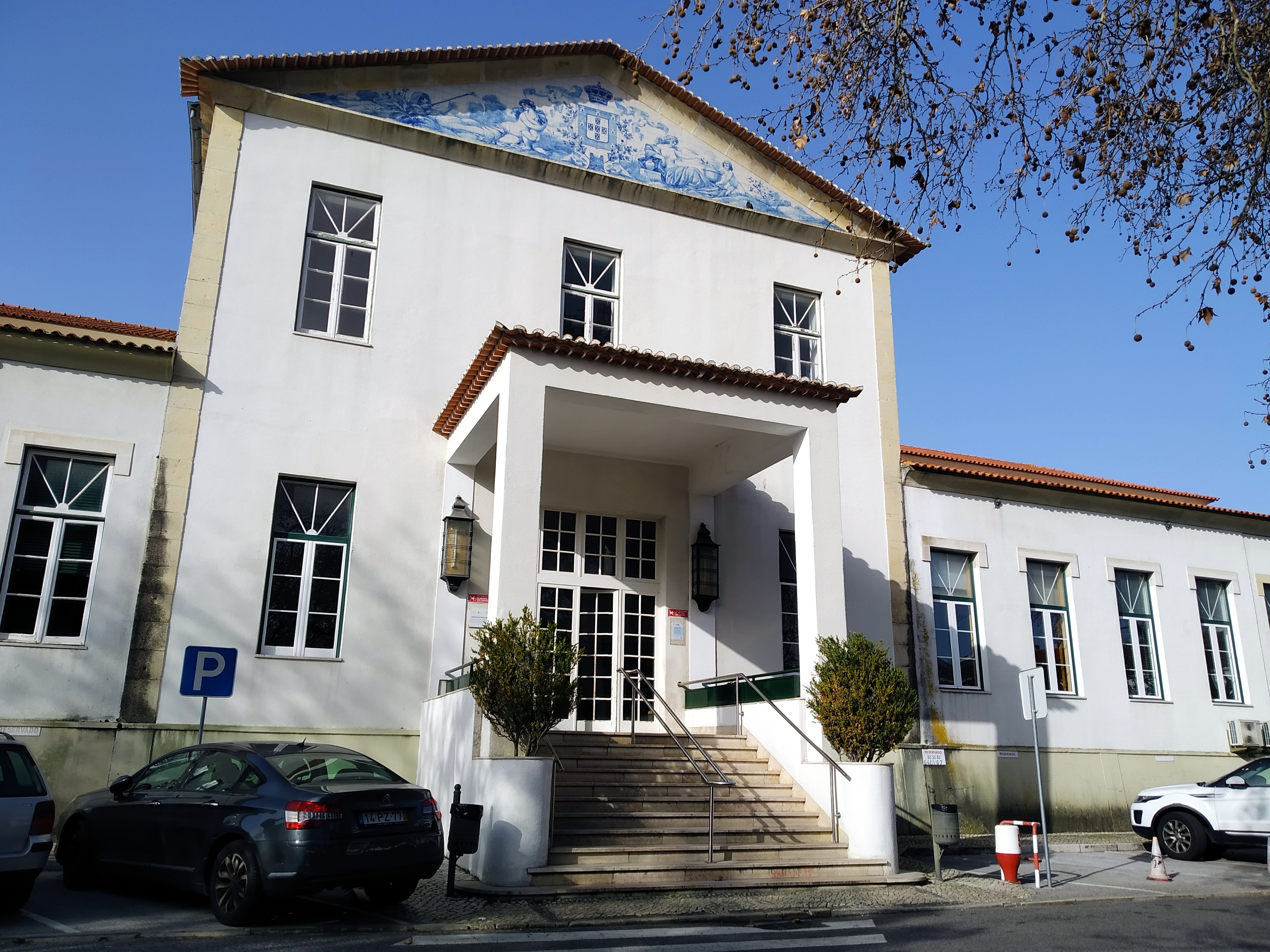
Pulido Valente hospital

The parish is served by numerous hospitals, pharmacies and health centers.Examples of these facilities are, for instance:

- Hospital da Força Aérea (lit. air force hospital)
- Pulido Valente Hospital
- Lumiar Health Center
- Clínica CUF Alvalade
- USF Alta de Lisboa
- Centro de Medicina Subaquática e Hiperbárica (military hospital)
- Campus de Saúde Militar (military hospital)

There are also numerous associations headquartered in the parish that deal with health, such as Sociedade Portuguesa Medicina Interna (Portuguese medical society)

== Gardens and parks ==
The parish's largest public park is undoubtedly Quinta das Conchas e dos Lilases

== Transportation ==
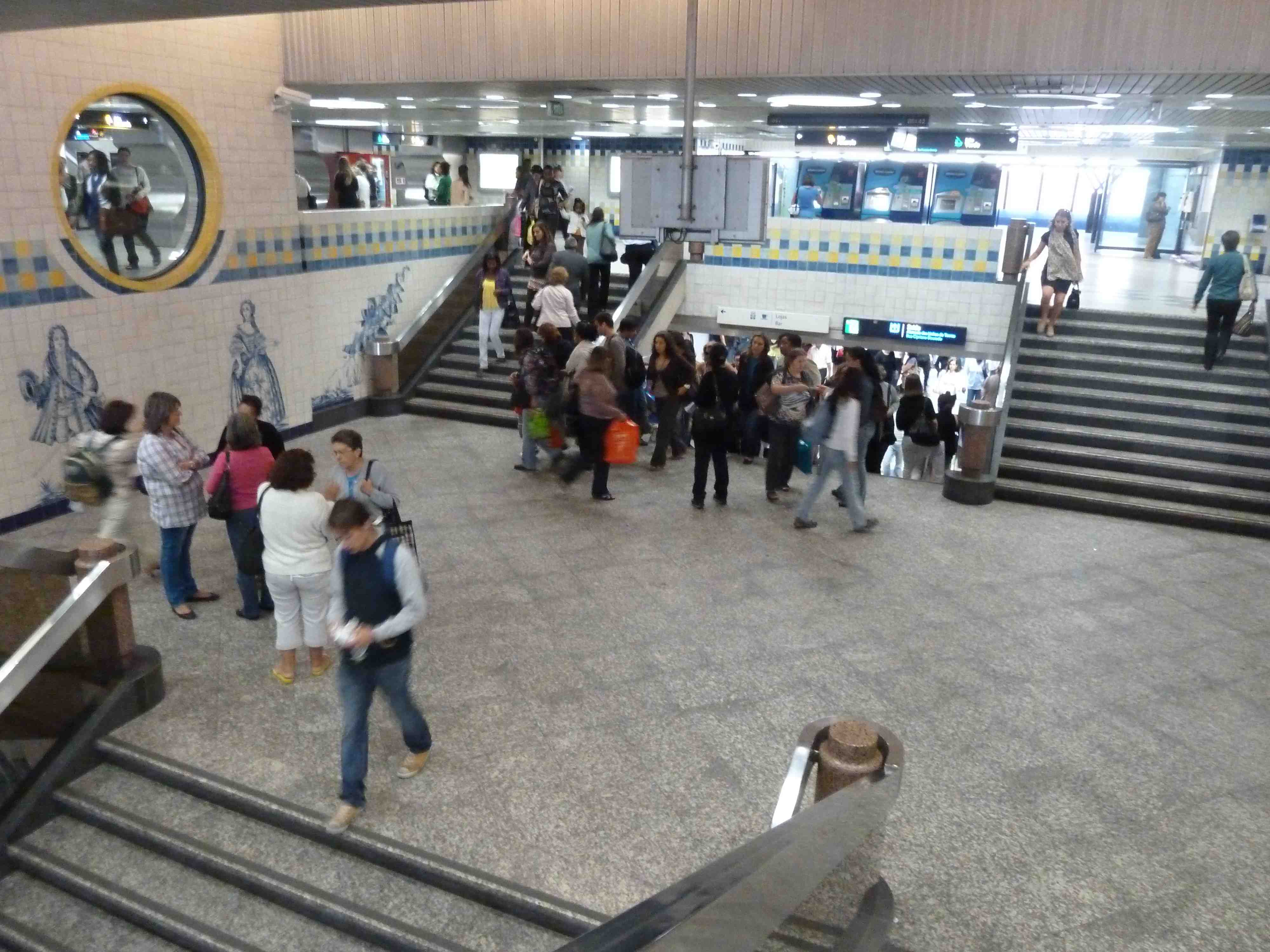
Campo Grande station

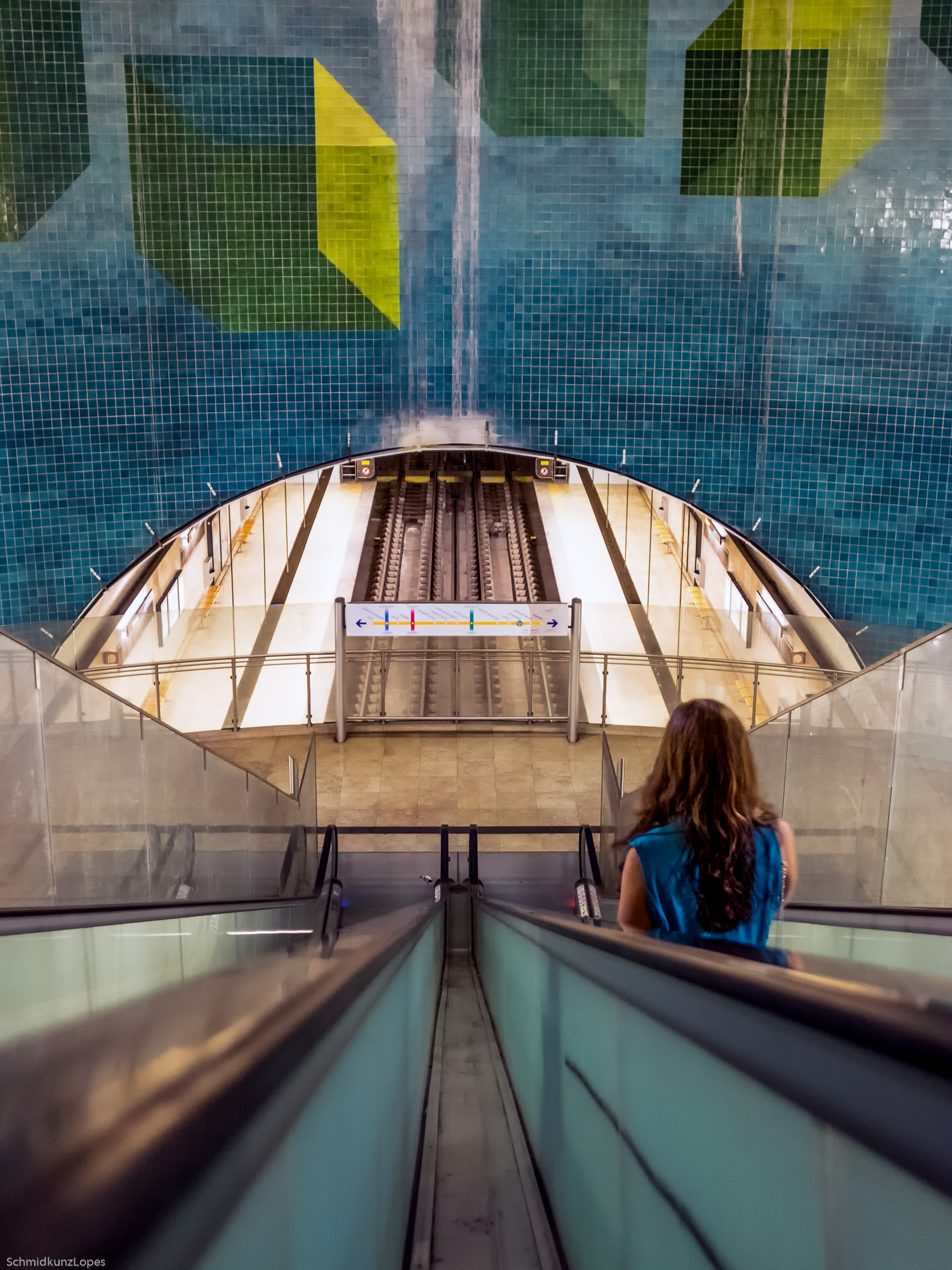
Campo grande station

Lumiar is well connected by public transport. The Campo Grande interchange is one of the main transfer centers between public transport, with several metro, bus, tram and taxi lines.

=== Metro ===
The parish can be accessed through the following metro lines and stations:

- Lisbon Metro Green Line (Linha verde)
  - Telheiras
  - Campo Grande
- Lisbon Metro Yellow Line (Linha amarela)
  - Lumiar
  - Quinta das Conchas
  - Campo Grande

=== Bus ===
Urban bus services are carried out by the municipal company Carris

=== Air ===
The parish is delimited on its eastern side by Lisbon airport facilities

== Politics ==
=== Presidential elections ===
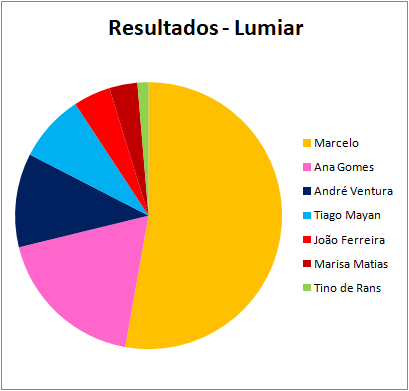
Results of the 2021 presidential elections in Lumiar

Summary of the 18 January 2026 & 8 February 2026 Portuguese presidential election results
Candidates	Supporting parties	First round		Second round	
Candidates	Supporting parties	Votes	%	Votes	%
António José Seguro	Socialist Party, Volt Portugal	10,000	34.18	20,737	80.35
João Cotrim de Figueiredo	Liberal Initiative	8,398	28.70		
Henrique Gouveia e Melo	People's Monarchist Party	3,159	10.80		
Luís Marques Mendes	Social Democratic Party, CDS – People's Party	3,086	10.55		
André Ventura	Chega	3,028	10.35	5,070	19.65
Catarina Martins	Left Bloc	514	1.76		
António Filipe	Portuguese Communist Party, Ecologist Party "The Greens"	501	1.71		
Manuel João Vieira	Independent	373	1.27		
Jorge Pinto	LIVRE	159	0.54		
André Pestana	Socialist Alternative Movement	30	0.10		
Humberto Correia	Independent	12	0.04		
Total valid		29,260	100.00	25,807	100.00
Invalid ballots		425	1.43	2,022	7.26
Registered voters/turnout		39,701	74.77	39,701	70.10
Source: Comissão Nacional de Eleições

=== Legislative elections ===
Election	%	%	%	%	%	%	%	%	%	%	%	%	%	%	%	%	%	%	%	%	%
Election	PS	PPD / PSD	BE	PCP / PEV	IL	PAN	L	A	CH	PCTP / MRPP	ADN	R.I.R.	NC	PNR / E	MPT	PURP	PPM	PDR	MAS	PTP	VP
2019	22.60	30.68	7.70	6.82	5.35	5.22	3.68	3.00	1.68	1.25	0.40	-	0.27	0.25	0.25	0.19	0.17	0.11	0.09	0.05	-
2021	18.30	33.67	3.64	2.55	3.52	13.31	1.72	3.88	0.05	4.72	0.21	0.20	0.19	0.05	0.05	0.08	-	-	-	0.09	0.16
Source: Comissão Nacional de Eleições

=== Local elections ===
Election	%	M	%	M	%	M	%	M	%	M	%	M	%	M
Election	PPD/PSD.CDS-PP.A.MPT.PPM		PS.L		PCP-PEV		IL		BE		CH		PAN	
2021	41.34	9	27.09	6	8.67	1	6.60	1	5.19	1	4.61	1	3.18	-
Source: Comissão Nacional de Eleições

== Streets ==
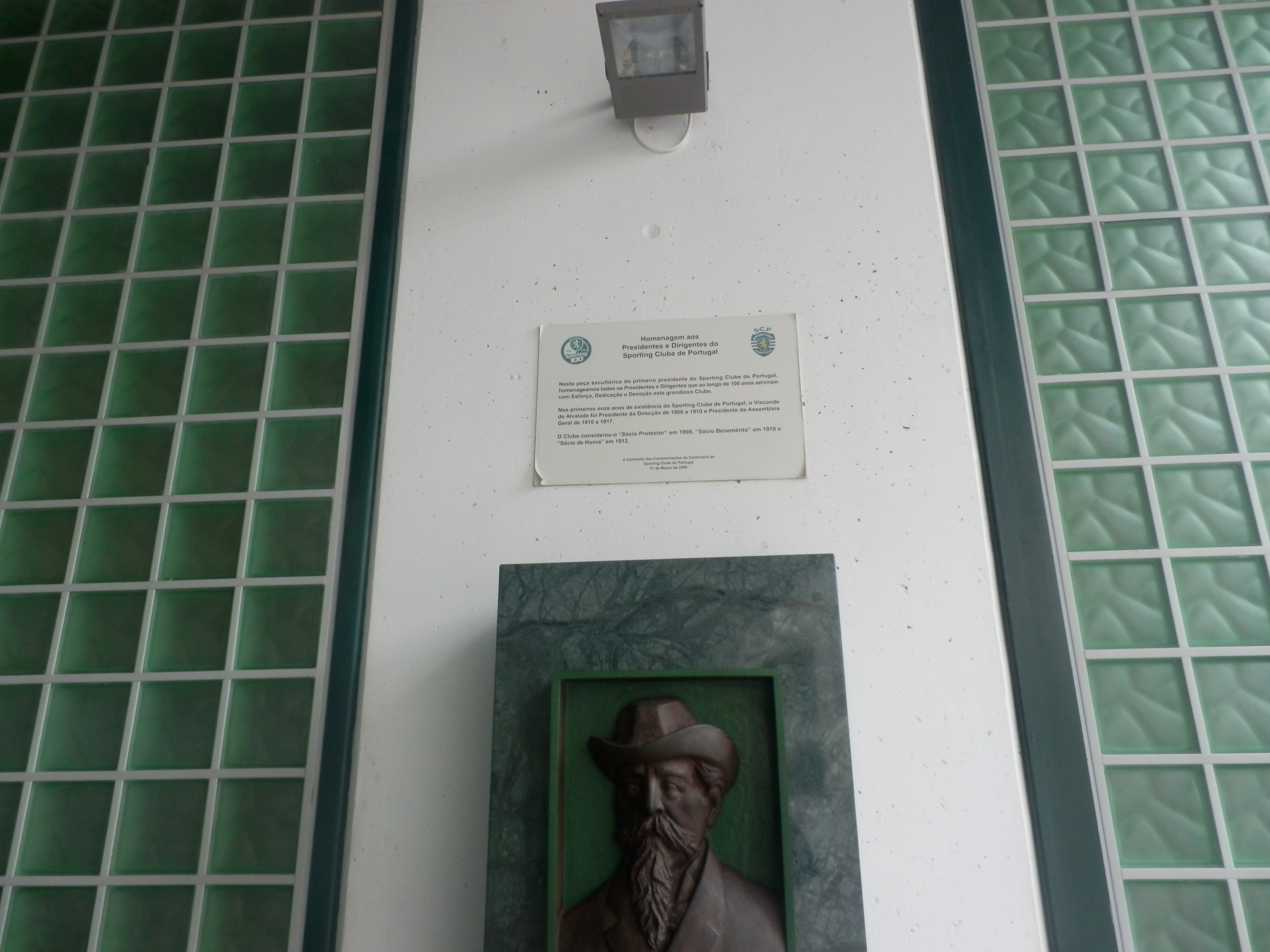
Alvalade stadium entrance

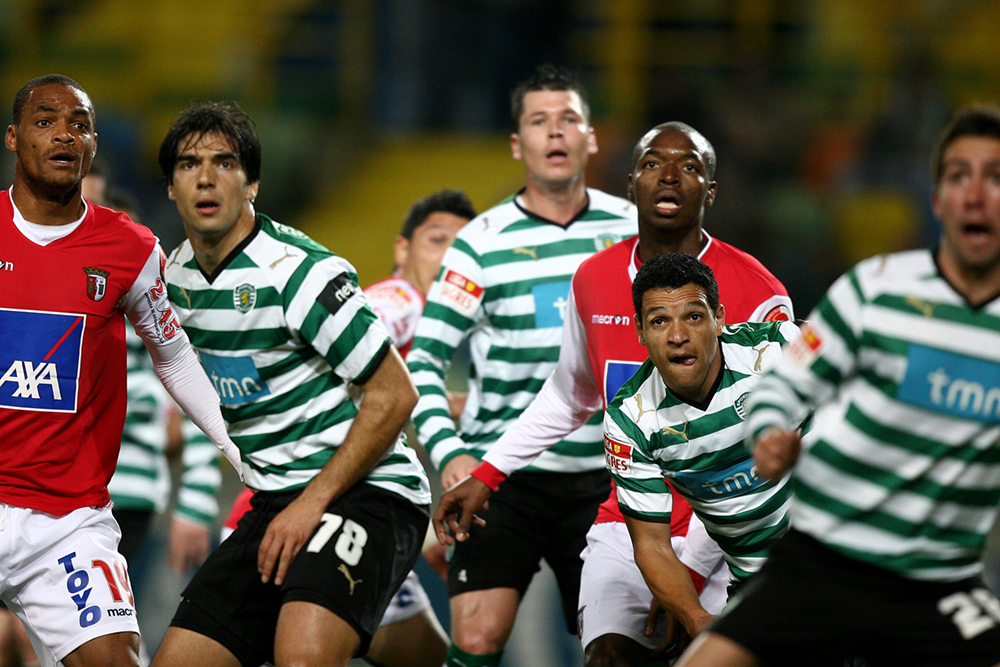
Sporting Clube de Portugal vs Sporting Clube de Braga football match at Alvalade stadium

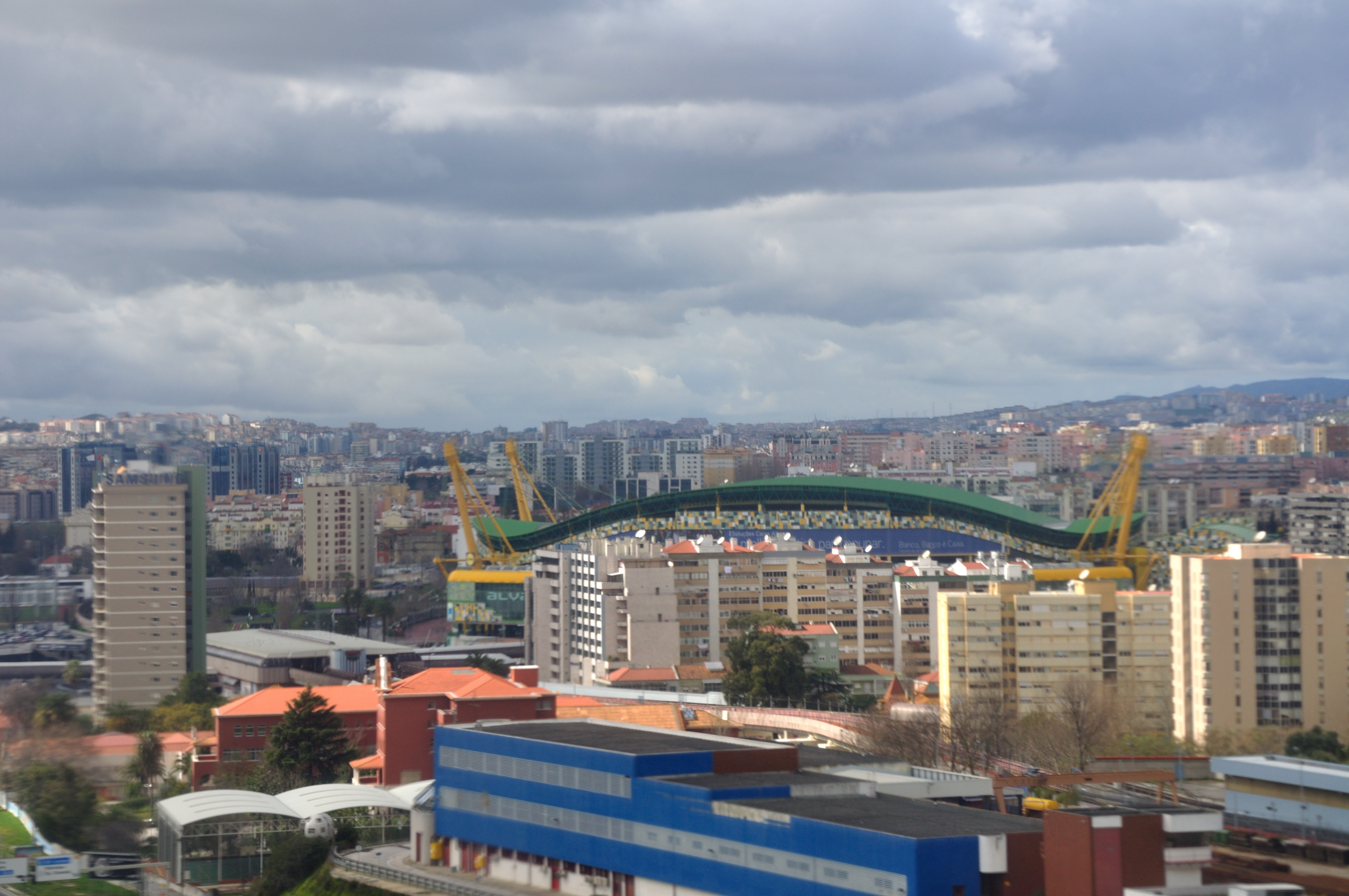
Alvalade stadium view

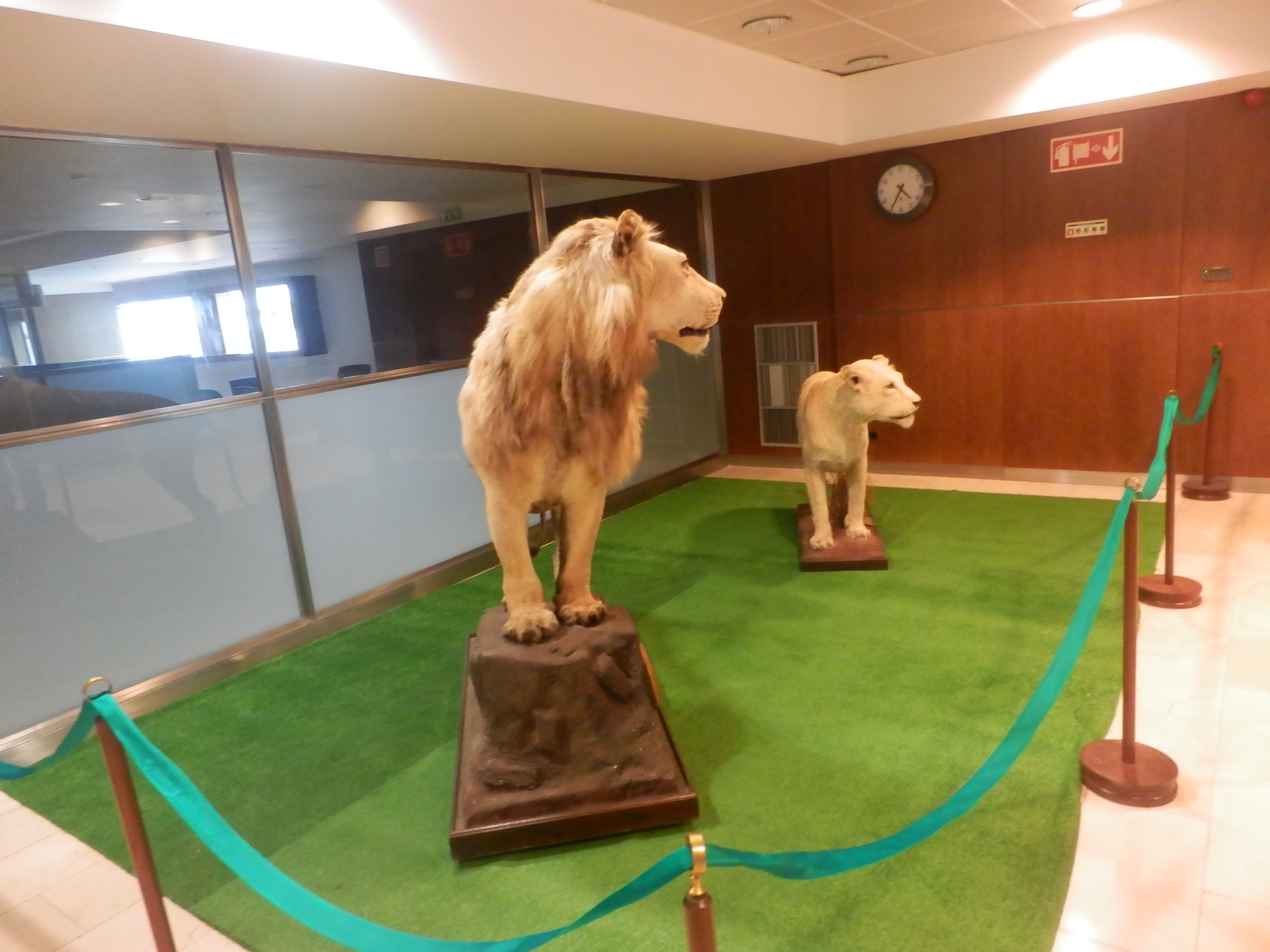
Lions, epitome of Sporting clube

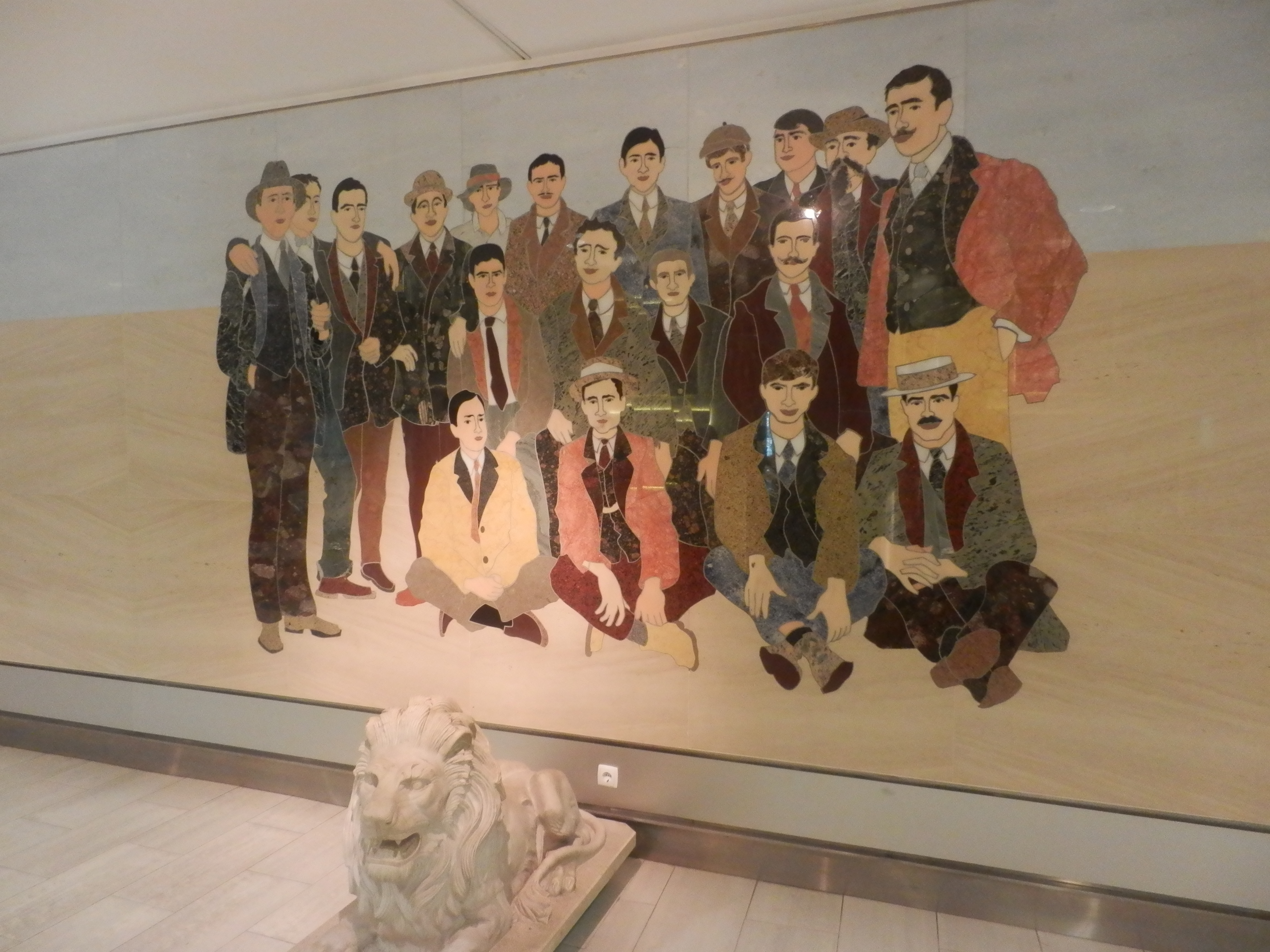
Founders portrait at Estádio Alvalade

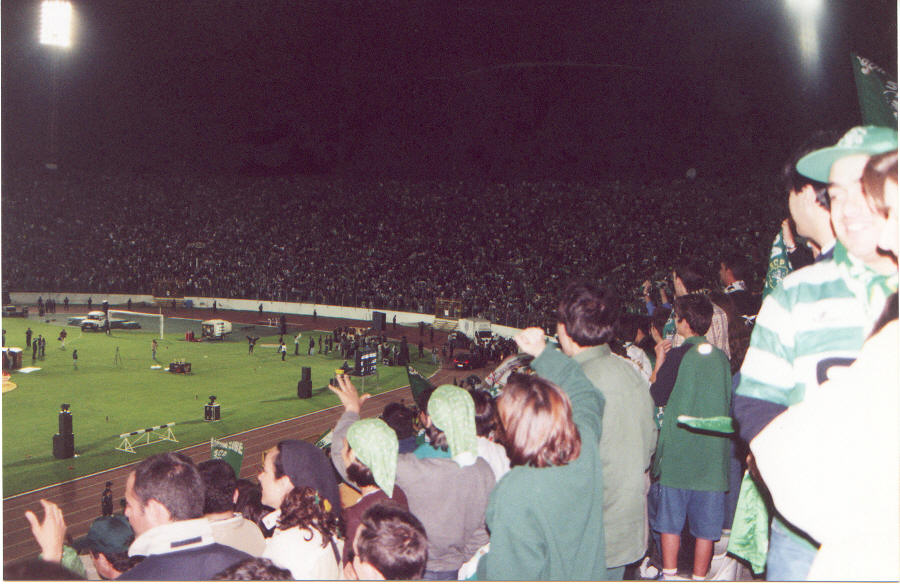
Match at the old Alvalade stadium (demolished in 2003)

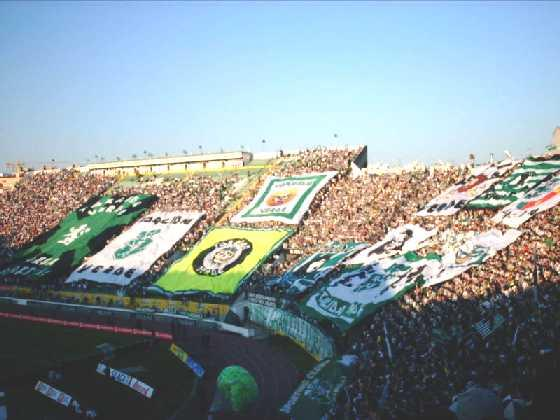
Match at the old Alvalade stadium (demolished in 2003)

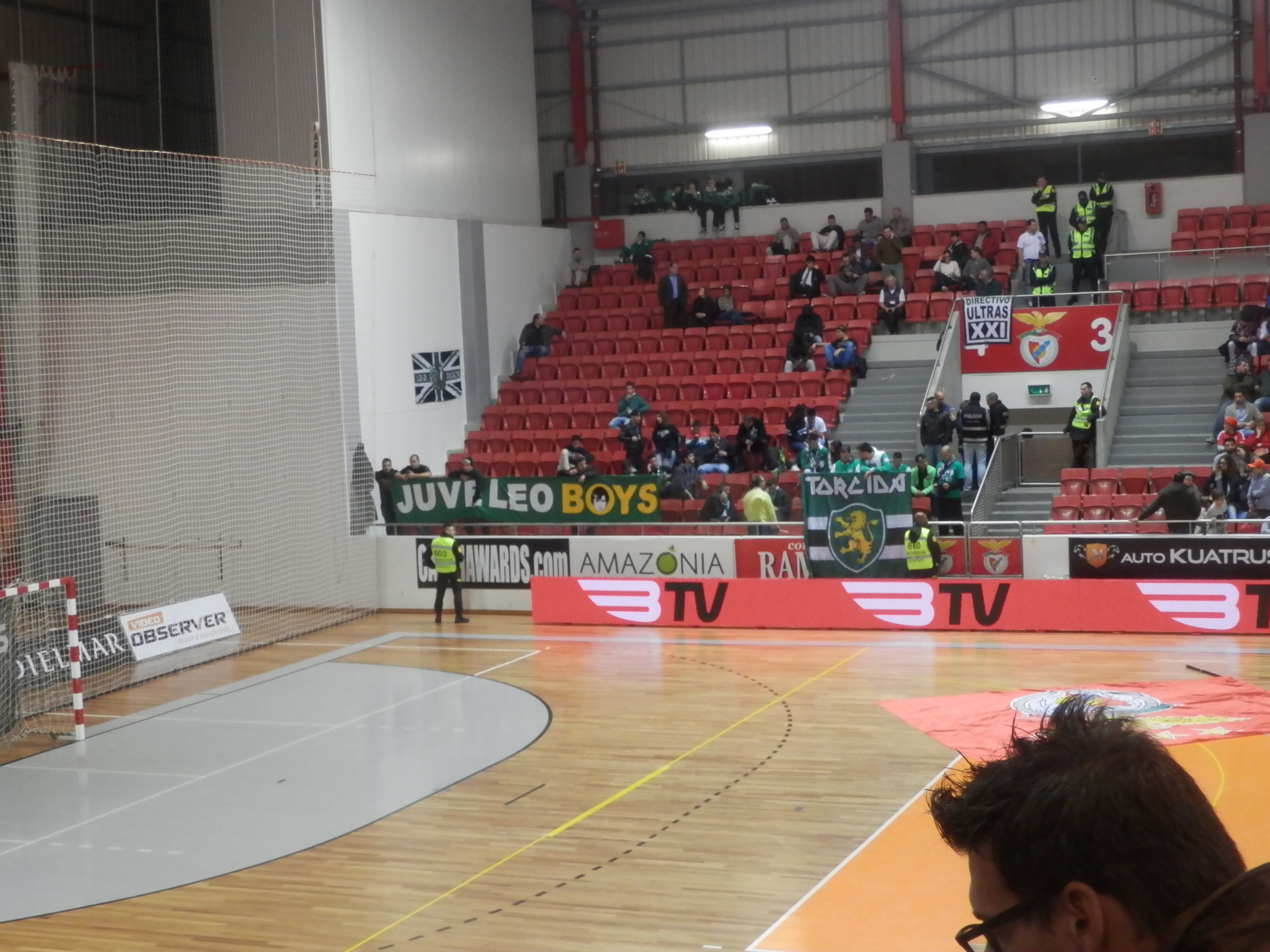
Juve Leo banner

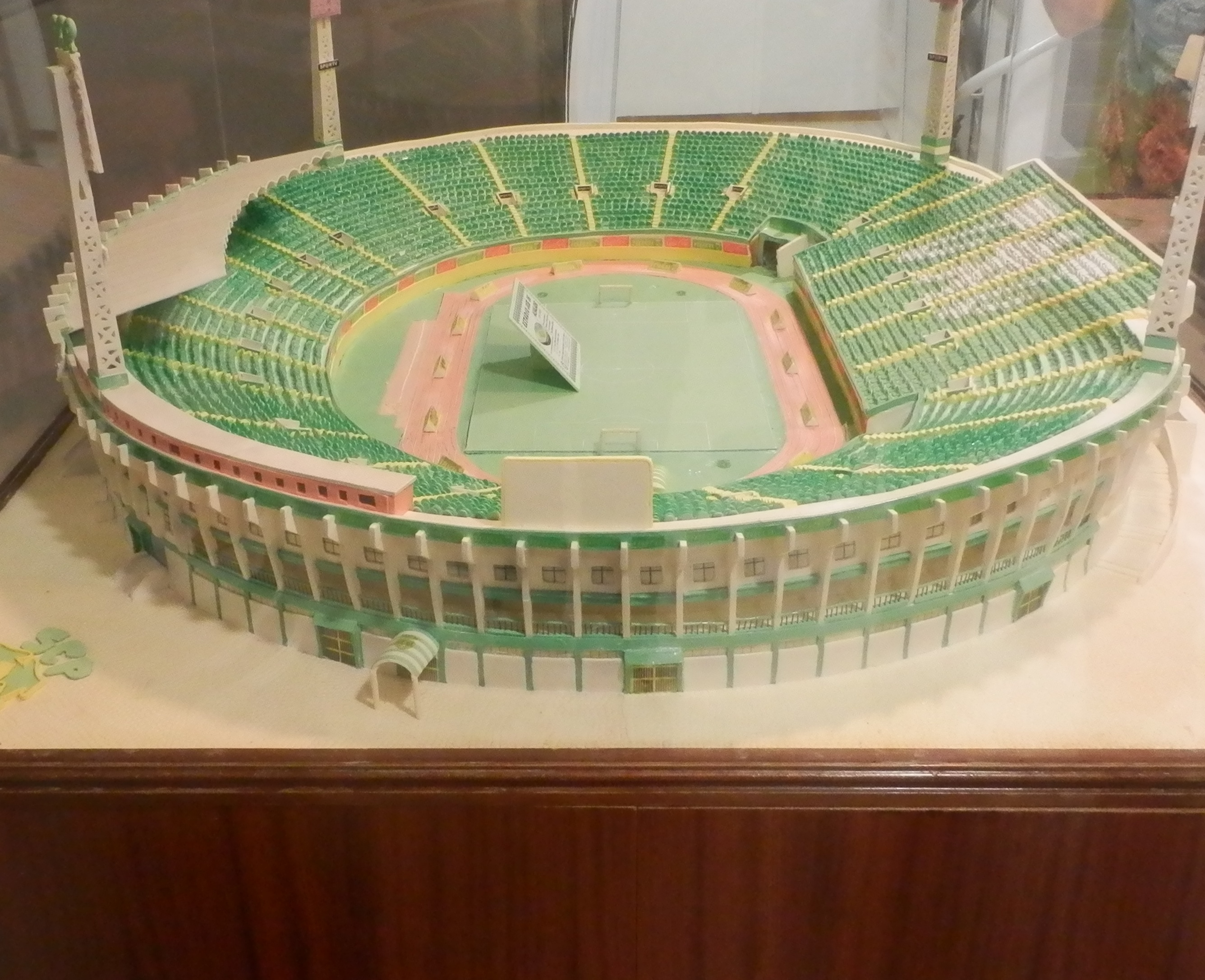
Sugar model of the old Estádio de Alvalade at the new Estádio Alvalade

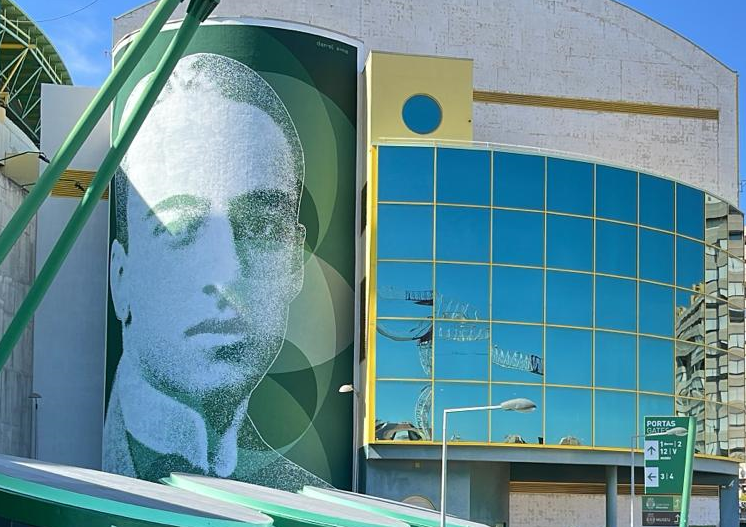
José Alvalade facade at Estádio José Alvalade

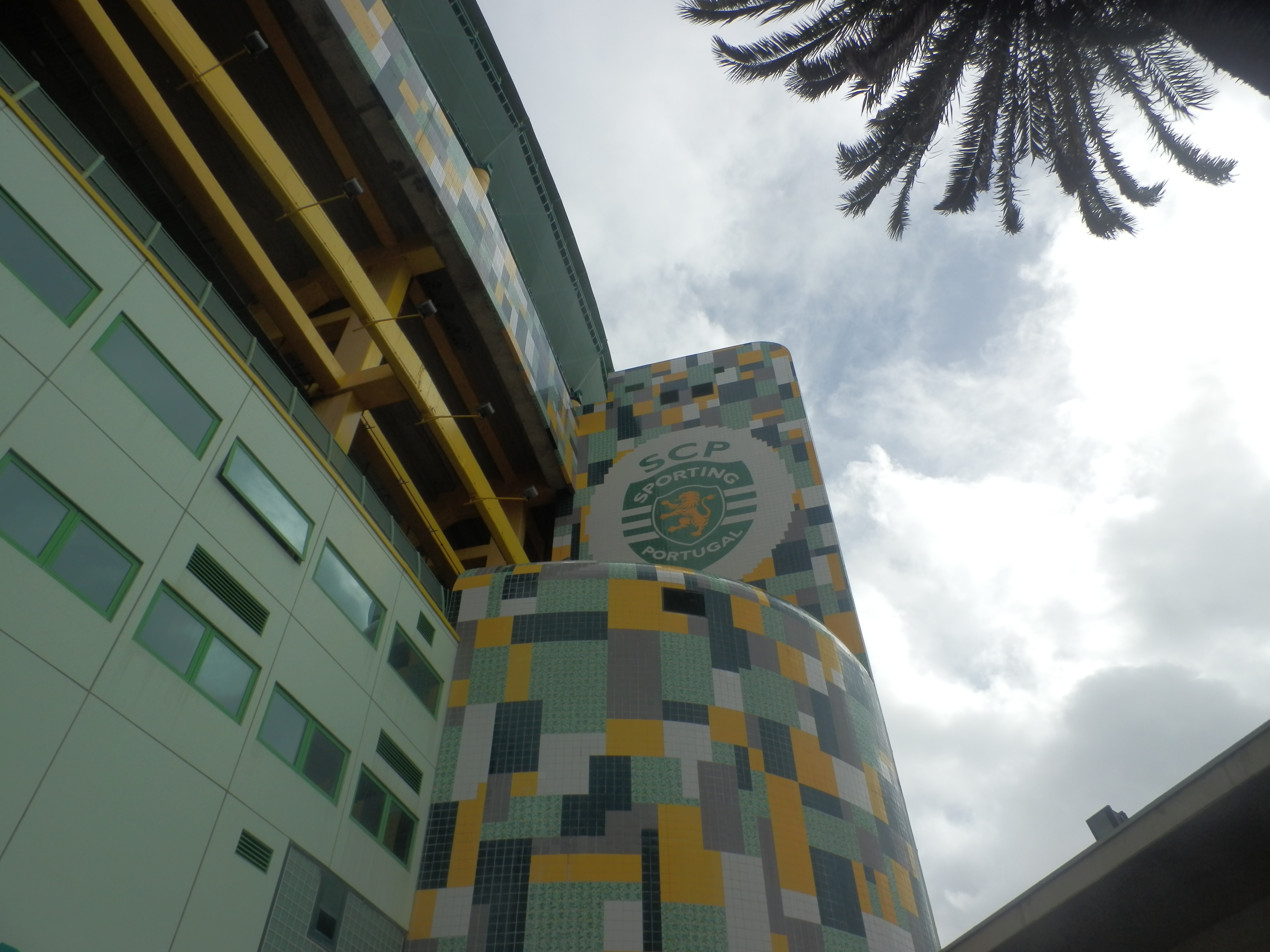
Street view of Sporting CP logo

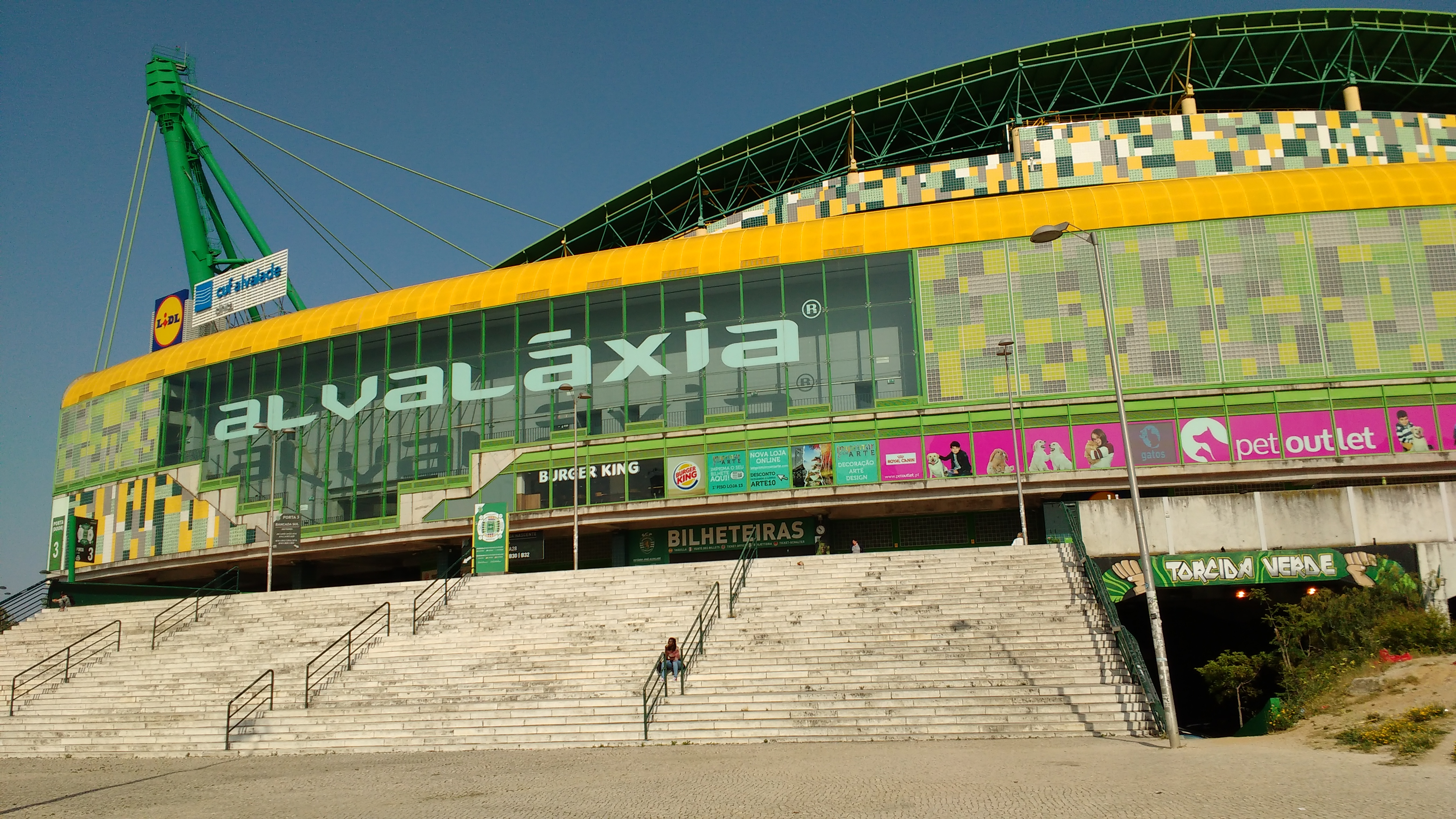
Alvaláxia shopping centre at Alvalade stadium

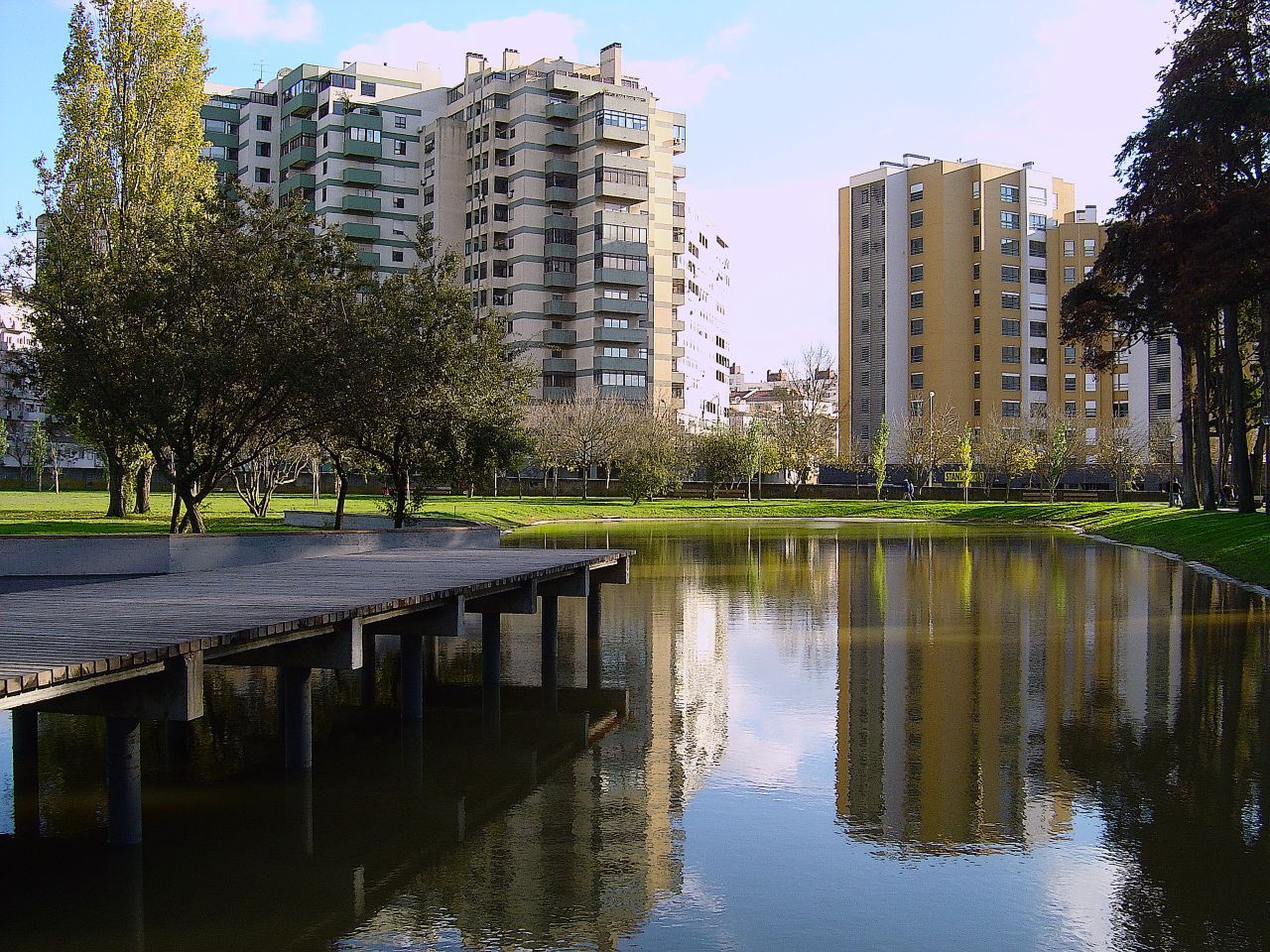
Artificial lake in Quinta das Conchas park

The parish has 249 streets administered by the city council. They are:

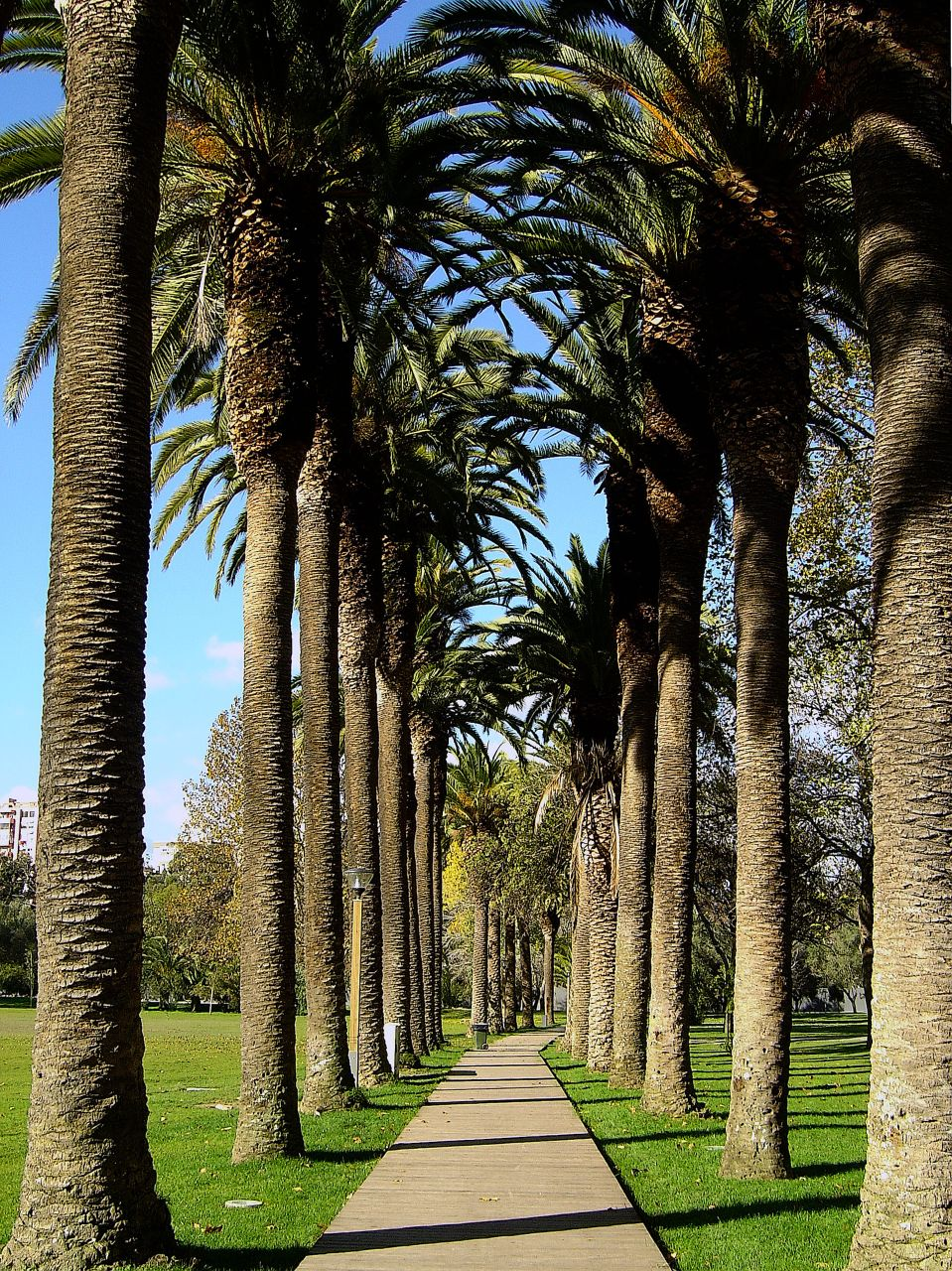
Quinta das Conchas

- Alameda da Música
- Alameda da Quinta de Santo António
- Alameda das Linhas de Torres
- Alameda Mahatma Gandhi
- Alameda Roentgen
- Avenida Álvaro Cunhal
- Avenida Carlos Paredes
- Avenida das Nações Unidas
- Avenida David Mourão-Ferreira
- Avenida Eugénio de Andrade
- Avenida General Norton de Matos
- Avenida Marechal Craveiro Lopes
- Avenida Maria Helena Vieira da Silva
- Avenida Nuno Krus Abecasis
- Avenida Rainha Dona Amélia
- Avenida Rainha Dona Leonor
- Avenida Santos e Castro
- Avenida Ventura Terra
- Azinhaga da Cidade
- Azinhaga da Fonte Velha
- Azinhaga da Musgueira
- Azinhaga da Torre do Fato
- Azinhaga das Galhardas
- Azinhaga das Lajes
- Azinhaga das Travessas
- Azinhaga de Entremuros
- Azinhaga do Frade
- Azinhaga do Jogo da Bola
- Azinhaga do Poço de Baixo
- Azinhaga do Porto
- Azinhaga dos Lameiros
- Azinhaga dos Ulmeiros
- Calçada de Carriche
- Calçada do Picadeiro
- Calçada do Poço
- Campo Grande
- Estrada da Ameixoeira
- Estrada da Torre
- Estrada de Telheiras
- Estrada do Desvio
- Estrada do Lumiar
- Estrada do Paço do Lumiar
- Jardim Prof. António de Sousa Franco
- Jardim Prof. Francisco Caldeira Cabral
- Largo D. João, Príncipe de Cândia
- Largo das Conchas
- Largo de São João Baptista
- Largo de São João da Mata
- Largo de São Sebastião
- Largo do Paço
- Largo do Poço
- Largo Gérard Castello-Lopes
- Largo Júlio de Castilho
- Largo Luís Chaves
- Largo Michel'Angelo Lambertini
- Largo Padre Augusto Gomes Pinheiro
- Largo República da Turquia
- Largo Willy Brandt
- Passeio Artur Agostinho
- Praça Bernardino Machado
- Praça Prof. Rodrigues Lapa
- Praça Rainha Dona Filipa
- Praça Rainha Santa
- Praceta da Quinta do Guarda-Mor
- Praceta Prof. António José Saraiva
- Praceta Professor Gonçalves Ferreira
- Praceta Professor José Conde
- Rotunda António Dias Lourenço
- Rotunda Coronel Vítor Alves
- Rotunda Nelson Mandela
- Rotunda Visconde de Alvalade
- Rua Abel Salazar
- Rua Actor António Silva
- Rua Actor Epifânio
- Rua Adriana de Vecchi
- Rua Agostinho Neto
- Rua Aldo Moro
- Rua Alexandre Cabral
- Rua Alexandre Ferreira
- Rua Alfredo Trindade
- Rua Amarelhe
- Rua Amílcar Cabral
- Rua André de Gouveia
- Rua António Champalimaud
- Rua António do Couto
- Rua António Livramento
- Rua António Lopes Ribeiro
- Rua António Quadros
- Rua António Stromp
- Rua Aristides de Sousa Mendes
- Rua Arminda Correia
- Rua Armindo Rodrigues
- Rua Arnaldo Ferreira
- Rua Belo Marques
- Rua Brito Camacho
- Rua Carvalhão Duarte
- Rua César de Oliveira
- Rua Cipriano Dourado
- Rua Comandante Fontoura da Costa
- Rua Cordeiro Ferreira
- Rua da Castiça
- Rua da Quinta das Conchas
- Rua da Quinta dos Frades
- Rua da República do Paraguai
- Rua da Tobis Portuguesa
- Rua Daciano Costa
- Rua Daniel Santa Rita
- Rua das Murtas
- Rua de São Bento Menni
- Rua Direita ao Lumiar
- Rua do Alqueidão
- Rua do Alto dos Alcoutins
- Rua do Lumiar
- Rua do Rio Zêzere
- Rua Dr. Henrique Martins Gomes
- Rua Duarte Vidal
- Rua Eduardo Covas
- Rua Embaixador Martins Janeira
- Rua Enrico Berlinguer
- Rua Ernesto Costa
- Rua Esquerda
- Rua Fernando Curado Ribeiro
- Rua Fernando Lopes
- Rua Fernando Lopes Graça
- Rua Fernando Namora
- Rua Fernando Vaz
- Rua Ferrer Trindade
- Rua Filipe Duarte
- Rua Formosinho Sanchez
- Rua Francine Benoit
- Rua Francisco da Conceição Silva
- Rua Francisco Stromp
- Rua Frederico George
- Rua Garcia de Resende
- Rua General Vasco Gonçalves
- Rua Helena Vaz da Silva
- Rua Hermano Neves
- Rua Hermínio Monteiro
- Rua Irisalva Moita
- Rua Isaac Rabin
- Rua Isabel Magalhães Colaço
- Rua Jaime Lopes Dias
- Rua Joaquim Agostinho
- Rua Joaquim Rodrigo
- Rua Jorge Segurado
- Rua José Cardoso Pires
- Rua José da Costa Pedreira
- Rua José de Mello e Castro
- Rua José Escada
- Rua José Galhardo
- Rua José Pedro Machado
- Rua José Pontes
- Rua José Travassos
- Rua Konrad Adenauer
- Rua Ladislau Patrício
- Rua Leopoldo de Almeida
- Rua Luís de Freitas Branco
- Rua Luís Pastor de Macedo
- Rua Luís Piçarra
- Rua Manuel Costa e Silva
- Rua Manuel da Silva
- Rua Manuel Guimarães
- Rua Manuel Marques
- Rua Maria Albertina
- Rua Maria Alice
- Rua Maria Carlota
- Rua Maria do Carmo Torres
- Rua Maria José da Guia
- Rua Maria José Estanco
- Rua Maria Margarida
- Rua Mário Castrim
- Rua Mário Dionísio
- Rua Mário Eloy
- Rua Mário Sampaio Ribeiro
- Rua Maurício de Vasconcelos
- Rua Nóbrega e Sousa
- Rua Padre Manuel Antunes
- Rua Pedro Bandeira
- Rua Pedro Bandeira Freire
- Rua Pedro de Queirós Pereira
- Rua Pena Monteiro
- Rua Poeta Bocage
- Rua Prof. Aires de Sousa
- Rua Prof. Alfredo de Sousa
- Rua Prof. Armindo Monteiro
- Rua Prof. Arsénio Cordeiro
- Rua Prof. Barbosa Sueiro
- Rua Prof. Bento de Jesus Caraça
- Rua Prof. Carlos Teixeira
- Rua Prof. Damião Peres
- Rua Prof. Delfim Santos
- Rua Prof. Dias Amado
- Rua Prof. Eduardo Cortesão
- Rua Prof. Fernando da Fonseca
- Rua Prof. Fernando de Mello Moser
- Rua Prof. Francisco Lucas Pires
- Rua Prof. Georges Zbyszewski
- Rua Prof. Henrique Vilhena
- Rua Prof. Hernâni Cidade
- Rua Prof. João Barreira
- Rua Prof. João Cândido de Oliveira
- Rua Prof. João de Castro Mendes
- Rua Prof. Jorge Campinos
- Rua Prof. José Pinto Correia
- Rua Prof. Luís da Cunha Gonçalves
- Rua Prof. Luís Reis Santos
- Rua Prof. Manuel Cavaleiro de Ferreira
- Rua Prof. Manuel Valadares
- Rua Prof. Mário Chicó
- Rua Prof. Mário de Albuquerque
- Rua Prof. Mark Athias
- Rua Prof. Moisés Amzalak
- Rua Prof. Moniz Pereira
- Rua Prof. Paulo Merêa
- Rua Prof. Prado Coelho
- Rua Prof. Pulido Valente
- Rua Prof. Queiroz Veloso
- Rua Prof. Simões Raposo
- Rua Prof. Veiga Ferreira
- Rua Prof. Vieira de Almeida
- Rua Prof.ª Virgínia Rau
- Rua Prof. Vítor Fontes
- Rua Professor Armando Santos Ferreira
- Rua Professor César Oliveira
- Rua Professor Eduardo Araújo Coelho
- Rua Professor Francisco Gentil
- Rua Professor Manuel Viegas Guerreiro
- Rua Professor Orlando Ribeiro
- Rua Professor Pinto Peixoto
- Rua Professor Salazar de Sousa
- Rua Professor Xavier Morato
- Rua Rainha Dona Luísa de Gusmão
- Rua Raúl Mesnier Du Ponsard
- Rua Raúl Nery
- Rua Rúben Cunha
- Rua Shegundo Galarza
- Rua Silva Tavares
- Rua Teófilo Carvalho dos Santos
- Rua Tomás Del Negro
- Rua Ventura Abrantes
- Rua Victor Cunha Rego
- Rua Virgínia Vitorino
- Rua Vítor Damas
- Travessa Coutinho
- Travessa do Alqueidão
- Travessa do Canavial
- Travessa do Morais
