= Alda Rosa =

Portuguese graphic designer (1935–2025)

- Rosa at about 30 years old
- Born: 1936; Braga, Portugal
- Died: 20 November 2025 (aged 88–89); Lisbon, Portugal
- Occupation: Graphic designer

Alda Rosa (1936 –2025) was a Portuguese graphic designer, considered to be a pioneer of graphic design by women in that country, known for her modernist and minimalist style. She was one of the founders of the Associação Nacional de Designers (National Association of Designers of Portugal – APD).

== Early life ==
Rosa was born in Braga in northern Portugal in 1936 into a wealthy family. She spent her early years in a large house in Viana do Castelo. From her childhood she suffered from asthma and she led a fairly sheltered early life. As a member of Catholic University Youth, she was persuaded by her mother at the age of 22 to go to Vienna to participate in the World Congress of Catholic Students and Intellectuals, presided over by Maria de Lourdes Pintassilgo who would go on to become the first and, to date, only female prime minister of Portugal. She graduated in painting from the Lisbon School of Fine Arts in 1959. She worked in Lisbon until 1967 when, with a scholarship from the Calouste Gulbenkian Foundation, she moved to London to study at the Ravensbourne College of Art and Design, staying there until 1970 and becoming one of the first Portuguese to graduate in graphic design.

== Career ==
In 1963, Rosa worked as a costume designer for the Portuguese film Os Verdes Anos (The Green Years), directed by Paulo Rocha. She also briefly worked with an architectural firm as an interior designer before, in 1965, she began working at the Industrial Art and Architecture Centre (NAAI) of INII (National Institute of Industrial Research). There, among other responsibilities, she was part of the organizing committee for the Portuguese Design Exhibitions of 1971 and 1973, designing the catalogue covers and graphic materials in collaboration with others.

She persuaded members of the different sections of INII of the benefits of creating a coordinated design and communications policy. While at INII she had the opportunity to do freelance work as an independent designer, creating book covers for publishers such as Estampa, Cosmos, Moraes, and Plátano, as well as designing catalogues and exhibition graphics. She worked as an advisor at the Directorate-General for Quality (DGQ) and later at the Portuguese Institute for Quality (IPQ). She was a member of the Installation Committee of the Portuguese Design Centre (CPD).

From 1987 to 1989, Rosa lived in the former Portuguese colony of Macau, where she created and later directed the graphic design department of the Macau Cultural Institute (ICM). Returning to Portugal, she was also a founding member of the Portuguese Association of Designers (APD), which she directed between 1990 and 1993. Later, she dedicated herself to graphic design for public entities, being also responsible for organizing several competitions and serving as a jury member. Her work included catalogues for the José Malhoa Museum, the National Theatre and Dance Museum, and the National Museum of the Azulejo. As a graphic designer, she was recognized for her modernist and minimalist style, marked by a strong typographic component and dynamic geometric forms. Her work has been exhibited in around 40 exhibitions.

== Death ==
Rosa died in Lisbon on 20 November 2025 and was buried in the Carnide Cemetery. Her intellectual estate was to be held at MUDE, the Museu do Design e da Moda, in Lisbon.

In June 2025, the INCM – Imprensa Nacional Casa da Moeda, had published a book of her designs.
