= National Theatre and Dance Museum =

- Museu Nacional do Teatro e da Dança
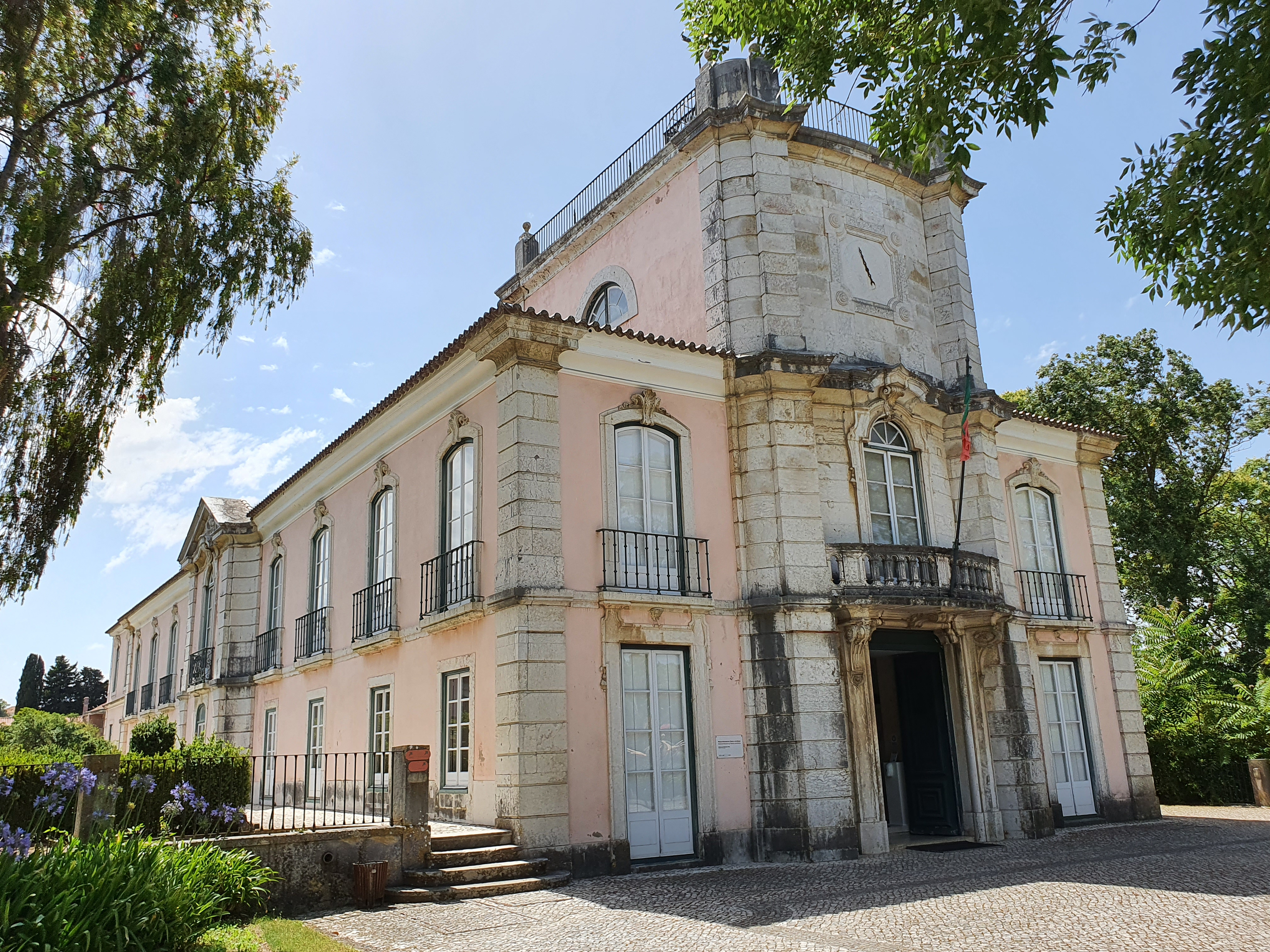
- National Theatre and Dance Museum
- Location: Lisbon, Portugal
- Coordinates: 38°46′28.52″N 9°10′0.17″W
- Type: Theatre and Dance Museum
- Website: Official website (in Portuguese)

The National Theatre and Dance Museum on Google Arts & Culture

The National Theatre and Dance Museum (Portuguese: Museu Nacional do Teatro e da Dança) is a museum in Lisbon, Portugal.
