= Deaths in September 1998 =

The following is a list of notable deaths in September 1998.

Entries for each day are listed alphabetically by surname. A typical entry lists information in the following sequence:

- Name, age, country of citizenship at birth, subsequent country of citizenship (if applicable), reason for notability, cause of death (if known), and reference.

== September 1998 ==
=== 1 ===
- Francisco V. Coching, 78, Filipino comic books illustrator and writer.
- Albert W. Johnson, 92, American politician, member of the United States House of Representatives (1963-1977).
- Harry Knudsen, 79, Danish rower and Olympic medalist (1948).
- Józef Krupiński, 67, Polish poet.
- Cary Middlecoff, 77, American golfer, heart disease.
- Nick Murphy, 31, English footballer, traffic collision.
- Ugo Pifferi, 68, Italian Olympic rower (1952).
- Vere Harmsworth, 3rd Viscount Rothermere, 73, British newspaper magnate.
- Osman Fahir Seden, 74, Turkish film director, screenwriter and film producer.
- Ernest Edward Williams, 84, American herpetologist.
- Petar Šegedin, 89, Croatian writer.

=== 2 ===
- Jackie Blanchflower, 65, Northern Irish footballer, cancer.
- Roy Bradford, 77, Northern Irish politician.
- Allen Drury, 80, American novelist and Pullizer Prize winner, cardiac arrest, heart attack.
- Charles A. Ferguson, 77, American linguist.
- Willie Kizart, 66, American electric blues guitarist.
- Walter L. Morgan, 100, American banker
- Danièle Parola, 93, French film actress.
- Tommy J. Smith, 81, Australian racehorse trainer.
- Notable victims of Swissair Flight 111:
  - Mary Lou Clements-Mann, 51, American AIDS researcher.
  - Jonathan Mann, 51, American physician, head of the WHO's AIDS program.

=== 3 ===
- Vince Alascia, 84, American comic book artist (Captain America).
- Motohiko Ban, 93, Japanese Olympic ski jumper (1928).
- Samuel Findlay Clark, 89, Canadian Army general.
- Ragnar Ekholdt, 84, Norwegian Olympic middle-distance runner (1936).
- Rick Kay, 48, American football player (Los Angeles Rams, Atlanta Falcons).
- Ellis R. Kerley, 74, American forensic anthropologist.
- Anup Kumar, 68, Indian actor.
- Friedrich Körner, 77, World War II Luftwaffe Flying ace.
- Albert Nemethy, 78, Hungarian-American artist.
- Jacek Płuciennik, 28, Polish footballer.
- John F. Thornell Jr., 77, World War II United States Army Air Forces Flying ace.

=== 4 ===
- Hans Brenner, 59, Austrian actor.
- Jimmy Constantine, 78, English football player.
- Col Costorphin, 44, Australian cricketer.
- Hernando Durán Dussán, Colombian lawyer and politician, respiratory infection.
- Robert Higgins, 73, American weightlifter.
- Ernst Jaakson, 93, Estonian diplomat.
- Elizabeth Kata, 85, Australian writer under the pseudonym "Elizabeth Kata".
- Charles Kemball, 75, Scottish chemist.
- Tania Long, 85, American journalist and war correspondent during World War II.
- Masato Nakae, 80, Japanese American US Army soldier and Medal of Honor recipient.
- Inge Scholl, 81, German activist and resistance member during World War II, cancer.
- Lal Waterson, 55, English folksinger and songwriter, cancer.

=== 5 ===
- Lütfü Aksoy, 87, Turkish Olympic footballer (1936).
- Fernando Balzaretti, 52, Mexican actor, cardiovascular disease.
- Raymond Cattell, 87, English cricketer.
- Leon Dombrowski, 60, American gridiron football player (New York Titans).
- Willem Drees, 75, Dutch politician and son of politician Willem Drees.
- Michael Fleischer, 90, American chemist and mineralogist.
- Sonny Knight, 64, American singer, songwriter and author, complications following a stroke.
- Margaret Lefranc, 91, American visual artist.
- Donald McCowen, 90, British rower and Olympian (1932).
- Félix Morisseau-Leroy, 86, Haitian writer.
- Minoru Niizuma, 67, Japanese abstract sculptor, stroke.
- Verner Panton, 72, Danish interior designer.
- Takis Papoulidis, 63, Greek footballer.
- Leo Penn, 77, American actor and director, lung cancer.
- Billy Soose, 83, American boxer.

=== 6 ===
- Vagn Hovard, 84, Danish Olympic field hockey player (1936, 1948).
- Ernst-Hugo Järegård, 69, Swedish cult actor, multiple myeloma.
- Akira Kurosawa, 88, Japanese film director and screenwriter (Seven Samurai, Rashomon, Throne of Blood), stroke.
- Hava Lazarus-Yafeh, 68, German-Israeli orientalist and academic.
- Ric Segreto, 45, American-Filipino singer-songwriter and actor, traffic collision.
- Elaine Shepard, 85, American actress.
- Denise Spencer, 68, Australian freestyle swimmer and Olympian (1948).
- Louis Van Parijs, 90, Belgian swimmer and Olympian (1928).

=== 7 ===
- Håvard Alstadheim, 62, Norwegian economist and politician.
- Mario Bardi, 77, Italian Realist painter, stroke.
- István Bezegh-Huszágh, 85, Hungarian Olympic fencer (1936).
- André Bonin, 89, French fencer and Olympic champion (1948).
- K. M. Chandy, 77, Indian freedom fighter and politician.
- Valeri Frid, 76, Soviet screenwriter.
- Earl Harrist, 79, American baseball player.
- John Hayes, 85, British Royal Navy officer.

=== 8 ===
- Walter Adams, 76, American economist and college professor, pancreatic cancer.
- Leonid Kinskey, 95, Russian-born actor, complications of a stroke.
- Arsh Muneer, 84, Pakistani actress and singer.
- Marco Rizo, 77, Cuban-American pianist, composer, and arranger, heart attack.
- Bill Shankland, 91, Australian sportsman, heart failure.
- Ewald Tilker, 86, German canoeist and Olympic medalist (1936).
- Tryfon Tzanetis, 80, Greek football player and coach.
- Howard Vocke, 83, American basketball player.
- Helfried Winger, 76, Austrian Olympic ice hockey player (1948).

=== 9 ===
- Lucio Battisti, 55, Italian singer-songwriter and composer, cancer.
- Bill Cratty, 47, American modern dancer and choreographer, liver cancer.
- Eleanor Garatti, 89, American swimmer and Olympic gold medalist (1928, 1932).
- Mariano Martín, 78, Spanish footballer.
- Catherine Turney, 91, American writer and screenwriter.
- Jerry Zimmerman, 63, American baseball player (Cincinnati Reds, Minnesota Twins), and coach.

=== 10 ===
- Carl Forgione, 54, British actor.
- Freddie Green, 82, English professional footballer.
- Adolfe de Hoernle, 96, German-American philanthropist.
- Noshirvan Nagarwala, 88, Indian cricket umpire.
- Sir Frederick Rosier, 82, British Royal Air Force commander.
- Kedar Man Vyathit, 84, Nepali poet.

=== 11 ===
- Paku Alam VIII, 88, Indonesian royal and Governor of Yogyakarta.
- Sofía Bassi, 85, Mexican painter and writer, heart failure.
- Larry Bradford, 48, American baseball player (Atlanta Braves).
- Dane Clark, 86, American actor.
- Stephie D'Souza, 61, Indian athlete and Olympian (1964).
- Carlos Guimard, 85, Argentine chess Grandmaster.
- Rolando Morán, 68, Guatemalan revolutionary leader, heart attack.
- P. S. Veerappa, 87, Indian actor and film producer.

=== 12 ===
- Jim Cope, 45, American football player (Atlanta Falcons).
- George E. Danielson, 83, American politician and judge, heart failure.
- Hans Grimm, 93, German film director and screenwriter.
- Azem Hajdari, 35, Albanian student leader, shot.
- Awang Hassan, 87, Malaysian politician.
- John Holliman, 49, American broadcast journalist, traffic collision.
- Henry Spira, 71, Belgian-American animal rights activist, esophageal cancer.

=== 13 ===
- Talimeren Ao, 80, Indian footballer, physician, and Olympian (1948).
- Denys Buckley, 92, English barrister and judge.
- Necdet Calp, 76, Turkish civil servant and politician, heart attack.
- Eugene Fruehauf, 85, American Olympic rower (1936).
- Aloys Grillmeier, 88, German Jesuit priest and theologian.
- Frans Hogenbirk, 80, Dutch football player.
- Owen Horwood, 81, South African economist and politician, heart attack.
- Antonio Núñez Jiménez, 75, Cuban revolutionary and academic.
- Harry Lumley, 71, Canadian ice hockey goaltender in the National Hockey League.
- Phil Ridings, 80, Australian cricket player.
- George Wallace, 79, American politician and populist, Parkinson's disease.

=== 14 ===
- Johnny Adams, 66, American blues, jazz and gospel singer, prostate cancer.
- Hahn William Capps, 95, American entomologist.
- Lance Duldig, 76, Australian cricketer.
- Sue Geh, 39, Australian women's basketball player and Olympian (1984), heart failure.
- Åke Jansson, 82, Swedish Olympic long-distance runner (1936).
- Fred Korth, 89, United States Secretary of the Navy.
- George Scott, 69, English snooker player.
- Yang Shangkun, 91, President of China.

=== 15 ===
- Fred Alderman, 93, American sprint runner and Olympic champion (1928).
- Barrett Deems, 84, American swing drummer, pneumonia.
- Charles George Drake, 78, Canadian neurosurgeon.
- René Ferrier, 61, French football midfielder.
- Viljo Heino, 84, Finnish long-distance runner and Olympian (1948).
- Reynold B. Johnson, 92, American inventor and computer pioneer, melanoma.
- Carl Larpenter, 62, American gridiron football player (Denver Broncos, Dallas Texans).
- Caroline Mikkelsen, 91, Danish-Norwegian explorer.
- Don Perkins, 80, American football player (Green Bay Packers, Chicago Bears).
- Louis Rasminsky, 90, Canadian banker.
- Eva Gabriele Reichmann, 101, German historian and sociologist.

=== 16 ===
- Egidio Ariosto, 87, Italian politician.
- Jane Marsh Beveridge, 82, Canadian artist.
- John Eakins, 75, Canadian politician.
- Hal Hilpirt, 90, American football player (New York Giants, Cincinnati Reds).
- Mazhar Khan, 43, Indian actor and producer, renal failure.
- Bjørn Stenersen, 28, Norwegian racing cyclist and Olympian (1992).
- Boris Stoev, 71, Bulgarian Olympic cross-country skier (1952).
- John Systad, 86, Norwegian long-distance runner and Olympian (1948, 1952).
- Andrzej Trzaskowski, 65, Polish jazz composer and musicologist.
- Pak Tu-jin, 82, Korean poet.
- Harold Vokes, 90, American malacologist and paleontologist.
- John Woyat, 65, Canadian football player.

=== 17 ===
- William Albright, 53, American composer, pianist and organist.
- Ted Binion, 54, American gambling executive.
- Geoffrey Dutton, 76, Australian author and historian.
- Win Elliot, 83, American television and radio sportscaster and game show host.
- Slim Emmerich, 78, American baseball player (New York Giants).
- April FitzLyon, 78, English translator, biographer, and historian.
- Gerold Frank, 91, American author and ghostwriter.
- Abe Geldenhuys, 65, South African Olympic wrestler (1956, 1960).
- Red Hoff, 107, American left-handed pitcher in Major League Baseball (New York Highlanders/Yankees, St. Louis Browns), fall.
- Gustav Nezval, 90, Czech stage and film actor.
- Ralph Pappier, 84, Argentine production designer and film director.
- Celia Rooke, 96, English printmaker and book illustrator.

=== 18 ===
- Francelia Butler, 85, American scholar and children's author.
- Paul Dolan, 71, Irish sprinter and Olympian (1948, 1952).
- Charlie Foxx, 64, American musician.
- Kurt Hager, 86, East German politician.
- Erik Holmberg, 76, Norwegian football player and Olympian (1952).
- Sam Locke, 81, American writer and director.
- Harun Nasution, 79, Indonesian scholar.
- Vadim Rogovin, 61, Russian Trotskyist historian and sociologist.
- Bob Stringer, 68, American football player (Philadelphia Eagles).

=== 19 ===
- Susan Barrantes, 61, British film producer and mother of Sarah Ferguson, traffic collision.
- Patricia Hayes, 88, English actress (The NeverEnding Story, Willow, A Fish Called Wanda).
- Ran Laurie, 83, British physician, Olympic gold medalist (1936, 1948), and father of Hugh Laurie, Parkinson's disease.
- John Norby, 88, American gridiron football player (Philadelphia Eagles, New York Giants, Brooklyn Dodgers).

=== 20 ===
- Audrey Alexandra Brown, 93, Canadian poet.
- Muriel Humphrey Brown, 86, American politician and wife of Vice President Hubert Humphrey.
- Robert Malachy Burke, 91, Irish socialist and philanthropist.
- Lila Katzen, 72, American abstract sculptor, liver cancer.
- Alan Prescott, 71, English rugby league footballer.
- Raoul Schránil, 88, Czech film actor.
- Uli Strohschneider, 58, Austrian Olympic sailor (1972).

=== 21 ===
- Margaret Allan, 89, Scottish motor racing driver.
- Oz Bach, 59, American folk musician, cancer.
- Clara Calamai, 89, Italian actress, stroke.
- Florence Griffith Joyner, 38, American track and field athlete, and Olympic champion (1984, 1988), epilepsy.
- Frederick Samuel Modise, 84, South African leader of International Pentecostal Holiness Church (Africa).
- Vladimir Pokhilko, 44, Soviet-Russian entrepreneur, suicide by throat-cutting.
- Bert Steines, 68, German Olympic hurdler (1956).
- Arto Tiainen, 68, Finnish cross-country skier, politician, and Olympian (1956, 1960, 1964, 1968).

=== 22 ===
- Semira Adamu, 20, Nigerian asylum seeker.
- Ymer Dishnica, 86, Albanian politician and physician.
- Michel Dubé, 39, Canadian outlaw biker and gangster, suicide.
- Otakhon Latifi, 62, Tajikistan journalist and politician, shot.
- Henry Mayer, 72, German composer.
- Doug Smith, 73, Scottish rugby union player.

=== 23 ===
- Søren Andersen, 72, Danish football player and Olympian (1952).
- Trevor Berghan, 84, New Zealand rugby union player.
- Ray Bowden, 89, English footballer.
- Mary Frann, 55, American actress (Newhart, Days of Our Lives, Knots Landing), heart attack.
- Brian Masters, 65, British Anglican prelate, Bishop of Fulham and Edmonton.
- Victor Ransom, 81, English cricketer.
- Héctor Vilches, 72, Uruguayan footballer.
- Robert Wells, 75, American songwriter and television producer.

=== 24 ===
- Genrikh Altshuller, 71, Soviet engineer, inventor, and writer, Parkinson's disease.
- Rosendo Balinas Jr., 57, Filipino chess grandmaster.
- Frank Curran, 81, English footballer.
- Jeff Moss, 56, American composer, playwright and television writer, colon cancer.
- Ernie Pannell, 81, American gridiron football player (Green Bay Packers).

=== 25 ===
- Billy Giles, 41, Northern Irish UVF volunteer, suicide by hanging.
- Shaukat Hayat Khan, 83, Pakistani politician, activist and military officer.
- Johnny McGrory, 83, Scottish boxer.
- Wim Schepers, 55, Dutch road cyclist, cardiac arrest.
- Cas Walker, 96, American politician and radio and TV personality.
- Caspar Wrede, 69, Finnish theatre and film director.

=== 26 ===
- Giovanni Barbini, 97, Italian naval officer during World War II.
- Betty Carter, 69, American jazz singer, pancreatic cancer.
- Jack Haskell, 79, American singer and announcer.
- Toyonishiki Kiichiro, 78, American-born Japanese sumo wrestler.
- Jerome D. Mack, 77, American banker, fundraiser and philanthropist, cancer.
- Johanna Vancura, 83, Austrian Olympic sprinter (1936).
- Harald Vock, 73, German television producer and director.

=== 27 ===
- Edward Jefferys, 62, South African Olympic sprinter (1960).
- Alex Joseph, 62, American outspoken polygamist and founder of the Confederate Nations of Israel, a Mormon fundamentalist sect, liver cancer.
- Karlheinz Kaske, 70, German manager and CEO of the Siemens AG from 1981 to 1992.
- Narita Brian, 7, Japanese racehorse, gastric rupture.
- Shawn Phelan, 23, American actor (Toy Soldiers), brain injury.
- Doak Walker, 71, American football player (Detroit Lions) and member of the Pro Football Hall of Fame, skiing accident.

=== 28 ===
- Dominique Diroux, 20, Dutch footballer.
- Frank Dreise, 84, Australian rugby league footballer.
- Nataliya Kuznetsova-Lobanova, 51, Soviet Russian diver and Olympian (1964, 1968, 1972).
- Eric Malling, 52, Canadian television journalist, brain hemorrhage after fall.
- Joan Maude, 90, English actress.
- Marcel Pourbaix, 94, Belgian chemist.
- Louis L. Redding, 96, American lawyer and civil rights advocate.
- Shiv Prasaad Singh, 70, Indian writer and academic.
- Mario Soto, 65, Chilean footballer.
- George Tranter, 83, English football player.

=== 29 ===
- Tom Bradley, 80, American politician and police officer, heart attack.
- Valston Hancock, 91, Australian commander in the Royal Australian Air Force.
- Gordon W. Richards, 68, British racehorse trainer.
- Joachim Count of Schönburg-Glauchau, 69, German nobleman.

=== 30 ===
- D. Bruce Berry, 74, American comic book artist (Captain America).
- Laurie Brown, 61, English football player, manager, and Olympian (1960).
- Frank Forberger, 55, East German rower and Olympic champion (1968, 1972), brain cancer.
- Marius Goring, 86, English actor, cancer.
- Tim Hall, 24, American football player (Oakland Raiders).
- Nechama Hendel, 62, Israeli singer.
- Émile Krieps, 78, Luxembourgish army officer and politician.
- Bruno Munari, 90, Italian artist and designer.
- Stephen Pearlman, 63, American actor (Die Hard with a Vengeance, Pi, Quiz Show), cancer.
- Dan Quisenberry, 45, American baseball player (Kansas City Royals, St. Louis Cardinals, San Francisco Giants), brain cancer.
- Robert R. Squires, 45, American chemist.
- Pavel Štěpán, 73, Czech pianist.
- Robert Lewis Taylor, 86, American author and Pullizer Prize winner.
- Omar Tebbaka, 69, Algerian-born French Olympic boxer (1952).
