= September 9 =

September 9 this year in various calendars
- Wednesday, 9 September 2026
Akan	Nwonawukuo
Armenian	21 Hoṙi 1476
Aztec	Tititl 2, 9 Itzcuintli
Babylonian	26 Abu, 2337 SE
Balinese pawukon	Luang, Pepet, Beteng, Menala, Wage, Aryang, Buda of Menail, Yama, Jangur, Pati
Bengali	25 Bhadro, BS 1433
Chinese	Yang Fire Dog・Three Stars Mansion; Fire Horse Year, Month 7, Day 28 (Bailu, 14 days until Qiufen)
Common Era	9 September 2026 CE
Coptic	4 Nesi, AM 1742
Egyptian	26 Tybi, 2775 NE
Ethiopian	4 Pāguemēn, 2018 Amätä Məhrät
French Republican	Décade III, Tridi de Fructidor de l'Année 234 de la République
Gregorian	9 September, AD 2026
Hebrew	27 Elul, AM 5786
Hindu	Āśleṣā・Parigha; Solar: 24 Bhādrapada, 1948 SE; Lunisolar: Trayodaśī, Kṛishna pakṣa of Śrāvaṇa, 2083 VE; Rāudra・5127 KY・1,872,827
Icelandic	Miðvikudagur, 16 Tvímánuður 2026
Islamic	26 Rabi' al-awwal, AH 1448 (using tabular method)
ISO week date	2026-W37-3
Japanese	28 Fumizuki, Reiwa 8 (Hakuro, 14 days until Shūbun)
Julian	27 August, AD 2026 (AM 7534)
Julian day	2461293
Korean	28 Wonsungidal, 4359 DE
Maya	13.0.13.16.10; 3 Chen, 9 Oc
Roman	ante diem VI Kalendas Septembres, MMDCCLXXIX AUC
Solar Hijri	18 Shahrivar, SH 1405
Tibetan	28 gro bzhin, me pho rta 2153 or 1772 or 1000

<<	September					>>
Su	Mo	Tu	We	Th	Fr	Sa
		1	2	3	4	5
6	7	8	9	10	11	12
13	14	15	16	17	18	19
20	21	22	23	24	25	26
27	28	29	30
2026

September 9 in recent years
2026 (Wednesday)
2025 (Tuesday)
2024 (Monday)
2023 (Saturday)
2022 (Friday)
2021 (Thursday)
2020 (Wednesday)
2019 (Monday)
2018 (Sunday)
2017 (Saturday)

September 9 is the 252nd day of the year (253rd in leap years) in the Gregorian calendar; 113 days remain until the end of the year.

== Events ==
=== Pre-1600 ===
- 337 – Constantine II, Constantius II, and Constans succeed their father Constantine I as co-emperors. The Roman Empire is divided between the three Augusti.
- 1000 – Battle of Svolder during the Viking Age.
- 1141 – Yelü Dashi, the Liao dynasty general who founded the Qara Khitai, defeats the Seljuq and Kara-Khanid forces at the Battle of Qatwan.
- 1320 – In the Battle of Saint George, the Byzantines under Andronikos Asen ambush and defeat the forces of the Principality of Achaea, securing possession of Arcadia.
- 1488 – Anne becomes sovereign Duchess of Brittany, becoming a central figure in the struggle for influence that leads to the union of Brittany and France.
- 1493 – Battle of Krbava Field, a decisive defeat of Croats in Croatian struggle against the invasion by the Ottoman Empire.
- 1493 – Christopher Columbus, with 17 ships and 1,200 men, sails on second voyage from Cadiz.
- 1499 – The citizens of Lisbon celebrate the triumphal return of the explorer Vasco de Gama, completing his two-year journey around the Cape of Good Hope to India.
- 1513 – James IV of Scotland is defeated and dies in the Battle of Flodden, ending Scotland's involvement in the War of the League of Cambrai.
- 1543 – Mary Stuart, at nine months old, is crowned "Queen of Scots" in the central Scottish town of Stirling.
- 1561 – The ultimately unsuccessful Colloquy of Poissy opens in an effort to reconcile French Catholics and Protestants.
- 1588 – Thomas Cavendish in his ship Desire enters Plymouth and completes the first deliberately planned voyage of circumnavigation.

=== 1601–1900 ===
- 1739 – Stono Rebellion, the largest slave uprising in Britain's mainland North American colonies prior to the American Revolution, erupts near Charleston, South Carolina.
- 1776 – The Continental Congress officially names its union of states the United States.
- 1791 – Washington, D.C., the capital of the United States, is named after President George Washington.
- 1796 – Grenelle camp affair, a failed uprising by supporters of Gracchus Babeuf against the French Directory.
- 1801 – Alexander I of Russia confirms the privileges of Baltic provinces.
- 1839 – John Herschel takes the first glass plate photograph.
- 1845 – Possible start of the Great Famine of Ireland.
- 1850 – The Compromise of 1850 transfers a third of Texas's claimed territory to federal control in return for the U.S. federal government assuming $10 million of Texas's pre-annexation debt.
- 1850 – California is admitted as the thirty-first U.S. state.
- 1855 – Crimean War: The Siege of Sevastopol comes to an end when Russian forces abandon the city.
- 1863 – American Civil War: The Union Army enters Chattanooga, Tennessee.
- 1882 – A British force repels an Egyptian force led by Ahmed Urabi in the battle of Qassasin during the Anglo-Egyptian War.
- 1892 – Amalthea becomes the last moon to be discovered without the use of photography.

=== 1901–present ===
- 1914 – World War I: The creation of the Canadian Automobile Machine Gun Brigade, the first fully mechanized unit in the British Army.
- 1922 – The Greco-Turkish War effectively ends with Turkish victory over the Greeks in Smyrna.
- 1923 – Mustafa Kemal Atatürk, the founder of the Republic of Turkey, founds the Republican People's Party.
- 1924 – Hanapepe massacre occurs on Kauai, Hawaii.
- 1926 – Yleisradio (YLE), the Finnish national public broadcasting company, begins its broadcasts.
- 1936 – The crews of Portuguese Navy frigate NRP Afonso de Albuquerque and destroyer Dão mutiny against the Salazar dictatorship's support of General Franco's coup and declare their solidarity with the Spanish Republic.
- 1939 – World War II: The Battle of Hel begins, the longest-defended pocket of Polish Army resistance during the German invasion of Poland.
- 1939 – Burmese national hero U Ottama dies in prison after a hunger strike to protest Britain's colonial government.
- 1940 – George Stibitz pioneers the first remote operation of a computer.
- 1940 – Treznea Massacre in Transylvania.
- 1942 – World War II: A Japanese floatplane drops incendiary bombs on Oregon.
- 1943 – World War II: The Allies land at Salerno and Taranto, Italy.
- 1944 – World War II: The Fatherland Front takes power in Bulgaria through a military coup in the capital and armed rebellion in the country. A new pro-Soviet government is established.
- 1945 – World War II and Second Sino-Japanese War: The Empire of Japan formally surrenders to China.
- 1948 – Kim Il Sung is appointed as premier of the Democratic People's Republic of Korea (North Korea). This is celebrated annually as its national holiday.
- 1954 – The 6.7 M_{w} Chlef earthquake shakes northern Algeria with a maximum Mercalli intensity of XI (Extreme). At least 1,243 people were killed and 5,000 were injured.
- 1956 – Elvis Presley appears on The Ed Sullivan Show for the first time.
- 1965 – The United States Department of Housing and Urban Development is established.
- 1965 – Hurricane Betsy makes its second landfall near New Orleans, leaving 76 dead and $1.42 billion ($10–12 billion in 2005 dollars) in damages, becoming the first hurricane to cause over $1 billion in unadjusted damage.
- 1966 – The National Traffic and Motor Vehicle Safety Act is signed into law by U.S. President Lyndon B. Johnson.
- 1969 – In Canada, the Official Languages Act comes into force, making French equal to English throughout the Federal government.
- 1969 – Allegheny Airlines Flight 863 collides in mid-air with a Piper PA-28 Cherokee over Moral Township, Shelby County, Indiana, killing all 83 people on board both aircraft.
- 1970 – A British airliner is hijacked by the Popular Front for the Liberation of Palestine and flown to Dawson's Field in Jordan.
- 1971 – The four-day Attica Prison riot begins, eventually resulting in 39 dead, most killed by state troopers retaking the prison.
- 1972 – In Kentucky's Mammoth Cave National Park, a Cave Research Foundation exploration and mapping team discovers a link between the Mammoth and Flint Ridge cave systems, making it the longest known cave passageway in the world.
- 1976 – Two Aeroflot flights collide in mid-air over Anapa, Soviet Union, killing 70.
- 1988 – Vietnam Airlines Flight 831 crashes in Khu Khot, Thailand, while on approach to Don Muang International Airport, killing 76.
- 1990 – Batticaloa massacre: Massacre of 184 Tamil civilians by the Sri Lankan Army in Batticaloa District.
- 1991 – Tajikistan declares independence from the Soviet Union.
- 1993 – Israeli–Palestinian peace process: The Palestine Liberation Organization officially recognizes Israel as a legitimate state.
- 1994 – Space Shuttle program: Space Shuttle Discovery is launched on STS-64.
- 2001 – Ahmad Shah Massoud, leader of the Northern Alliance, is assassinated in Afghanistan by two al-Qaeda assassins who claimed to be Arab journalists wanting an interview.
- 2006 – Space Shuttle Program: Space Shuttle Atlantis is launched on STS-115 to resume assembling the International Space Station. It is the first ISS assembly mission after the Columbia disaster back in 2003.
- 2009 – The Dubai Metro, the first urban train network in the Arabian Peninsula, is ceremonially inaugurated.
- 2012 – The Indian space agency puts into orbit its heaviest foreign satellite yet, in a streak of 21 consecutive successful PSLV launches.
- 2012 – A wave of attacks kills more than 100 people and injure 350 others across Iraq.
- 2014 – The album Songs of Innocence by U2 is digitally released at no charge to all customers of the iTunes Music Store, appearing automatically in the "purchased" section of over 500 million users worldwide.
- 2015 – Elizabeth II becomes the longest reigning monarch of the United Kingdom.
- 2016 – The government of North Korea conducts its fifth and reportedly biggest nuclear test. World leaders condemn the act, with South Korea calling it "maniacal recklessness".
- 2025 – Six people are killed when Israel carries out an airstrike on Doha in a failed attempt to decapitate the Hamas leadership.
- 2025 – Several Russian drones incur on Polish airspace and are subsequently shot down, marking the first time a NATO member has engaged Russian military assets.

== Births ==
=== Pre-1600 ===
- 214/15 – Aurelian, Roman emperor (died 275)
- 384 – Honorius, Roman emperor (died 423)
- 1349 – Albert III, Duke of Austria (died 1395)
- 1427 – Thomas de Ros, 9th Baron de Ros, English soldier and politician (died 1464)
- 1466 – Ashikaga Yoshitane, Japanese shōgun (died 1523)
- 1558 – Philippe Emmanuel, Duke of Mercœur (died 1602)
- 1585 – Cardinal Richelieu, French cardinal and politician (died 1642)

=== 1601–1900 ===
- 1629 – Cornelis Tromp, Dutch general (died 1691)
- 1700 – Princess Anna Sophie of Schwarzburg-Rudolstadt (died 1780)
- 1711 – Thomas Hutchinson, English historian and politician, Governor of the province of Massachusetts Bay (died 1780)
- 1721 – Fredrik Henrik af Chapman, Swedish admiral and shipbuilder (died 1808)
- 1731 – Francisco Javier Clavijero, Mexican priest, historian, and scholar (died 1787)
- 1737 – Luigi Galvani, Italian physician and physicist (died 1798)
- 1754 – William Bligh, English admiral and politician, 4th Governor of New South Wales (died 1817)
- 1755 – Benjamin Bourne, American judge and politician (died 1808)
- 1777 – James Carr, American soldier and politician (died 1818)
- 1778 – Clemens Brentano, German poet and author (died 1842)
- 1789 – William Cranch Bond, American astronomer, and first director of Harvard College Observatory (died 1859)
- 1789 – Menachem Mendel Schneersohn, Polish rabbi (died 1866)
- 1807 – Richard Chenevix Trench, Irish-English archbishop and philologist (died 1886)
- 1823 – Joseph Leidy, American paleontologist and academic (died 1891)
- 1828 – Leo Tolstoy, Russian author and playwright (died 1910)
- 1834 – Joseph Henry Shorthouse, English author (died 1903)
- 1853 – Fred Spofforth, Australian-English cricketer and merchant (died 1926)
- 1855 – Houston Stewart Chamberlain, English-German philosopher and author (died 1927)
- 1863 – Herbert Henry Ball, English-Canadian journalist and politician (died 1943)
- 1868 – Mary Hunter Austin, American author, poet, and critic (died 1934)
- 1873 – Max Reinhardt, Austrian-born American theater and film director (died 1943)
- 1876 – Frank Chance, American baseball player and manager (died 1924)
- 1877 – James Agate, English journalist, author, and critic (died 1947)
- 1878 – Adelaide Crapsey, American poet and critic (died 1914)
- 1878 – Arthur Fox, English-American fencer (died 1958)
- 1878 – Sergio Osmeña, Filipino lawyer and politician, 4th President of the Philippines (died 1961)
- 1882 – Clem McCarthy, American sportscaster (died 1962)
- 1885 – Miriam Licette, English soprano and educator (died 1969)
- 1885 – Clare Sheridan, English sculptor and author (died 1970)
- 1887 – Alf Landon, American lieutenant, banker, and politician, 26th Governor of Kansas (died 1987)
- 1890 – Colonel Sanders, American businessman, founded KFC (died 1980)
- 1894 – Arthur Freed, American composer and producer (died 1973)
- 1894 – Humphrey Mitchell, Canadian trade union leader and politician, 14th Canadian Minister of Labour (died 1950)
- 1894 – Bert Oldfield, Australian cricketer and soldier (died 1976)
- 1898 – Frankie Frisch, American baseball player and manager (died 1973)
- 1899 – Neil Hamilton, American stage, film and television actor (died 1984)
- 1899 – Waite Hoyt, American baseball player and sportscaster (died 1984)
- 1899 – Bruno E. Jacob, American academic, founded the National Forensic League (died 1979)
- 1900 – James Hilton, English-American author and screenwriter (died 1954)

=== 1901–present ===
- 1903 – Lev Shankovsky, Ukrainian military historian (died 1995)
- 1903 – Edward Upward, English author (died 2009)
- 1903 – Phyllis A. Whitney, American author (died 2008)
- 1904 – Feroze Khan, Indian-Pakistani field hockey player and coach (died 2005)
- 1904 – Arthur Laing, Canadian lawyer and politician, 9th Canadian Minister of Veterans Affairs (died 1975)
- 1905 – Joseph E. Levine, American film producer, founded Embassy Pictures (died 1987)
- 1905 – Brahmarishi Hussain Sha, Indian philosopher and poet (died 1981)
- 1906 – Ali Hadi Bara, Iranian-Turkish sculptor and educator (died 1971)
- 1907 – Leon Edel, American author and critic (died 1997)
- 1908 – Cesare Pavese, Italian poet and author (died 1950)
- 1908 – Shigekazu Shimazaki, Japanese admiral (died 1945)
- 1911 – Paul Goodman, American author, poet, and playwright (died 1972)
- 1911 – John Gorton, Australian lieutenant and politician, 19th Prime Minister of Australia (died 2002)
- 1914 – John Passmore, Australian philosopher and academic (died 2004)
- 1918 – Oscar Luigi Scalfaro, Italian lawyer and politician, 9th President of Italy (died 2012)
- 1919 – Gottfried Dienst, Swiss footballer and referee (died 1998)
- 1919 – Jimmy Snyder, American sportscaster (died 1996)
- 1920 – Neil Chotem, Canadian pianist, composer, and conductor (died 2008)
- 1920 – Feng Kang, Chinese mathematician and physicist (died 1993)
- 1920 – Robert Wood Johnson III, American businessman and philanthropist (died 1970)
- 1922 – Hoyt Curtin, American composer and producer (died 2000)
- 1922 – Hans Georg Dehmelt, German-American physicist and academic, Nobel Prize laureate (died 2017)
- 1922 – Manolis Glezos, Greek journalist and politician (died 2020)
- 1922 – Warwick Estevam Kerr, Brazilian geneticist, entomologist, and engineer (died 2018)
- 1923 – Daniel Carleton Gajdusek, American physician and academic, Nobel Prize laureate (died 2008)
- 1923 – Cliff Robertson, American actor (died 2011)
- 1924 – Jane Greer, American actress (died 2001)
- 1924 – Sylvia Miles, American actress (died 2019)
- 1924 – Russell M. Nelson, American captain, surgeon, and religious leader (died 2025)
- 1924 – Rik Van Steenbergen, Belgian cyclist (died 2003)
- 1926 – Louise Abeita, Isleta Pueblo (Native American) writer, poet, and educator (died 2014)
- 1926 – Yusuf al-Qaradawi, Egyptian theologian and author (died 2022)
- 1927 – Elvin Jones, American drummer and bandleader (died 2004)
- 1927 – Tatyana Zaslavskaya, Russian sociologist and economist (died 2013)
- 1928 – Moses Anderson, American Roman Catholic bishop (died 2013)
- 1928 – Sol LeWitt, American painter and sculptor (died 2007)
- 1929 – Claude Nougaro, French singer-songwriter (died 2004)
- 1930 – Francis Carroll, Australian archbishop (died 2024)
- 1931 – Robin Hyman, English author and publisher (died 2017)
- 1931 – Zoltán Latinovits, Hungarian actor and author (died 1976)
- 1931 – Ida Mae Martinez, American wrestler (died 2010)
- 1931 – Shirley Summerskill, English physician and politician
- 1931 – Margaret Tyzack, English actress (died 2011)
- 1932 – Carm Lino Spiteri, Maltese architect and politician (died 2008)
- 1933 – Nadim Sawalha, Jordanian-born English actor
- 1934 – Nicholas Liverpool, Dominican lawyer and politician, 6th President of Dominica (died 2015)
- 1934 – Sonia Sanchez, American poet, playwright, and activist
- 1935 – Gopal Baratham, Singaporean neurosurgeon and author (died 2002)
- 1935 – Chaim Topol, Israeli actor, singer, and producer (died 2023)
- 1936 – Bobby Baun, Canadian NHL hockey defenseman (died 2023)
- 1936 – William Bradshaw, Baron Bradshaw, English academic and politician
- 1938 – John Davis, English anthropologist and academic (died 2017)
- 1938 – Jay Ward, American baseball player, coach, and manager (died 2012)
- 1939 – Ron McDole, American football player
- 1940 – Hugh Morgan, Australian businessman
- 1940 – Joe Negroni, American doo-wop singer (died 1978)
- 1941 – Syed Abid Ali, Indian cricketer
- 1941 – Otis Redding, American singer-songwriter and producer (died 1967)
- 1941 – Dennis Ritchie, American computer scientist, created the C programming language (died 2011)
- 1942 – The Iron Sheik, Iranian-American wrestler and actor (died 2023)
- 1942 – Inez Foxx, American singer (died 2022)
- 1942 – Danny Kalb, American singer and guitarist (died 2022)
- 1943 – Frank Clark, English footballer, manager and chairman
- 1945 – Ton van Heugten, Dutch motocross racer (died 2008)
- 1945 – Dee Dee Sharp, American singer
- 1945 – Doug Ingle, American singer-songwriter and keyboard player (died 2024)
- 1946 – Jim Keays, Scottish-Australian singer-songwriter (died 2014)
- 1946 – Bruce Palmer, Canadian folk-rock bass player (died 2004)
- 1947 – David Rosenboom, American composer and educator
- 1947 – Freddy Weller, American singer-songwriter and guitarist
- 1947 – T. M. Wright, American author, poet, and illustrator (died 2015)
- 1949 – John Curry, English figure skater (died 1994)
- 1949 – Daniel Pipes, American historian and author
- 1949 – Joe Theismann, American football player and sportscaster
- 1949 – Susilo Bambang Yudhoyono, Indonesian general and politician, 6th President of Indonesia
- 1950 – Gogi Alauddin, Pakistani squash player and coach
- 1950 – John McFee, American singer-songwriter, guitarist, and producer
- 1951 – Alexander Downer, Australian economist and politician, 34th Minister of Foreign Affairs for Australia
- 1951 – Tom Wopat, American actor and singer
- 1952 – Angela Cartwright, English-American actress, author, and singer
- 1952 – Per Jørgensen, Norwegian singer and trumpet player
- 1952 – Dave Stewart, English singer-songwriter, guitarist, and producer
- 1953 – Janet Fielding, Australian actress
- 1954 – Walter Davis, American basketball player (died 2023)
- 1955 – John Kricfalusi, Canadian voice actor, animator, director, and screenwriter
- 1956 – Avi Wigderson, Israeli mathematician and computer scientist (2023 Turing Prize for randomness)
- 1957 – Pierre-Laurent Aimard, French pianist and educator
- 1959 – Tom Foley, American baseball player and coach
- 1959 – Éric Serra, French composer and producer
- 1960 – Hugh Grant, English actor and producer
- 1960 – Bob Hartley, Canadian ice hockey player and coach
- 1960 – Johnson Righeira, Italian singer-songwriter, musician, record producer and actor
- 1960 – Bob Stoops, American football player and coach
- 1960 – Kimberly Willis Holt, American author
- 1963 – Chris Coons, American lawyer and politician
- 1963 – Roberto Donadoni, Italian footballer and manager
- 1963 – Neil Fairbrother, English cricketer
- 1964 – Aleksandar Hemon, Bosnian-American author and critic
- 1964 – Skip Kendall, American golfer
- 1965 – Charles Esten, American actor, comedian, and musician
- 1965 – Dan Majerle, American basketball player and coach
- 1965 – Constance Marie, American actress
- 1965 – Marcel Peeper, Dutch footballer
- 1966 – Georg Hackl, German luger and coach
- 1966 – Kevin Hatcher, American ice hockey player
- 1966 – Adam Sandler, American actor, comedian, producer, and screenwriter
- 1966 – Brian Smith, Australian-Irish rugby player and coach (died 2026)
- 1966 – Alison Sydor, Canadian cyclist (Olympic silver 1996)
- 1967 – B. J. Armstrong, American basketball player and sportscaster
- 1967 – Chris Caffery, American singer-songwriter and guitarist
- 1967 – Mark Shrader, American wrestler
- 1967 – Akshay Kumar, Indian actor and producer
- 1968 – Jon Drummond, American sprinter and coach
- 1968 – Clive Mendonca, English footballer
- 1968 – Julia Sawalha, English actress
- 1969 – Rachel Hunter, New Zealand model and actress
- 1969 – Natasha Stott Despoja, Australian politician
- 1970 – Natalia Streignard, Spanish-Venezuelan actress
- 1971 – Eric Stonestreet, American actor
- 1971 – Henry Thomas, American actor and guitarist
- 1972 – Mike Hampton, American baseball player and coach
- 1972 – Natasha Kaplinsky, English journalist
- 1972 – Jakko Jan Leeuwangh, Dutch speed skater
- 1972 – Miriam Oremans, Dutch tennis player
- 1972 – Xavi Pascual, Spanish professional basketball coach
- 1972 – Félix Rodríguez, Dominican baseball player
- 1972 – Goran Višnjić, Croatian-American actor
- 1973 – Kazuhisa Ishii, Japanese baseball player
- 1974 – Vikram Batra, Indian captain (died 1999)
- 1974 – Shane Crawford, Australian footballer and television host
- 1974 – Marcos Curiel, American singer-songwriter, guitarist, and producer
- 1974 – Jun Kasai, Japanese wrestler
- 1974 – Gok Wan, English fashion stylist, author, and television host
- 1975 – Michael Bublé, Canadian singer-songwriter and actor
- 1975 – Anton Oliver, New Zealand rugby player
- 1976 – Emma de Caunes, French actress
- 1976 – El Intocable, Mexican wrestler
- 1976 – Hanno Möttölä, Finnish basketball player
- 1976 – Joey Newman, American composer and conductor
- 1976 – Mattias Öhlund, Swedish ice hockey player
- 1976 – Aki Riihilahti, Finnish footballer and coach
- 1976 – Kristoffer Rygg, Norwegian singer-songwriter and producer
- 1977 – Kyle Snyder, American baseball player and coach
- 1977 – Fatih Tekke, Turkish footballer and manager
- 1978 – Kurt Ainsworth, American baseball player and businessman, co-founded Marucci Sports
- 1978 – Shane Battier, American basketball player and sportscaster
- 1979 – Wayne Carlisle, Northern Irish footballer and coach
- 1979 – Nikki DeLoach, American actress and singer
- 1980 – Todd Coffey, American baseball player
- 1980 – David Fa'alogo, New Zealand rugby league player
- 1980 – Michelle Williams, American actress
- 1981 – Julie Gonzalo, Argentine-American actress
- 1982 – John Kuhn, American football player
- 1982 – Graham Onions, English cricketer
- 1982 – Ai Otsuka, Japanese singer-songwriter, pianist, and actress
- 1983 – Vitolo, Spanish footballer
- 1983 – Kyle Davies, American baseball player
- 1983 – Edwin Jackson, American baseball player
- 1983 – Cleveland Taylor, English footballer
- 1984 – Brad Guzan, American soccer player
- 1984 – James Hildreth, English cricketer
- 1984 – Michalis Sifakis, Greek footballer
- 1985 – Martin Johnson, American singer-songwriter, guitarist, and producer
- 1985 – Luka Modrić, Croatian footballer
- 1985 – J. R. Smith, American basketball player
- 1986 – Michael Bowden, American baseball player
- 1986 – Chamu Chibhabha, Zimbabwean cricketer
- 1986 – Timothy Granaderos, American actor and model
- 1986 – Luc Mbah a Moute, Cameroonian basketball player
- 1986 – Keith Yandle, American hockey player
- 1987 – Markus Jürgenson, Estonian footballer
- 1987 – Andrea Petkovic, German tennis player
- 1987 – Afrojack, Dutch-Surinamese DJ, record producer, and remixer
- 1987 – Ahmed Elmohamady, Egyptian footballer
- 1987 – Nicole Aniston, American actress and model
- 1988 – Danilo D'Ambrosio, Italian footballer
- 1988 – Will Middlebrooks, American baseball player
- 1989 – Alfonzo Dennard, American football player
- 1989 – Casey Hayward, American football player
- 1990 – Billy Hamilton, American baseball player
- 1990 – Shaun Johnson, New Zealand rugby league player
- 1990 – Haley Reinhart, American singer-songwriter and actress
- 1990 – Andrew Smith, American basketball player (died 2016)
- 1990 – Jordan Tabor, English footballer (died 2014)
- 1991 – Kelsey Asbille, American actress
- 1991 – Lauren Daigle, American contemporary Christian music singer and songwriter
- 1991 – Hunter Hayes, American singer-songwriter and guitarist
- 1991 – Oscar, Brazilian footballer
- 1991 – Danilo Pereira, Bissauan-Portuguese footballer
- 1992 – Shannon Boyd, Australian rugby league player
- 1992 – Damian McGinty, Northern Irish actor and singer
- 1993 – Cameron Cullen, Australian rugby league player
- 1993 – Crazy Mary Dobson, American wrestler
- 1993 – Sharon van Rouwendaal, Dutch swimmer
- 1994 – Yuliana Korolkova, Russian model and beauty pageant titleholder
- 1994 – Clinton Gutherson, Australian rugby league player
- 1996 – Gabby Williams, American-French basketball player
- 1998 – Jordan Nwora, Nigerian-American basketball player
- 2000 – Ricky Pearsall, American football player
- 2001 – Hailey Van Lith, American basketball player
- 2003 – Luke Hughes, American ice hockey player

== Deaths ==
=== Pre-1600 ===
- 906 – Adalbert von Babenberg, Frankish nobleman
- 1000 – Olaf I, king of Norway
- 1031 – Kang Kam-ch'an, Korean general (born 948)
- 1087 – William the Conqueror, English king (born c. 1028)
- 1191 – Conrad II, duke of Bohemia
- 1271 – Yaroslav of Tver, Russian Grand Prince (born 1230)
- 1282 – Ingrid of Skänninge, Swedish abbess and saint
- 1285 – Kunigunda of Halych, queen regent of Bohemia (born 1245)
- 1398 – James I, king of Cyprus (born 1334)
- 1435 – Robert Harling, English knight
- 1438 – Edward, king of Portugal (born 1391)
- 1487 – Chenghua, emperor of China (born 1447)
- 1488 – Francis II, duke of Brittany (born 1433)
- 1513 – Notable Scottish casualties of the Battle of Flodden
  - James IV, king of Scotland (born 1473)
  - George Douglas, Scottish nobleman (born 1469)
  - William Douglas of Glenbervie, Scottish nobleman (born 1473)
  - William Graham, 1st Earl of Montrose, Scottish politician (born 1464)
  - Alexander Lauder of Blyth, Scottish politician
  - Alexander Stewart, Scottish archbishop (born 1493)
- 1569 – Pieter Bruegel the Elder, Dutch painter (born 1525)
- 1583 – Humphrey Gilbert, English explorer and politician (born 1539)
- 1596 – Anna Jagiellon, Polish queen (born 1523)

=== 1601–1900 ===
- 1603 – George Carey, 2nd Baron Hunsdon, English politician, Lord Lieutenant of Hampshire (born 1547)
- 1611 – Eleanor de' Medici, Italian noblewoman (born 1567)
- 1612 – Nakagawa Hidenari, Japanese daimyō (born 1570)
- 1676 – Paul de Chomedey, Sieur de Maisonneuve, French soldier, founded Montreal (born 1612)
- 1680 – Henry Marten, English lawyer and politician (born 1602)
- 1703 – Charles de Saint-Évremond, French-English soldier, author, and critic (born 1610)
- 1755 – Johann Lorenz von Mosheim, German historian and author (born 1694)
- 1806 – William Paterson, Irish-American judge and politician, 2nd Governor of New Jersey (born 1745)
- 1815 – John Singleton Copley, American-English colonial and painter (born 1738)
- 1834 – James Weddell, Belgian-English sailor and navigator (born 1787)
- 1841 – Augustin Pyramus de Candolle, Swiss botanist, mycologist, and academic (born 1778)
- 1891 – Jules Grévy, French politician, 4th President of the French Republic (born 1813)
- 1893 – Friedrich Traugott Kützing, German pharmacist, botanist and phycologist (born 1807)
- 1898 – Stéphane Mallarmé, French poet and critic (born 1842)

=== 1901–present ===
- 1901 – Henri de Toulouse-Lautrec, French painter and illustrator (born 1864)
- 1907 – Ernest Wilberforce, English bishop (born 1840)
- 1909 – E. H. Harriman, American businessman and philanthropist (born 1848)
- 1910 – Lloyd Wheaton Bowers, American lawyer and politician, United States Solicitor General (born 1859)
- 1915 – Albert Spalding, American baseball player, manager, and businessman, co-founded Spalding (born 1850)
- 1923 – Hermes Rodrigues da Fonseca, Brazilian president (born 1855)
- 1934 – Roger Fry, English painter and critic (born 1866)
- 1941 – Hans Spemann, German embryologist and academic, Nobel Prize laureate (born 1869)
- 1942 – Adele Kurzweil, Austrian Holocaust victim (born 1925)
- 1943 – Carlo Bergamini, Italian admiral (born 1888)
- 1943 – Charles McLean Andrews, American historian, author, and academic (born 1863)
- 1945 – Max Ehrmann, American poet and lawyer (born 1872)
- 1950 – Victor Hémery, French racing driver (born 1876)
- 1955 – Carl Friedberg, German pianist and educator (born 1872)
- 1958 – Charlie Macartney, Australian cricketer and soldier (born 1886)
- 1959 – Ramón Fonst, Cuban fencer (born 1883)
- 1960 – Jussi Björling, Swedish tenor (born 1911)
- 1963 – Edwin Linkomies, Finnish academic, professor and the Prime Minister of Finland (born 1894)
- 1969 – Willy Mairesse, Belgian racing driver (born 1928)
- 1975 – Johannes Brenner, Estonian footballer (born 1906)
- 1975 – John McGiver, American actor (born 1913)
- 1976 – Mao Zedong, Chinese philosopher, academic, and politician, 1st Chairman of the Chinese Communist Party (born 1893)
- 1978 – Hugh MacDiarmid, Scottish linguist, poet, and author (born 1892)
- 1978 – Jack L. Warner, Canadian-American production manager and producer, co-founded Warner Bros. (born 1892)
- 1979 – Norrie Paramor, English composer, conductor, and producer (born 1914)
- 1980 – John Howard Griffin, American journalist and author (born 1920)
- 1981 – Robert Askin, Australian sergeant and politician, 32nd Premier of New South Wales (born 1907)
- 1981 – Jacques Lacan, French psychoanalyst and psychiatrist (born 1901)
- 1984 – Yılmaz Güney, Palme d'Or award-winning Kurdish film director, scenarist, actor, novelist and activist (born 1937)
- 1985 – Neil Davis, Australian photographer and journalist (born 1934)
- 1985 – Paul Flory, American chemist and engineer, Nobel Prize laureate (born 1910)
- 1985 – Antonino Votto, Italian conductor (born 1896)
- 1986 – Magda Tagliaferro, Brazilian pianist and educator (born 1893)
- 1990 – Nicola Abbagnano, Italian philosopher and academic (born 1901)
- 1990 – Samuel Doe, Liberian field marshal and politician, 21st President of Liberia (born 1951)
- 1990 – Alexander Men, Russian priest and scholar (born 1930)
- 1993 – Larry Noble, English comedian and actor (born 1914)
- 1993 – Helen O'Connell, American singer (born 1920)
- 1994 – Patrick O'Neal, American actor (born 1927)
- 1996 – Bill Monroe, American singer-songwriter (born 1911)
- 1997 – Richie Ashburn, American baseball player and sportscaster (born 1927)
- 1997 – John Hackett, Australian-English general and author (born 1910)
- 1997 – Burgess Meredith, American actor, director, and producer (born 1907)
- 1998 – Lucio Battisti, Italian singer-songwriter and guitarist (born 1943)
- 1998 – Bill Cratty, American dancer and choreographer (born 1951)
- 1999 – Arie de Vroet, Dutch footballer and manager (born 1918)
- 1999 – Catfish Hunter, American baseball player (born 1946)
- 1999 – Ruth Roman, American actress (born 1922)
- 2000 – Julian Critchley, English lawyer and politician (born 1930)
- 2001 – Ahmad Shah Massoud, Afghan commander and politician, Afghan Minister of Defense (born 1953)
- 2003 – Edward Teller, Hungarian-American physicist and academic (born 1908)
- 2003 – Don Willesee, Australian telegraphist and politician, 29th Australian Minister for Foreign Affairs (born 1916)
- 2004 – Ernie Ball, American guitarist and businessman (born 1930)
- 2004 – Caitlin Clarke, American actress (born 1952)
- 2006 – Gérard Brach, French director and screenwriter (born 1927)
- 2006 – Richard Burmer, American composer and engineer (born 1955)
- 2006 – Matt Gadsby, English footballer (born 1979)
- 2006 – William Bernard Ziff Jr., American businessman, founded Ziff Davis (born 1930)
- 2012 – Verghese Kurien, Indian engineer and businessman, founded Amul (born 1921)
- 2012 – John McCarthy, Australian footballer (born 1989)
- 2012 – Mike Scarry, American football player and coach (born 1920)
- 2012 – Ron Tindall, English footballer and manager (born 1935)
- 2013 – Sunila Abeysekera, Sri Lankan scholar and activist (born 1952)
- 2013 – Alberto Bevilacqua, Italian director and screenwriter (born 1934)
- 2013 – Saul Landau, American journalist, director, and author (born 1936)
- 2014 – Montserrat Abelló i Soler, Spanish poet and translator (born 1918)
- 2014 – Firoza Begum, Bangladeshi singer (born 1930)
- 2014 – Graham Joyce, English author and educator (born 1954)
- 2015 – Annemarie Bostroem, German poet, playwright, and songwriter (born 1922)
- 2015 – Einar H. Ingman Jr., American sergeant, Medal of Honor recipient (born 1929)
- 2015 – K. Kunaratnam, Sri Lankan physicist and academic (born 1934)
- 2024 – John Cassaday, American comic book artist and writer (born 1971)
- 2024 – James Earl Jones, American actor (born 1931)
- 2024 – Caterina Valente, Italian-French singer and dancer (born 1931)
- 2025 – Mark Norell, American vertebrate paleontologist (born 1957)

== Holidays and observances ==
- Christian feast day:
  - Charles Lowder (Church of England)
  - Ciarán of Clonmacnoise
  - Blessed Euthymia Üffing
  - Blessed Francisco Gárate Aranguren
  - Constance, Nun, and her Companions (Episcopal Church)
  - Blessed Maria Torribia
  - Our Lady of Arantzazu (Oñati, Spain; Philippines
  - Peter Claver
  - Synaxis of Ss. Joachim and Anna, an Afterfeast. (Eastern Orthodox and Eastern Catholic Churches)
  - September 9 (Eastern Orthodox liturgics)
- Armored Forces Day (Ukraine)
- California Admission Day (California, United States)
- Children's Day (Costa Rica)
- Chrysanthemum Day or Kiku no Sekku (Japan)
- Day of the Victims of Holocaust and of Racial Violence (Slovakia)
- Emergency Services Day (United Kingdom)
- Independence Day or Republic Day, celebrates the proclamation of Democratic People's Republic of Korea (North Korea) in 1948.
- Independence Day (Tajikistan), celebrates the independence of Tajikistan from USSR in 1991.
- International Buy-a-Priest-a-Beer Day
- Martyrs' Day (Afghanistan) (date may fall on September 8, follows a non-Gregorian calendar, see List of observances set by the Solar Hijri calendar)
- Remembrance for Herman the Cheruscan (The Troth)
