= Kiichirō =

- Gender: Male

Origin
- Origin: Japanese
- Meaning: Different meanings depending on the kanji used

Kiichirō, Kiichiro or Kiichirou (written: 麒一郎, 喜一郎 or 季一郎) is a masculine Japanese given name. Notable people with the name include:

- Kiichirō Furukawa (古川 麒一郎), Japanese astronomer
- Kiichiro Higuchi (樋口 季一郎) (1888–1970), Japanese general
- Hiranuma Kiichirō (平沼 騏一郎) (1867–1952), Japanese politician and Prime Minister of Japan
- Kiichiro Toyoda (豊田 喜一郎) (1894–1952), Japanese businessman and founder of Toyota Motor Corporation
- Toyonishiki Kiichiro (豊錦 喜一郎) (1920–1998), Japanese-American sumo wrestler
