= Stuart McKenzie =

Stuart McKenzie may refer to:

- Stuart McKenzie (Australian footballer) (born 1961), Australian rules footballer
- Stuart McKenzie (footballer, born 1967), English professional footballer
- Stuart McKenzie, writer and co-director of the 2017 New Zealand film The Changeover
