= Minoru Niizuma =

American sculptor (1930–1998)

- Born: September 29, 1930; Tokyo, Japan
- Died: September 5, 1998 (aged 67); East Hampton, U.S.
- Education: Tokyo National University of Fine Arts and Music
- Known for: Abstract sculptures
- Style: Abstract

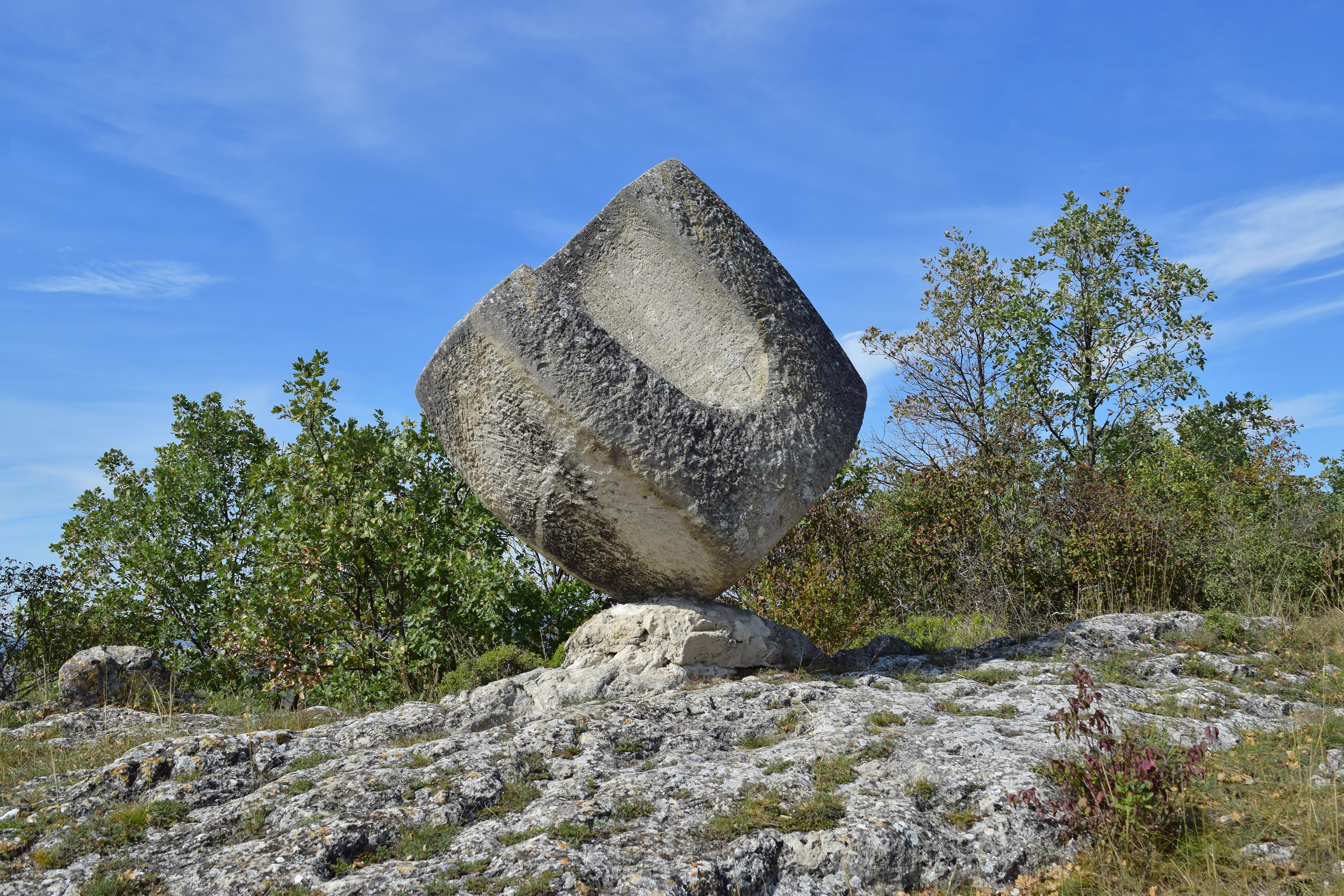
Nest, granite sculpture by Minoru Niizuma, 1969. Sankt Margarthen Sculpture Center, Burgenland, Austria

Minoru Niizuma (新妻 実, Niizuma Minoru; September 29, 1930 – September 5, 1998) was a Japanese abstract sculptor.

== Biography ==
Minoru Niizuma (新妻 実, Niizuma Minoru, Tokyo JP September 29, 1930 – East Hampton USA September 5, 1998) was a Japanese abstract sculptor.

Minoru Niizuma graduated from the Tokyo National University of Fine Arts and Music in 1955, and from 1954 through 1958 he exhibited with the Modern Art Association. Niizuma moved to New York in 1959, and from 1964 through 1970 he was an instructor at the Brooklyn Museum Art School. From 1972 through 1984, he was adjunct professor at Columbia University. Niizuma worked mostly marble, but also granite, volcanic rock and other materials. His designs would vary from geometric to organic and, sometimes, his references were reminiscent from folk art. His works show the influence of the oriental Asian tradition and the western contemporary art. The Wave's Voice, installed in the Honolulu Museum of Art, is a typical example of his work.

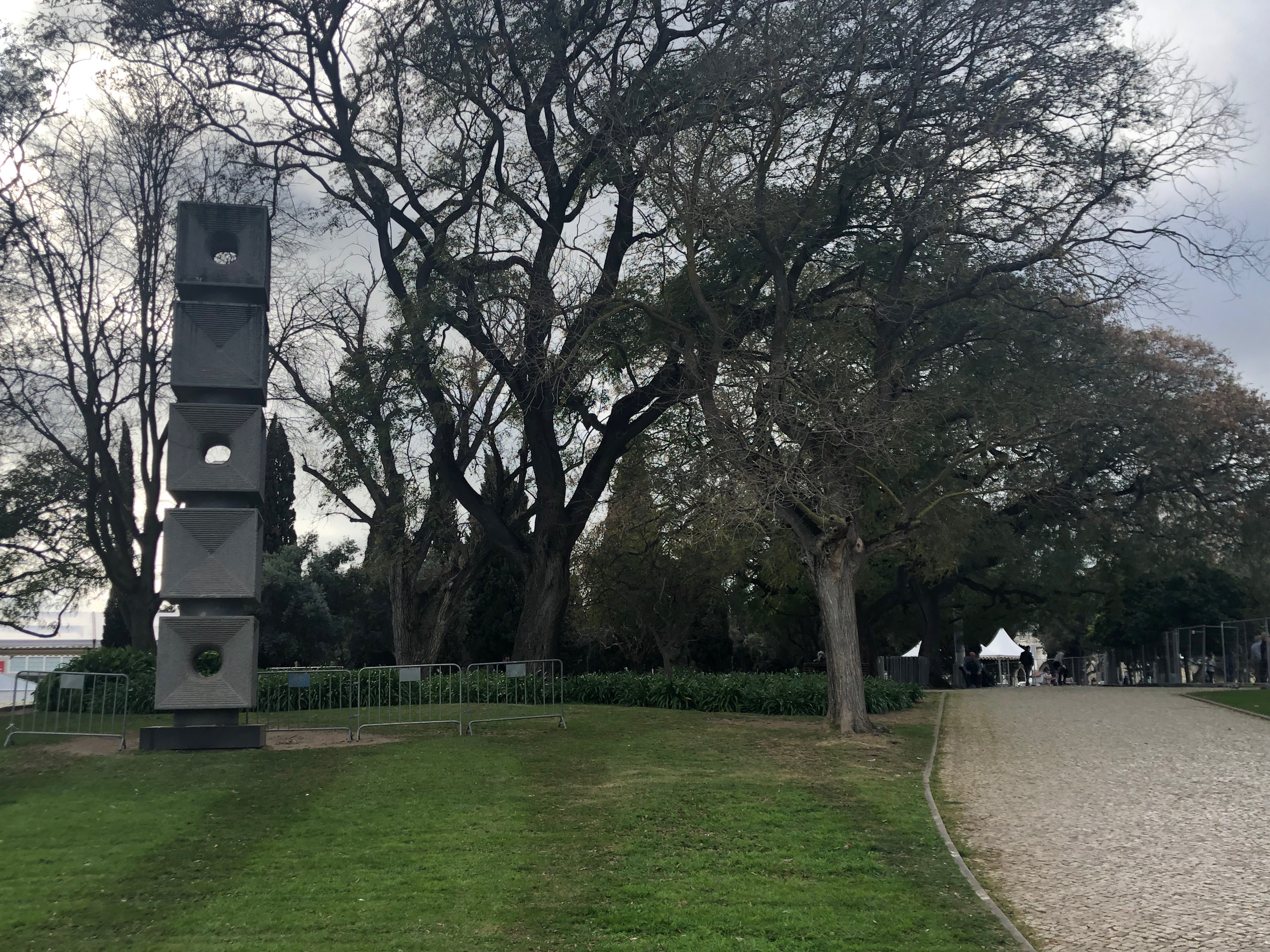
Castle of the Eye, granite sculpture by Minoru Niizuma, 1994. Lisbon, Portugal

The Hirshhorn Museum and Sculpture Garden (Washington, D. C.), the Honolulu Museum of Art and the Mie Prefectural Art Museum (Tsu City, Japan), the Museum of Modern Art (New York City), the National Museum of Modern Art (Tokyo), the Seibu Museum (Tokyo), the Solomon R. Guggenheim Museum (New York York City) and the Calouste Gulbenkian Foundation in Lisbon are among the public collections holding works by Niizuma. He participated in São Miguel Island, Azores, at an international rock sculpture symposium, creating his work "Azores" (1987), in basalt, now shown in Ponta Delgada.

== Niizuma in Portugal ==
Niizuma worked extensively in Portugal from 1981 through 1998. He was an integral figure in strengthening the cultural and artistic relationship between Portugal and Japan. He worked with the President of Portugal, Mario Soares (1986 - 1996) to bring Japanese art to the country, while also introducing many Portuguese artists to Japan.

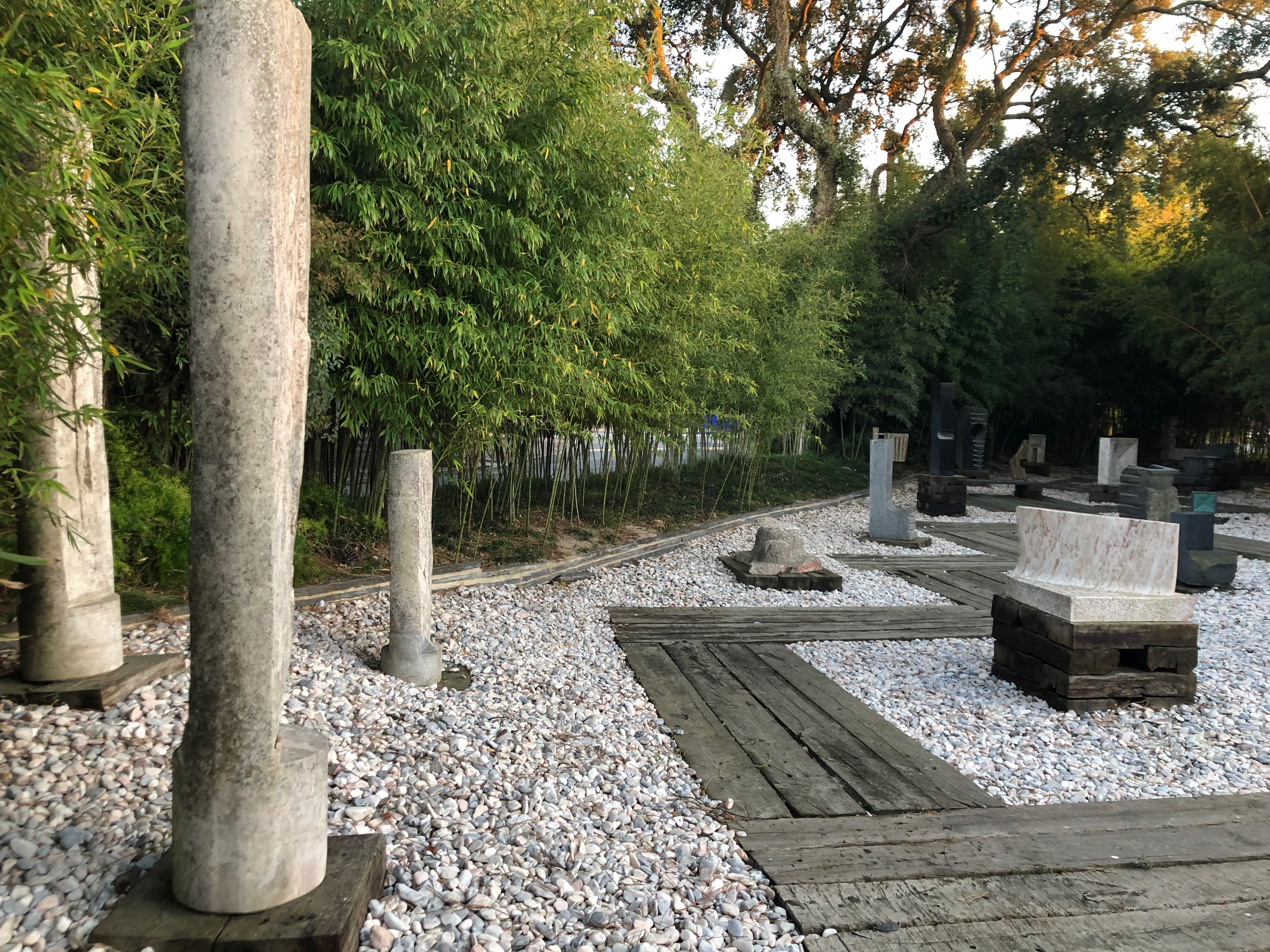
Minoru Niizuma Sculpture Garden at the Bacalhoa Winery in Azeitão, Portugal

Niizuma first came to Portugal as a member of the Évora Symposium of 1981. While there, he worked with many other prominent Portuguese artists, like João Cutileiro, Pedro Ramos and Manuel Costa Cabral. After recognizing the beautiful marble and other stones that were widely available in Portugal and having cultivated relationships with other sculptors, Niizuma continued to work in Portugal, mainly in Lisbon. In 1986, Niizuma had a full exhibition at the Calouste Gulbenkian Museum, and even today, two of his sculptures are on permanent display.

Jose Berardo, a prominent Portuguese art collector and businessman is a large collector of Niizuma's works. Niizuma had several exhibitions at the Berardo Museum in Lisbon. Today, over 30 pieces are displayed at the Minoru Niizuma Sculpture Garden located at Berardo's Bacalhoa Winery-Museum just outside of Lisbon.

His last exhibition was held in Lisbon in July 1998 at Galeria Antiks Design, "4 Japanese Living in Portugal - Nakaoka, Niizuma, Takemoto, Sakamoto", by Zambeze Almeida and Carlos Henrich.

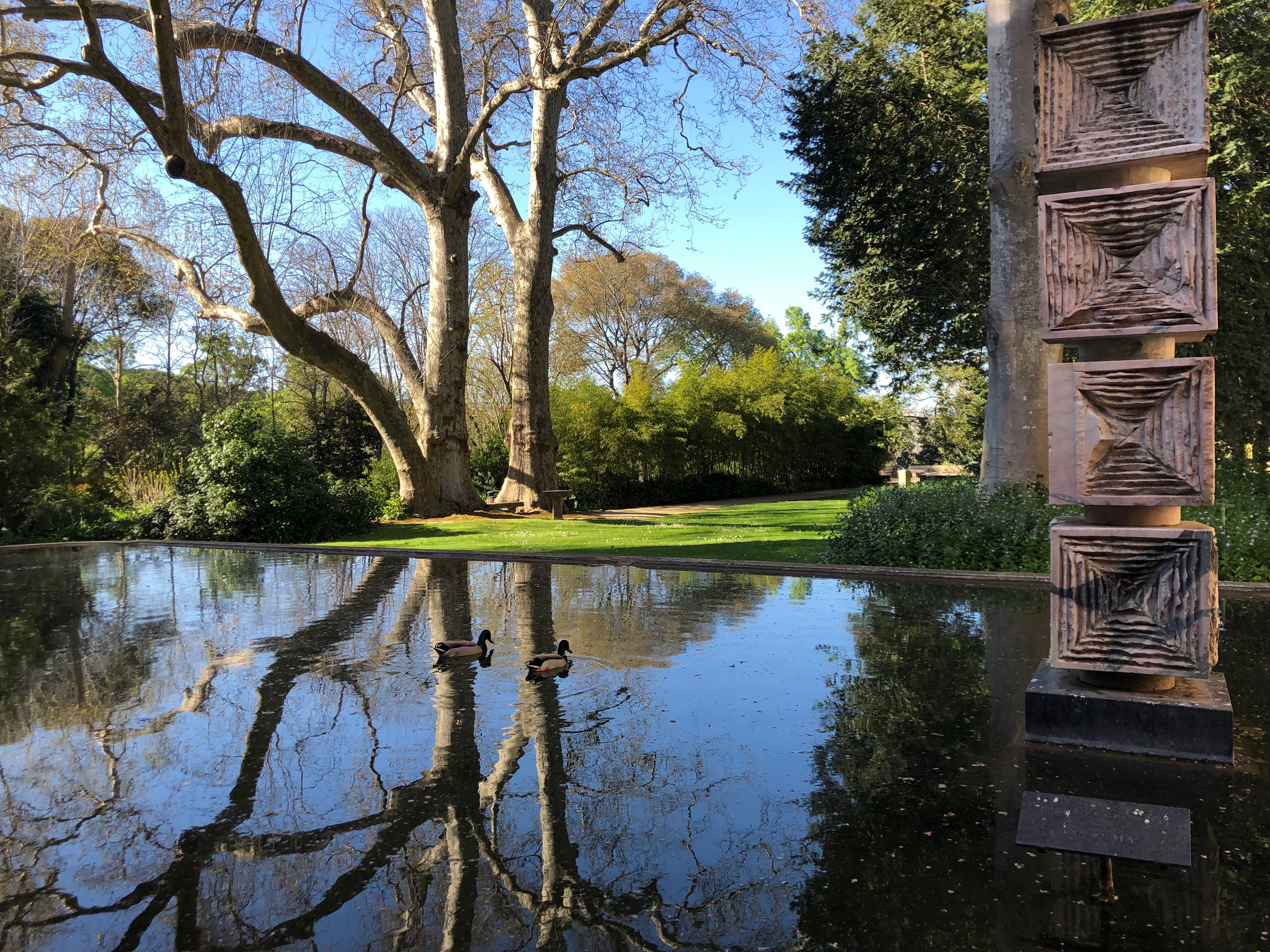
Castle of the Eye, pink marble sculpture by Minoru Niizuma, 1995. Lisbon, Portugal

== Works on view in Lisbon, Portugal ==
Niizuma has several large scale sculptures on display in public areas in Lisbon. There are some in public parks as well as in museums. They are all in serene locations and easy to view.

- The Castle of the Eye I is displayed outside the main entrance of the Contemporary Art wing of the Calouste Gulbenkian Museum and another is located in the sculpture garden, just outside of the amphitheater. Both works are from 1986.
- A Castle of the Eye of pink marble is located in the ‘Lago do Niizuma’ at the botanical gardens in Monteiro-Mor Palace, Lisbon.
- A large-scale Castle of the Eye (1994) is located in the Jardim de Belém, Lisbon.
- Over 30 pieces are located at the Bacalhoa Winery-Museum in a sculpture garden dedicated to Minoru Niizuma. A unique five piece Castle of the Eye, as well as a wide variety of smaller and medium-sized pieces are on display in this shaded garden lined with oak and bamboo trees.

== Works in the United States ==
Several of Niizuma's sculptures are viewable in United States, mainly on the East Coast. While museums like the Guggenheim, the Museum of Modern Art, and the Smithsonian all have acquired Niizuma sculptures in their permanent collection, they do not always display them. There are however, several pieces that can be seen in sculpture gardens, institutions, or campuses around the country.

- Castle of the Eye (1975) at the Annmarie Sculpture Garden and Arts Center in Solomons, MD This piece is on loan from the Smithsonian Museum in Washington, DC.
- Infinity (1985) at the Lyndhurst Campus of the Cleveland Clinic in Cleveland, OH
- Castle of the Eye (1973) at the Sydney and Walda Besthoff Sculpture Garden at the New Orleans Museum of Art
- Hollow Sea (1966) at the Williams College Sculpture Trail
- Wave's Voice (1963) at the Honolulu Academy of Arts

== Niizuma in Japan ==
Niizuma studied at the Tokyo University of Arts before moving to New York City. After establishing himself as a prominent sculptor in New York and attending several stone symposiums, Niizuma organized several himself in Japan. Niizuma organized the Iwate Symposium for several years, inviting many sculptors to complete works in Iwate, Japan.

There is a museum and sculpture garden dedicated Minoru Niizuma's works at the Sekigahara Seisakusho Company in Sekigahara, Japan.

There are also many pieces on view throughout Japan.

- Castle of the Eye (1986) in front of Hekinan City Hall
- Several pieces at DesignWater in Nagoya
- Smaller Castle of the Eye at the Chigusa Hotel in Fukuoka
- Castle of the Eye (1986) in front of Shizuoka City Hall

== Gallery ==
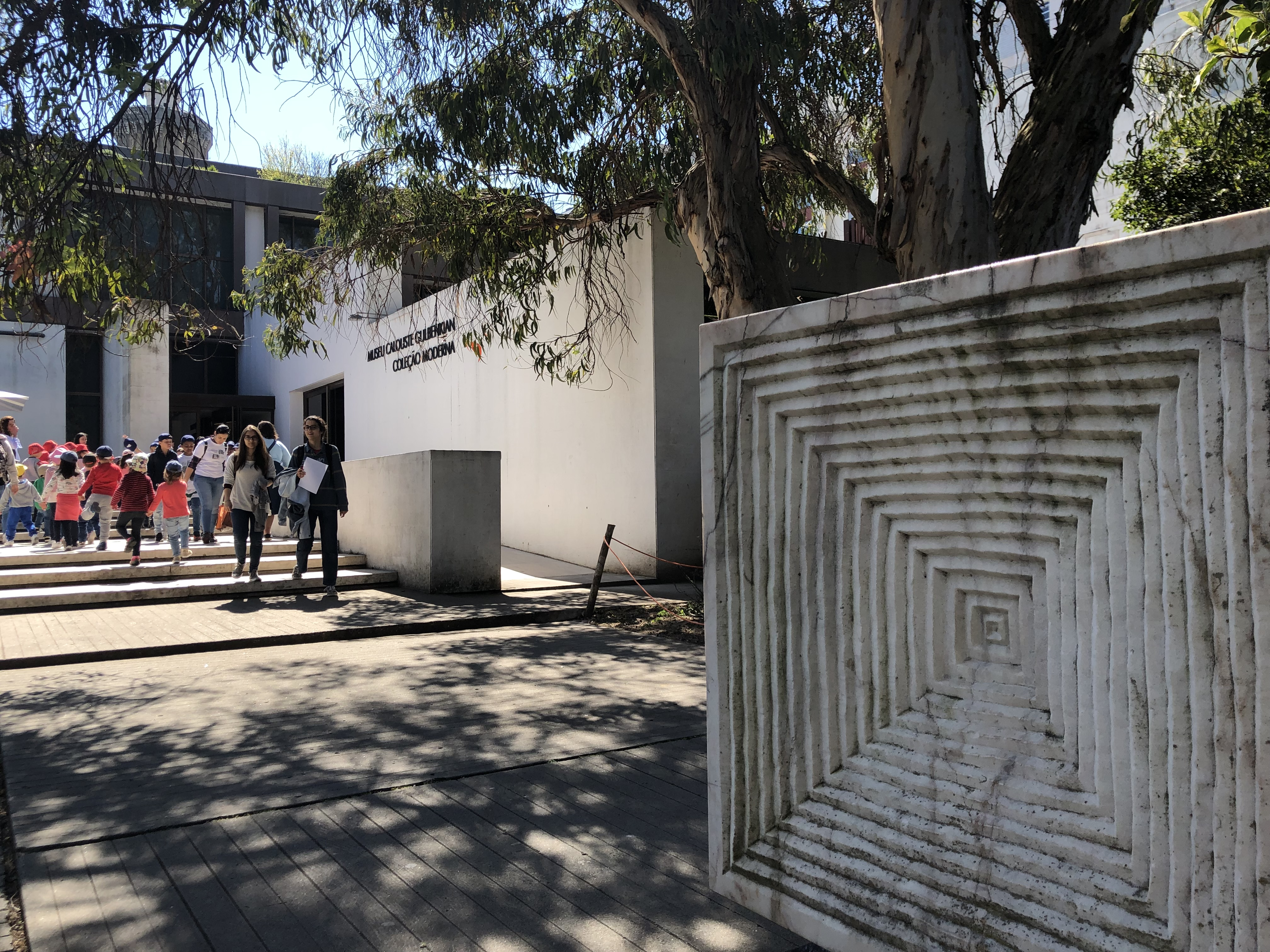
Castle of the Eye sculpture by Minoru Niizuma, 1987. Gulbenkian Museum, Lisbon, Portugal

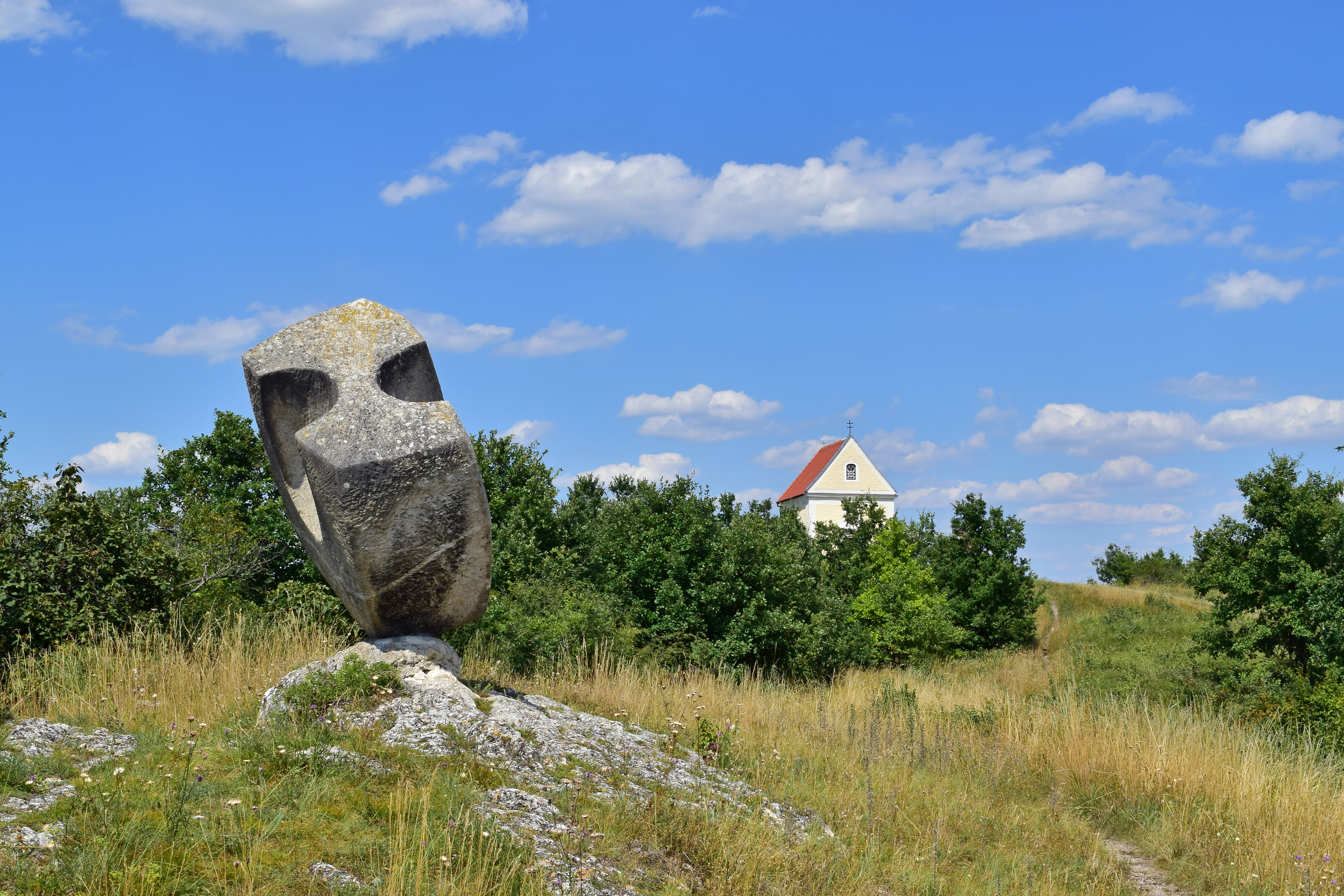
Nest in St. Margarethen, 1971

The Wave's Voice, granite sculpture by Niizuma Minoru, 1963, Honolulu Museum of Art
