= National Museum of Costume (Portugal) =

Palace in Lisbon, Lisbon District, Portugal

National Museum of Costume and Fashion
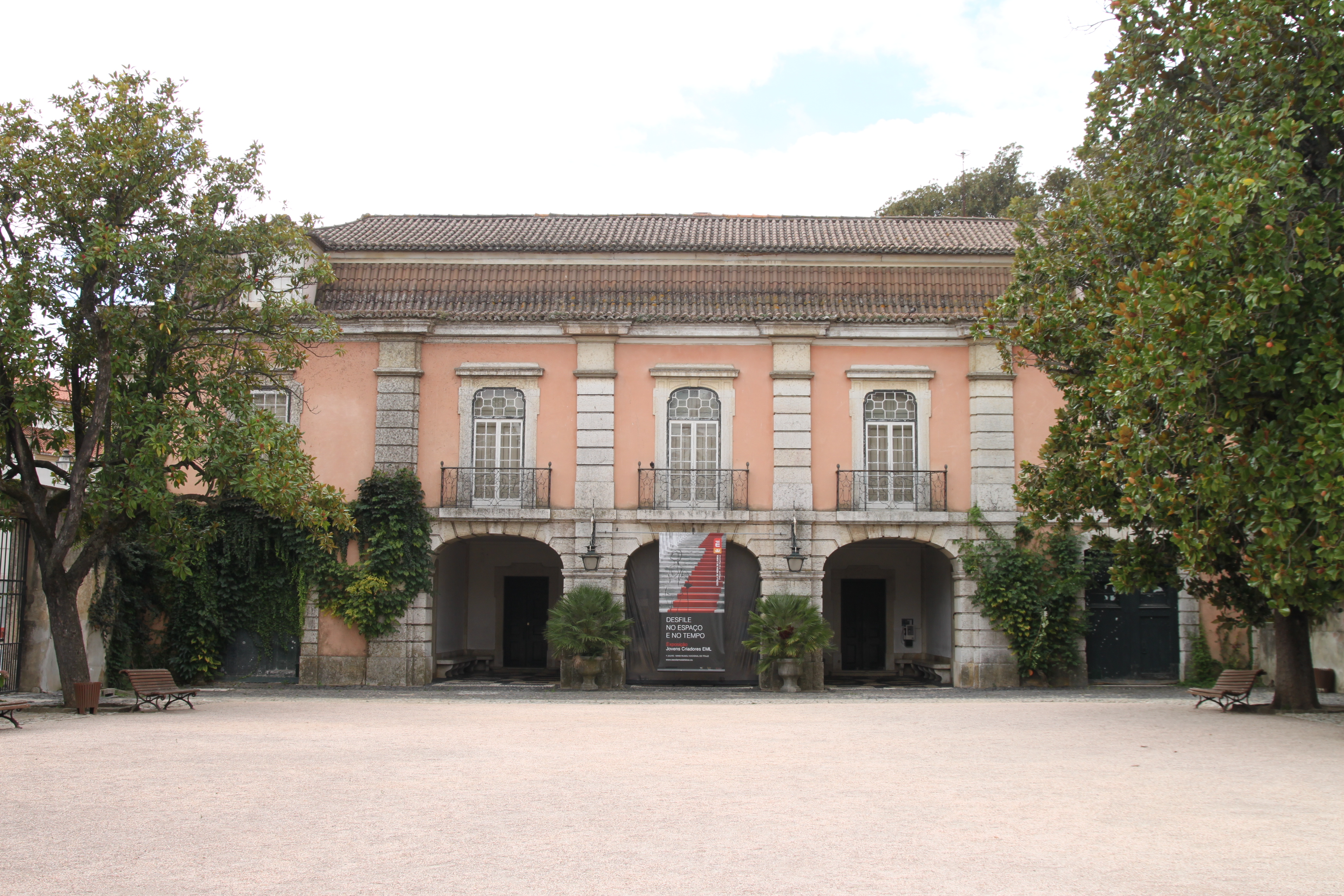
- Location: Monteiro-Mor Palace, in Lisbon, Portugal
- Coordinates: 38°46′31″N 9°09′54″W
- Type: cultural heritage
- Visitors: 26,668 (2022)
- Location of National Museum of Costume and Fashion

The Museu Nacional do Traje e da Moda is located in Monteiro-Mor Palace, in Lisbon, Portugal. It has a collection of more than 33,000 items, which includes mainly masculine and feminine costumes from the 18th and 19th centuries.
