= Nick Murphy (footballer, born 1966) =

English association football player

Personal information
- Date of birth: 22 October 1966
- Place of birth: Tadcaster, England
- Date of death: 1 September 1998 (aged 31)
- Place of death: Newton Kyme, England
- Height: 5 ft 10 in (1.78 m)
- Position: Defender

Youth career
- 1983–1984: York City

Senior career*
Years	Team	Apps	(Gls)
1984–1986	York City	0	(0)
1986–	Tadcaster Albion		
- Magnets
Total		0	(0)
- * Club domestic league appearances and goals

Nicholas John F. Murphy (22 October 1966 – 1 September 1998) was an English professional footballer who played as a defender in the Football League for York City, and in non-League football for Tadcaster Albion and Magnets.

== Career ==
Born in Tadcaster, Murphy started his career with York City's youth system in 1983 on a Youth Training Scheme. He signed a professional contract with the club in July 1984. With John MacPhail being rested, Murphy made his first team debut on 29 January 1986 in an Associate Members' Cup game at home to Hartlepool United. He was substituted for Stuart McKenzie during the game, which York went on to lose 3–2. Murphy did not make any league appearances for York before leaving the club in May 1986. He went on to play in non-League football for Tadcaster Albion and Magnets.

== Death ==
Murphy died aged 31 in a car crash involving three vehicles on the A659 at Newton Kyme, North Yorkshire on 1 September 1998.

== Career statistics ==
Club statistics
Club	Season	League			FA Cup		League Cup		Other		Total	
Club	Season	Division	Apps	Goals	Apps	Goals	Apps	Goals	Apps	Goals	Apps	Goals
York City	1985–86	Third Division	0	0	0	0	0	0	1 (Note: Appearance in Associate Members' Cup)	0	1	0
Career total			0	0	0	0	0	0	1	0	1	0
