= International Buy-A-Priest-A-Beer Day =

Annual celebration in Catholicism

International Buy-a-Priest-a-Beer Day is an annual observance on September 9 introduced by the blog The Catholic Gentleman in 2013. The premise of the holiday is that members of the Catholic laity are to buy beer for the clergy. The tradition has been linked to the invented legend of "Saint Hopswald of Aleyard – the first man to take his priest out for a beer".

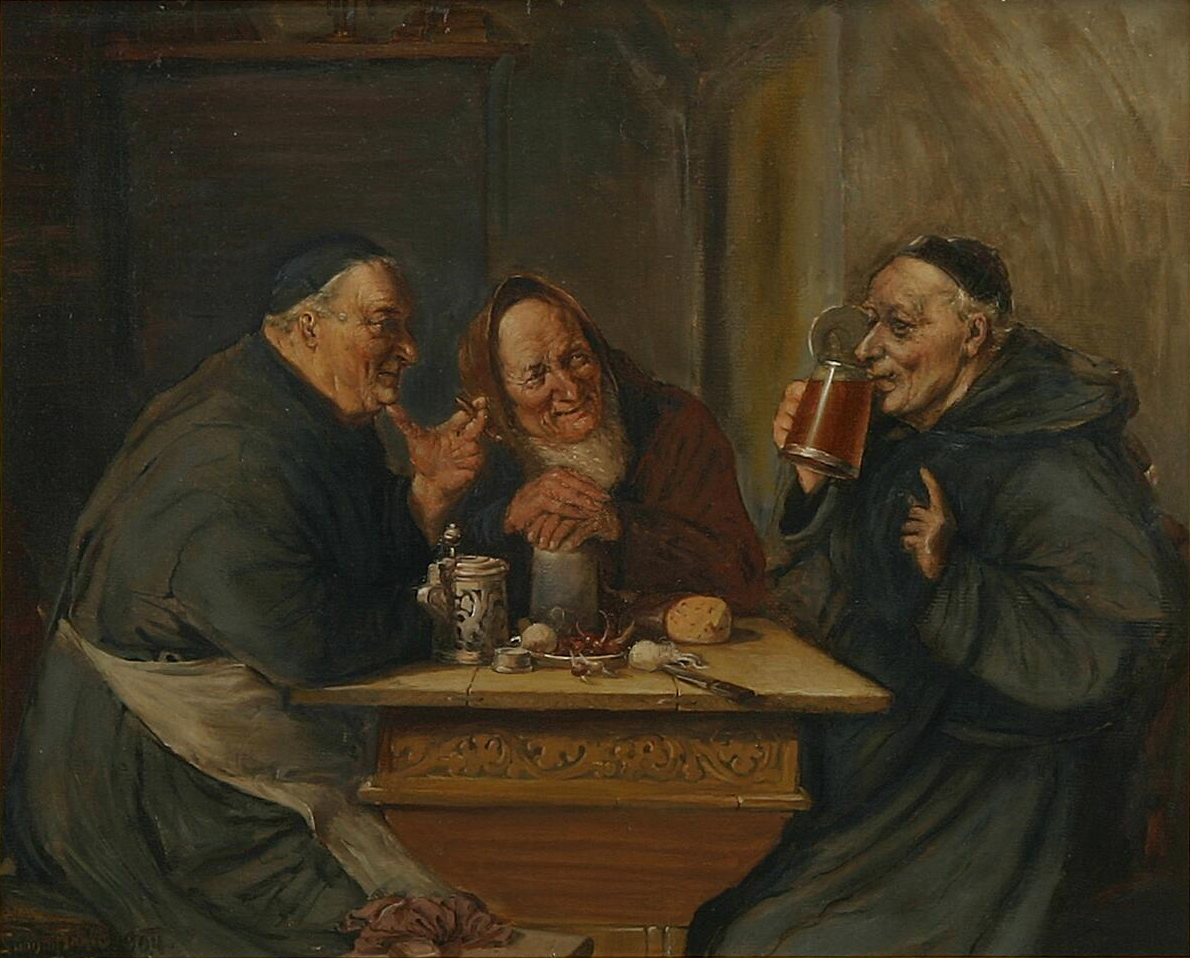
Like many other people, some members of the clergy enjoy beer.

The day was introduced by a Roman Catholic and has been promoted as a social event supporting vocations to the priesthood by Catholic parishes and dioceses. John Zuhlsdorf has recommended the priest use the blessing for beer from the old Rituale Romanum. It builds upon "Theology on Tap" events held by Catholics and other Christians since the 1980s. The day has been taken up by other Christians as well, including Anglicans in Australia, Canada, and Cyprus.

== See also ==
- Christian views on alcohol
- Trappist beer
