= Jacek Płuciennik =

Polish footballer (1970–1998)

Personal information
- Date of birth: 25 July 1970
- Place of birth: Łódź, Poland
- Date of death: 3 September 1998 (aged 28)
- Place of death: Gryźliny, Poland
- Height: 1.81 m (5 ft 11 in)
- Position: Forward

Youth career
- Widzew Łódź

Senior career*
| Years | Team | Apps | (Gls) |
| 1990–1991 | LZS Gałkówek | | |
| 1991–1992 | Boruta Zgierz | | |
| 1992–1995 | ŁKS Łódź | 95 | (19) |
| 1995–1998 | Stomil Olsztyn | 87 | (10) |
| 1998 | ŁKS Łódź | 2 | (0) |

International career
| 1994–1997 | Poland | 4 | (0) |
- * Club domestic league appearances and goals

Jacek Płuciennik (25 July 1970 – 3 September 1998) was a Polish footballer who played as a forward. He made four appearances for the Poland national team from 1994 to 1997.
