= Dominique Diroux =

Dutch footballer

Personal information
- Date of birth: 16 February 1978
- Place of birth: Neuwied, Germany
- Date of death: 28 September 1998 (aged 20)
- Place of death: Breda, Netherlands
- Position: Forward

Senior career*
Years	Team	Apps	(Gls)
1996–1998	NAC Breda	6	(0)
- * Club domestic league appearances and goals

Dominique Diroux (16 February 1978 – 28 September 1998) was a Dutch footballer who played for NAC Breda.

During a match with the NAC reserves on 28 September 1998, Diroux had to be substituted out of the game due to shortness of breath. On the sidelines, he suffered a cardiac arrest and died that same evening.
