= Albert Nemethy =

Hungarian painter (1920–1998)

- Born: Albert Szatmar Nemethy; March 31, 1920; Budapest, Hungary
- Died: September 3, 1998 (aged 78); Johnson, New York
- Citizenship: Hungarian-American
- Known for: Oil paintings of ships, steamboats, nature, portraits
- Spouse: Georgina Nemethy (m. 1944)
- Children: Albert, George, Kristina, Georgina, Julian, and Veronica
- Website: albertnemethy.com

Albert Szatmar Nemethy (Hungarian: Némethy Albert; March 31, 1920 – September 3, 1998) was a Hungarian-born American artist, noted for being one of the Hudson Valley's most legendary art figures. Art historian and author, Roderic H. Blackburn, claims that Nemethy may have "produced more paintings spanning a wider range of subjects than any other artist in the country." It is estimated that during his life he produced as many as 5,000 paintings.

Nemethy is most admired for his highly detailed steamboat paintings along with early American folk art paintings. He also painted vast landscapes in the style of Albert Bierstadt, along with still lifes, numerous portraits, houses and castles, and historical images.

== Early life ==
Nemethy was born to a Jewish family in a rural area outside of Budapest, Hungary, in 1920. His father was an insurance salesman and his mother a homemaker. Although she was a talented fine artist, she never took it up professionally. Others in his family were musicians, with one widely known throughout Hungary.

Nemethy's earliest memories of becoming interested in art were when he was the age of four. He did a drawing of his dog that so impressed his parents, they showed it to Pugan, a noted artist in Budapest. Pugan at first couldn't believe it was done by a four-year-old, and took young Nemethy under his wing to teach him the fundamentals of drawing and painting. Nemethy did his first serious painting in a style of his own when he was 15, and soon after enrolled in the Hungarian National Academy in Budapest to study art. He had been blind in his left eye since an early age.

From that time on, he said "all I was interested in was art," although his parents were against him wanting to become an artist. They felt the life of an artist would be difficult, making it hard to earn a steady income. "I had a hard time with my parents over this," he recalls.

His plans changed suddenly when in 1940, the Nazis invaded Hungary and occupied the country, making it a member of the Axis powers. Nemethy went into hiding because he and his fiancé were Jewish. They couldn't walk the streets, and were always afraid they would be caught.

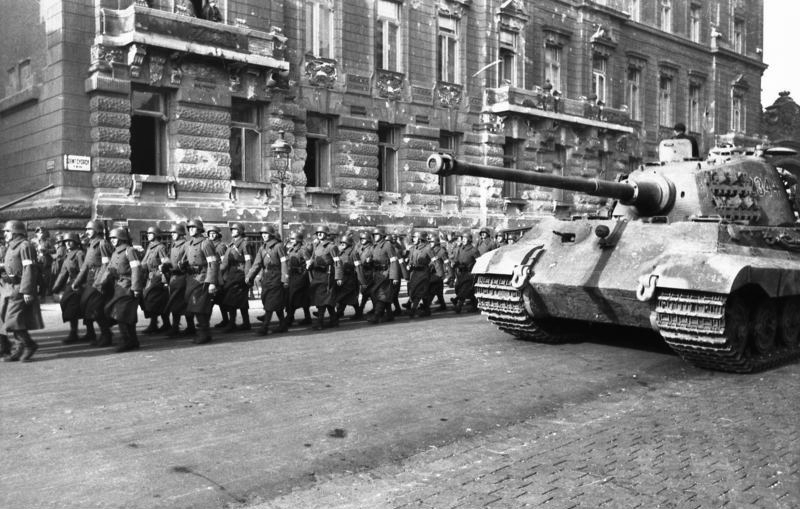
Nazis occupy Budapest, 1944

In 1944 Hungary was next invaded by the Soviet army to fight the Germans. Nemethy's family lived in the middle of the war zone between the two armies. He recalls, "One side of Budapest was occupied by the Germans and the other side by the Russians, and they were fighting and between that was our place," under heavy bombardment. He nearly lost his life when a bomb hit the building he was in which collapsed around him, but left him untouched. "That was a miracle," he said.

Another close call came when the Hungarian Nazis took him and the other students into the school courtyard. He sensed the danger immediately, telling a friend "something is not kosher." He then realized that everyone was to be executed. "It's a miracle how I got out," he says. He and his friend first hid on the floor covered with hay. They then managed to sneak themselves outside the courtyard which was surrounded by soldiers.

When the Soviets finally defeated the Germans in March, 1945, Nemethy suffered through similar close calls on his life. Because he was not a member of the trade union, he was arrested by the Russians but eventually escaped. He was back on the streets trying to create and sell art, now having joined the official artist union in order to display his work. However, his artwork was rejected by the Communists as unacceptable and he was again forced into hiding. He considered leaving the country: "I came to the decision to do something because I could not handle this situation any more. It was not safe on the street." He began planning his "escape" to the West, to either England or America.

== Escape from Hungary ==
In 1947 he married his fiancé, Georgina, and they managed to get a passport. They applied for a visa to enter England. After a long wait and never receiving approval, he decided to cross the border illegally. "We were losing our patience," he said. They escaped by walking along a river bank up to their waist in water, with his wife carrying their first born son, Julian. They eventually made it to Austria, then to Germany, where they spent two years living in a refugee camp outside of Munich, still waiting for a visa to enter England.

Nemethy continued painting during his years in the camp and managed to earn enough to get by.

I was painting all the time, absolutely. I was selling my paintings in the refugee camp. Yes, and I still was painting while waiting for the visa to go to England.

Nemethy entered his paintings in a show at the Munich Academy where he won "First Prize" out of 600 other artists. By 1950 he realized that he could remain in Germany and succeed as an artist, but also learned that visas to the United States were easier to come by. They went to the U.S. and settled in Montclair, New Jersey.

== Career in the U.S. ==
An Albert Nemethy steamboat painting

In New Jersey, he took his first full-time job at a framing shop but continued his painting at home. They sold, but very slowly. "I was selling my paintings at first for $5 a piece in New York City."After years of selling paintings his works became recognized by collectors on Park Avenue, and his income improved. In the mid-1950s he moved his family to the Chelsea Hotel, closer to the galleries now carrying his work. He became friends with Willem de Kooning, another artist staying at the hotel. But after a year he was still earning less than he needed to live on, especially now with four children to support. They then moved to 74th street, in the Yorkville area.

His living situation became more dire, however. "After that year, now starts the real hardship,"he says. They rented an apartment and he began painting constantly, with no other income. "In that apartment,"he recalls, "I was so down I was not able to pay the rent for two months, and the police took me out to the street with six children. I don't know what happened." He later purchased a lot in the small town of Washingtonville, 40 miles north, for only $5, hoping to build his own house. In the interim, they lived on the land but were later evicted for violating zoning laws: "We were out under the sky. When the rain came we had had a little shack, a little roof, and I was hiding under there . . . trying to sell paintings. Oh, it was very hard."The police evicted and jailed him, and his wife and children were sent north to stay with friends in Hunter, New York.

He eventually settled in rural Newburgh, New York, on the Hudson River, where he established himself as a well-known artist over the next ten years. During the 1960s his notability increased as he did commissions for various businesses and non-profit organizations. He painted murals, portraits of notable figures, and paintings of 19th century steamboats, which were a common sight at the time on the river. The steamboat paintings were popular so he continued painting them to satisfy a growing demand.

By the 1970s Nemethy's paintings were becoming well-known in New York City. His works were being sold there with equal billing by galleries selling works by James Bard, a 19th century painter of similar marine settings and steamboats. In a show called "The Heritage of the Sea", his paintings of ships and other boats hung alongside 19th century ones, with one reviewer stating that "it's often hard to tell the difference, for the recent painters often like to reinvigorate a glorious past."

Painting of Rocky Mountains with Native Americans, after Albert Bierstadt's 1863 painting, "The Rocky Mountains, Lander's Peak"

In the 1980s his rural location inspired him to paint landscapes in the style of the Hudson River School of artists. He also painted large landscapes with native American themes in the style of Albert Bierstadt, a 19th-century artist noted for his sweeping paintings of the American West. Nemethy's paintings attracted the attention of the West Point Museum, which commissioned him to paint historical battle scenes and restore older paintings in their collection. Lilac Gallery, which has carried his works, includes a description of his American West theme:

Albert greatly admired the extraordinary views of the imposing Rockies. His enthusiasm for these scenes became his driving passion. These works received a great deal of interest and enthusiasm. They were even more successfully received than his portraits, landscapes, and still-lifes.

He was diagnosed with colon cancer in 1993 and later lost vision in one of his eyes until it was successfully operated on. After a partial recovery, he undertook painting a series of works based on the Ten Commandments, four of which were reprinted by the United Nations. The subject was close to his heart, he admits: "People are always asking things from God. I think that is shameful. I say you have nothing but to give thanks to God every day and every minute...That is why the Ten Commandments are so important."
