= Col Costorphin =

Australian cricketer

Personal information
- Full name: Colin James Corstorphin
- Born: 20 July 1954; Melbourne, Australia
- Died: 4 September 1998 (aged 44)
- Batting: Right-handed
- Bowling: Right arm fast-medium
- Role: Bowler

Domestic team information
- Years: Team
- 1977-1978: Victoria
- Source: Cricinfo, 5 December 2015

Col Costorphin (20 July 1954 – 4 September 1998) was an Australian cricketer. A seam bowler, he took four or five wickets in each of his three first-class matches for Victoria between 1977 and 1978.

== See also ==
- List of Victoria first-class cricketers
