= Toyonishiki Kiichiro =

Japanese-American sumo wrestler (1920–1998)

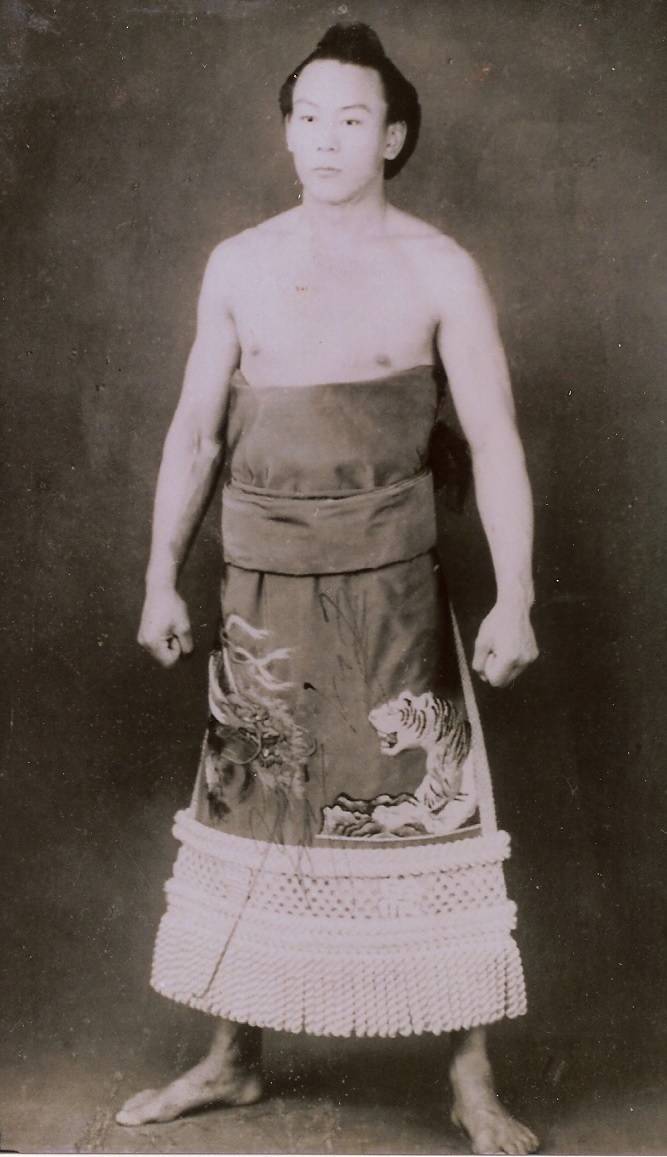

Personal information
- Native name: 豊錦 喜一郎
- Born: Harley Ozaki; 3 February 1920 Pierce, Colorado, U.S.
- Died: 26 September 1998 (aged 78) Tokyo, Japan
- Height: 1.88 m (6 ft 2 in)
- Weight: 96 kg (212 lb)

Sport
- Sport: Sumo
- Retired: November, 1945
- Heya: Dewanoumi
- Record: 74-51
- Debut: January, 1938
- Highest rank: Maegashira 17 (November, 1945)

Toyonishiki Kiichiro (born Harley Ozaki, 3 February 1920 – 26 September 1998) was an American-born Japanese sumo wrestler from Pierce, Colorado who was one of the first foreign-born wrestlers to reach the top makuuchi division. He made his professional debut in January 1938 and reached makuuchi in May 1944, nearly 25 years before the more well known Hawaiian born Takamiyama Daigoro. However, he fought in only one tournament in the top division before being drafted into the Imperial Japanese Army against his wishes, and he never returned to sumo. He remained in Japan after the war, and ran an inn later in life.

== Career ==
He was born as Harley Ozaki in Pierce, Colorado, although he was to list Chikujō, Fukuoka as his birthplace on the banzuke ranking sheets. He joined Dewanoumi stable in January 1938. He had been introduced to the stable by a relative during a visit to Japan. Initially he knew nothing about sumo, assuming that the sand covered clay dohyō was made of concrete.

He was the fifth Japanese-American in sumo and the first to reach elite sekitori status. He never had a losing score in his eight years in sumo. He was promoted to the second jūryō division in January 1943 and reached the top makuuchi division in May 1944. He scored six wins against four losses, but this was to be his last tournament before being drafted into the Japanese army.

He still had American citizenship and had really wanted to fight for the United States, but as he could not return to the US he agreed to change his citizenship at the urging of the Japan Sumo Association. He adopted the Japanese name of Kiichiro Ozaki.

He survived the war but decided not to return to sumo, believing he could make a better living as an interpreter for the US forces. He regained his US citizenship and in his later years ran a ryokan in Tokyo with his wife.

== Career record ==
- Through most of the 1940s only two tournaments were held a year.

Toyonishiki Kiichiro
-	Spring Haru basho, Tokyo	Summer Natsu basho, Tokyo	Autumn Aki basho, Tokyo
1938	(Maezumo)	East Jonokuchi #10; 4–3	Not held
1939	East Jonidan #18; 4–3	West Sandanme #36; 5–3	Not held
1940	East Sandanme #15; 4–4	East Sandanme #8; 6–2	Not held
1941	West Makushita #21; 5–3	West Makushita #12; 5–3	Not held
1942	West Makushita #5; 4–4	West Makushita #4; 5–3	Not held
1943	West Jūryō #14; 8–7	East Jūryō #9; 10–5	Not held
1944	West Jūryō #1; 8–7	West Maegashira #20; 6–4	In army
1945	Not held	In army	East Maegashira #17; Retired –
Record given as win-loss-absent Top Division Champion Top Division Runner-up Retired Lower Divisions Key: ★=Kinboshi(s); d=Draw(s) (引分); h=Hold(s) (預り); Divisions: Makuuchi — Jūryō — Makushita — Sandanme — Jonidan — Jonokuchi Makuuchi ranks: Yokozuna — Ōzeki — Sekiwake — Komusubi — Maegashira

== See also ==
- Glossary of sumo terms
- List of past sumo wrestlers
