= Pierce, Colorado =

Town in Colorado, United States

Town of Pierce, Colorado
- Town
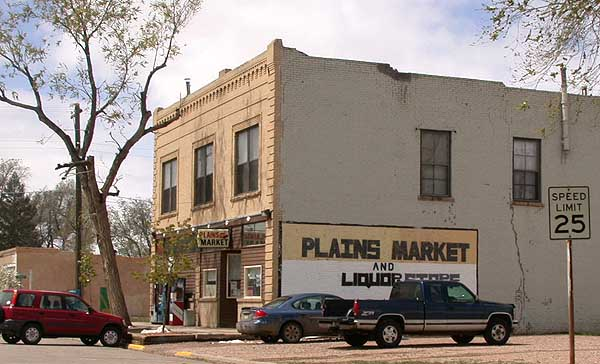
- Grocery store on Main Street in Pierce, Colorado

- Location of Pierce in Weld County, Colorado.
- Coordinates: 40°38′35″N 104°45′46″W
- Country: United States
- State: Colorado
- County: Weld
- Founded: 1869
- Incorporated (town): August 30, 1918

Government
  - Type: Statutory Town

Area
  - Total: 1.86 sq mi (4.81 km^{2})
  - Land: 1.86 sq mi (4.81 km^{2})
  - Water: 0 sq mi (0.00 km^{2})
- Elevation: 5,092 ft (1,552 m)

Population (2020)
  - Total: 1,097
  - Density: 591/sq mi (228/km^{2})
- Time zone: UTC-7 (MST)
  - Summer (DST): UTC-6 (MDT)
- ZIP code: 80650
- Area code: 970
- FIPS code: 08-59005
- GNIS feature ID: 2413129
- Website: piercecolo.gov

Pierce is a Statutory Town in Weld County, Colorado, United States. The population was 1,097 at the 2020 census. The town is a rural agricultural community located on the Colorado Eastern Plains along U.S. Highway 85 north of Greeley.

== History ==
A post office called Pierce has been in operation since 1903. The town was named after John Pierce, a railroad official.

== Geography ==
According to the United States Census Bureau, the town has a total area of 0.7 square miles (1.8 km^{2}), all of it land.

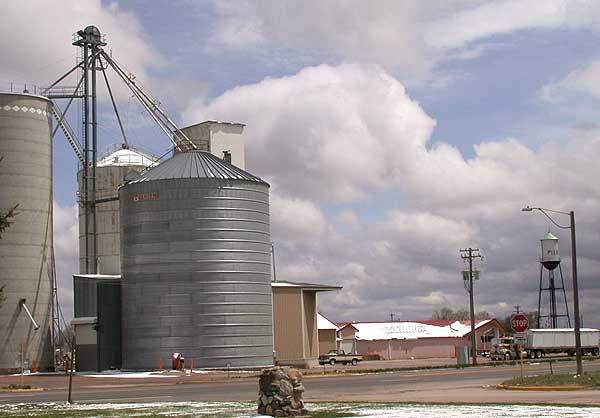
Grain elevator and water tower along U.S. Highway 85 in Pierce, Colorado

== Demographics ==
Historical population
Census	Pop.	Note	%±
1920	327		—
1930	281		−14.1%
1940	343		22.1%
1950	372		8.5%
1960	424		14.0%
1970	452		6.6%
1980	878		94.2%
1990	823		−6.3%
2000	884		7.4%
2010	834		−5.7%
2020	1,097		31.5%

=== 2020 census ===
As of the 2020 census, Pierce had a population of 1,097. The median age was 35.0 years. 28.8% of residents were under the age of 18 and 13.0% of residents were 65 years of age or older. For every 100 females there were 105.8 males, and for every 100 females age 18 and over there were 102.9 males age 18 and over.

0.0% of residents lived in urban areas, while 100.0% lived in rural areas.

There were 399 households in Pierce, of which 41.1% had children under the age of 18 living in them. Of all households, 58.1% were married-couple households, 18.8% were households with a male householder and no spouse or partner present, and 16.8% were households with a female householder and no spouse or partner present. About 21.0% of all households were made up of individuals and 8.1% had someone living alone who was 65 years of age or older.

There were 426 housing units, of which 6.3% were vacant. The homeowner vacancy rate was 3.0% and the rental vacancy rate was 10.8%.

Racial composition as of the 2020 census
Race	Number	Percent
White	851	77.6%
Black or African American	0	0.0%
American Indian and Alaska Native	8	0.7%
Asian	5	0.5%
Native Hawaiian and Other Pacific Islander	0	0.0%
Some other race	122	11.1%
Two or more races	111	10.1%
Hispanic or Latino (of any race)	281	25.6%

== See also ==
- Front Range Urban Corridor
- North Central Colorado Urban Area
- Denver-Aurora-Boulder, CO Combined Statistical Area
- Greeley, CO Metropolitan Statistical Area
