= Monteiro-Mor Palace =

Coordinates: 38°45′54″N 9°9′32.4″W

- Palácio do Monteiro-Mor (Portuguese)
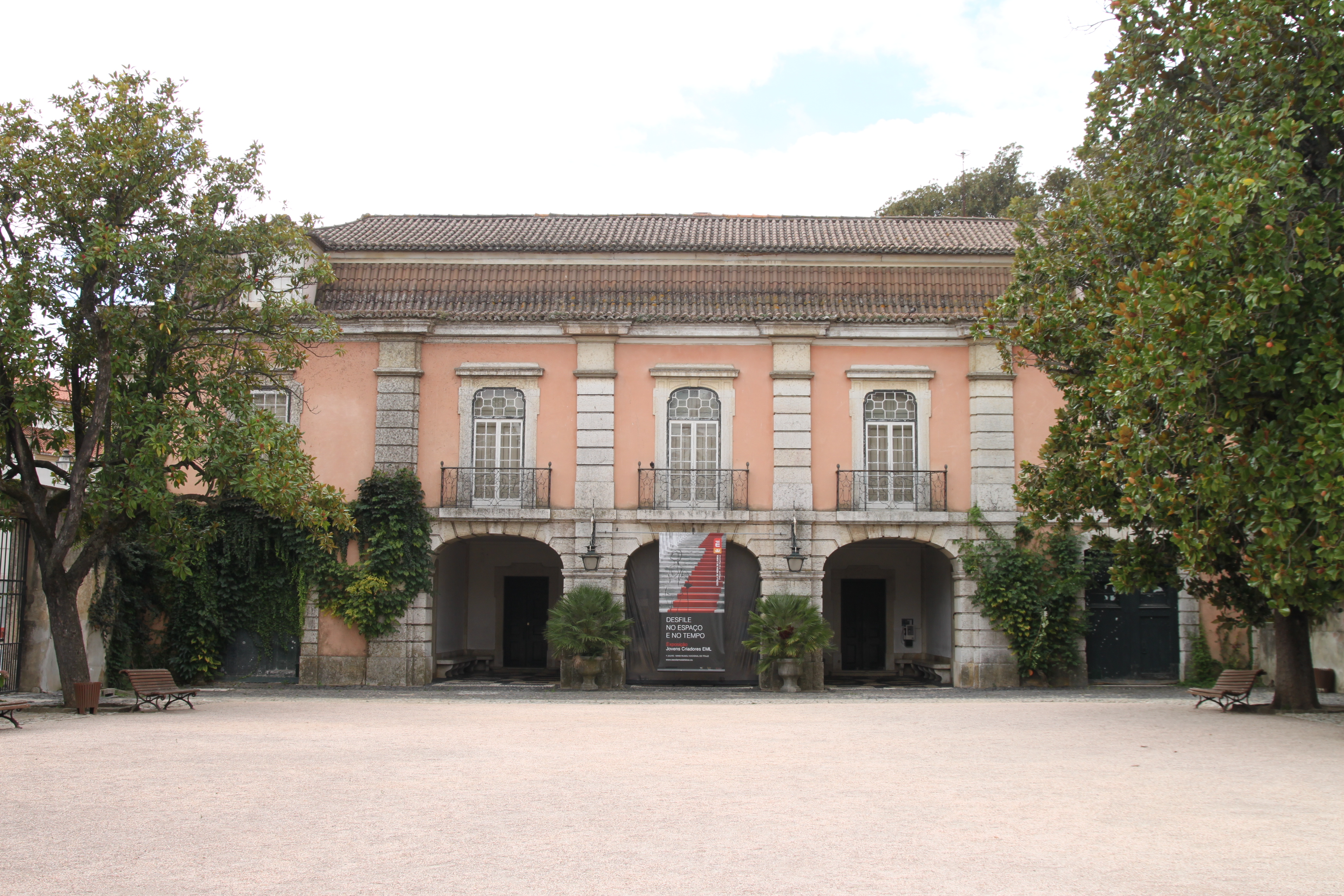
- Monteiro-Mor Palace

- Location within Portugal
- Location: Lisbon, Portugal

Portuguese National Monument
- Official name: Palácio do Monteiro-Mor, Edifícios Anexos, Jardins
- Type: Property of Interest

The Monteiro-Mor Palace (Portuguese: Palácio do Monteiro-Mor) is a Portuguese palace located in Lisbon, Portugal.

== History ==
Monteiro-Mor Palace is located in the Lumiar parish in Lisbon.

The name of the palace dates back to the 18th century when the High Huntsman of the Royal House (Portuguese: Monteiro-Mor) D. Henrique de Noronha and his wife D. Fernao Telles da Silva occupied the palace.

The Portuguese National Museum of Costume and Fashion is currently installed in the palace.

The palace is surrounded by an eleven hectare botanical garden.

== Sources ==
- Palácio do Monteiro-Mor
