= István Bezegh-Huszágh =

Hungarian fencer

Personal information
- Born: 8 June 1913 Sopron, Austria-Hungary
- Died: 7 September 1998 (aged 85) São Paulo, Brazil

Sport
- Sport: Fencing

István Bezegh-Huszágh (8 June 1913 – 7 September 1998) was a Hungarian fencer. He competed in the team épée event at the 1936 Summer Olympics.
