= Søren Andersen (footballer, born 1925) =

Danish footballer

Personal information
- Date of birth: 19 December 1925
- Date of death: 23 September 1998 (aged 72)
- Position: Forward

Senior career*
Years	Team	Apps	(Gls)
- Esbjerg fB
- * Club domestic league appearances and goals

Søren Andersen (19 December 1925 – 23 September 1998) was a Danish footballer. He was part of Denmark's squad at the 1952 Summer Olympics, but he did not play in any matches.
