= John Woyat =

Canadian gridiron football player (1933–1998)

Profile
- Position: Fullback

Personal information
- Born: February 3, 1933; Vancouver, British Columbia
- Died: September 16, 1998 (aged 65); Vancouver, British Columbia
- Listed height: 5 ft 8 in (1.73 m)
- Listed weight: 178 lb (81 kg)

Career information
- College: Oregon

Career history
- 1955–1957: Edmonton Eskimos

Awards and highlights
- Grey Cup champion (1955, 1956)

John Alexander Woyat (February 3, 1933 – September 16, 1998) was a Canadian professional football player who played for the Edmonton Eskimos. He won the Grey Cup with the Eskimos in 1955 and 1956. Woyat played football previously with the University of Oregon.
