= Stuart McKenzie (footballer, born 1967) =

English association footballer (born 1967)

Personal information
- Full name: Stuart Ronald McKenzie
- Date of birth: 19 September 1967 (age 59)
- Place of birth: Hull, East Riding of Yorkshire, England
- Height: 5 ft 11 in (1.80 m)
- Position: Defender

Youth career
- 1984–1985: York City

Senior career*
Years	Team	Apps	(Gls)
1985–1988	York City	32	(0)
1988–????	Bridlington Trinity		
- Guiseley
- Hall Road Rangers
- Guiseley
- North Ferriby United
1995	Lincoln United		
1995	Ossett Town		
1995–????	Brigg Town		
Total		32+	(0+)
- * Club domestic league appearances and goals

Stuart Ronald McKenzie (born 19 September 1967) is an English former professional footballer who played as a defender in the Football League for York City and in non-League football for Bridlington Trinity, Guiseley, Hall Road Rangers, North Ferriby United, Lincoln United, Ossett Town and Brigg Town.
