= Bill Cratty =

American modern dancer and choreographer (1951–1998)

- Born: February 28, 1951; Cleveland, Ohio
- Died: September 9, 1998 (aged 47); London, United Kingdom
- Occupations: Dancer, choreographer

Bill Cratty (February 28, 1951 – September 9, 1998) was an American modern dancer and choreographer.

== Life and career ==
Born William Anthony Cratty in Cleveland, Ohio, Bill Cratty began his dance training with tap and gymnastics lessons at the age of 5. He stopped his lessons (according to him, because too much practice was required; according to his mother, because Cratty's brothers teased him about dance) and did not resume dancing until high school, when he became involved in the school musical productions. Cratty went on to attend Ohio University where he received a BFA in dance in 1973.

The six-foot one-inch tall Cratty joined the José Limón Dance Company in 1974, achieved soloist status, and performed for eight years in works by Limón, Charles Weidman, Anna Sokolow, Doris Humphrey and others. He also studied with Ruth Currier, Murray Louis and Daniel Nagrin, whose jazzy style influenced Cratty's choreography.

Cratty's first major choreographic work, "The Kitchen Table", was given its New York premier by the José Limón Company in 1981, at City Center Theater. "The Kitchen Table" was called "a seminal dance work of the 20th century" and "an antidote to post-modernism" by the dance critic Walter Terry.

In 1982, Cratty left the Limón Company to form his own company, the "Bill Cratty Dance Theatre", which toured internationally and presented eight New York seasons. In 1986, the Company appeared at the Kennedy Center in Washington, D.C.. In New York City, the company performed at the Riverside Church Theater, the 92nd Street Y, and the Joyce Theater.

Cratty was the recipient of three National Endowment for the Arts Choreographer's Fellowships.

One of the foremost teachers of Limón technique, Cratty held guest positions on the faculties of colleges and universities throughout America including University of California at Santa Barbara, University of Illinois at Urbana-Champaign and Harvard. He set his works on several companies including Ballet Rambert, Hubbard Street Dance Company, and other regional American groups. He appeared on Broadway in the musical, Jerome Robbins' Broadway. He also performed with Mikhail Baryshnikov's White Oak Dance Project.

In 1993 Cratty joined the faculty of the Laban Dance Centre in London where he also directed the Transitions Dance Company.

Cratty died, at the age of 47, of liver cancer at his home in London on September 9, 1998.

Since his death, each year the Ohio University School of Dance presents the Bill Cratty Award, a scholarship in Cratty's honor, to a male undergraduate dance major.

== Choreographic and performance style ==
Cratty's work was considered traditional, mainstream, modern dance by critics and was unique in the 1980s when postmodern, minimal, abstract dance was becoming popular. Cratty frequently voiced his desire to make dances that entertained. His choreography was praised for its sense of humor, narrative, and humanity. Cratty noted in interviews that even as a child he loved the movies of Fred Astaire and Gene Kelly and often his works were seen as a hybrid of concert dance and musical theatre, combining elements of both with mime and comedy. Dance Magazine noted "the simultaneous effect of a postmodern contemporary outlook coupled with an old-fashioned modern dance sensibility" in his works. As a performer, Cratty was called "pure and concentrated," and "a sensuous and virile dancer" who possessed "extraordinary stage presence" by Anna Kisselgoff of the New York Times.

== Selected choreographic works ==
Bill Cratty

- The Kitchen Table (1980) Music: Baby Dodds
- Le Bourgeois Gentilhomme (1982) Music: French popular tunes from the 1950s
- Promenades (1982) Music: Haydn, Glenn Miller, et al.
- Match, Music: Schubert Trout Quintet
- Opus No. 3, Music: Satie, et al.
- Prince of the Air (1984) Music: Stravinsky Octet for Wind Instruments
- Englewood (1984) Music: Pee Wee Russell
- The Beethoven Quintet (1986) Music: Beethoven
- Salome (1986) Music: Galt MacDermot
- Muggsy (1987) Music: Muggsy Spanier
- Going Bananas (1987) Music: Peter Zummo
- Andante Favori (1987) Music: Beethoven
- Down In The Hole (1995)
- Don't Be That Way (1996)
- Rebound (1997)

== Critical acclaim ==
- "Mr. Cratty is an authoritative and intelligent dancer with lots of stage presence, qualities his choreography shares. What a rarity it is to see dance today that looks as if it knew where it were going, even when, as was the case here, it is full of surprises."

–Jennifer Dunning, The New York Times, January 19, 1982

- "Cratty's distinctive style is forged from a love of the pure, kinetic drive of dance combined with an enthusiasm for gymnastics. The result is movement that's free-spirited and taut, whimsical and entertaining."

-Deirdre Kelly, The Globe and Mail, January 17, 1985

- "Passionate and responsive dancing with an emotional clarity and a fine edge, he was incredibly alive, even subtle. Completely there."

–Burt Supree, Village Voice, June 25, 1985

- "He has an old-time regard for pure technique that has, among so many of his more fashionable contemporaries, gone out of style".

– Clive Barnes, New York Post, April 21, 1987
