= Alvalade =

Quarter and civil parish of the Portuguese capital

- Civil parish and quarter
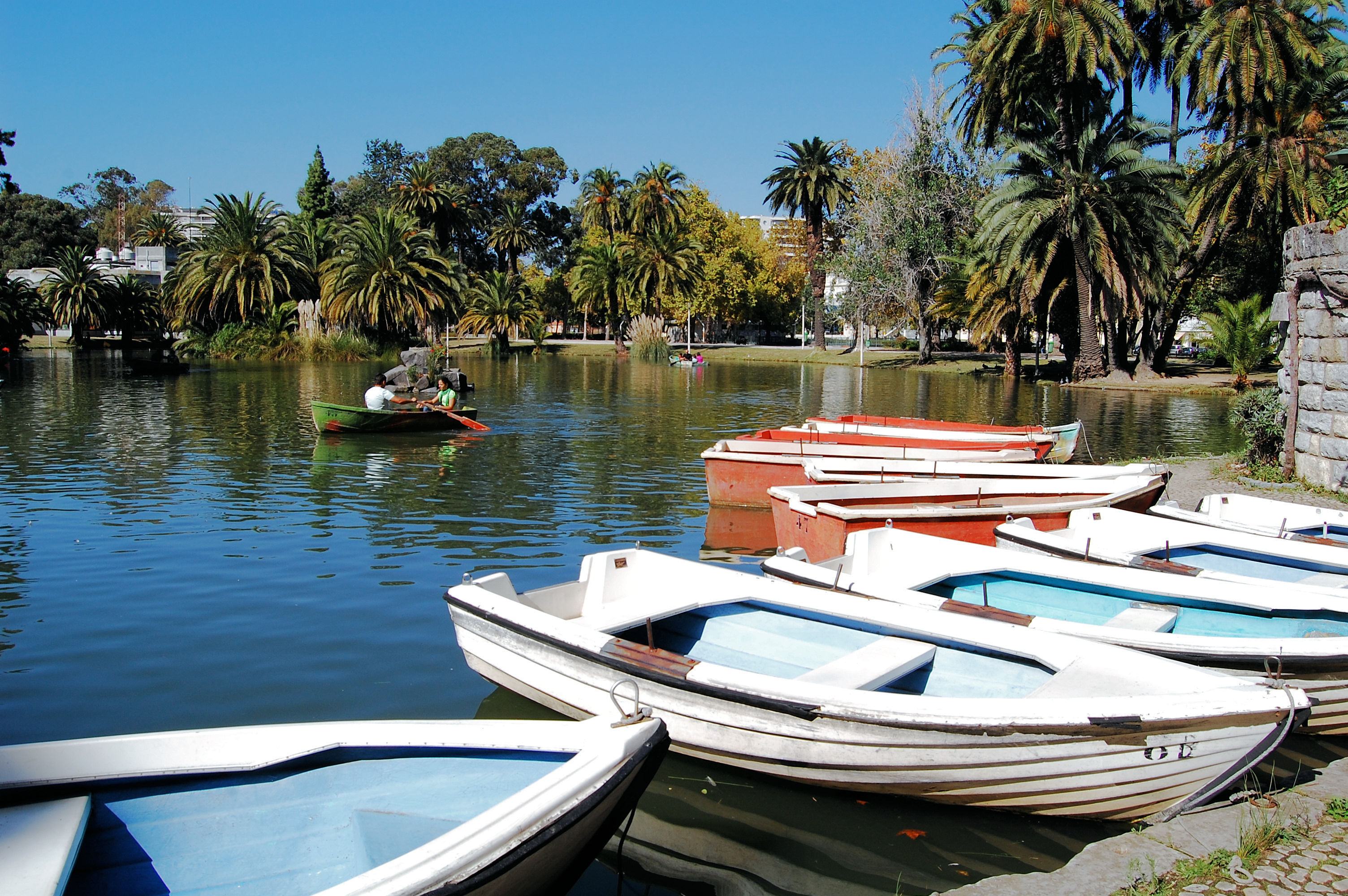
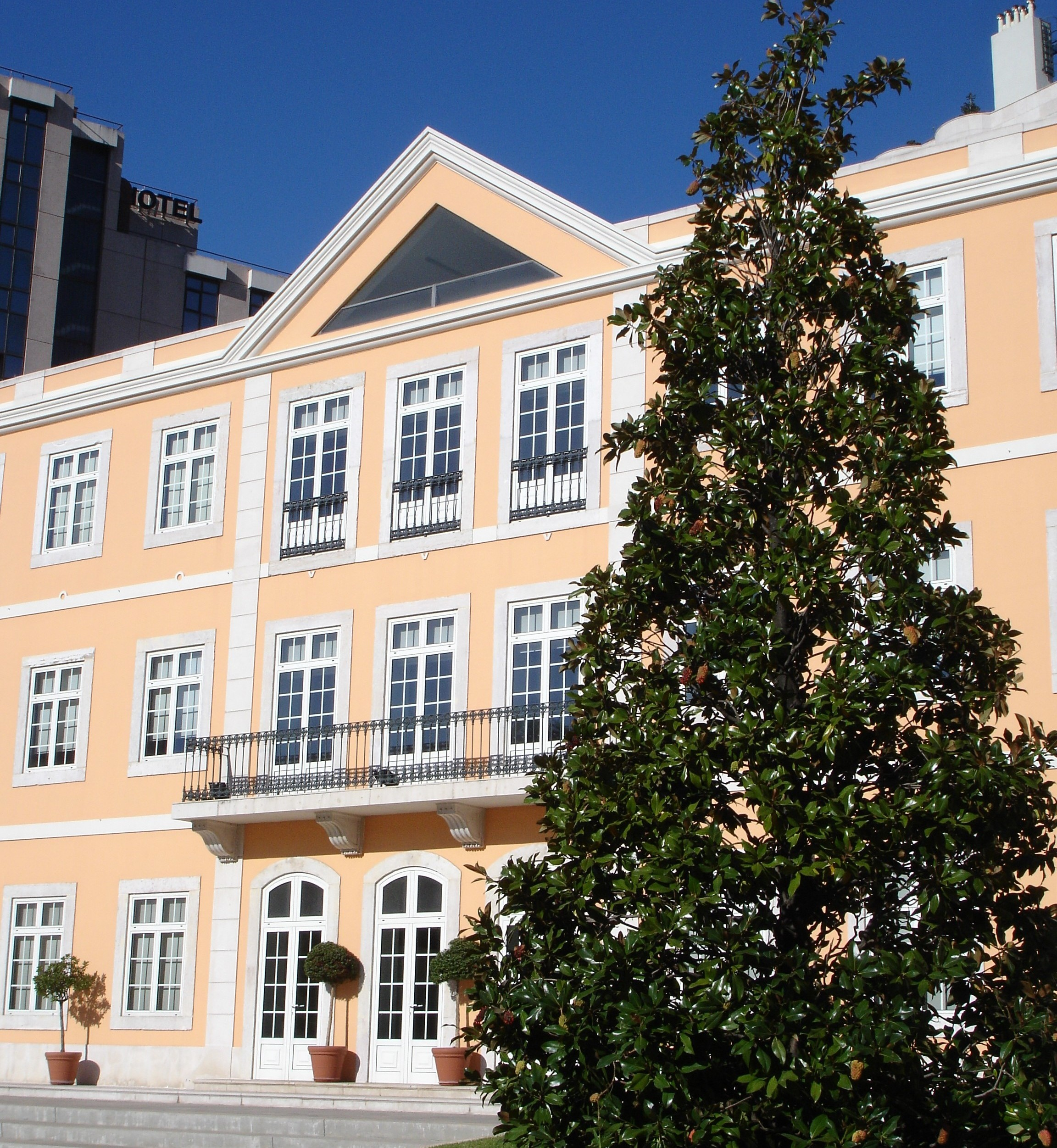
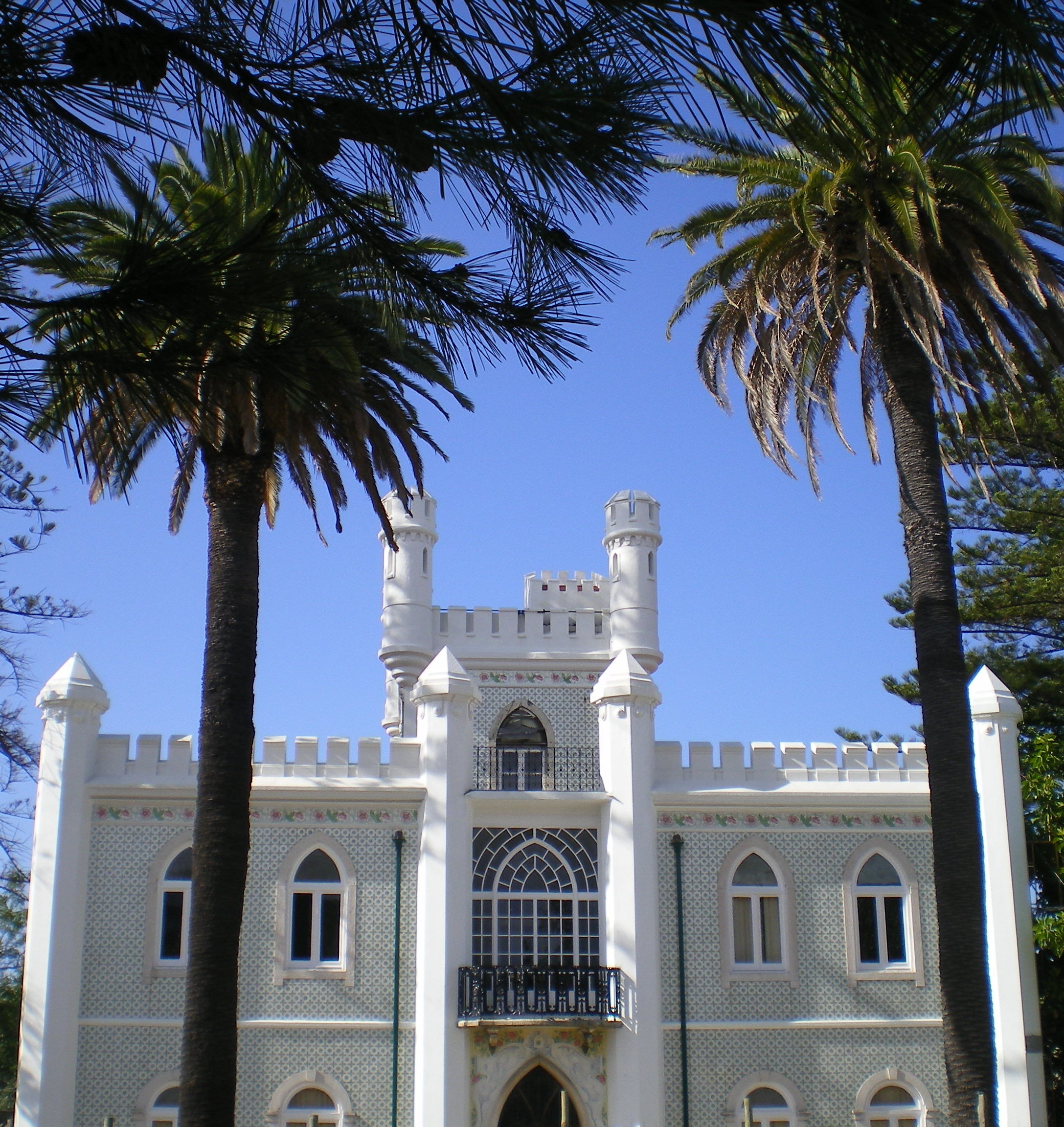
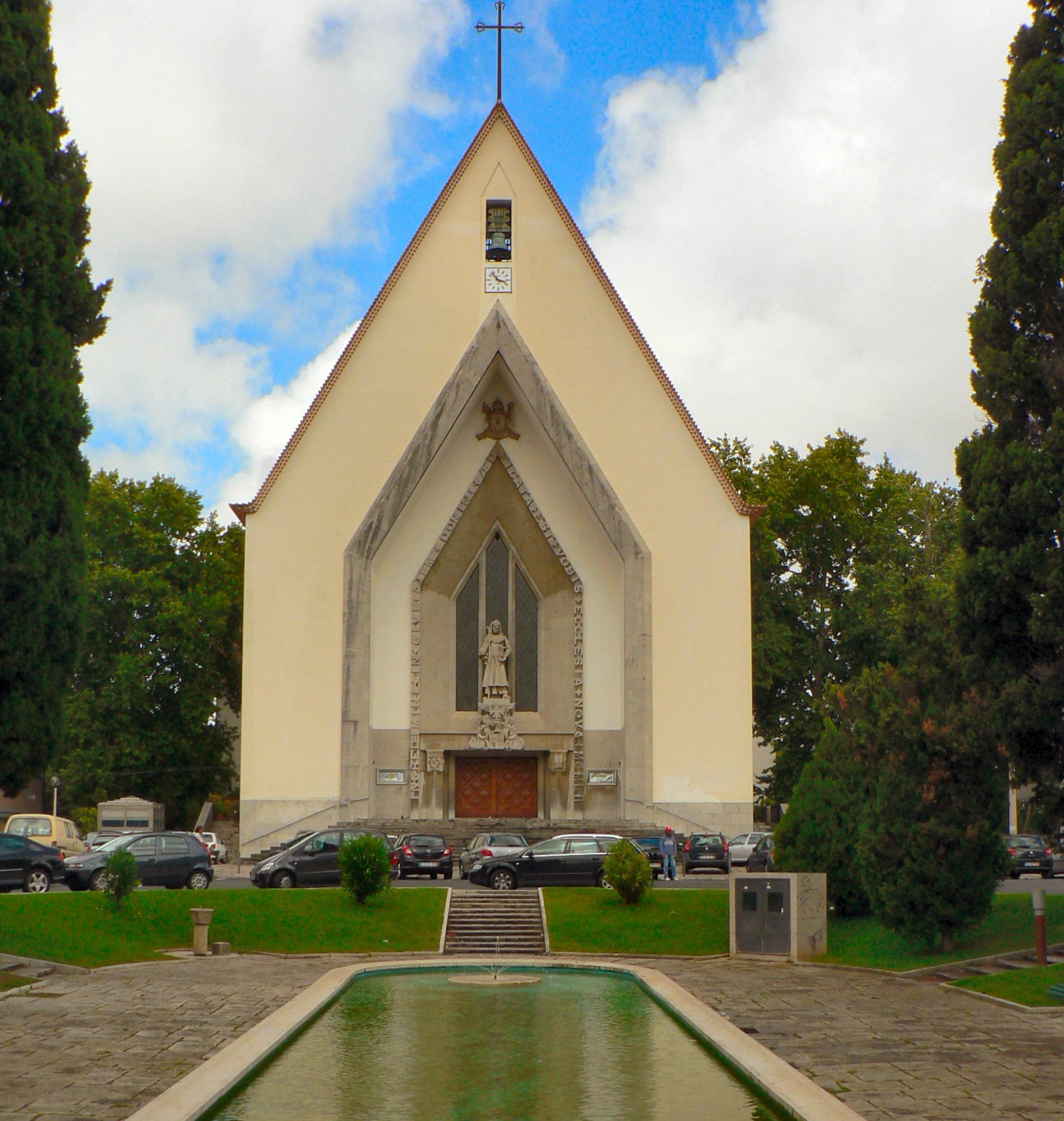
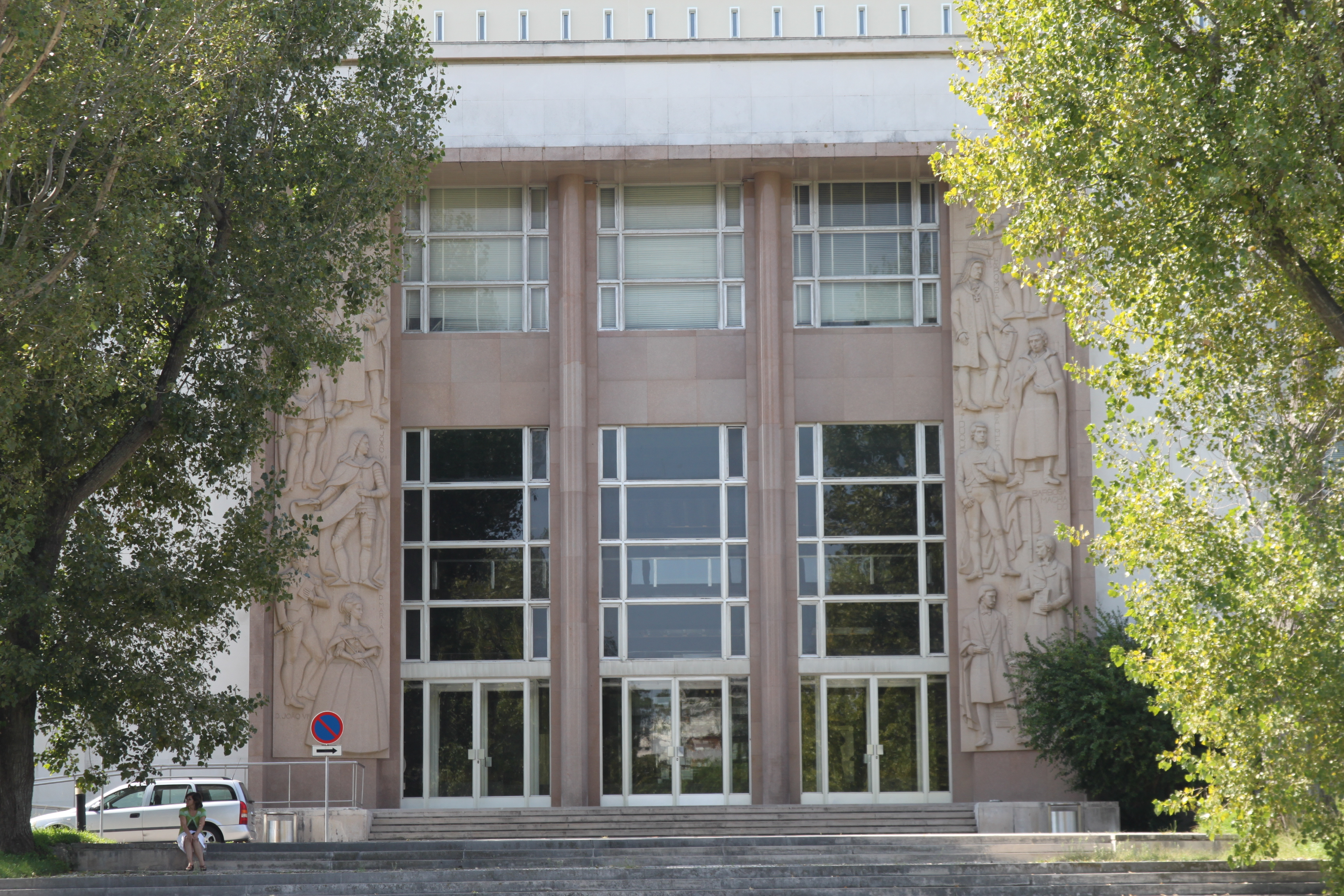
- Clockwise: Jardim Mário Soares; Igreja de São João de Brito;Quinta da Torrinha; Biblioteca Nacional de Portugal; Museum of Lisbon (Pimenta Palace campus); Fundação Cidade de Lisboa

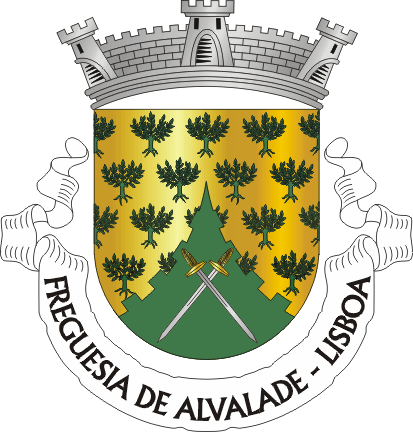
- Former coat of arms

- Alvalade within Lisbon
- Interactive map of Alvalade
- Coordinates: 38.747°N 9.136°W
- Country: Portugal
- Metro area: Lisbon
- Region: Greater Lisbon
- District: Lisbon
- Municipality: Lisbon
- Territorial Unit: Centre
- Establishment: 11 September 1852
- Current borders: 8 November 2012
- Seat: Largo Machado de Assis; 1700-116 Lisboa

Government
  - Type: Civil parish
  - Body: Junta (executive) and Assembly (deliberative)
  - President (2025-2029): Tomás Gonçalves (Por Ti, Lisboa - Alvalade (PSD/CDS-PP/IL)
  - President of the Assembly: José Luís Moreira da Silva (PSD)

Area
  - Total: 5.34 km^{2} (2.06 sq mi)

Population (2021)
  - Total: 33,309
  - Density: 6,240/km^{2} (16,200/sq mi)
- Demonym: alvaladense
- Time zone: UTC+00:00 (WET)
  - Summer (DST): UTC+01:00 (WEST)
- Postal codes: 1600, 1700
- Area code: 21
- Patron saints: Saint John de Britto, The Holy Princess Joan, The Three Magi Kings
- Website: https://jf-alvalade.pt/

Alvalade (Portuguese: [alvɐˈlaðɨ]) is a freguesia (civil parish) and typical quarter of Lisbon, the capital city of Portugal. Located in central Lisbon, Alvalade is south of Lumiar and Olivais, west of Marvila, east of São Domingos de Benfica, and north of Avenidas Novas and Areeiro. The population in 2021 was 33,309.

== History ==
The designation of Alvalade appears to have its origins in the Arabic name Al Balade, meaning "inhabited and walled place."

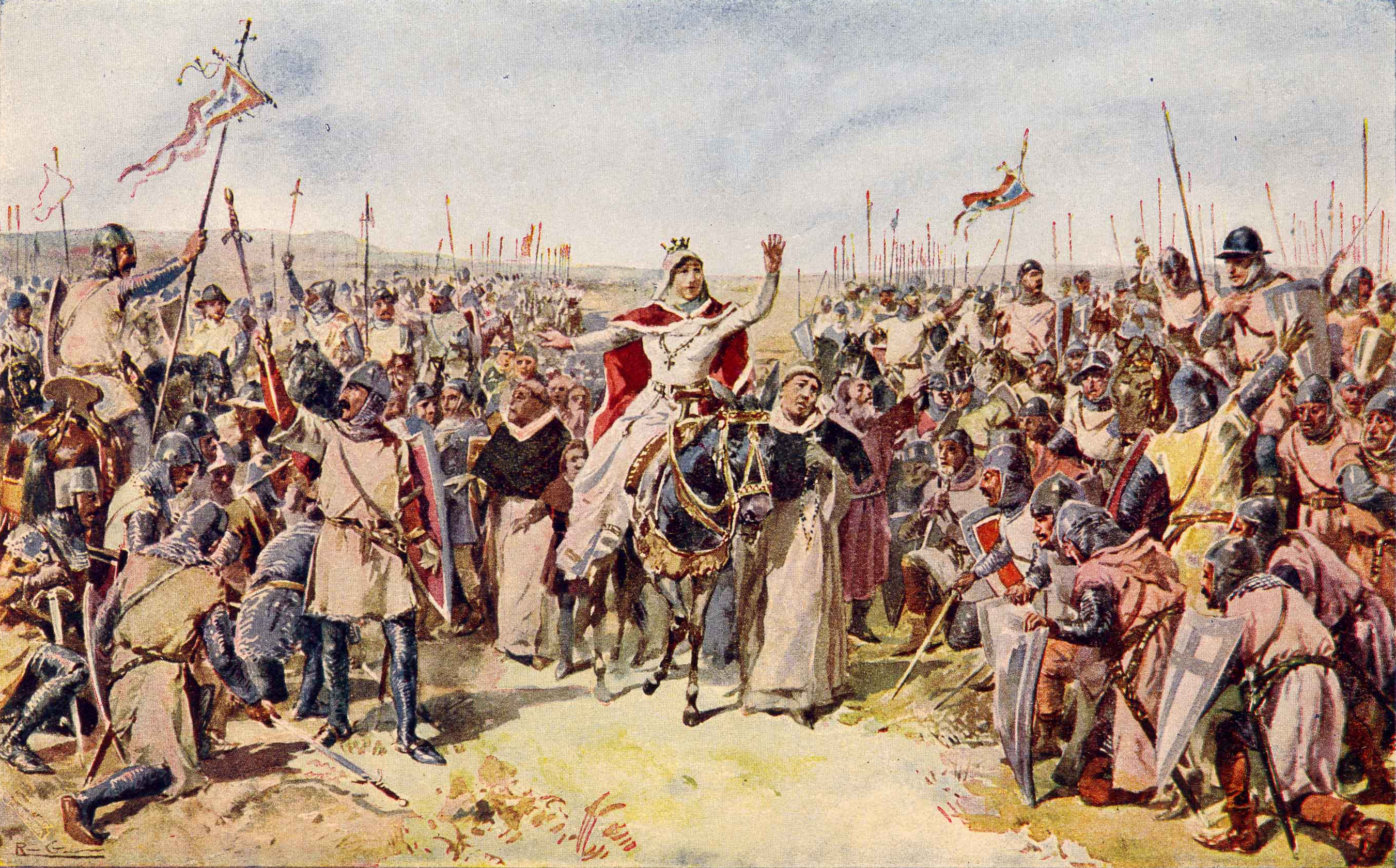
Battle of Alvalade in 1323.

In 1323, the Battle of Alvalade was fought between King Dinis I of Portugal and his son King Afonso IV of Portugal, but famously the battle was stopped after the intervention of Saint Queen Isabel of Portugal, wife of Dinis I and mother of Afonso IV. There is a monument erected in memory of the Saint Queen in Alvalade.

The neighborhood is based on the "Urbanization Plan of the Southern Zone of Avenida Alferes Malheiro," currently referred to as Avenida do Brasil, authored by architect Faria da Costa. The plan proposed an urban design centered around closed-block typologies, bounded by continuous streets, within a relatively non-hierarchical system. It also envisioned two major avenues originating from a single point, the intersection of Avenida de Roma with the railway, extending from Avenida de Roma to Avenida Alferes Malheiro (now Avenida do Brasil) near the Júlio de Matos Hospital. This plan emerged due to the city's housing shortage resulting from population growth, particularly in economically affordable housing.

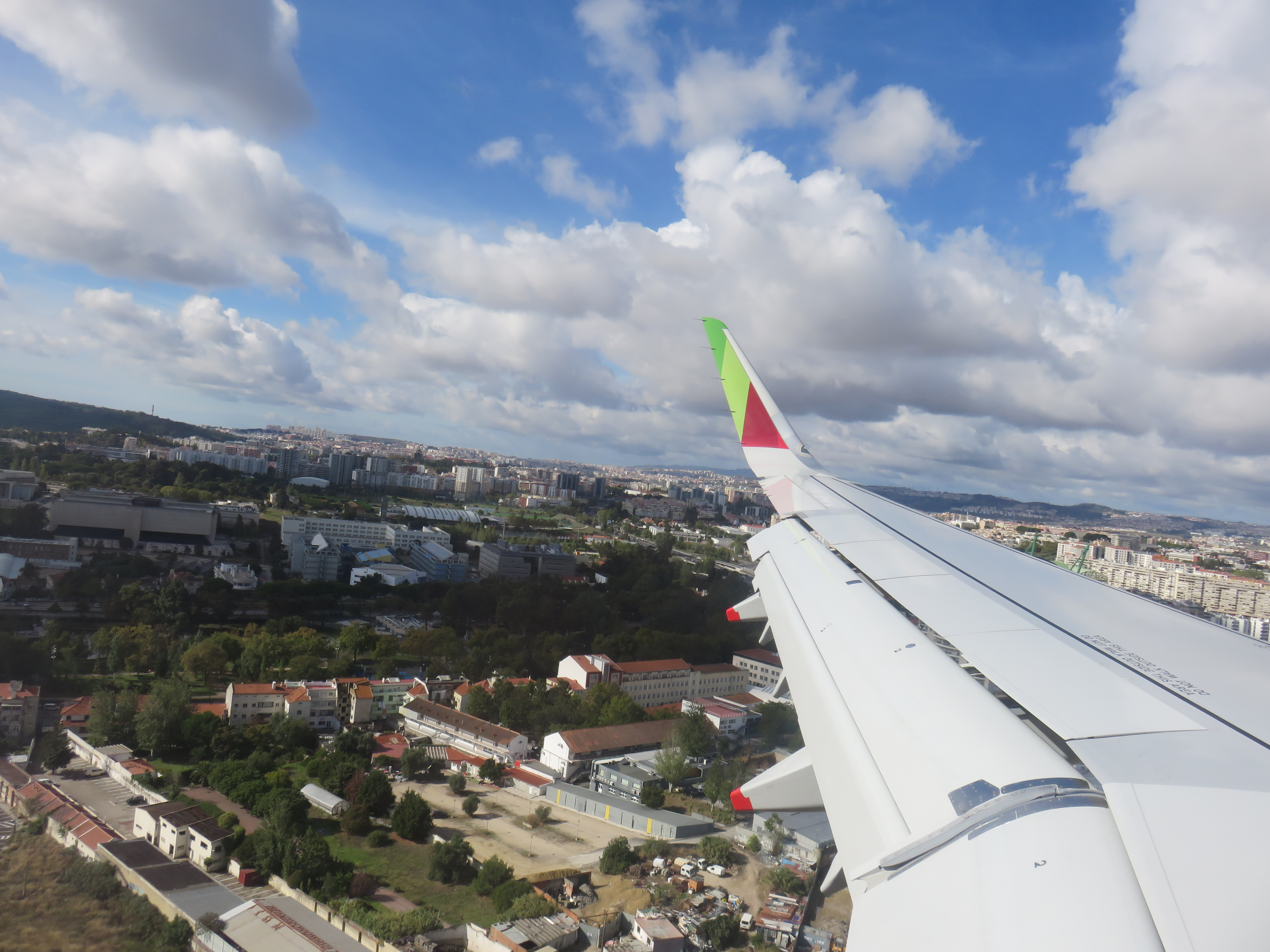
Alvalade aerial view in 2018

The implementation of this plan involved several architects, each responsible for a segment, resulting in a diverse range of architectural styles. Embracing this variety turned Alvalade into an experimental site for architecture, showcasing diverse housing proposals while maintaining harmonious control over the overall ensemble. This method, wherein an urban plan evolves during implementation, remains underexplored today. Minor adjustments were made to the overall plan during the detailed planning phase, but the main ideas remained intact.

In 1944, the introduction of the "neighborhood unit" determined the structure present in Alvalade today. Eight cells were established, spanning three different parishes in Lisbon: Campo Grande (cells 1 and 2), São João de Brito (cells 3, 4, 5, and 6), and Alvalade (cells 7 and 8). The boundaries encompass significant city thoroughfares: Avenida do Brasil (north), Avenida Gago Coutinho (east), the railway line (south), Rua de Entre-campos, and Campo Grande (west).

There are eight standard projects in this neighborhood, designated from A to H. Type A features ground-level open space supported by pilotis, while type B designates ground-level space for commercial use, primarily in the central zone. Types E, F, and G are considered variants for corner situations. Lastly, type H refers to small commercial constructions within the courtyards. In 1951, the Lot Division Plan began, with construction starting in 1952.

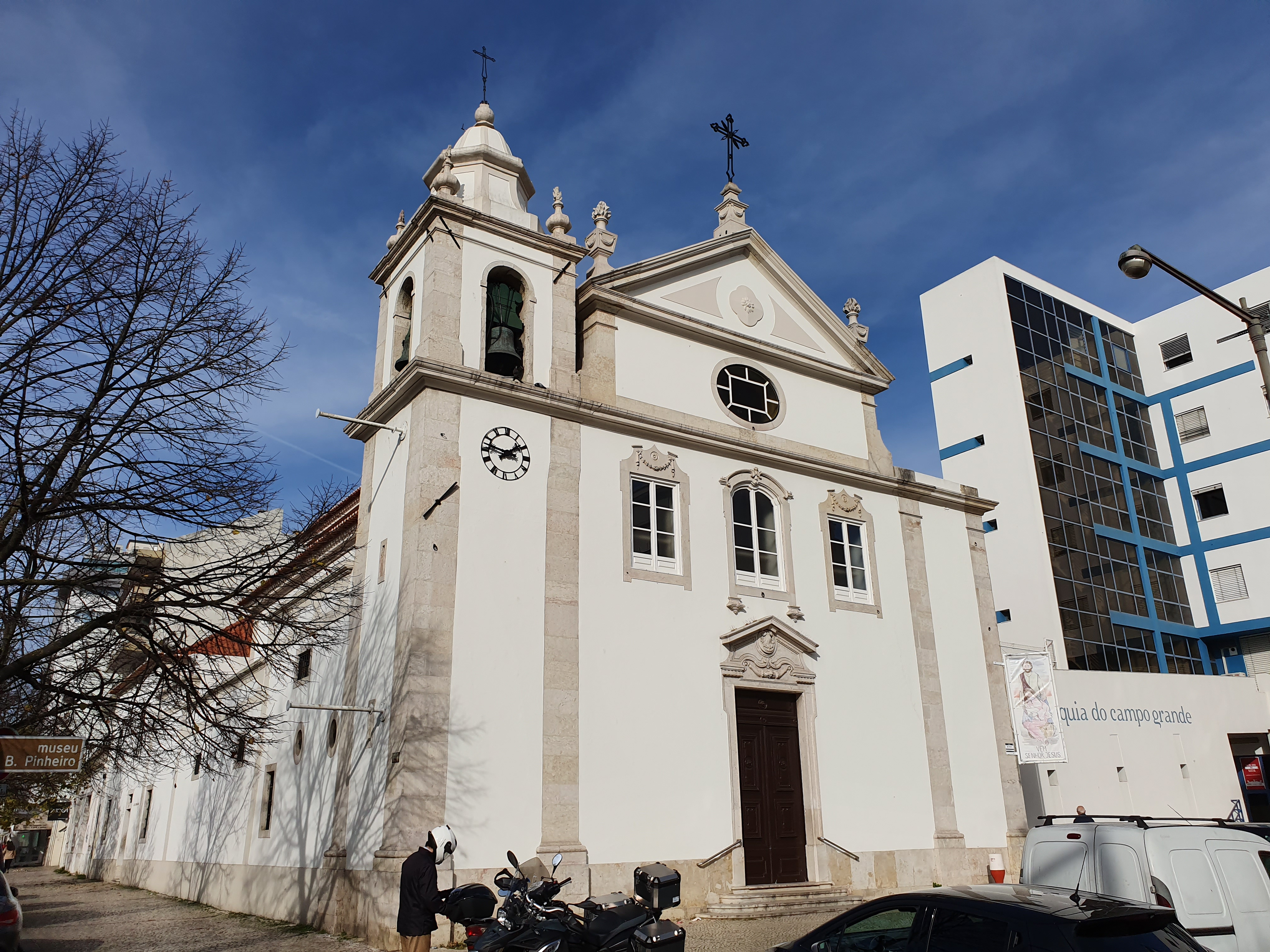
Igreja Paroquial do Campo Grande

This area was characterized by rural occupation on Lisbon's periphery, dominated by cultivation areas, estates, and small clusters of houses connected by minor roads. Urbanization transformed these clusters, incorporating existing elements into the new urban fabric. They were categorized into three levels of incorporated pre-existing structures: first, the main roads into Lisbon, second, the small clusters near these roads, and finally, isolated structures with significant architectural value. This culturalist approach integrated existing elements from the past, even those lacking significant architectural character, recognizing their importance to the new construction.

It was one of the 12 parishes created by the administrative reorganization of the municipality of Lisbon on February 7, 1959, which separated these territories from the former parish of Campo Grande. In the same year the parish of São João de Brito, named after the church dedicated to the Jesuit martyr of the same name, was created; it would have later been absorbed into Alvalade after 53 years.

By the 1960s, the final developments in the Alvalade neighborhood focused on detailed studies, aiming to accentuate organic construction and move away from more rationalist options. An example is the Lagares d'El Rei Urbanization in cell 8.

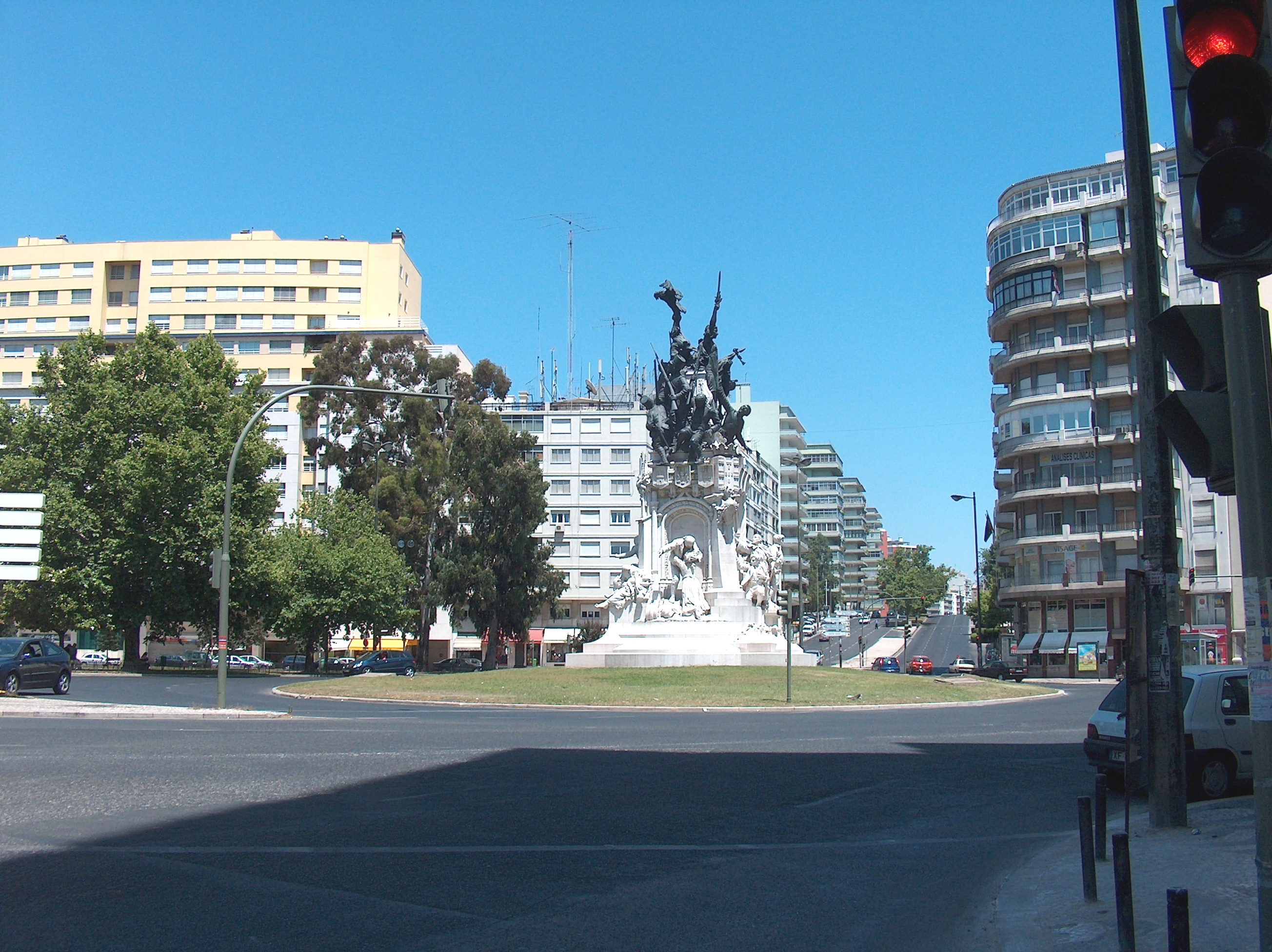
Entrecampos square

As a consequence of the administrative reorganization of 2012, which came into effect after the local elections of 2013, the parish brought together the former parishes of Alvalade, Campo Grande, and São João de Brito, as well as small territories that previously belonged to the parishes of Marvila, São Domingos de Benfica, and São João de Deus (the latter dissolved). These territories merged with the Alvalade parish and the new and larger one kept the latter's name.

The homonymous parish of Alvalade is dedicated to Saint Joana Princess, but following the expansion of 2012, the parish also includes within its territory the parishes of São João de Brito (patron saint of the former parish of the same name) and Santos Reis (patron saint of Campo Grande).

== Climate ==
Climate data for Alvalade (1991–2020)
Month	Jan	Feb	Mar	Apr	May	Jun	Jul	Aug	Sep	Oct	Nov	Dec	Year
Record high °C (°F)	22.9 (73.2)	25.5 (77.9)	30.5 (86.9)	33.8 (92.8)	38.1 (100.6)	43.4 (110.1)	45.1 (113.2)	46.1 (115.0)	43.6 (110.5)	36.6 (97.9)	28.8 (83.8)	24.6 (76.3)	46.1 (115.0)
Mean daily maximum °C (°F)	15.8 (60.4)	17.2 (63.0)	20.1 (68.2)	21.9 (71.4)	25.6 (78.1)	29.6 (85.3)	32.3 (90.1)	32.9 (91.2)	30.1 (86.2)	25.4 (77.7)	19.6 (67.3)	16.5 (61.7)	23.9 (75.0)
Daily mean °C (°F)	9.7 (49.5)	10.6 (51.1)	13.1 (55.6)	15.0 (59.0)	18.2 (64.8)	21.4 (70.5)	23.4 (74.1)	23.8 (74.8)	21.5 (70.7)	18.1 (64.6)	13.4 (56.1)	10.7 (51.3)	16.6 (61.9)
Mean daily minimum °C (°F)	3.5 (38.3)	4.0 (39.2)	6.1 (43.0)	8.0 (46.4)	10.7 (51.3)	13.2 (55.8)	14.4 (57.9)	14.6 (58.3)	13.0 (55.4)	10.9 (51.6)	7.2 (45.0)	4.9 (40.8)	9.2 (48.6)
Record low °C (°F)	−8.4 (16.9)	−7.2 (19.0)	−4.4 (24.1)	0.0 (32.0)	2.5 (36.5)	6.7 (44.1)	8.7 (47.7)	7.9 (46.2)	4.7 (40.5)	1.6 (34.9)	−2.9 (26.8)	−5.5 (22.1)	−8.4 (16.9)
Average precipitation mm (inches)	63.0 (2.48)	48.5 (1.91)	52.5 (2.07)	53.7 (2.11)	33.3 (1.31)	7.8 (0.31)	0.8 (0.03)	2.3 (0.09)	23.0 (0.91)	67.8 (2.67)	74.6 (2.94)	83.1 (3.27)	510.4 (20.09)
Average precipitation days (≥ 1 mm)	7.9	7.0	7.0	7.2	5.1	1.2	0.3	0.5	2.9	7.1	8.0	8.9	63.2
Source: Instituto Português do Mar e da Atmosfera

== Demographics ==
Alvalade area before and after the 2012 Portuguese administrative reform

=== Historical resident population (before the 2012 Administrative Reform) ===
The resident population recorded according to censuses carried over the years is shown in the following tables for the three parishes that today constitute Alvalade. It is noteworthy that the ancient parish of Alvalade lost 7,750 people from 1960 to 2011 or 46.63% of its 1960 population, not having recorded a single population gain since 1960. Similarly, the ancient parish of Campo Grande lost 8,386 people or 44.37% of its population from 1960 to 2011, with major population losses recorded in the sixties (-22.3%). The former parish of São João de Brito, the last one to be urbanised, still experienced demographic growth in the sixties but managed to lose 11,579 people or 49.68% of its population from 1970 to 2011.

Alvalade (ancient)

Historical population
Year	Pop.	±%
1960	16,619	—
1970	15,977	−3.9%
1981	15,078	−5.6%
1991	10,996	−27.1%
2001	9,620	−12.5%
2011	8,869	−7.8%
Source: INE

Campo Grande

Historical population
Year	Pop.	±%
1960	18,900	—
1970	15,032	−20.5%
1981	14,653	−2.5%
1991	12,146	−17.1%
2001	11,148	−8.2%
2011	10,514	−5.7%
Source: INE

São João de Brito

Historical population
Year	Pop.	±%
1960	20,073	—
1970	23,306	+16.1%
1981	20,728	−11.1%
1991	17,143	−17.3%
2001	13,449	−21.5%
2011	11,727	−12.8%
Source: INE

=== Current resident population (before the 2012 Administrative Reform) ===
In the 2021 Portuguese census was recorded the first demographic growth of the parish since 1960. In particular, from 2011 to 2021 the parish gained 2,199 people, recording a growth of +7.07%.

Former Parishes			Current Parish			
Parish	Population (2011)	Area (km^{2})	Parish	Population in 2011	Population in 2021	Area (km^{2})
Alvalade (ancient)	8,869	0.66	Alvalade	31,110	33,309	5.34
Campo Grande	10,514	2.45	Alvalade	31,110	33,309	5.34
São João de Brito	11,727	2.23	Alvalade	31,110	33,309	5.34

=== Demographic statistics ===
- Age

The last censuses show that the parish's population is ageing at a fast pace: in 2021 23.92% of the population was below 25 and, at the same time, almost a quarter (24.73%) of the residents was 65 or older.

Distribution of Population by Age Groups
Year	0-14 Years	0-14 Years %	15-24 Years	15-24 Years %	25-64 Years	25-64 Years %	> 65 Years	> 65 Years %
2021	4,639	13.93%	3,329	9.99%	17,104	51.35%	8,237	24.73%

- Religion
Religion in Alvalade (Census 2021)
1. Catholicism (67.0%)
2. Protestantism (1.47%)
3. Jehovah's Witnesses and Other Christian (1.52%)
4. Orthodoxy (0.43%)
5. Islam (0.61%)
6. Hinduism (0.39%)
7. Buddhism (0.28%)
8. Judaism (0.11%)
9. Other religions (0.25%)
10. No religion (27.9%)

The parish is predominantly catholic and 70.44% of the population aged 15 or above are followers of a Christian or Jeovah's Witness denomination as of 2021.

Interestingly, around 27.93% of the population doesn't practice a religion and is thus non religious.

The presence of minor religions such as Islam, Hinduism and Buddhism (1.63% of the population amongst the three) is probably due to an increasing community of people coming from India, Pakistan, Bangladesh or Nepal.

- Immigration

In 2021, 5.38% of the population of the parish was constituted by foreigners. In particular, amongst women foreigners were 5.46% of the total. This means that in Alvalade there are 1,793 resident foreigners, a sharp increase from 2011, when there were 1,195 resident foreigners (3.76%). Since the foreign population increased by 598 people from 2011 to 2021 and given that the total population of the parish increased by 2,199 units in the same timespan, it is noteworthy that the total population growth was due for more a quarter to the increase in the number of resident foreigners, thus not counting people who have acquired Portuguese nationality in the meantime. The largest group of foreigners is constituted by the Brazilians (665 people or +61.02% since 2011), PALOP countries (235 people or +29.12% since 2011), Chinese (129 people or +95.45% since 2011), Spaniards (104 people or -20% since 2011), Italians (96 people or +231.03% since 2011) and people from the Indian Subcontinent, most notably Nepalis and Bangladeshis, totaling 88 people, or recording an increase of +109.52% since 2011.

Dealing with the foreign-born population, 11.81% of the parish's population was born abroad as of 2021. The most common countries of birth were PALOP countries (1,420 people), Brazil (1,063 people), France (149 people), Spain (137 people) and the Indian Subcontinent (123 people). Of the Portuguese nationals born abroad, the most common countries of birth were PALOP countries (1,211 people) and Brazil (399 people), all countries having ancient historical ties with Portugal as well as a rooted migration history towards the country, and who are, thus, more likely to have acquired Portuguese citizenship along the years.

Moreover, as of 2021 in the parish there were 2,960 people who have entered Portugal after 2010, constituting 8.89% of the population. Of those with recent migrant background, 26.49% were Portuguese nationals returning from a period of emigration abroad.

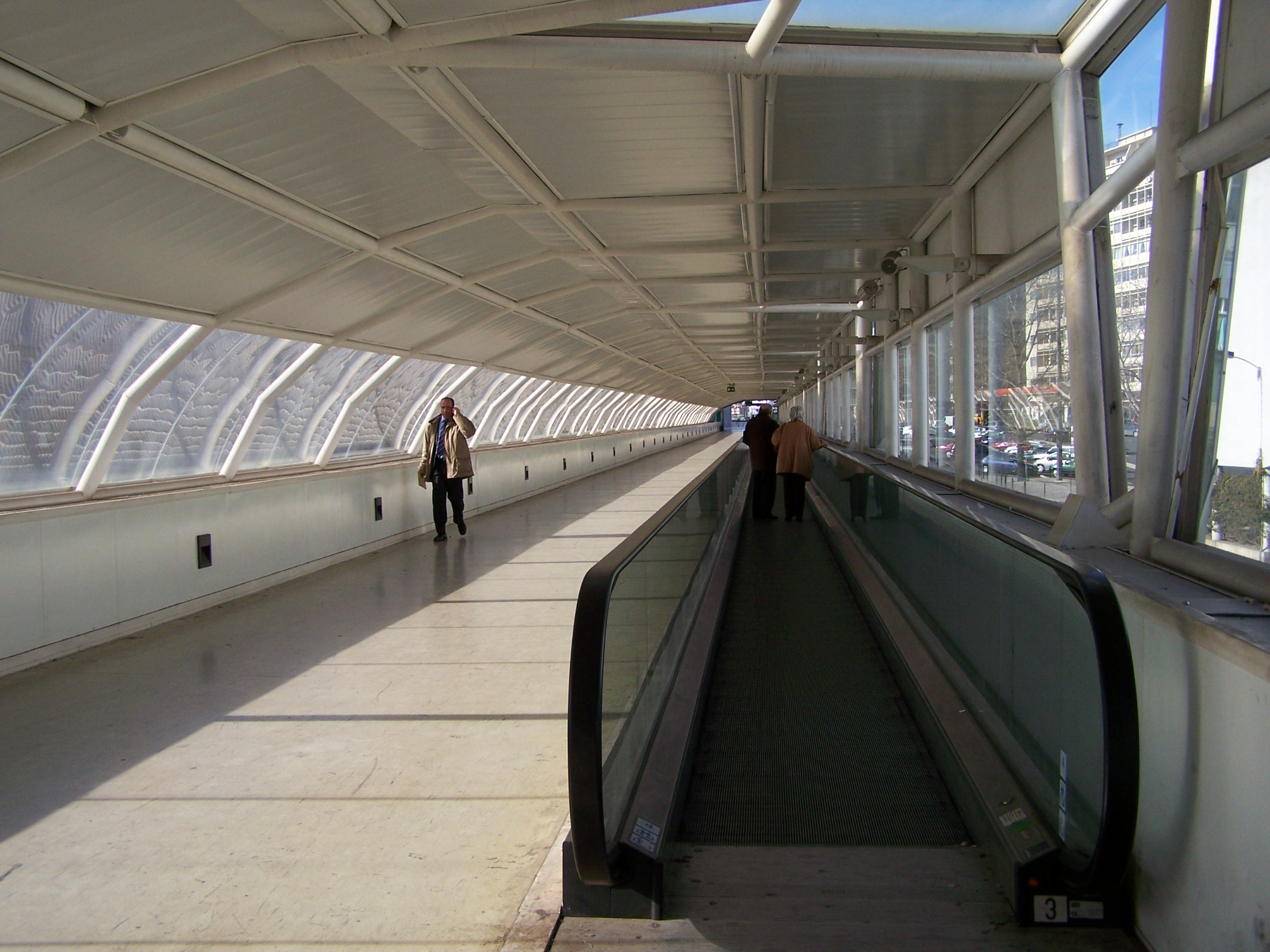
Elders walking in Roma station passageway. According to the 2021 census, immigrants are younger than local residents.

Amongst the Portuguese, 5,474 had already lived abroad as of 2021 (17.37% of the Portuguese population). The majority of those having lived in Angola and Mozambique (1,733 people) entered Portugal in the Seventies (1,058 people or 61.05%), following the independence of the two former colonies (so called retornados). Those coming from countries hosting large Portuguese emigrant communities such as France, Spain, Germany, Switzerland, Luxembourg or Belgium (1,114 people) have mostly entered Portugal after 1991 (72.71%), probably due to the development of the Portuguese economy since its accession to the EU. Interestingly, 35.32% of the Portuguese nationals having lived in the UK and residing in the parish, has left the UK after 2016, (date of the Brexit referendum).

If the whole population (regardless of the nationality held) is taken into account, then 21.35% of the parish's population has already lived abroad for at least one year as of 2021, with EU countries, PALOP countries, Brazil and the United Kingdom being the most commonly cited countries of previous residence.

== Education ==
In the parish of Alvalade are located some of the largest and most prestigious universities in the country, both public and private. Among the public institutions, notable ones include the Cidade universitária of the University of Lisbon, the largest university in the country, and the University Institute of Lisbon (ISCTE). Among the private universities, prominent ones are the Portuguese Catholic University and the Lusophone University of Humanities and Technologies (Universidade Lusófona).

The rectorate and several faculties of the University of Lisbon, those which belonged to the former Classical University of Lisbon, one of the predecessors of the current university (Law, Humanities, Psychology, Sciences, Medicine, Dental Medicine, and Pharmacy), are situated in the parish of Alvalade, within the so-called University City. Besides the faculties, other university facilities such as the Lisbon University Stadium (Estádio Universitário de Lisboa), some cafeterias, and residences are also located in the same parish.

== Economy and Social conditions ==
=== Employment ===
In the parish of Alvalade there are 961 residents who, as of 2021, were unemployed. Of these, 41.52% received a state-fund subsidy or pension (41.34% in Lisbon). In 2021 the unemployment rate in the parish is considerably lower than the one recorded for Lisbon and for Portugal as a whole, standing at 6.04%. In the same year, Portugal as a whole had an unemployment rate of 8.13% that has progressively decreased to 6.1% in 2023. As the statistics dealing with unemployment at the parish level are available only every 10 years, the current (2023) unemployment rate in Alvalade is unknown. Amongst youth aged 15–24 the unemployment rate in 2021 in the parish stood at 16.01%, 4.59% lower than in the rest of the country.

On the other hand, in 2021 14,959 residents were employed, of which 73.54% were employees and 23.47% were independent workers. Below is the table showing the employment rate per age group. The low share of people aged 20–24 employed is due to the fact that many are still in education (e.g. university) while the low proportion of those in employment aged 60–64 is due to many being early pensioners.

2021 census data	Age group								
2021 census data	20-24	25-29	30-34	35-39	40-44	45-49	50-54	55-59	60-64
Share of people in employment	31.65%	80.18%	85.14%	85.52%	86.28%	85.57%	81.25%	72.78%	56.95%

Dealing with commuting, the residents of Alvalade spent 19.87 minutes of daily commuting, 2 minutes less than the average inhabitant of Lisbon.

=== Social conditions ===
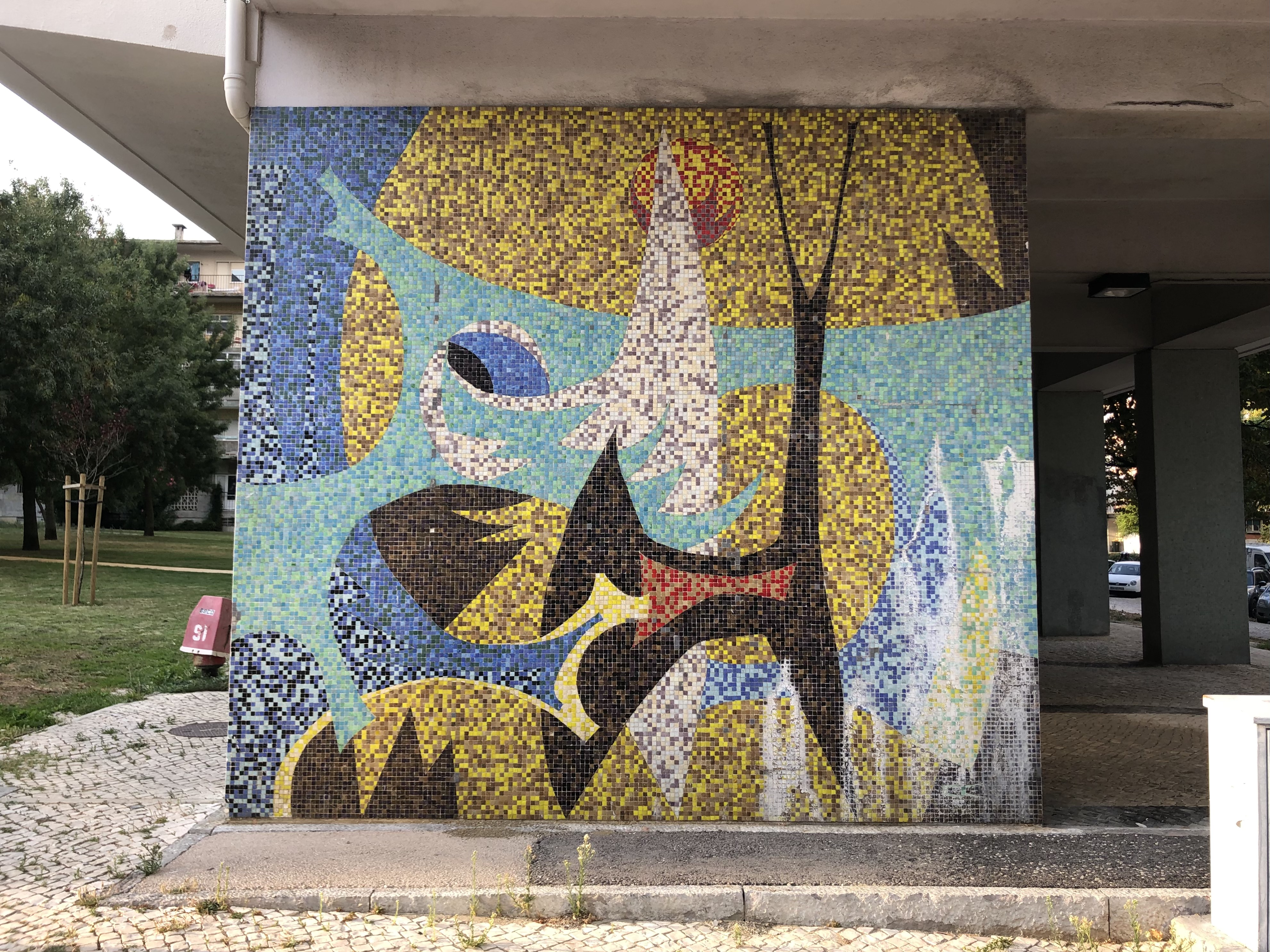
Mural in Avenida dos Estados Unidos da América

Dealing with overcrowding in the parish's households, 3.59% of the population lives in accommodations where they have less than 15 m^{2} per capita (8.71% for Lisbon and 5.65% in Portugal as a whole), while 47.05% live in houses with more than 40 m^{2} per capita (39.64% for Lisbon and 46.84% in Portugal as a whole). There are 3,543.8 dwellings per km^{2} (3,200.5 for Lisbon and 64.9 in Portugal as a whole).

51.7% of the population lives in owned dwellings as of 2021; this is higher than the value recorded for Lisbon (50.3%) but significantly lower than the one recorded for Portugal (70%). The average height of a residential building in Alvalade is 4.5 floors as of 2021 and the average area of a dwelling stands at 103.91 m^{2} (with the average in Lisbon-city 93.07 m^{2} being and in Portugal 112.45 m^{2}).

The average monthly rent value of leased dwellings recorded in 2021 stood at €627.21, 33.20% higher than the Lisbon average in the same year (€470.87). It is nonetheless important to notice that the value of the rents is quite low because of many contracts stipulated decades ago, with 13.00% (25.34% in Lisbon) of the dwellers paying less than €150/month because of the rent-freezing system that was adopted in Portugal in the late XX century, allowing that many people, now mostly elders, don't have to pay high rents. Due to the housing crisis and inflation, in 2023 the average rent for new contracts (frozen contracts aren't concerned) stood in fact at €13-€14/m^{2} in Alvalade, meaning that for the average 103.91 m^{2} dwelling are necessary around €1,403/month.

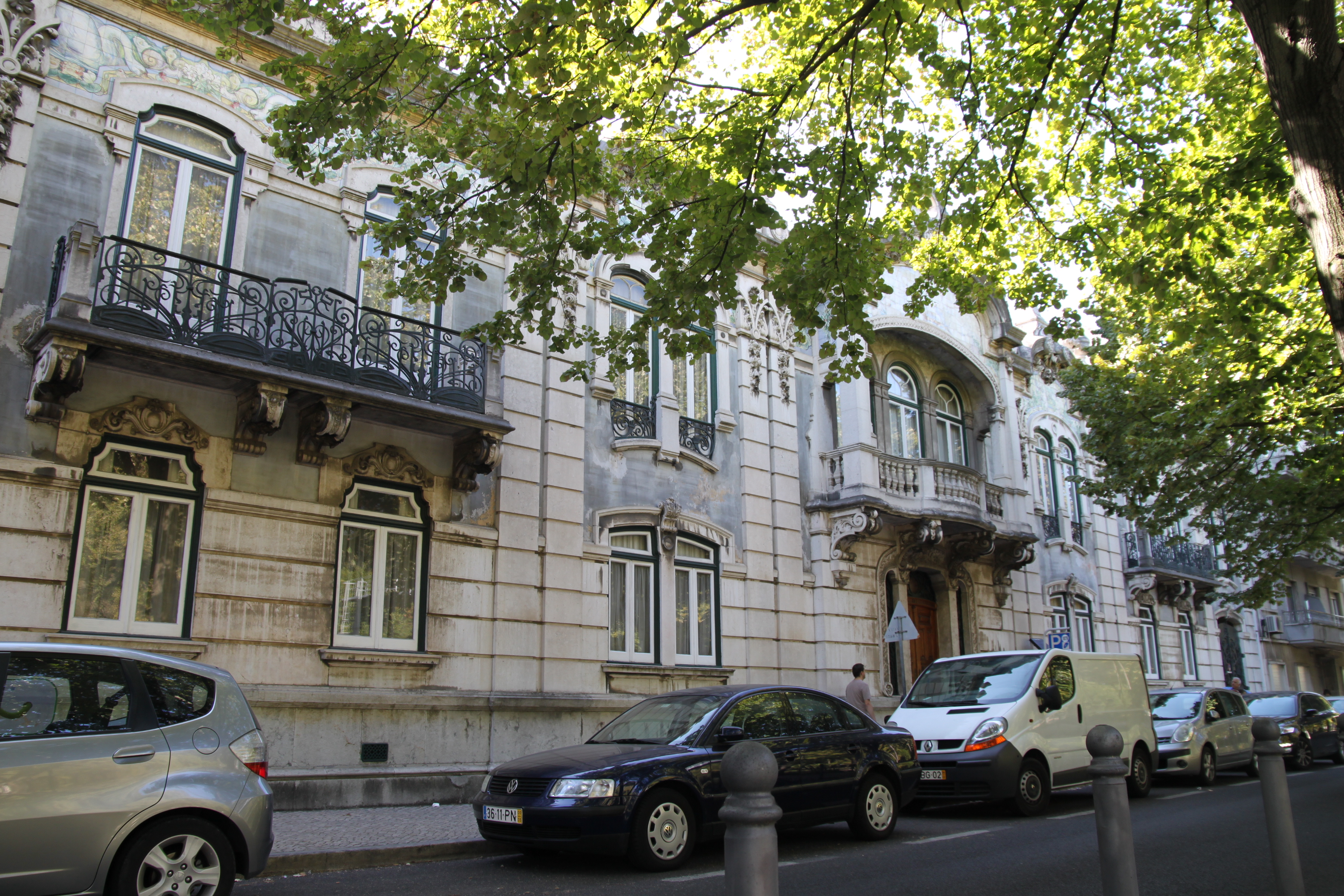
Residential building in Rua Ocidental ao Campo Grande

Dealing with housing prices, it is interesting to remark that if the median price per m^{2} stood at €1,979 for a house sold in early 2016, this value had risen to €3,415/m^{2} in early 2021 and to €4,479/m^{2} in 2023, experiencing a growth of +126.33% in just 7 years. In the same period the growth of house priced per m^{2} in Lisbon as a whole was +117.6%, from €1,875/m^{2} to €4,080/m^{2}.

Of the 2,489 residential buildings listed in the parish, 0.68% were built before 1919, 70.67% from 1919 to 1960, 21.45% from 1961 to 1990, 3.21% from 1991 to 2000 and 3.98% after 2001. Of the buildings built before 1919 100% had 1 to 3 floors, while in buildings built between 1981 and 2010 the proportion of buildings with 6 stories or more is 57.97%. Interestingly, the newer and higher the building the higher the probability of it being served by an elevator. For homes built before 1946, only 9.09% have access to an elevator as of 2021; this percentage ascends to 71.50% for buildings dating from 1981 to 2010. Always with regard to amenities, 28.12% of the houses had access to air conditioning (20.98% in Lisbon), 79.80% to heating (69.62% in Lisbon) and 23.09% to a parking place (28.04% in Lisbon).

As of 2021 there were 2,447 vacant dwelling in the parish. Of the vacant dwellings, 888 are vacant for rental or with the purpose of being sold, while 1,559 are vacant for other reasons, often abandoned, awaiting their demolition or because a reason for conflict among heirs. Moreover, as of 2023 205 apartments are registered as "Alojamento Local", meaning they have the license to be rent on platforms such as Booking.com or Airbnb.

In the parish were also recorded 9 homeless people, of which 8 (88.89%) were males. The parish is thus actively promoting initiatives aiming at helping people in situation of permanent of temporal homelessness.

== Landmarks ==
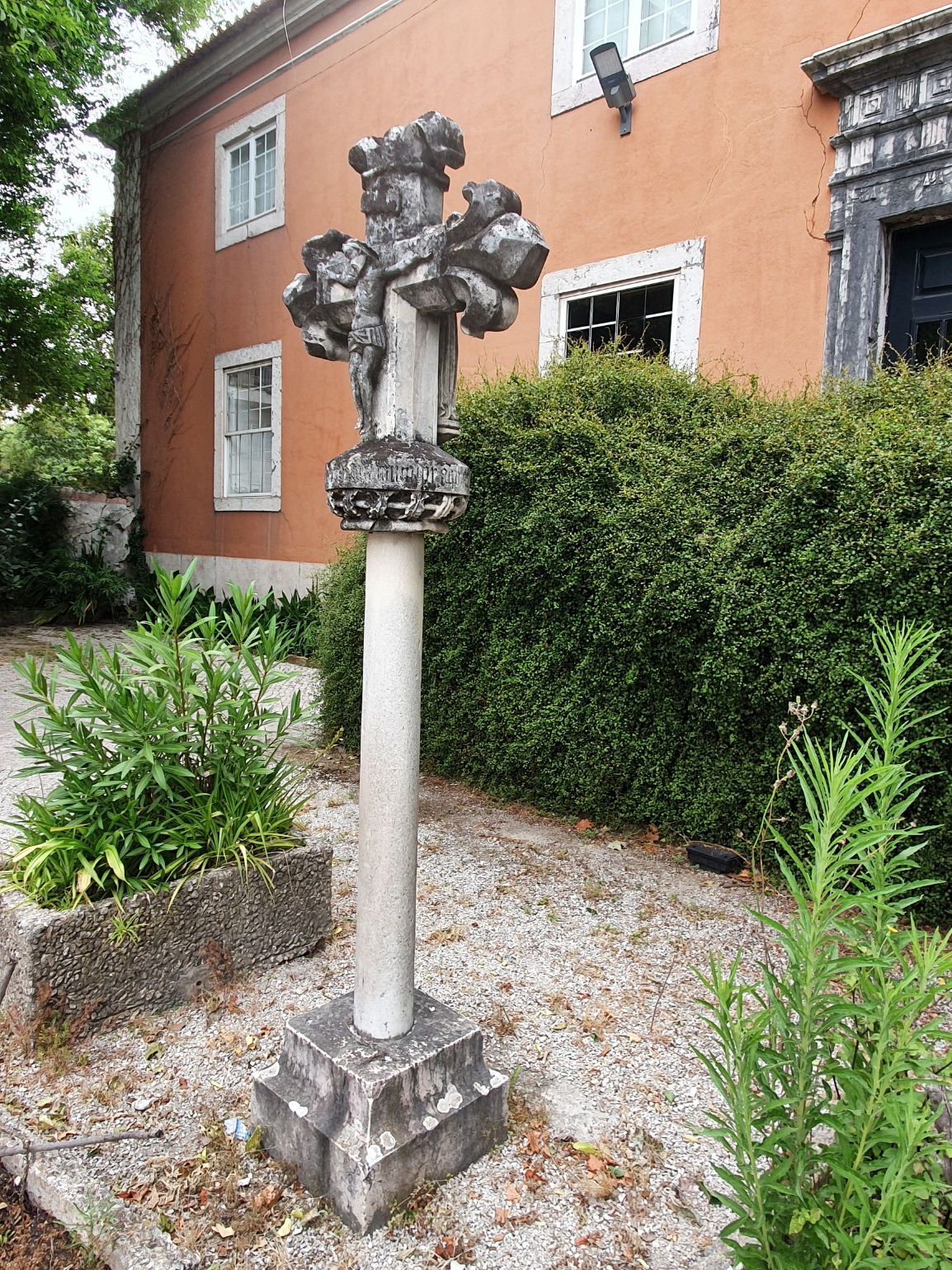
Cruzeiro das Laranjeiras (Campo Grande)

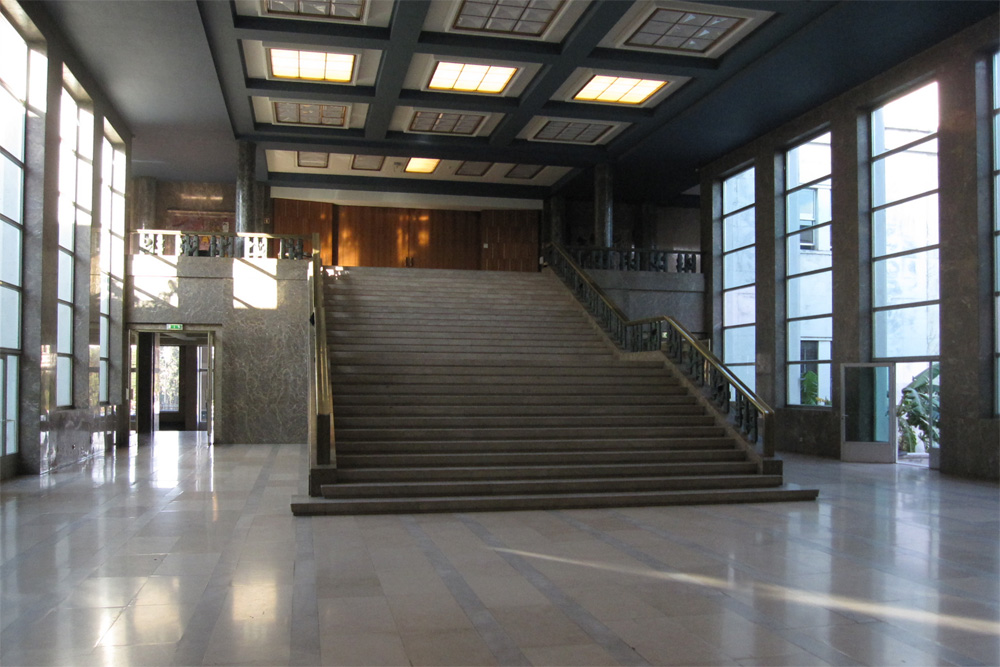
Rectory of the University of Lisbon

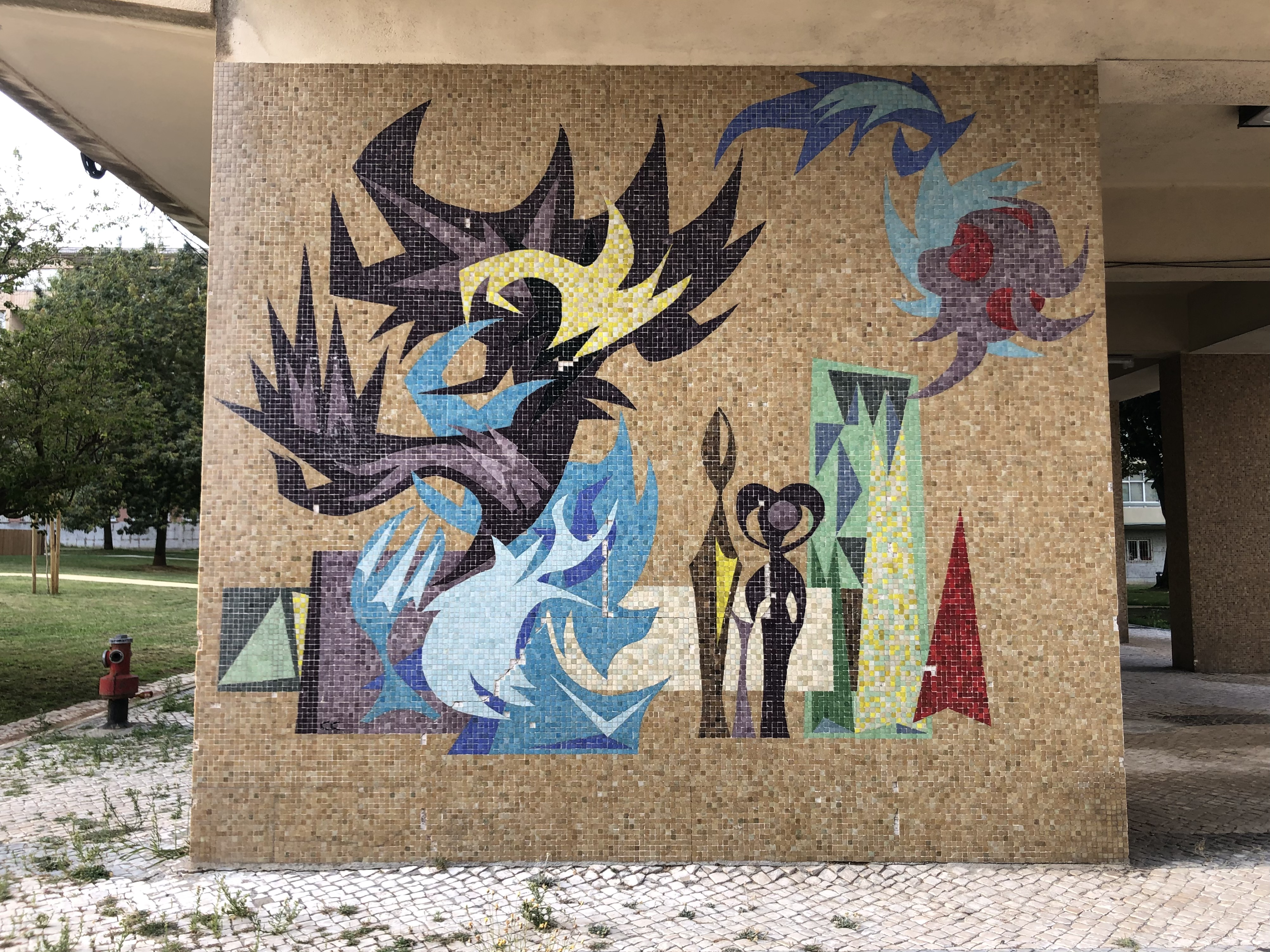
Mural in Avenida dos Estados Unidos da América

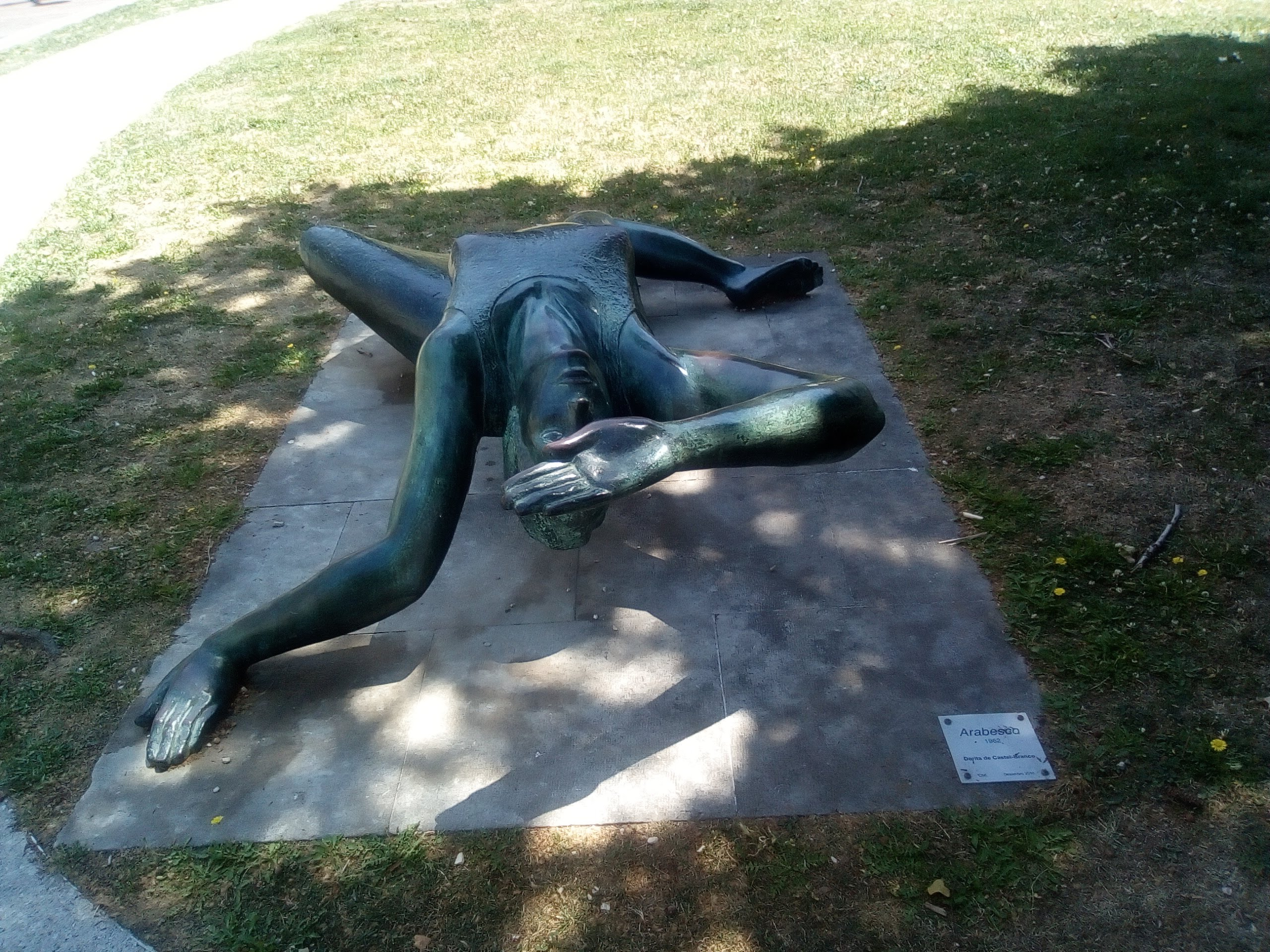
Arabesco statue

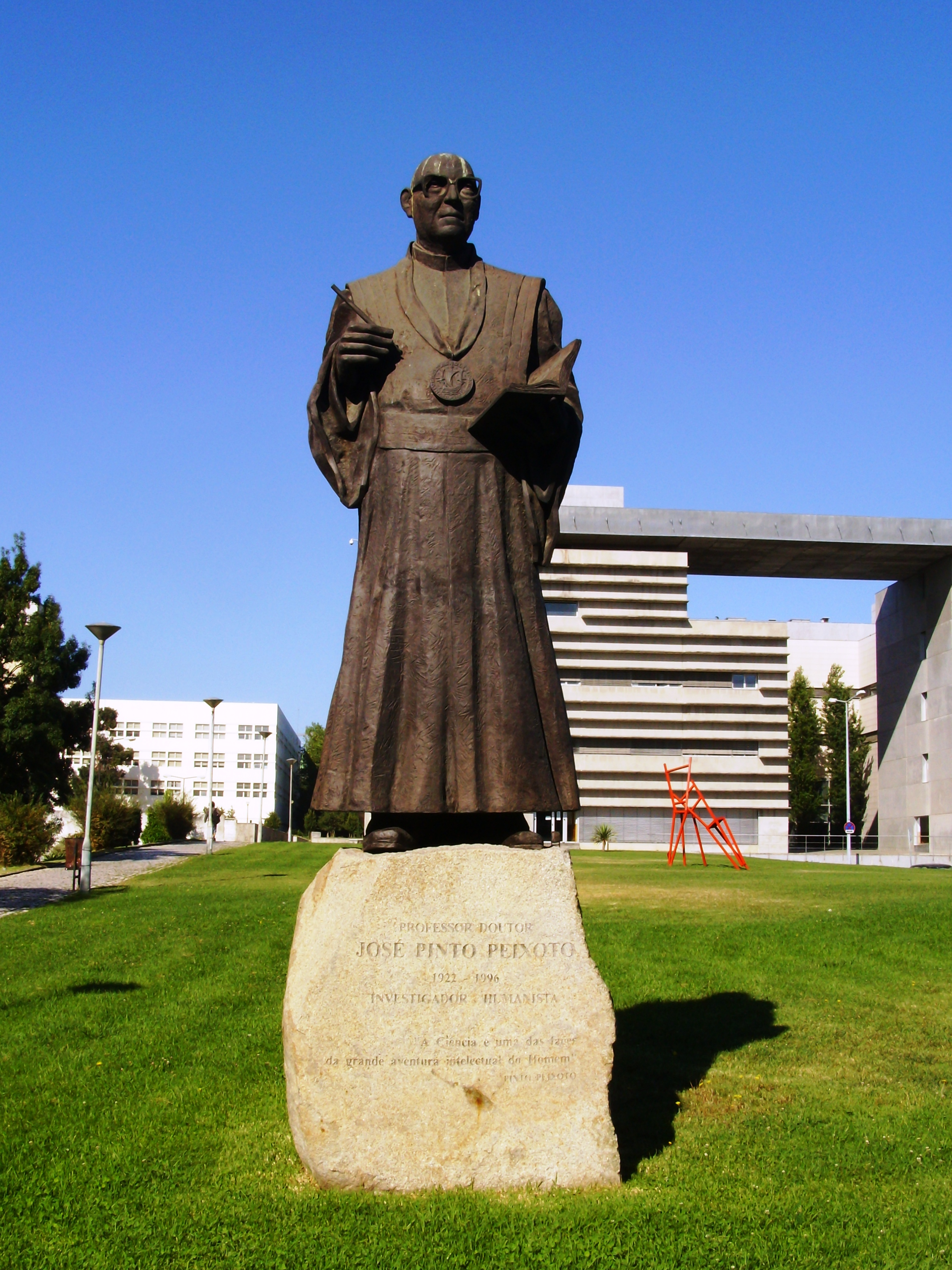
José Pinto Peixoto statue

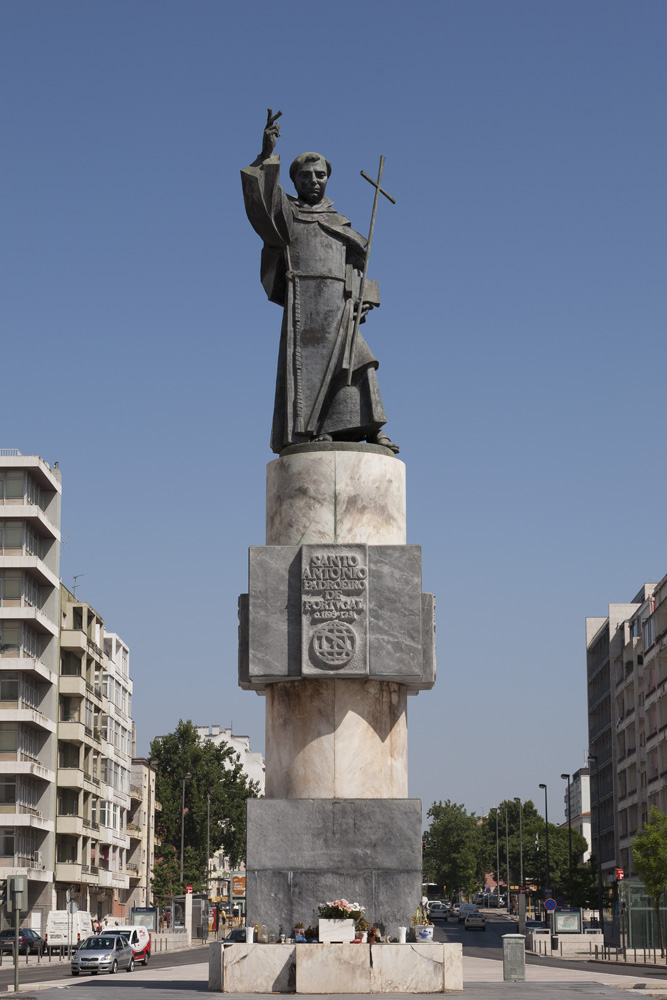
Saint Anthony statue, a central landmark of Alvalade.

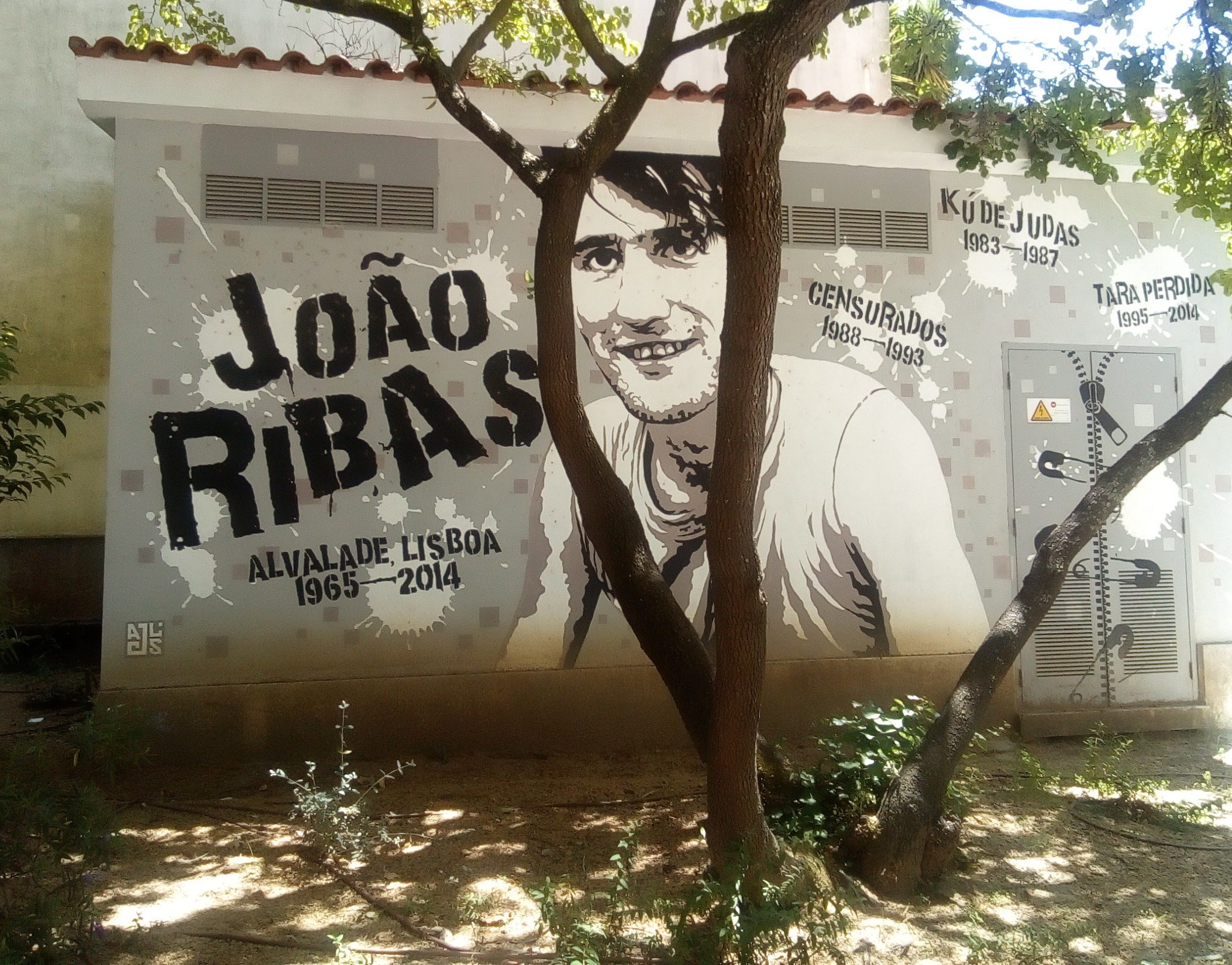
João Ribas mural in Jardim dos Coruchéus

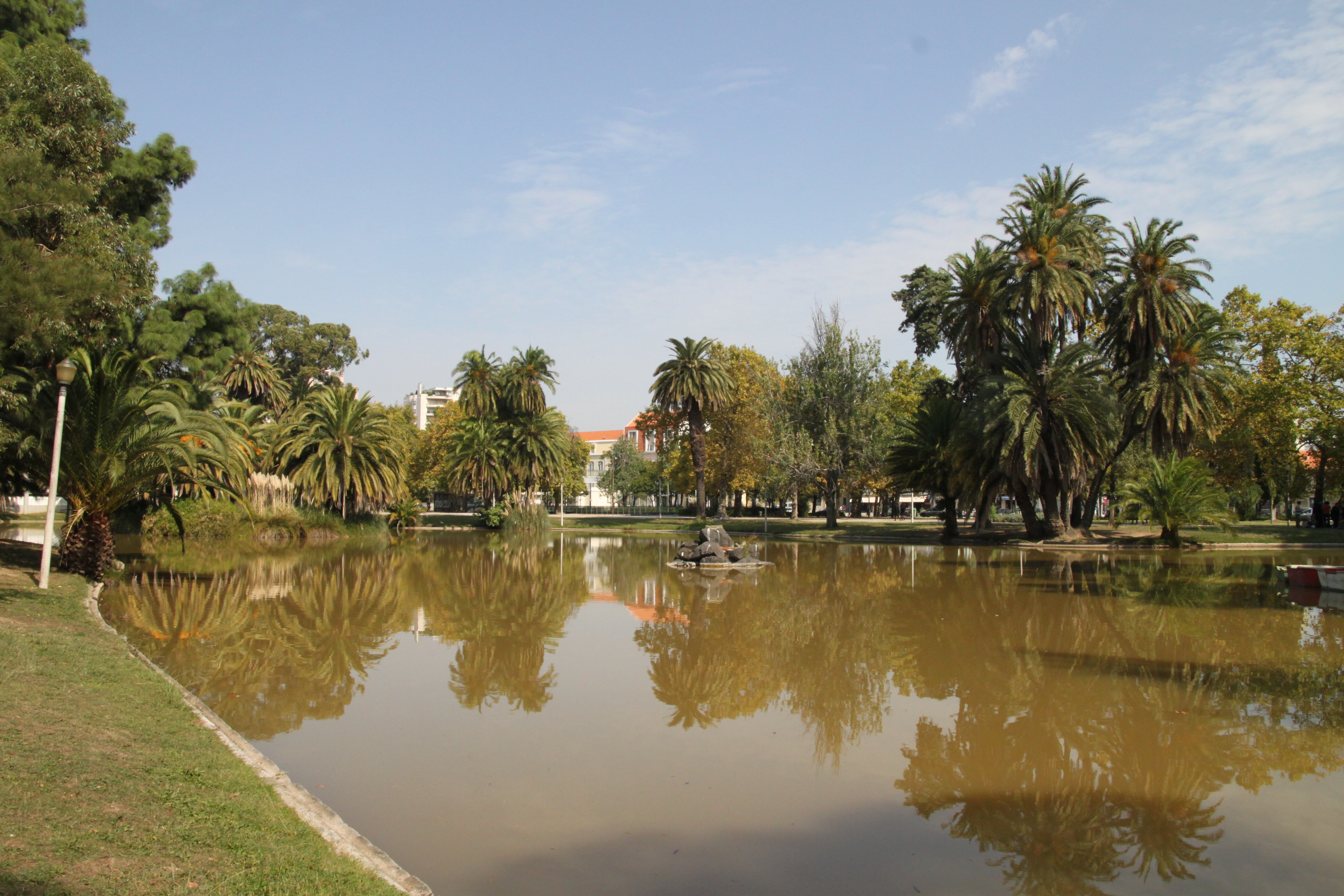
Campo Grande garden

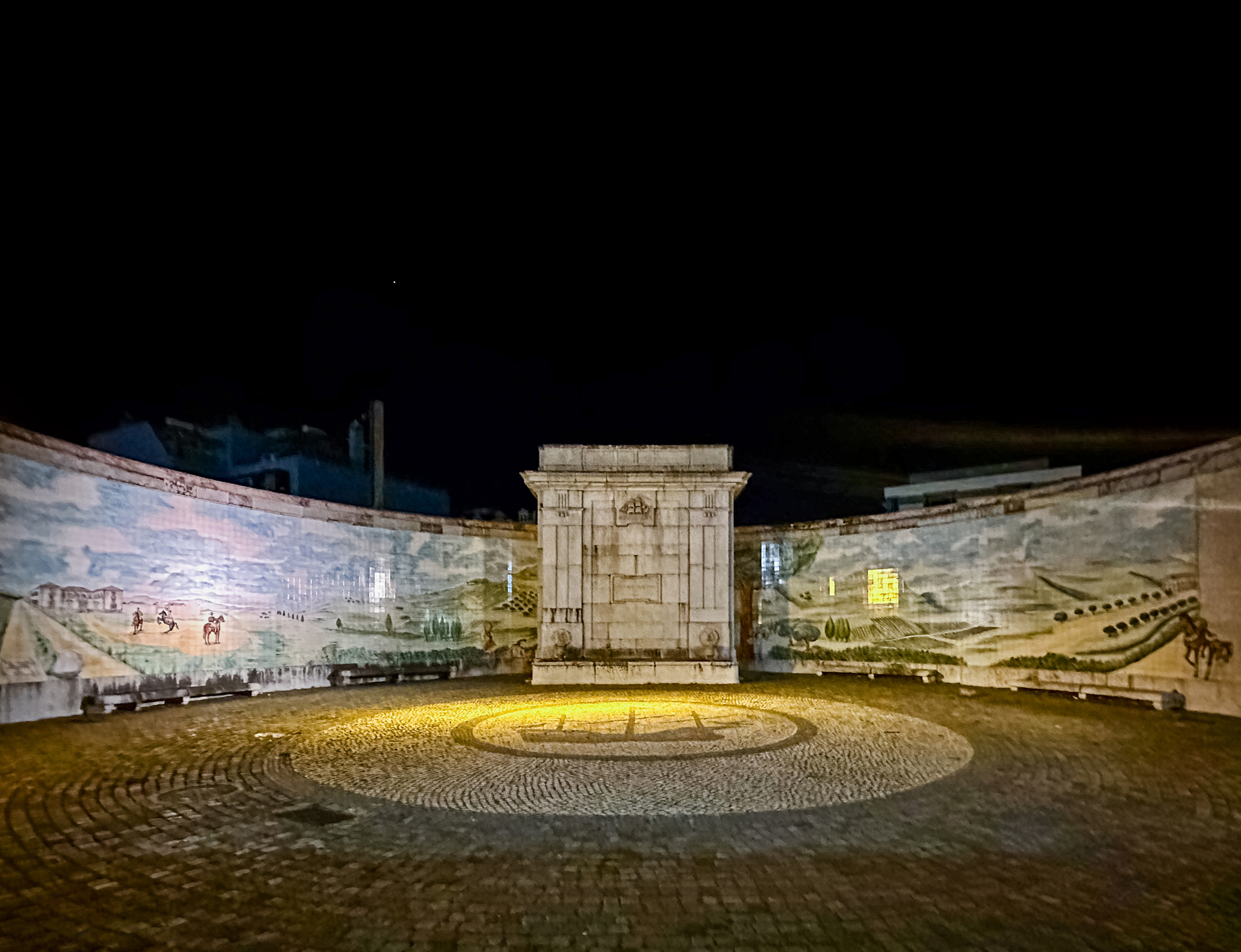
Chafariz de Entrecampos

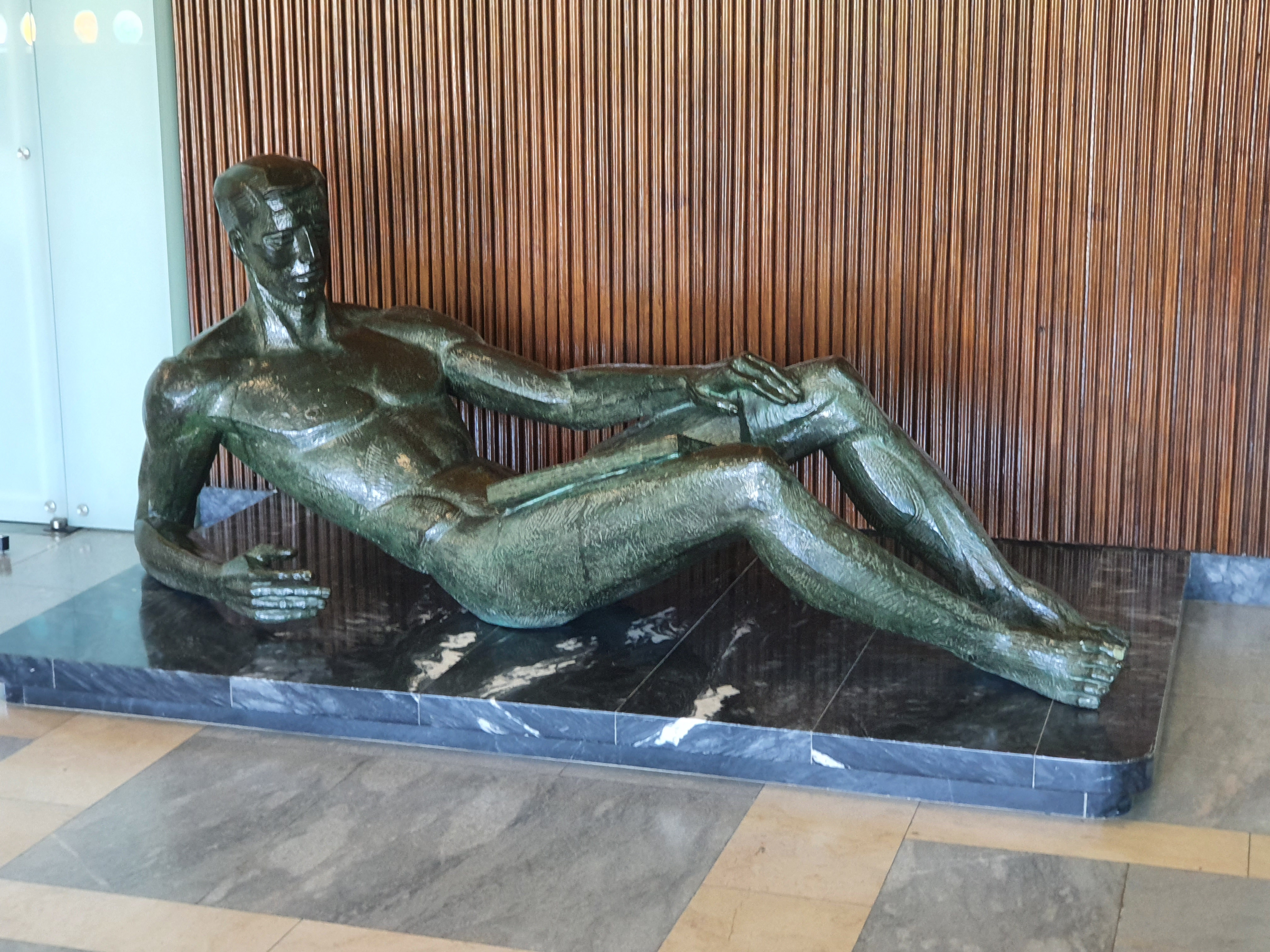
O Estudante statue

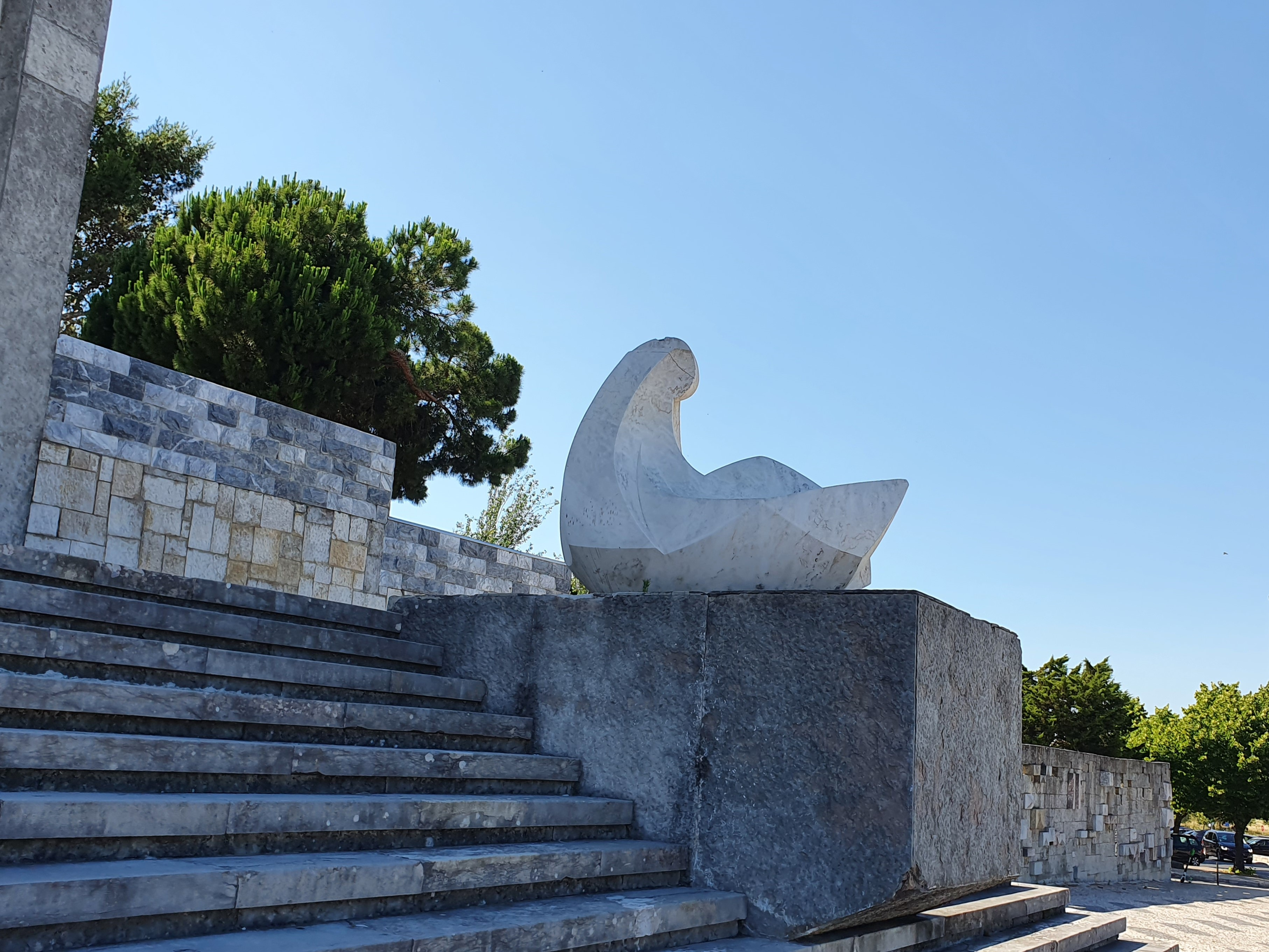
Modern monument outside Cantina Velha

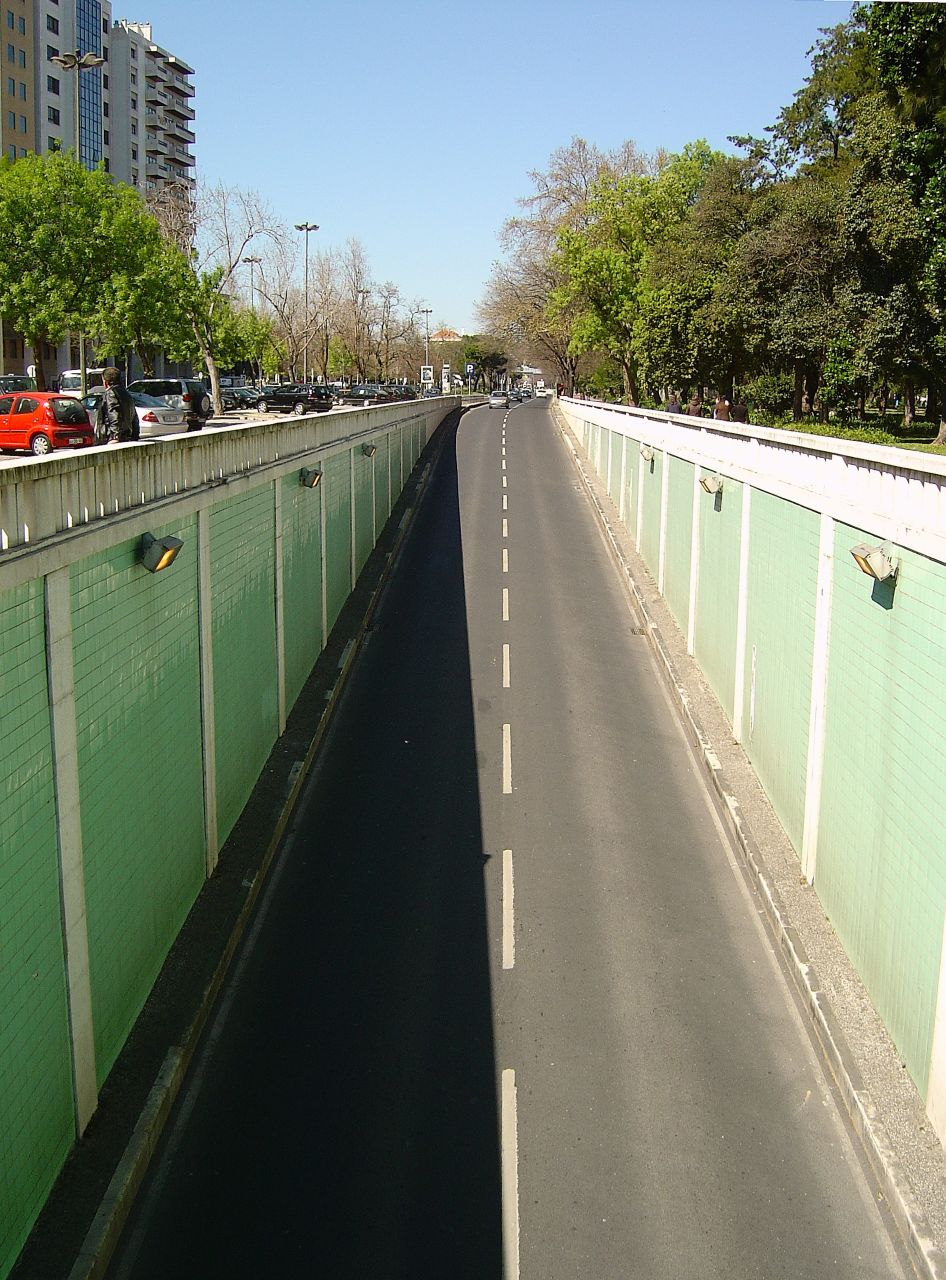
Tunnel covered in azulejos in Campo Grande

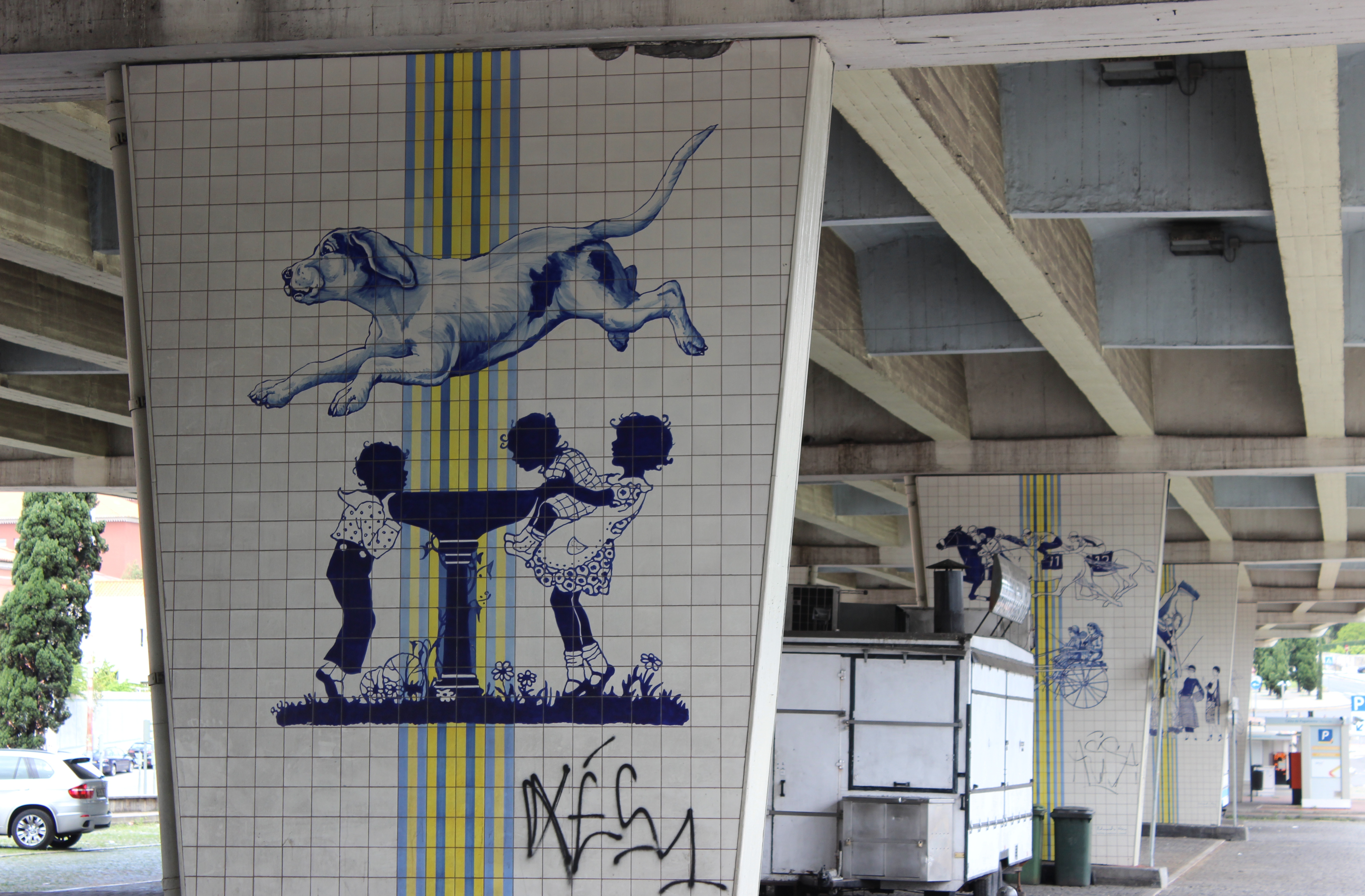
Azulejos in Campo Grande

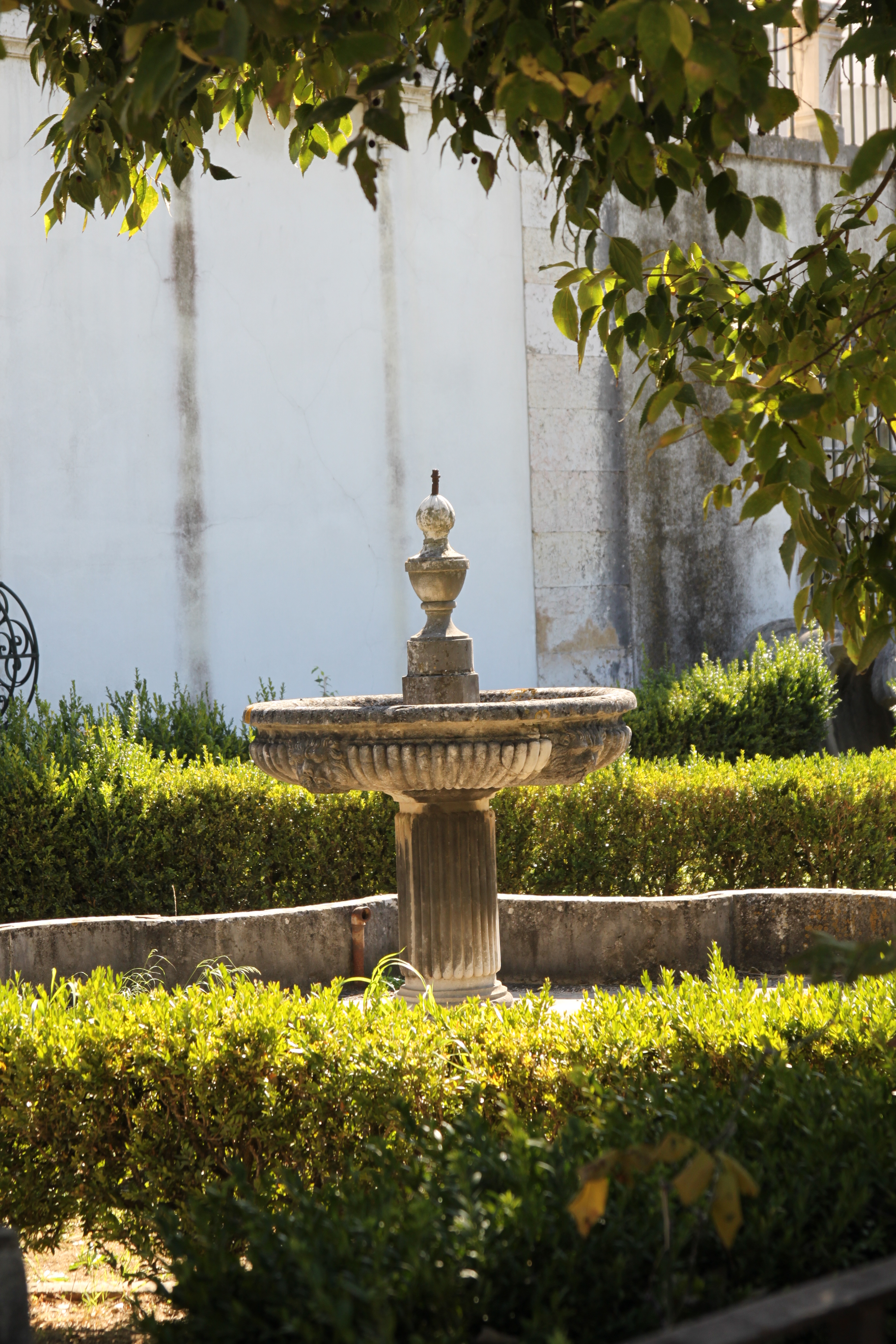
Fountain in Campo Grande

- A Mariazinha
- Ancient Cinema Alvalade
- Biblioteca Nacional de Portugal and gardens
- Building in Rua Ocidental ao Campo Grande, 101-103 or Primitiva Casa de Joaquim Pires Mendes
- Buildings of Reitoria and of Faculdade de Letras da Universidade de Lisboa and Faculdade de Direito da Universidade de Lisboa (by Porfírio Pardal Monteiro and António Pardal Monteiro and interventions of Almada Negreiros, amongst others)
- Lisbon City Hall
- Casa de Joaquim Pires Mendes, in Rua Ocidental do Campo Grande, n.º 101–103
- Chafariz de Entrecampos: Built in 1851, this fountain mirrors the Intendente fountain's structure with a simplified design. It features a rectangular volume with pilasters, a plaque reading "Câmara Municipal de Lisboa em 1851," and a tiled mural depicting the 1851 panoramic view of Vale de Entrecampos
- Cruzeiro das Laranjeiras
- Cruzeiro do Campo Grande: 17th century cruzeiro
- Escola Secundária Rainha Dona Leonor
- Escola Secundária Padre António Vieira
- Escola Eugénio dos Santos
- Hospital Júlio de Matos
- Igreja de São João de Brito
- Igreja dos Santos Reis Magos (Lisboa), also known as Igreja Paroquial do Campo Grande
- Igreja Paroquial de Santa Joana Princesa: Modern church built in 1998, with an annexed municipal auditorium amongst other facilities
- Jardim do Campo Grande, now known as the Jardim Mário Soares
- Laboratório Nacional de Engenharia Civil (National Civil Engineering Laboratory)
- Manuel Chaves Caminha library
- Miradouro do Parque José Gomes Ferreira: Viewpoint in José Gomes Ferreira park
- Museu da Cidade de Lisboa: hosted in Casa da Quinta da Pimenta (also known as Casa da Madre Paula or Palácio Galvão Mexia)
- Museu Rafael Bordalo Pinheiro: Museum built in 1914 and designed by Álvaro Augusto Machado
- Palácio do Conde de Vimioso
- Parque de Jogos 1º de Maio
- Solar da Quinta dos Lagares d'El-Rei (annexes and backyard). A part of whose land plot was granted for the construction of the recent Church of Santa Joana Princesa, designed by the architect Diogo Lino Pimentel
- Statue Arabesco: 1962 statue, by Dorita de Castel-Branco
- Statue of Saint Anthony of Lisbon: Monument unveiled on October 4, 1972, in Alvalade Square, features a 5.50m bronze statue on a pedestal of 4 marble blocks. Designed by architect Carlos Antero Ferreira and sculptor António Duarte, it portrays a preacher
- Statue of João de Deus Ramos: 1978 statue by Raul Xavier
- Statue of Paul Harris: 2006 statue by Maria Leal da Costa
- Statue known as Homenagem do povo de Lisboa às vítimas do 11 de Setembro: remembering the 2001 terrorist attack against World Trade centre, New York. By Augusto Cid, it was inaugurated on 11 October 2001. With 5 casualties holding Portuguese nationality, Portugal was the 5th most hit EU country by the terrorist attack, after, respectively, Germany, Italy, Ireland and Poland.
- Statue known as Peça figurativa "Mãe e Filho": Carved in stone, depicts a maternal figure with a child, located at the corner of Jorge Ferreira de Vasconcelos and Alfredo Cortês streets, São Miguel district
- Statues Progresso na carreira: 20 sculptures adorning futuristic Bairro das Estacas since 2021, by Robert Panda
- Statue 1ª Travessia Aérea do Atlântico Sul: Monument erected by Lisbon City Council, commemorating the first South Atlantic air crossing in 1922 by Gago Coutinho and Sacadura Cabral. Designed by Laranjeira Santos and Rodrigues Fernandes, unveiled June 17, 1972, near Belém Tower, was relocated in 2001 in Alvalade
- Statue "Potros": Two stone statues, crafted in 1946 by António Rocha Correia, placed on the walls flanking the stairs leading to the café near the Boats Lake, the northernmost lake in Campo Grande Garden.
- Statue Mulher segurando o Menino: Euclides Vaz's 1964 bronze sculpture, a woman with a child on her shoulder, unveiled by Lisbon City Council on November 27, 1997, in Campo Grande
- Statue commemorating the 25th anniversary of the Lisbon Medical Course: Monument unveiled outside Santa Maria Hospital in December 1986, commemorating the 25th Anniversary of Lisbon's Medical Course
- Statue Metropolitano de Lisboa: Sculptural ensemble dedicated to Lisbon Metro by João Charters de Almeida, crafted in 1995, unveiled in July that year near Campo Grande
- Monument Jardineiro da Cidade: Monument erected in 1985 by the city to honor the gardener. Small, it mixes materials: red cement symbolizes earth hit by the hoe, with an abstract sculpture by Domingos Soares Branco
- Statue to Juan Pablo Duarte e Díez: Juan Pablo Duarte e Díez (1813–1876), founder of the Dominican Republic, commemorated with a bronze bust unveiled in February 2011 near the Dominican Republic Embassy in Campo Grande
- Statue D. João I : Executed by Leopoldo de Almeida between 1946 and 1950, it originally stood at the Town Hall and was later moved, along with the statue of D. Afonso Henriques, to the north end of Campo Grande Garden. Inaugurated on August 31, 1997, replacing the statue of Marechal Carmona
- Statue mulher vendo-se ao espelho: Statue by Canto da Maia, 1949, depicts a full-length female figure looking into a mirror. Originally bronze, it's now stone, installed near Boats Lake in Campo Grande Garden
- Statue Luís de Camões: Granite statue by Euclides Vaz honors Luís Vaz de Camões (1524–1580), renowned Portuguese poet known for "The Lusiads". Inaugurated April 10, 1969, at Campo Grande's Biblioteca Nacional garden
- Statue José Pinto Peixoto: Bronze full-body statue on stone base by Laranjeira Santos, honoring José Pinto Peixoto (1922–1996). Inaugurated May 30, 2003, at Campo Grande
- Statue Gil Vicente: Granite statue by Joaquim Martins Correia honors Gil Vicente (1465–1536), considered the father of Portuguese theater. Inaugurated April 10, 1969, at Campo Grande's Biblioteca Nacional garden
- Statue Fernão Lopes: Granite statue by Joaquim Martins Correia honors Fernão Lopes (1380–1460), renowned Portuguese chronicler and pioneer of national historiography. Inaugurated April 10, 1969, at Campo Grande's Biblioteca Nacional garden
- Statue Eça de Queiroz: Granite statue by Álvaro de Brée honors Eça de Queiroz (1845–1900), one of the greatest literary figures of the 19th century. Inaugurated April 10, 1969, at Campo Grande's Biblioteca Nacional garden
- Statue D. Pedro V: Marble statue by Joaquim Martins Correia honors King D. Pedro V (1853–1861), known for advancing culture and education. Inaugurated in 1960 near Faculdade de Letras de Lisboa
- Statue Álvaro Pais: Bronze statue by Joaquim Martins Correia honors a wealthy bourgeois family member who served as Chancellor to Kings D. Pedro and D. Fernando, supporting the Aviz Master during the 1383-1385 Revolution. Inaugurated on October 25, 1981, near Faculdade de Direito at Alameda da Universidade
- Statue "O saber": Bronze statue on a stone base, portraying a larger-than-life male figure, sculpted by António Duarte between 1960 and 1962. Placed on the facade of Biblioteca Nacional (facing the amphitheater) during its inauguration at Campo Grande on April 10, 1969
- Statuary complex dedicated to sports, these include: Statue to American football (1958, Manuel Marques Borges), Statue to discus throwers (1958, Helena Matos), Statue to the Hammer Thrower (1959, Manuel Marques Borges), Statue to the athlete (1955, Helder Baptista), Statue to high jump (1967, Luzia), statue to Running (1958, Stella de Albuquerque), statue to ski (1958, Gabriela), statue to weightlifting (1958, José Laranjeira Santos)
- Statue Egas Moniz: Renowned psychiatrist António Caetano de Abreu Freire de Egas Moniz (1874–1955), Nobel laureate for Medicine in 1949, honored with a bronze statue by Euclides Vaz in 1974 at Santa Maria Hospital gardens
- Statue Despertar: Artwork consists of two tall, black-painted metal structures resembling opening flowers. Created by Rui Chafes, donated by the artist, unveiled outside Santa Maria Hospital for its fiftieth anniversary in 2004
- Statue "Escultura abstrata": Fernando Conduto's abstract sculpture, unveiled in February 1984 near building no. 28 in Campo Grande, features metallic iron with epoxy paint on a stone base
- Statue commemorating the 50th Anniversary of the University Stadium: José Rodrigues' sculpture at Lisbon University Stadium, inaugurated May 27, 2006, features a metallic iron "U" topped with two bronze figures
- Statue "A Cultura": António Duarte's bronze statue of a larger-than-life female, created between 1960 and 1962, placed at Biblioteca Nacional's facade during its inauguration on April 10, 1969, at Campo Grande
- Statue D.Afonso Henriques: Stone statue of D. Afonso Henriques (1110–1185), Portugal's first king, stands 2.80m tall on a rectangular stone base. Crafted by Leopoldo de Almeida between 1946 and 1950, originally at the Town Hall and later relocated with D. João I's statue to the north end of Campo Grande Garden in 1997, replacing the Marshal Carmona Statue
- Statue Rafael Bordalo Pinheiro: The monument to Mário Soares features a bronze bust, palm, and base on a limestone plinth. Created by Raul Xavier and J. Alexandre Soares, it was inaugurated on March 20, 1921, in Campo Grande Garden
- Statue António Pedro: Costa Motta's bronze bust of António Pedro de Sousa, a famed Portuguese actor of the 19th century, stands on a stone pedestal in Campo Grande Garden, inaugurated on July 23, 1959
- Statue Aos Heróis da Guerra Peninsular: Monument in Praça Mouzinho de Albuquerque, inaugurated January 8, 1933, depicts the expulsion of Napoleon's troops. Sculpted by José de Oliveira Ferreira in stone and bronze, honoring the heroes of the Peninsular War
- Torre do Tombo National Archive

== Headquarters and Branches of the Parish Council (Junta de Freguesia) ==
- Headquarter/ Serviços Centrais (Alvalade) - Largo Machado de Assis, S/N
- Subsidiary "Polo Azinhaga dos Barros" / Pavilhão Municipal da Freguesia de Alvalade (Campo Grande) - Rua Mem de Sá, S/N
- Subsidiary "Polo Av. Rio de Janeiro" / Biblioteca Manoel Chaves Caminha (São João de Brito) - Avenida Rio de Janeiro, 30-A

== Streets ==
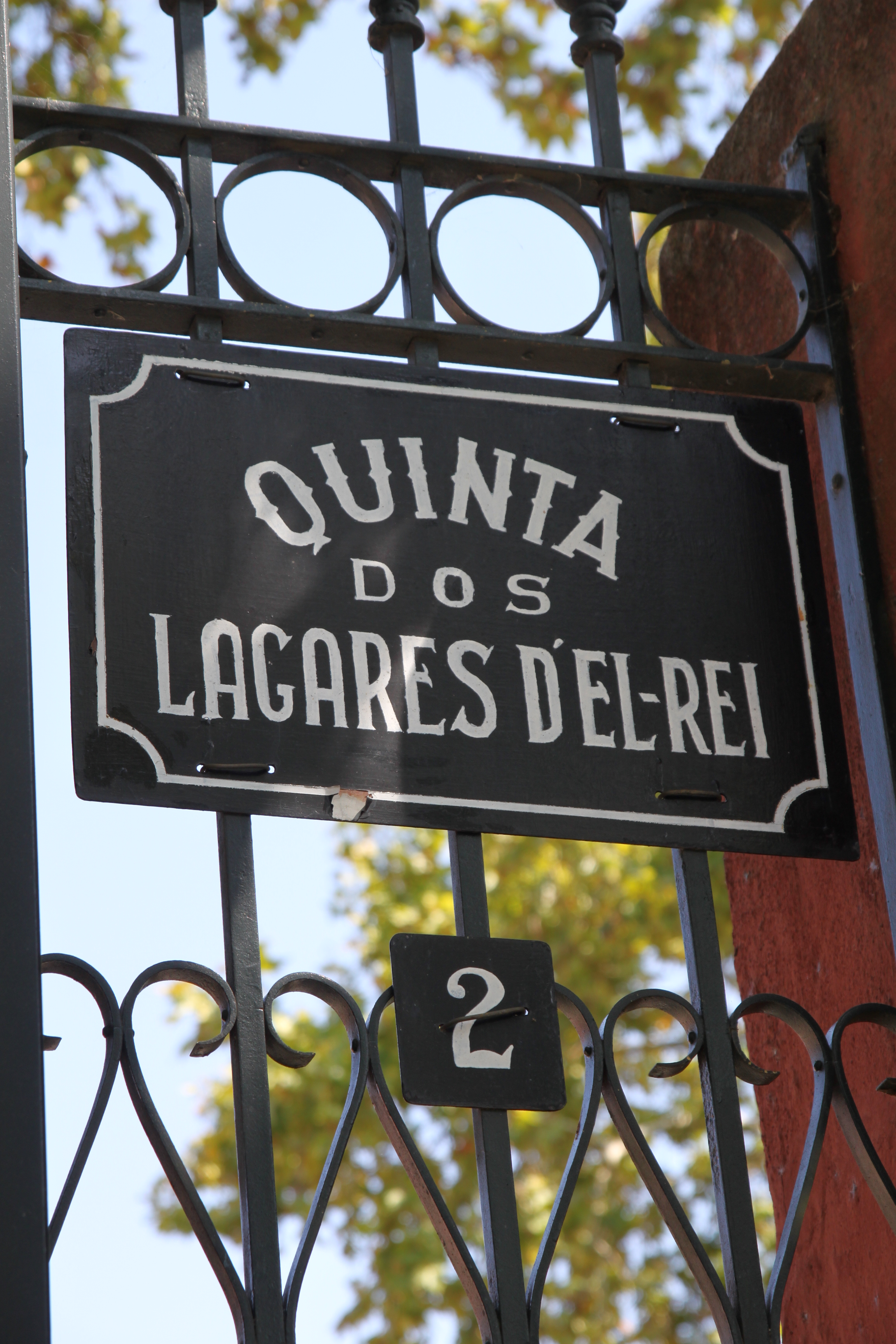
Quinta dos Lagares d'El-Rei

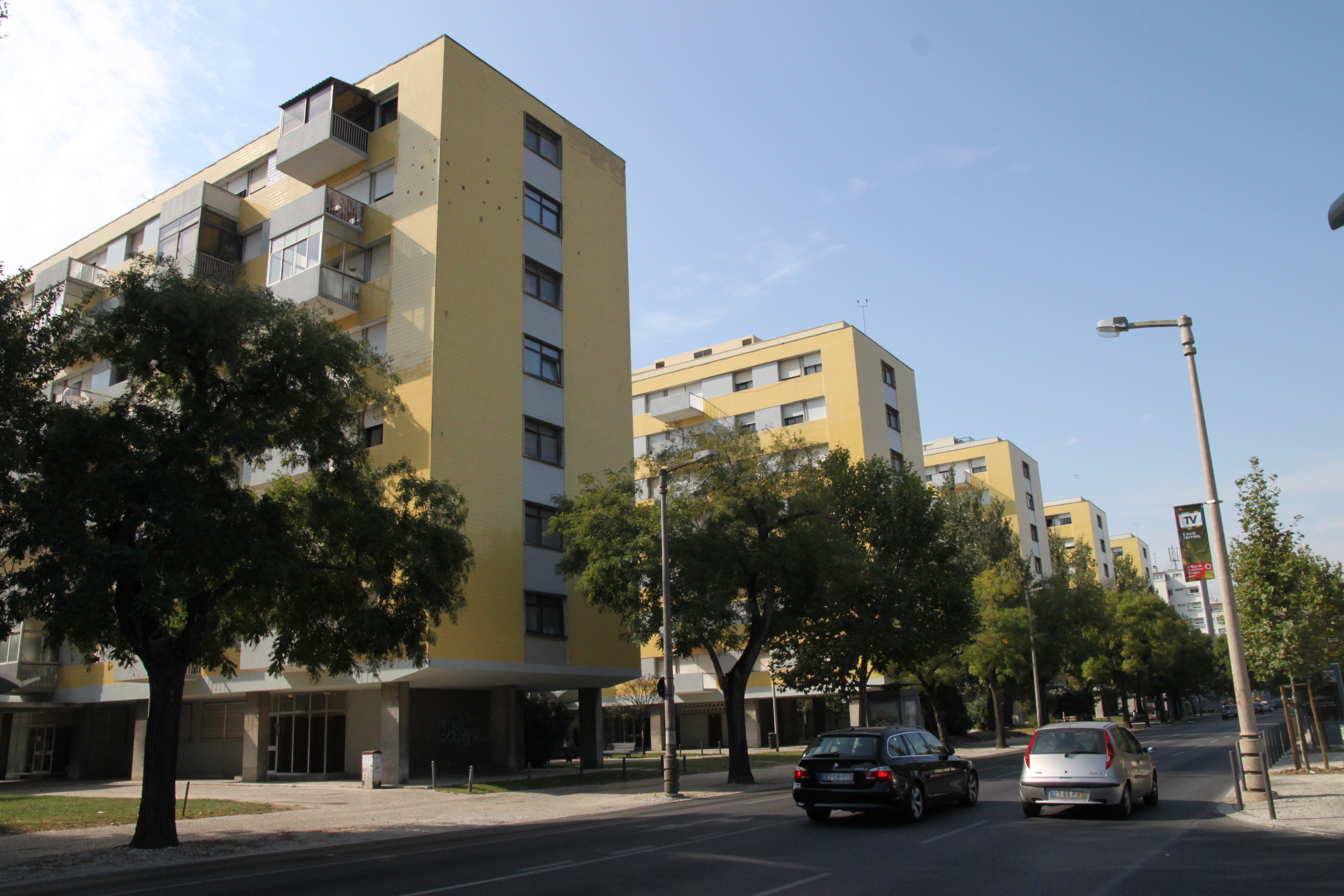
Residential buildings in Avenida do Brasil

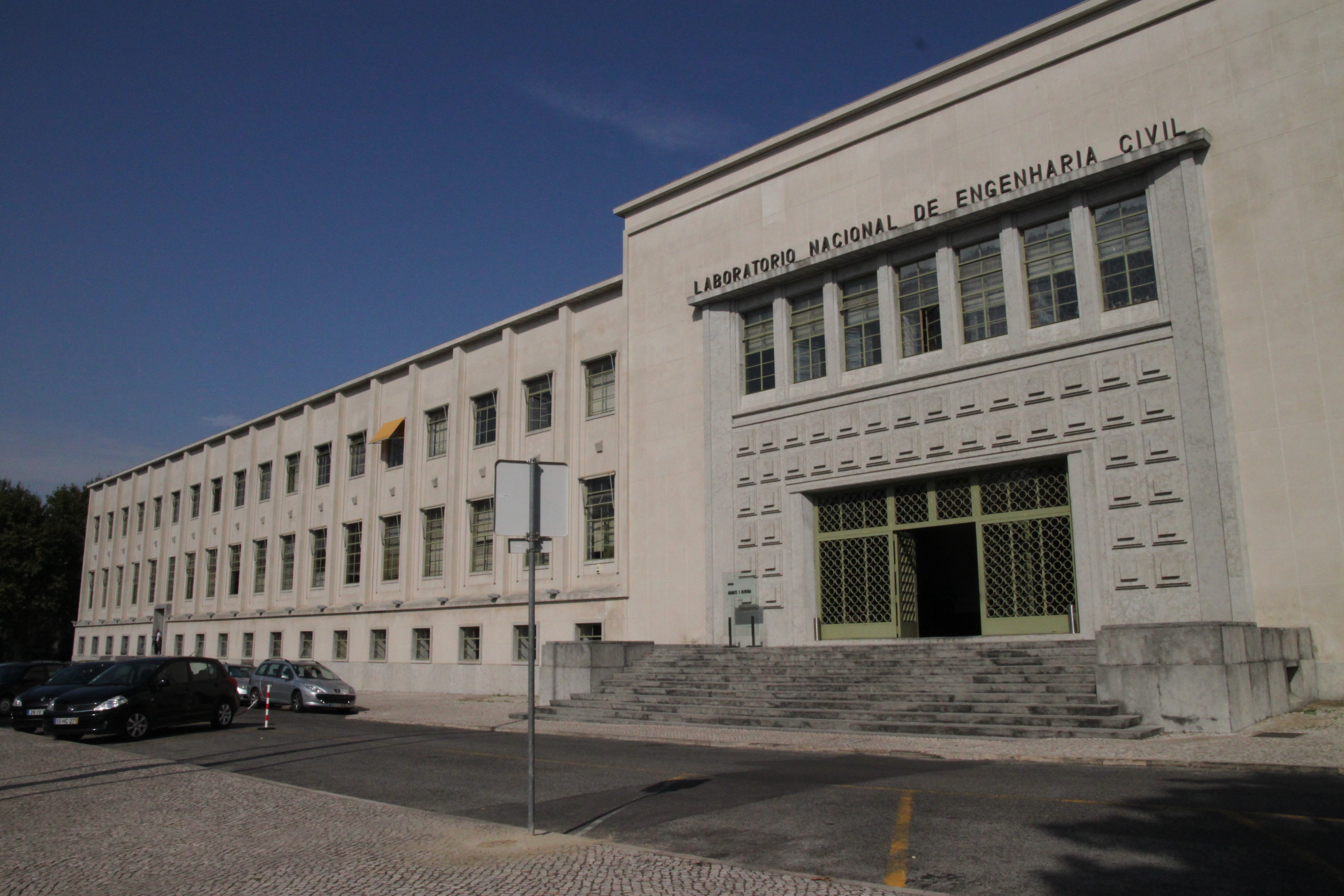
Laboratório Nacional de Engenharia Civil

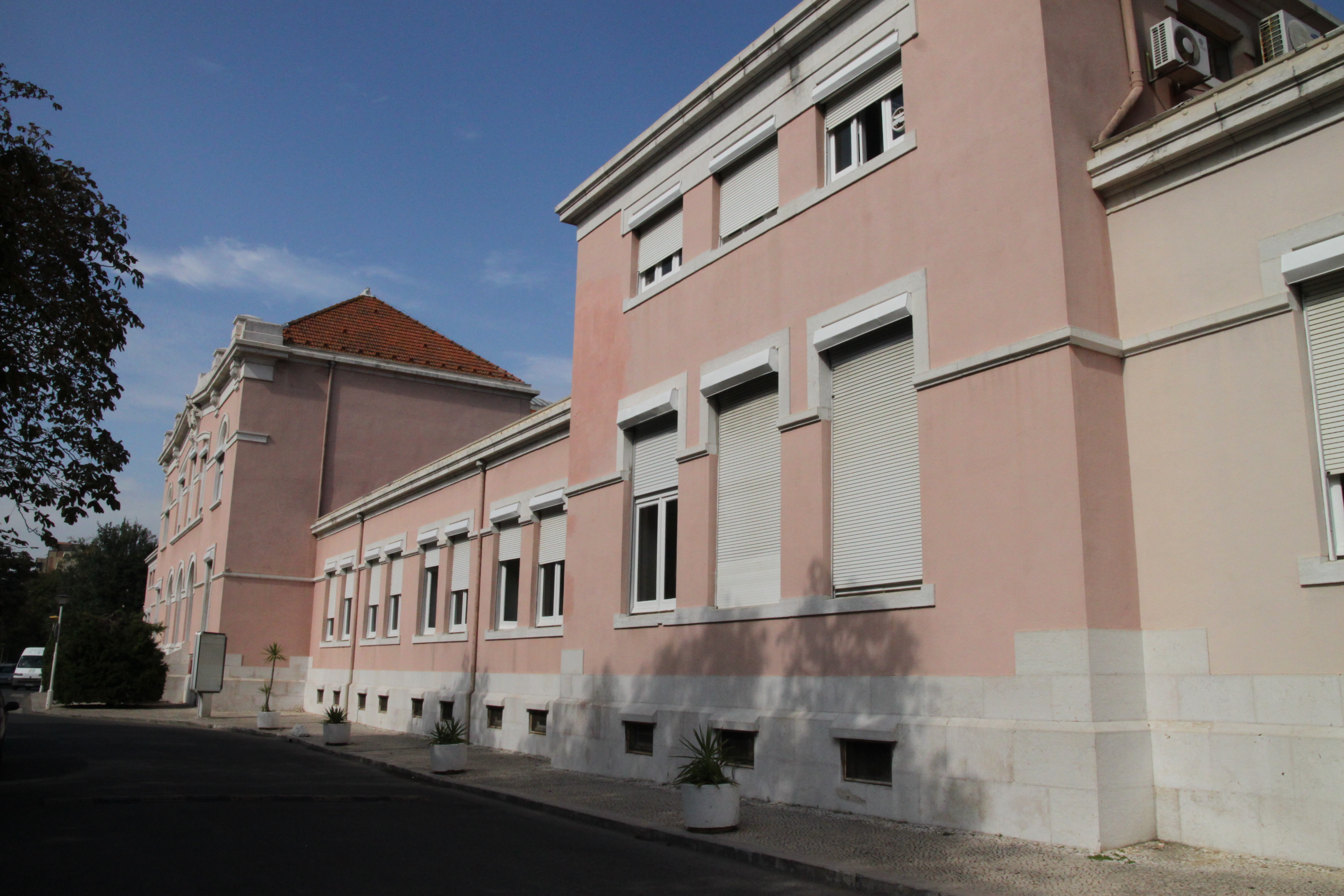
Hospital Júlio de Matos

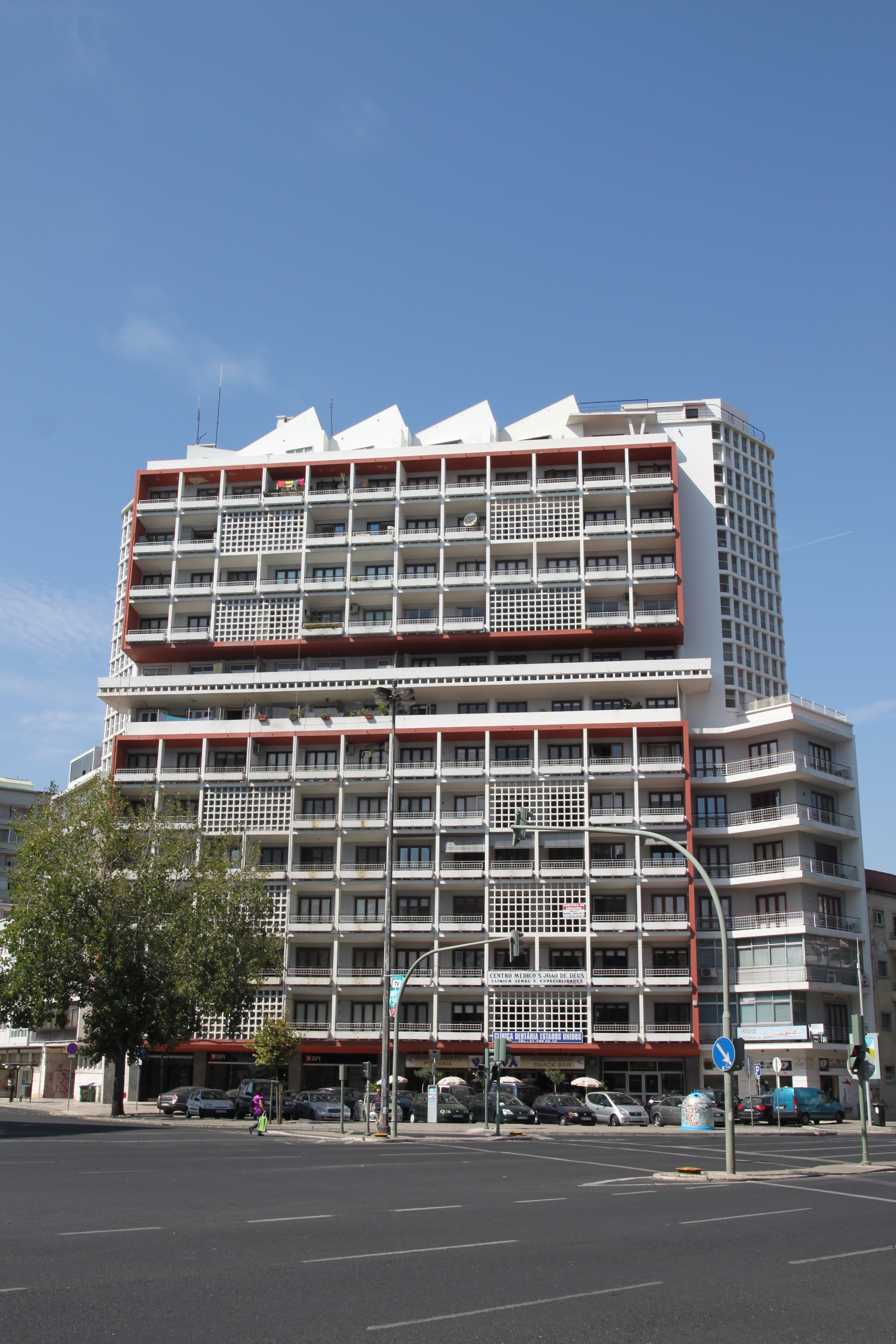
Intersection of Avenida de Roma and Avenida dos EUA

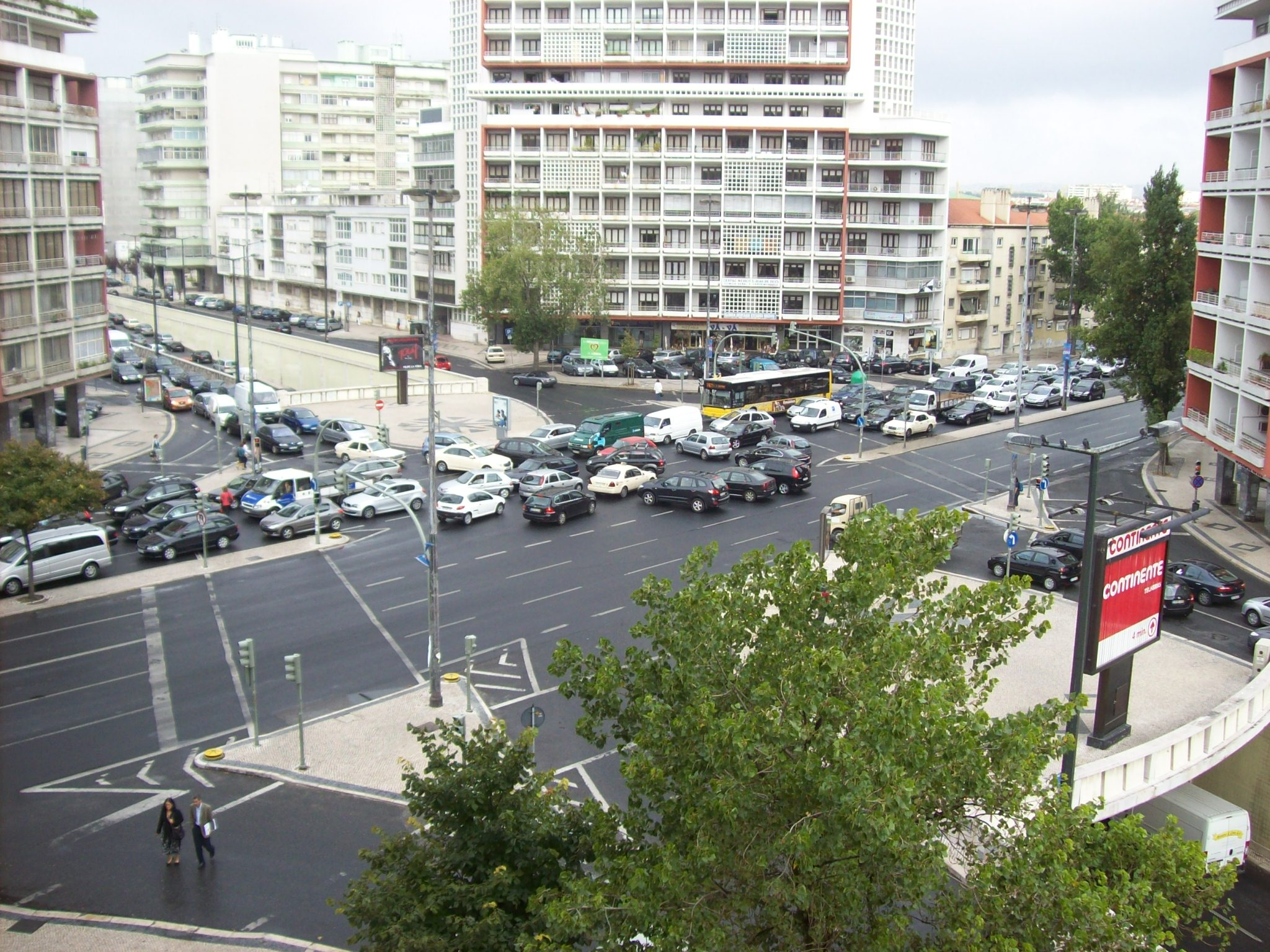
Traffic jam in Avenida de Roma

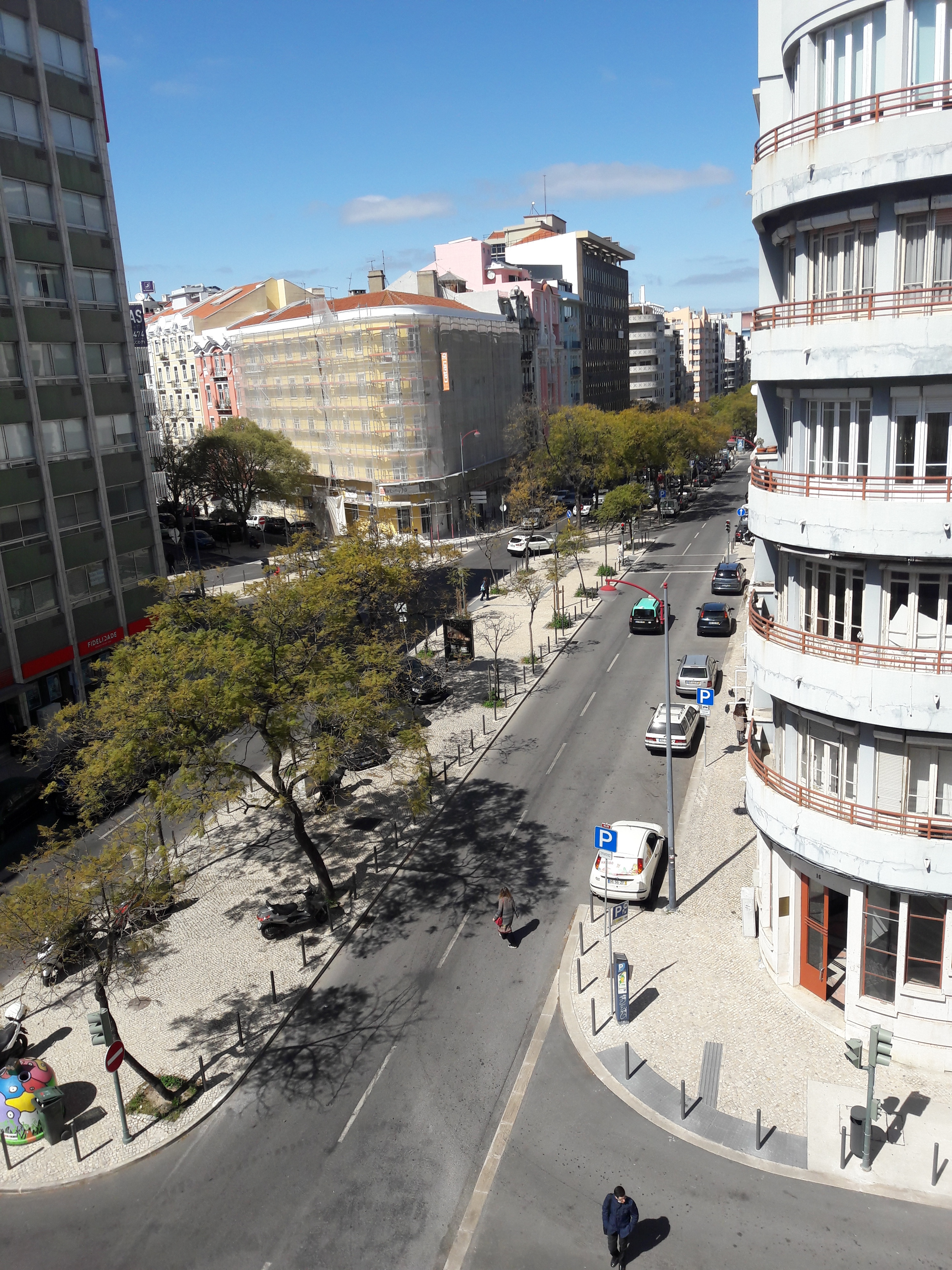
Avenida 5 de Outubro

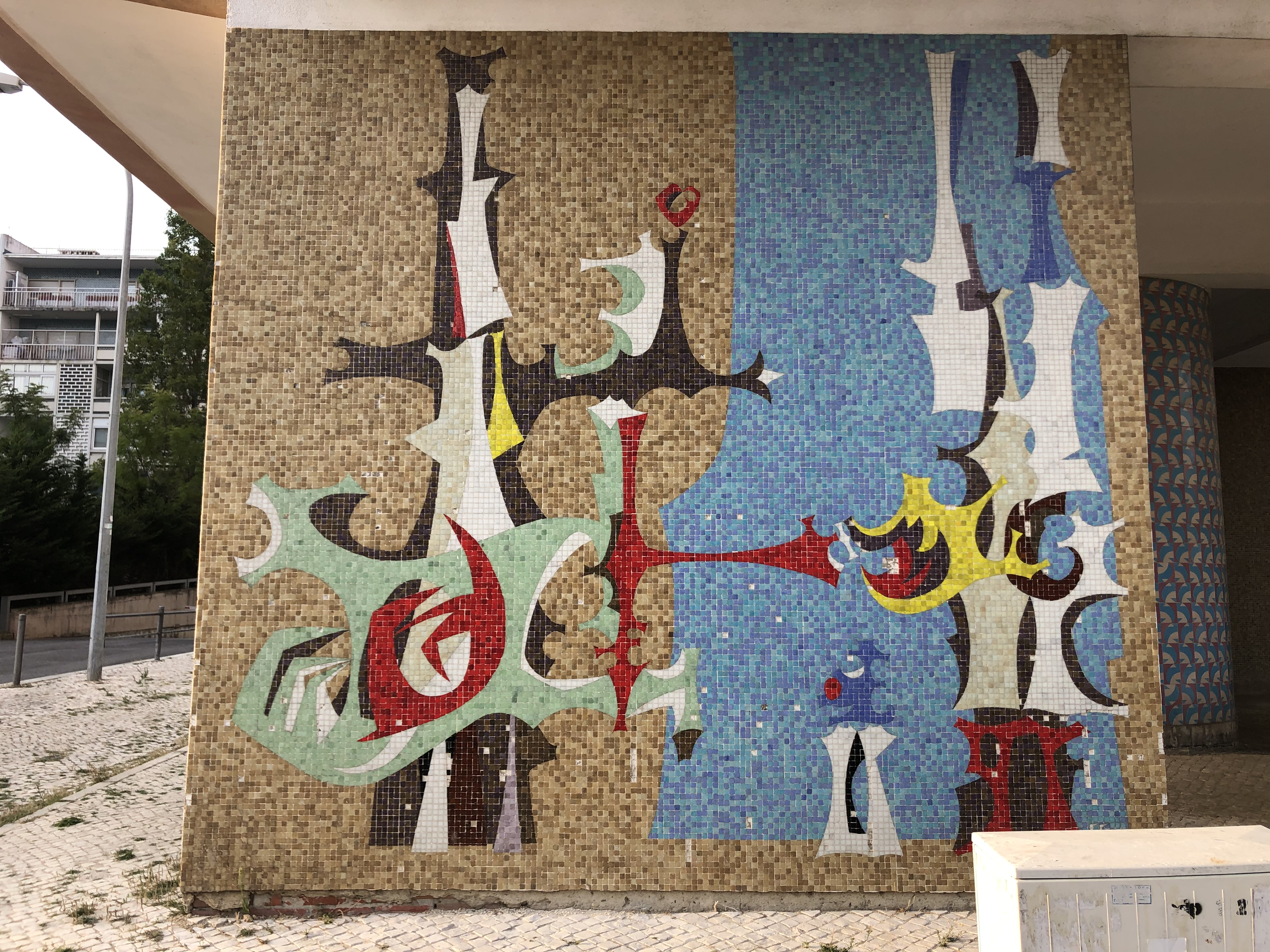
Mural in Avenida dos Estados Unidos da América

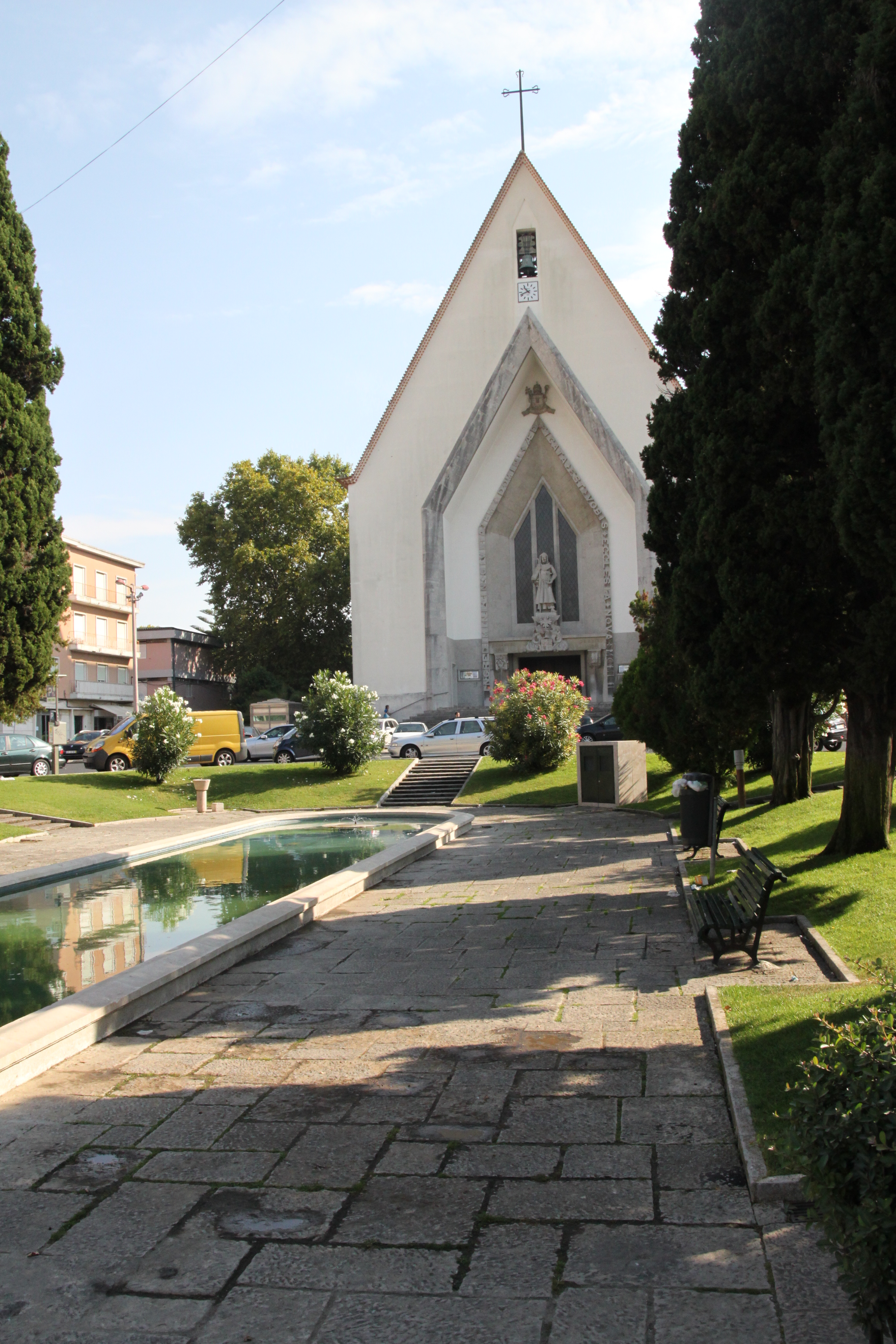
Garden of Largo Frei Heitor Pinto

The parish has 194 streets administered by the city council. They are:

- Alameda da Universidade
- Alameda das Linhas de Torres
- Autoparque Sabugosa
- Avenida Almirante Gago Coutinho
- Avenida Álvaro Pais
- Avenida Cinco de Outubro
- Avenida da Igreja
- Avenida da República
- Avenida de Roma
- Avenida do Brasil
- Avenida do Rio de Janeiro
- Avenida Dom Rodrigo da Cunha
- Avenida dos Combatentes
- Avenida dos Estados Unidos da América
- Avenida Frei Miguel Contreiras
- Avenida General Norton de Matos
- Avenida José Régio
- Avenida Lusíada
- Avenida Marechal António de Spínola
- Avenida Marechal Craveiro Lopes
- Avenida Manuel Gomes da Costa
- Avenida Francisco Rodrigues da Cruz
- Avenida Professor Aníbal de Bettencourt
- Avenida Professor Egas Moniz
- Avenida Professor Gama Pinto
- Avenida Rui Nogueira Simões
- Avenida Santa Joana Princesa
- Azinhaga da Fonte do Louro
- Azinhaga das Galhardas
- Azinhaga das Murtas
- Azinhaga dos Barros
- Campo Grande
- Estrada da Portela
- Jardim Eduardo Teixeira Coelho
- Jardim Manuel Azevedo Coutinho
- Jardim Mário Soares
- Jardim Ruy Jervis d'Athouguia
- Largo Central
- Largo Cristóvão Aires
- Largo do Pote de Água
- Largo Fernandes Costa
- Largo Frei Heitor Pinto
- Largo Frei Luís de Sousa
- Largo João Vaz
- Largo Machado de Assis
- Largo Ribeiro Cristino
- Largo Rodrigues Cordeiro
- Miradouro de São João de Brito
- Praça Andrade Caminha
- Praça de Alvalade
- Praça do Aeroporto
- Praça Francisco de Morais
- Praça Gonçalo Trancoso
- Rua Aboim Ascensão
- Rua Acácio de Paiva
- Rua Afonso Lopes Vieira
- Rua Alberto de Oliveira
- Rua Alberto Osório de Castro
- Rua Alexandre Rey Colaço
- Rua Alferes Malheiro
- Rua Alfredo Cortês
- Rua Alfredo Mesquita
- Rua Antero de Figueiredo
- Rua Antónia Pusich
- Rua António Albino Machado
- Rua António Andrade
- Rua António Aniceto Monteiro
- Rua António Ferreira
- Rua António Patrício
- Rua António Ramalho
- Rua Aprígio Mafra
- Rua Augusto Gil
- Rua Azevedo Neves
- Rua Bernarda Ferreira de Lacerda
- Rua Branca de Gonta Colaço
- Rua Branca Edmée Marques
- Rua Bulhão Pato
- Rua Camilo Pessanha
- Rua Carlos de Seixas
- Rua Carlos Lobo d'Ávila
- Rua Carlos Malheiro Dias
- Rua Carlos Mayer
- Rua Castelo Branco Chaves
- Rua Cipriano Martins
- Rua Conde de Arnoso
- Rua Conde de Ficalho
- Rua Conde de Sabugosa
- Rua Constantino Fernandes
- Rua Coronel Bento Roma
- Rua Coronel Marques Leitão
- Rua das Camélias
- Rua das Mimosas
- Rua das Murtas
- Rua David de Sousa
- Rua de Entrecampos
- Rua de São João de Brito
- Rua de Trás-os-Montes
- Rua Diogo Bernardes
- Rua do Bairro
- Rua do Centro Cultural
- Rua do Sol ao Bairro de São João de Brito
- Rua Dom Alberto Bramão
- Rua Dom Francisco de Sousa Coutinho
- Rua Dom Luís da Cunha
- Rua Dom Pedro de Cristo
- Rua Domingos Bomtempo
- Rua dos Lagares D'El-Rei
- Rua dos Resistentes
- Rua Dr. Gama Barros
- Rua Dr. João Soares
- Rua Duarte Lobo
- Rua Eduardo de Noronha
- Rua Eduardo Vidal
- Rua Eng.º Caldeira Rodrigues
- Rua Engenheiro Manuel Rocha
- Rua Epifânio Dias
- Rua Ernesto de Vasconcelos
- Rua Esmeraldo de Oliveira Cruz
- Rua Eugénio de Castro
- Rua Eugénio de Castro Rodrigues
- Rua Fausto Guedes Teixeira
- Rua Fernando Caldeira
- Rua Fernando Pessoa
- Rua Fernão Álvares do Oriente
- Rua Filipe Magalhães
- Rua Florbela Espanca
- Rua Flores do Lima
- Rua Francisco Andrade
- Rua Francisco Franco
- Rua Francisco Lourenço da Fonseca
- Rua Frei Amador Arrais
- Rua Frei Joaquim de Santa Rosa de Viterbo
- Rua Frei Manuel Cardoso
- Rua Frei Tomé de Jesus
- Rua General Firmino Miguel
- Rua General Pimenta de Castro
- Rua Guilherme de Azevedo
- Rua Guilherme de Faria
- Rua Guilhermina Suggia
- Rua Helena Félix
- Rua Infante Dom Pedro
- Rua Jerónimo Corte-Real
- Rua João de Deus Ramos
- Rua João Lúcio
- Rua João Ribas
- Rua João Saraiva
- Rua João Villaret
- Rua Joaquim Maria Fernandes Marques
- Rua Joaquim Rocha Cabral
- Rua Jorge Colaço
- Rua Jorge Ferreira de Vasconcelos
- Rua José Carlos dos Santos
- Rua José d'Esaguy
- Rua José Duro
- Rua José Lins do Rego
- Rua José Pinheiro de Melo
- Rua José Santa Camarão
- Rua Lopes de Mendonça
- Rua Lúcio de Azevedo
- Rua Luís Augusto Palmeirim
- Rua Madre Purificação dos Anjos Silva
- Rua Maria Amália Vaz de Carvalho
- Rua Mário de Sá Carneiro
- Rua Marquês do Soveral
- Rua Marquesa de Alorna
- Rua Mem de Sá
- Rua Muniz Barreto
- Rua Moura Girão
- Rua Nuno Ferrari
- Rua Odette de Saint-Maurice
- Rua Oliveira Martins
- Rua Paul Choffat
- Rua Paul Harris
- Rua Pedro Ivo
- Rua Prof. António Flores
- Rua Prof. Oliveira Marques
- Rua Prof.ª Teresa Ambrósio
- Rua Professor Veiga Beirão
- Rua Raúl Brandão
- Rua Reinaldo Ferreira
- Rua Ricardo Jorge
- Rua Rosália de Castro
- Rua Silva e Albuquerque
- Rua Teixeira de Pascoais
- Rua Tomás da Fonseca
- Rua Viana da Mota
- Rua Violante do Céu
- Rua Visconde de Seabra
- Travessa Aboim Ascensão
- Travessa da Fonte
- Travessa do Chafariz ao Bairro de São João de Brito
- Travessa do Pote de Água
- Travessa Henrique Cardoso
