= 2025 in public domain =

Worldwide map of copyright term length

When a work's copyright expires, it enters the public domain. Since laws vary globally, the copyright status of works is not uniform. The following lists list creators whose works entered the public domain in 2025.

== Countries with life + 50 years ==
In most countries of Africa and Asia, as well as Belarus, Bolivia and New Zealand, a work enters the public domain 50 years after the creator's death.

Names	Country	Death	Occupation	Notable work
Jean Absil	Belgium	2 February 1974	Composer	
Gilbert Archey	New Zealand	20 October 1974	Zoologist	The Moa, a Study of the Dinornithiformes
Miguel Ángel Asturias	Guatemala	9 June 1974	Poet-diplomat	El Señor Presidente
Farid al-Atrash	Egypt	26 December 1974	Composer	
Kurt Atterberg	Sweden	15 February 1974	Composer	Compositions
H. E. Bates	United Kingdom	29 January 1974	Writer	The Darling Buds of May
Erick Berry	United States	February 1974	Writer	The Winged Girl of Knossos
Bobby Bloom	United States	28 February 1974	Singer-songwriter	"Montego Bay"
Hector Bolitho	New Zealand	12 September 1974	Writer	Albert the Good and the Victorian Reign
Buddhadeb Bosu	Bangladesh	1974	Writer	
Jorge Camargo Spolidore	Colombia	29 January 1974	Composer	"Chatica Linda"
Rosario Castellanos	Mexico	7 August 1974	Poet, novelist	The Nine Guardians
Nellie Coad	New Zealand	6 September 1974	Teacher, writer	
Phillis Emily Cunnington	United Kingdom	24 October 1974	Physician, historian	Handbook of English Mediaeval Costume
Maurice Duggan	New Zealand	11 December 1974	Writer	Summer in the Gravel Pit
Duke Ellington	United States	24 May 1974	Composer	Duke Ellington discography
Julius Evola	Italy	11 June 1974	Philosopher	Revolt Against the Modern World
Allal al-Fassi	Morocco	13 May 1974	Writer	The Independence Movements in Arab North Africa
Dorothy Fields	United States	28 March 1974	Film lyricist	"The Way You Look Tonight"
Louise Fitzhugh	United States	19 November 1974	Writer	Harriet the Spy
Georgette Heyer	United Kingdom	4 July 1974	Writer	List of works by Georgette Heyer
Ali Ismael	Egypt	16 June 1974	Composer	Fida'i
Marie Luise Kaschnitz	Germany	10 October 1974	Writer	Menschen und Dinge 1945
Erich Kästner	Germany	29 July 1974	Poet, screenwriter	Emil and the Detectives
Muhammad Ayub Khan	Pakistan	19 April 1974	Politician	Books
Pär Lagerkvist	Sweden	11 July 1974	Writer	Barabbas
Eve Langley	New Zealand	1 June 1974	Writer	The Pea-Pickers
Charles Lindbergh	United States	26 August 1974	Aviator, writer	"WE", The Spirit of St. Louis
Eric Linklater	United Kingdom	7 November 1974	Writer, poet	The Wind on the Moon
Walter Lippmann	United States	14 December 1974	Writer	Public Opinion
Margaret MacPherson	New Zealand	14 September 1974	Writer, journalist	A Symposium Against War
P. Schuyler Miller	United States	13 October 1974	Writer	
Henry de Monfreid	France	13 December 1974	Adventurer, writer	Secrets of the Red Sea
Stanley Mullen	United States	1974	Artist, writer	Kinsmen of the Dragon
Leslie Munro	New Zealand	13 February 1974	Politician, writer	United Nations: hope for a divided world
Douglas Robb	New Zealand	1974	Physician, writer	Medical Odyssey
David Alfaro Siqueiros	Mexico	6 January 1974	Painter, muralist	Portrait of the Bourgeoisie (1939–1940), The March of Humanity (1957–1971)
William Sloane	United States	25 September 1974	Writer	To Walk the Night
Zaharia Stancu	Romania	5 December 1974	Writer	Through the Ashes of the Empire
Sheila Stuart	United Kingdom	1974	Writer	Alison's Highland Holiday
Jacqueline Susann	United States	21 September 1974	Writer	Valley of the Dolls
Sándor Szathmári	Hungary	16 July 1974	Writer, mechanical engineer	Kazohinia
Whanki Kim	South Korea	25 July 1974	Painter	What Form, Shall We Meet Again? (어디서 무엇이 되어 다시 만나랴)
Robert Charles Zaehner	United Kingdom	24 November 1974	Scholar	Zurvan, Mysticism, Our Savage God

== Countries with life + 60 years ==
In Bangladesh, Haiti, India, and Venezuela a work enters the public domain 60 years after the creator's death.

Names	Country	Death	Occupation	Notable work
Dr. Atl	Mexico	15 August 1964	Painter, writer	
Fernando Leal	Mexico	7 October 1964	Painter, muralist, lithographer, engraver	
Bharathidasan	India	21 April 1964	Poet	"Tamil Thai Valthu"
Birinchi Kumar Barua	India	30 March 1964	Scholar, writer	
Carlos Brandt	Venezuela	27 February 1964	Writer	
Guru Dutt	India	10 October 1964	Film director	Pyaasa
Ian Fleming	United Kingdom	12 August 1964	Writer	James Bond
Mushtaq Hussain Khan	India	13 August 1964	Musician	
Jawaharlal Nehru	India	27 May 1964	Politician	An Autobiography

== Countries with life + 70 years ==
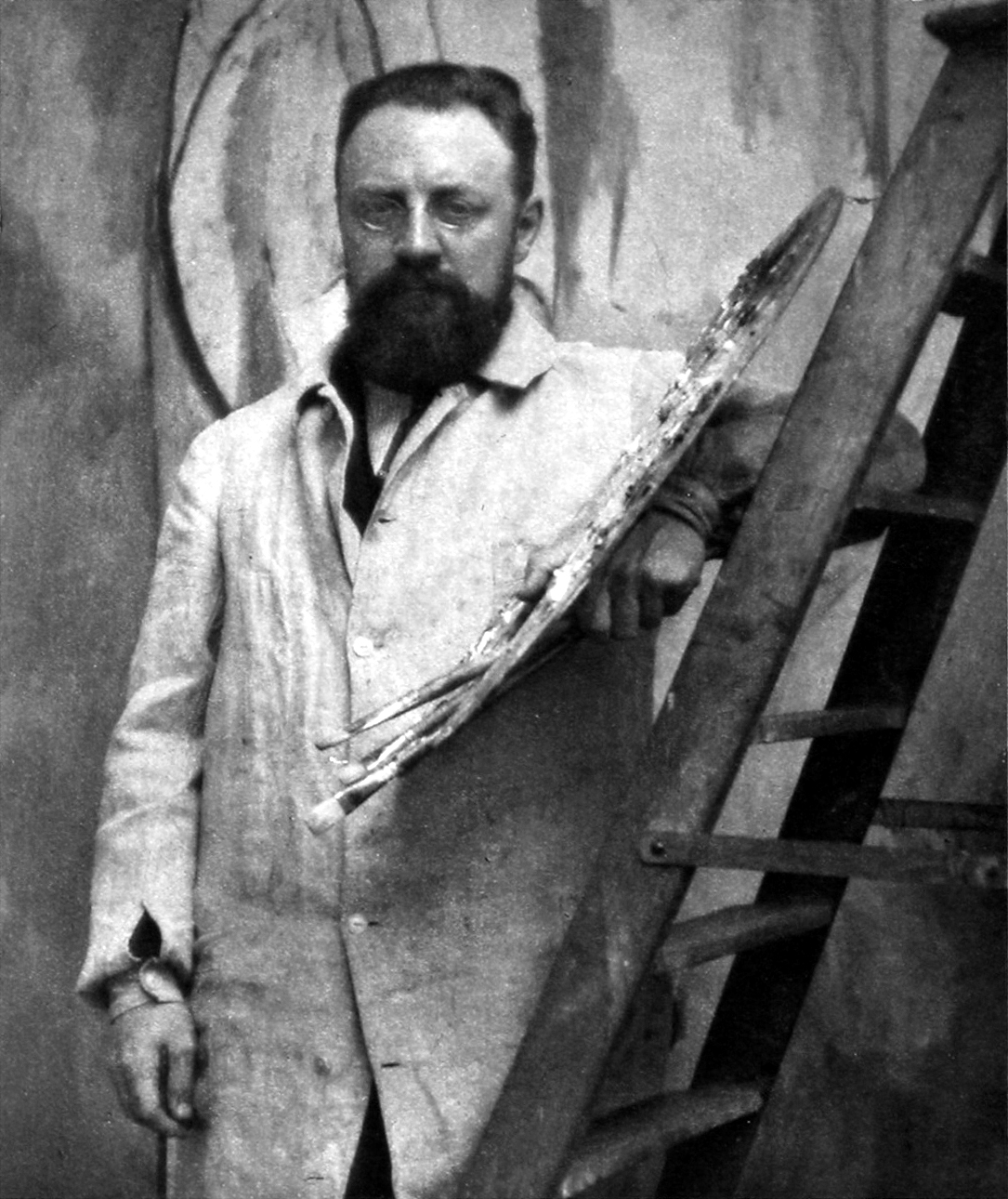
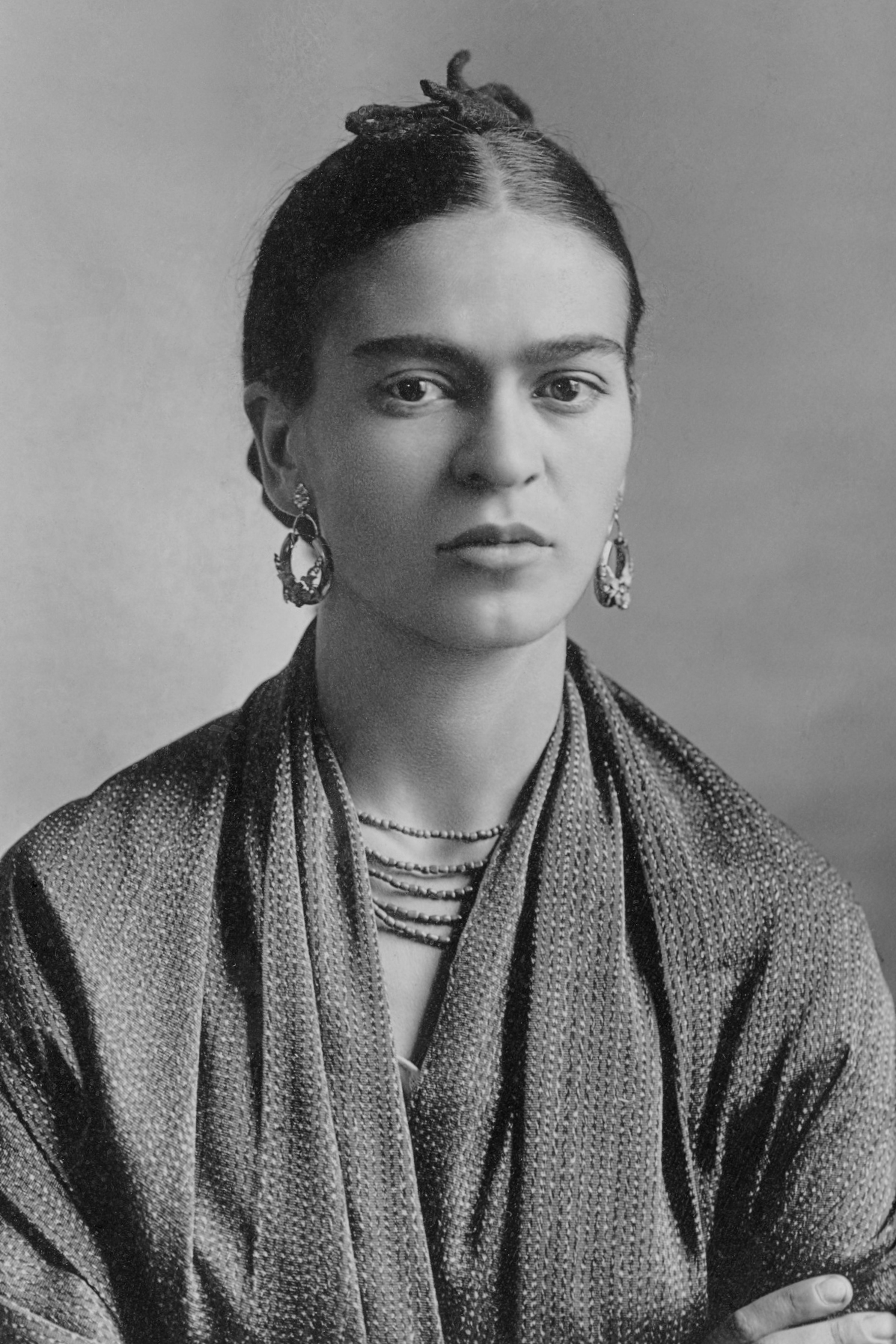
The art of Henri Matisse (left) and Frida Kahlo (right) entered the public domain in Europe in 2025; however, at this time, Kahlo's works remained copyrighted in her native Mexico.

Except for Belarus (Life + 50 years) and Spain (which has a copyright term of Life + 80 years for creators that died before 1988), a work enters the public domain in Europe 70 years after the creator's death, if it was published during the creator's lifetime. The same term applies in much of South America, and parts of western Africa. As such, the works of all authors who died in 1954 entered the European public domain in 2025.

Two of the most important authors whose works entered the European public domain in 2025 were Henri Matisse, one of the most revolutionary artists of the early 20th century and a key figure in multiple art movements; and Frida Kahlo, arguably the most recognized Mexican painter. At this time, the latter's works remained copyrighted in her native country. Other significant examples of authors whose works entered the public domain included actor and film director Lionel Barrymore (already partially public domain in his native United States), architects Auguste Perret and William Van Alen (the respective designers of the Théâtre des Champs-Élysées in Paris and the Chrysler Building in New York City), cartoonists Bud Fisher and George McManus, Italian composers Franco Alfano and Achille Longo, German composers Walter Braunfels and Herms Niel, Austrian composer Fred Raymond, American composers Charles Ives and Arthur Johnston (the latter of whom wrote "Cocktails for Two"), Man with a Movie Camera director Dziga Vertov, founding father of Chinese cinema Zhang Shichuan (already public domain in his native China), French painters André Derain and Jacques Gachot, Portuguese sculptor Maximiano Alves, gospel blues musician Washington Phillips, Lost Horizon author James Hilton, British novelist Francis Brett Young, Gigi author Colette, German author of the Dr. Mabuse novels Norbert Jacques, German writer and filmmaker Thea von Harbou, Italian writer Enrico Cavacchioli, American novelist Maxwell Bodenheim, and Australian writer Miles Franklin. Spanish writer Jacinto Benavente's works also entered the public domain in European countries other than his native Spain. The publications of mathematicians Gino Loria and Alan Turing and physicist Enrico Fermi also entered the public domain, along with an experimental film by the inventor of the cinematograph, Auguste Lumière.

In Argentina, the plays, screenplays and tango lyrics by Manuel Romero entered the public domain; he died on October 3, 1954, so under Argentine law, his individual works entered the public domain on January 1, 2025 (70 years from January 1 of the year following the death). However, this does not mean that his films are in the public domain, since Argentine law stipulates that copyright protection for a film lasts 50 years from the death of the screenwriter, producer or director.

== Countries with life + 80 years ==
Spain has a copyright term of life + 80 years for creators that died before 1987. In Colombia and Equatorial Guinea, a work enters the public domain 80 years after the creator's death.

Names	Country	Death	Occupation	Notable work
Joaquín Álvarez Quintero	Spain	14 June 1944	Playwright	
Miguel Asín Palacios	Spain	12 August 1944	Scholar	El Islam cristianizado
Manuel Chaves Nogales	Spain	8 May 1944	Writer, journalist	Juan Belmonte, matador de toros; su vida y sus hazañas
Enrique Díez Canedo	Spain	6 June 1944	Poet	
Francisco Gómez-Jordana Sousa	Spain	3 August 1944	Politician	Milicia y Diplomacia: Diarios Del Conde de Jordana, 1936–1944
Elías Mauricio Soto Uribe	Colombia	11 October 1944	Instrumentalist	
Antonio Videgain	Spain	9 February 1944	Composer	

== Russia ==
Russia has a copyright term of life + 70 years in general, with two special provisions:

- extra 4 years for those who fought in or worked during the so-called Great Patriotic War in 1941–1945, and/or
- copyright term starting from the date of rehabilitation for unlawfully prosecuted and posthumously rehabilitated.

1954 marks the first large wave of posthumous rehabilitations.

Names	Country	Death	Occupation	Notable work
Pavel Bazhov	Soviet Union	3 December 1950	Writer	The Malachite Box
Yustin Djanelidze	Soviet Union	14 January 1950	Doctor	A case of the repair of an injury of the ascending aorta
Sigizmund Krzhizhanovsky	Soviet Union	28 December 1950	Writer	The New Gulliver
Andrey Kryachkov	Soviet Union	25 August 1950	Architect	100-Flat Building
Nikolai Luzin	Soviet Union	28 February 1950	Mathematician	Lusin's theorem
Nikolai Myaskovsky	Soviet Union	8 August 1950	Composer	List of compositions by Nikolai Myaskovsky
Antonina Nezhdanova	Soviet Union	26 June 1950	Singer	Vocalise
Vladimir Sorin	Soviet Union	October 1944	Historian	Lenin in the Brest days
Viktor Vesnin	Soviet Union	17 September 1950	Architect	Palace of Culture of the Proletarsky district, Moscow

== Australia and Canada ==
In 2004 copyright in Australia changed from a "plus 50" law to a "plus 70" law, in line with the United States and the European Union. But the change was not made retroactive (unlike the 1995 change in the European Union which brought some (British and possibly other) authors back into copyright, especially those who died from 1925 to 1944). Hence, the work of an author who died before 1955 is normally in the public domain in Australia; but the copyright of authors was extended to 70 years after death for those who died in 1955 or later, and no more Australian authors would come out of copyright until 1 January 2026 (those who died in 1955).

Similarly, Canada amended its Copyright Act in 2022 from a "plus 50" law to a "plus 70" law, coming into force on December 30, 2022, but does not revive expired copyright. No more new Canadian authors will come out of copyright until 1 January 2043 (those who died in 1972). Crown copyright was not changed, thus any government works published in 1974 entered the public domain in 2025.

== United States ==
An overview of media that entered the public domain in the United States in 2025

The original version of Tintin (seen here with his dog Snowy) was among the characters who entered the public domain in the United States in 2025.

Under the Copyright Term Extension Act, books and other works published in 1929 and films released in 1929 entered the public domain in 2025. Unpublished works whose authors died in 1954 also entered the public domain. The character Captain Easy, Popeye the Sailor Man, (Note: Of those Thimble Theatre strips from 1929 that Popeye appears in, only his debut strip as well as the January 11, 1930 strip (which was the first full debut of The Sea Hag) had its copyright renewed properly by King Features Syndicate. Also, the entire run of Thimble Theatre between Popeye's introduction and May 4, 1933 (when King Features Weekly was started, and from which point strips from the syndicate began to be renewed) failed to have its copyrights properly renewed, with the exceptions of only those two strips. As a result, all characters introduced in this timespan, such as Bluto and J. Wellington Wimpy, entered the public domain ahead of Popeye; and when Popeye entered the public domain, the element of him using spinach to gain his strength entered with him as it also was not renewed.) Disney's Horace Horsecollar, and Hergé's Tintin entered the public domain through their respective debut appearances in 2025. (Note: Tintin was not published in the United States until 1959; therefore, the American localization of his character will remain under copyright until 2055. Furthermore, the U.S. public domain entry of Tintin only featured him and his dog Snowy; the rest of his major cast will not enter the public domain until later, when the stories that introduced them enter: for example, Tintin's most prominent supporting character, Captain Haddock, enters the public domain in 2037, through the story The Crab with the Golden Claws.) The same happened for the first Tarzan strips illustrated by Hal Foster. On the other hand, the character Buck Rogers (who also first appeared in U.S. newspapers the same year) was already in the public domain as his first strips failed to have their copyrights renewed, despite claims to the contrary. The Looney Tunes series' first star character, Bosko, was also already in the public domain without proper renewal.

Two notable music compositions that entered the public domain in 2025 are George Gershwin's An American in Paris and Maurice Ravel's Boléro; though composed in 1928, they were not published until 1929. Among the popular songs that entered the public domain that year are Fats Waller's song "Ain't Misbehavin'", Cole Porter's song "What Is This Thing Called Love?", the musical number "Singin' in the Rain", "Tip Toe Through the Tulips", "Happy Days Are Here Again", "Am I Blue?", "You Were Meant For Me", "Honeysuckle Rose" (also written by Waller), "Can't We Be Friends?", and "Without A Song". Sound recordings that were published in 1924 also entered the public domain, including the first recordings of Gershwin's Rhapsody in Blue, Jelly Roll Morton's "King Porter Stomp", Irving Berlin's songs "Lazy" and "What'll I Do?", "It Had to Be You", "California, Here I Come", and "Somebody Loves Me".

The Broadway Melody, MGM's first musical film and the winner of the second Academy Award for Best Picture, entered the public domain in 2025.

Notable films that entered the public domain in 2025 include the following:

- The Cocoanuts, the first film of the Marx Brothers;
- The Broadway Melody, Metro-Goldwyn-Mayer's first musical film and the first sound film (and second overall film) to win the Academy Award for Best Picture;
- The Hollywood Revue, MGM's second musical film, starring Conrad Nagel and Jack Benny, which popularized "Singin' in the Rain";
- Walt Disney's first Silly Symphony cartoons, including The Skeleton Dance;
- Blackmail, Alfred Hitchcock's first sound film and the first British sound film;
- Hallelujah, one of the first films with an all-African American cast produced by a major studio;
- The Wild Party, Clara Bow's first sound film;
- Welcome Danger, Harold Lloyd's first sound film;
- On with the Show!, the first sound film in color;
- Pandora’s Box (Die Büchse der Pandora), directed by G. W. Pabst and starring Louise Brooks;
- Show Boat, adapted from and featuring some songs of the 1927 musical;
- The Black Watch, John Ford's first sound film;
- Spite Marriage, Buster Keaton's final full-length feature as a director;
- Say It with Songs, the first all-talking film starring Al Jolson;
- Dynamite, Cecil B. DeMille's first sound film;
- Gold Diggers of Broadway, directed by Roy del Ruth, the second sound film in color;
- Mickey Mouse's cartoons released in 1929, including The Karnival Kid (his first speaking appearance);
- the sound versions of Mickey's earlier cartoons Plane Crazy and The Gallopin' Gaucho;
- Oswald the Lucky Rabbit's surviving cartoons from the Winkler studio and his first Walter Lantz-era releases;
- Small Talk, the first sound film in the Our Gang series;
- Eternal Love, John Barrymore's last silent film;
- The Virginian, Gary Cooper's and Victor Fleming's first sound film;
- The Return of Sherlock Holmes, the first sound film to star the titular detective;
- Bulldog Drummond, the first sound film to star the character of the same name;
- The Three Masks (Les trois masques), the first French sound film;
- Behind That Curtain, the first sound film to star the character Charlie Chan;
- Where East Is East, Lon Chaney's last collaboration with Tod Browning;
- Land Without Women (Das Land ohne Frauen), the first German sound film;
- The Desert Song, also directed by Roy del Ruth;
- Applause, the directorial debut of Rouben Mamoulian;
- Disraeli, starring George Arliss in the title role;
- Woman in the Moon (Frau im Mond), directed by Fritz Lang; and
- The Love Parade, Ernst Lubitsch's first sound film and the debut film for Jeanette MacDonald.

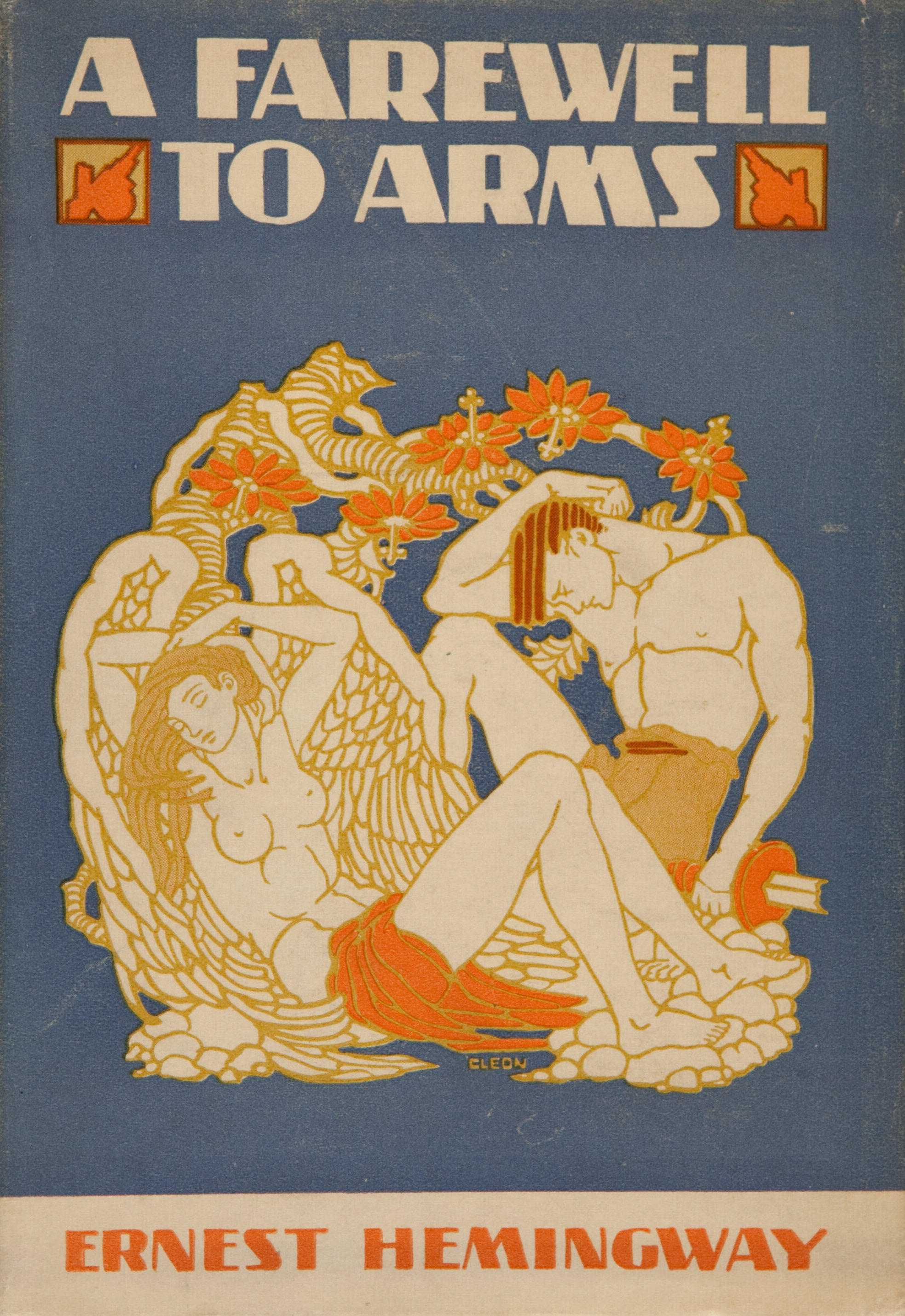
A Farewell to Arms by Ernest Hemingway

Significant literary works entering the public domain included Ernest Hemingway's novel A Farewell to Arms, Virginia Woolf's essay A Room of One's Own, William Faulkner's novel The Sound and the Fury, Oliver La Farge's novel Laughing Boy, Walter Lippmann's A Preface to Morals, James Thurber's Is Sex Necessary? Or, Why You Feel the Way You Do (co-written by E. B. White), Rainer Maria Rilke's Letters to a Young Poet in its original German, Robert Graves' autobiography Good-Bye to All That, Patrick Hamilton's play Rope, Richard Hughes' A High Wind in Jamaica, John Steinbeck's first novel Cup of Gold, Dashiell Hammett's novel Red Harvest and the original serialized version of his Maltese Falcon, the first English translation of Erich Maria Remarque's All Quiet on the Western Front, Agatha Christie's crime novel The Seven Dials Mystery, The Roman Hat Mystery by Ellery Queen, Alfred Döblin's novel Berlin Alexanderplatz in its original German, S. S. Van Dine's detective novel The Scarab Murder Case, Sinclair Lewis' novel Dodsworth, the children's book Hitty, Her First Hundred Years by Rachel Field, Thomas Wolfe's novel Look Homeward, Angel, DuBose Heyward's novel Mamba's Daughters, Jean Cocteau's novel Les Enfants Terribles in its original French, William Seabrook's novel The Magic Island (the first book to introduce the concept of a zombie), Margery Allingham's crime novel The Crime at Black Dudley, Ludwig Wittgenstein's essay Some Remarks on Logical Form, the first part of the 14th edition of Encyclopædia Britannica, and the original editions of the Hardy Boys novels The Secret of the Caves and The Mystery of Cabin Island.

Important examples of artworks that entered the public domain include Salvador Dalí's paintings Illumined Pleasures, The Great Masturbator, and The Accommodations of Desire. Publication records for other major paintings created in 1929 have yet to be located. The public domain status of René Magritte's The Treachery of Images is particularly contentious. M. C. Escher's print Strada di Scanno and the first design of the Barcelona chair also entered the public domain.

2025's wave of American public domain entrants attracted the interest of a number of notable media outlets, namely CBS Saturday Morning, NPR's Morning Edition, the Associated Press, the Los Angeles Times, Smithsonian Magazine, and Marketplace.

== India ==
On 1 January 2025, M. P. Parameswaran gave his formal consent to release a selection of his works under a free license, making them available to the public domain via Wikimedia Commons. A ceremony was held at his residence where the first batch of books marked for digitization to the Wikimedia community. The digitisation process was undertaken by the Sahya Digital Conservation Foundation, with representatives from the Kerala Sasthra Sahitya Parishad, the Wikimedians of Kerala User Group, and other volunteers in attendance.

== Worldwide ==
On February 25, 2025, it was announced that the 3D printing computer model 3DBenchy will enter the public domain through a CC0-license.

A 3D printable computer model of the sculpture Best Friends Forever in which Donald Trump and Jeffrey Epstein are holding hands is released into the public domain.

== See also ==
- List of American films of 1929
- 1954 in literature and 1974 in literature for deaths of writers
- Public Domain Day
- Creative Commons
