= Yustin =

Yustin is a masculine given name. Notable people with the name include:

- Yustin Djanelidze, Soviet surgeon
- Yustin Sirutis, American boxer
