= Camargo Municipality =

Camargo Municipality may refer to:

- Camargo Municipality, Chihuahua, Mexico
- Camargo Municipality, Tamaulipas, Mexico

== See also ==
- Camargo (disambiguation)
