= Mário Soares Garden =

Public park in Lisbon, Portugal

- Jardim Mário Soares; Jardim do Campo Grande
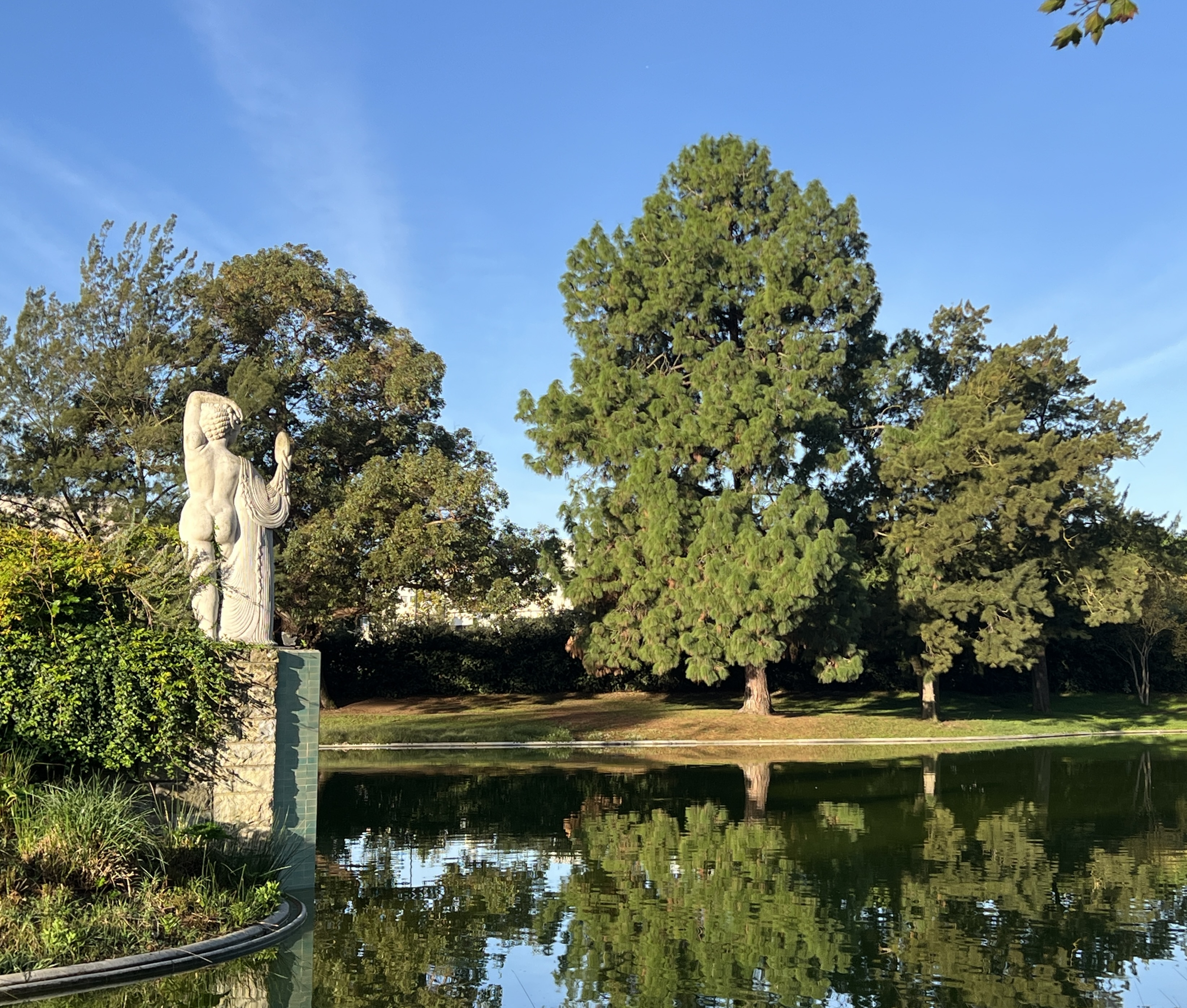
- Interactive map of Mário Soares Garden
- Type: Public park
- Location: Alvalade, Lisbon
- Coordinates: 38.753°N 9.151°W
- Area: 13.4 hectares (33 acres)
- Etymology: Mário Soares

The Mário Soares Garden (Jardim Mário Soares) is a 13.38-hectare public park in the municipality of Alvalade in the Portuguese capital Lisbon. It is long and narrow, with a maximum width of about 150 metres, and extends northwest for 1.2 kilometres between two carriageways of Campo Grande, beginning near the Campo Grande subway station. The park is divided into northern and southern sections by the Avenida do Brasil. Laid out in the 19th century and known at that time as the Jardim do Campo Grande, it was renamed in 2018 after former President of Portugal Mário Soares.

== History ==
The first reference to the area is in 1520, and until the 16th century the site was known as Campo de Alvalade. The first avenue defining the Campo Grande was laid out in 1642, and in 1778 an annual fair known as Feira do Campo Grande or Feira das Nuzes began. In 1801 Rodrigo de Sousa Coutinho, Count of Linhares, had the park redesigned and expanded in the Romantic style at the behest of the Portuguese Prince Regent, later King João VI. The existing well was replaced by a fountain in 1813, and in 1816 the first horse races took place on the site, now known as the Jardim do Campo Grande. In 1837 a public notice banned vehicles, livestock, and hunting.

Today the park is a public leisure and recreation area, one of the largest parks in downtown Lisbon. Between 2012 and 2018 through a collaboration between the Lisbon City Council and the University of Lisbon it was renovated and redesigned in several stages, as a cost of €1.5 million, to expand its green space and plant 700 more trees. In 2018 it was renamed after former President Mário Soares, who had died a year earlier. The renamed garden was inaugurated on 25 April 2018, the anniversary of the 1974 Carnation Revolution, by President Marcelo Rebelo de Sousa.

== Amenities ==
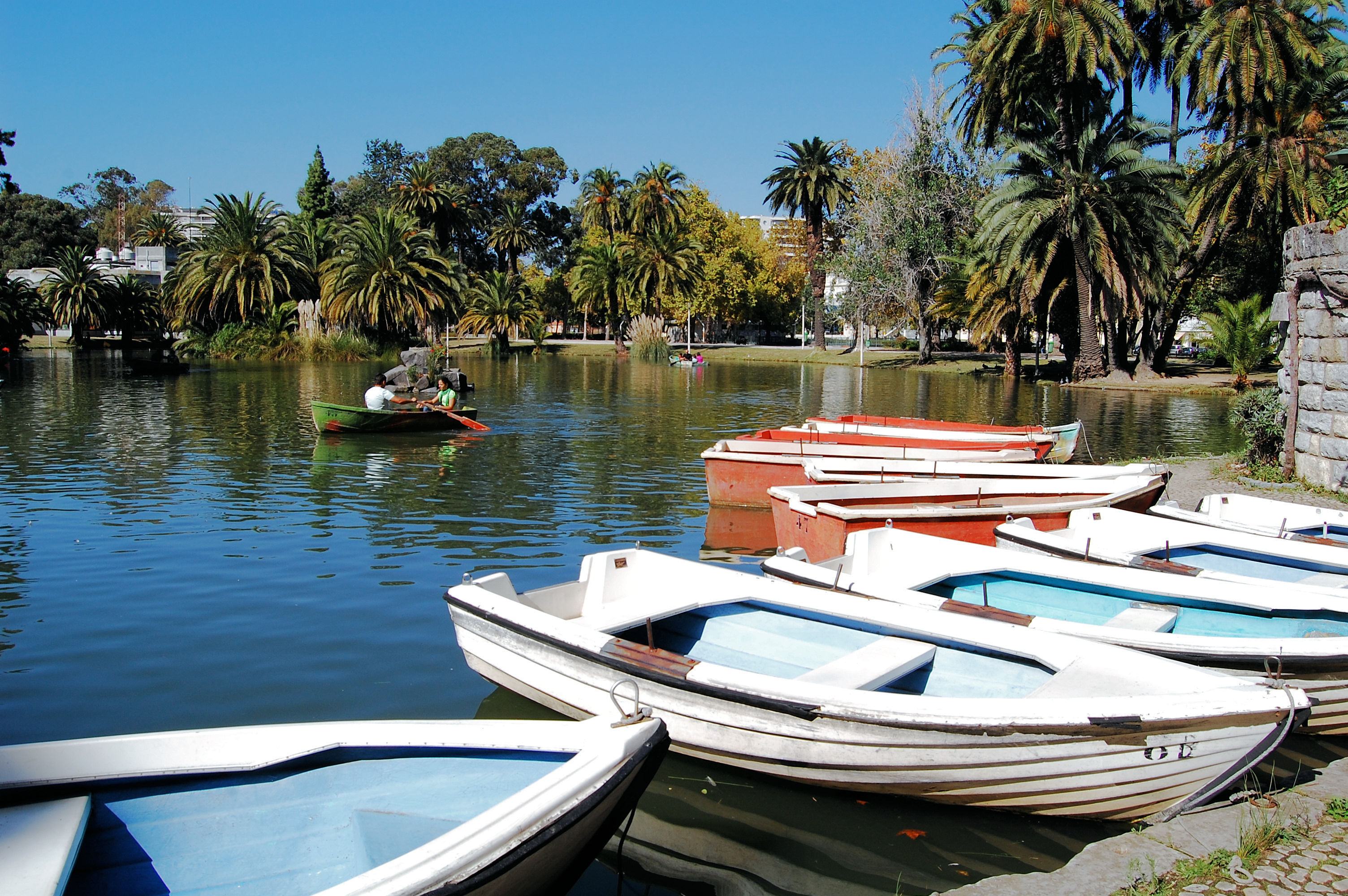
Boats in the lake

A playground was built in 1954 by the landscape architect Manuel Azevedo Coutinho. It has the first dedicated dog park in Lisbon, and an artificial lake with rowboats available for the public. There are several restaurants, including one on an island in the lake reached via a small stone bridge.There are also several tennis courts and a large fitness centre in the park.

== Art ==
The Jardim Mário Soares has numerous public artworks and statues. These include:

- A 1921 bronze bust of Rafael Bordalo Pinheiro on a stone plinth by sculptor Raul Xavier sits in front of the Bordalo Pinheiro Museum.
- Two sculpted foals (1946) at the entrance to the restaurant Casa do Lago, by António da Rocha Correia. Nearby is a stone version of the sculpture La Femme au Miroir (1949), by Canto da Maia.
- A small 1948 bronze statue of a boy with a begging bowl by Maximiano Alves.
- A bust of João da Câmara, by Maximiliano Alves, commissioned by Lisbon City Hall and unveiled on 20 June 1953. This was moved in the 1980s to the square named for him near Rossio.
- A 1957 bust of the opera singer Luísa Todi (1753–1833) by Martins Correia, on a stone plinth decorated with the muses. Originally intended for the Largo do Teatro São Carlos in Chiado, it was installed here on 9 January 1957, the singer's birthday.
- A bronze bust of the actor António Pedro (1836–1889) by Costa Motta, unveiled on 23 July 1959.
- Childhood (Portuguese: A Infância), a 1992 bronze sculpture by artist and cartoonist "Sam" (Samuel Torres de Carvalho, 1924–1993). It depicts a figure with huge breasts which are also a water feature, sending twin jets into the lake.
- Statues of Afonso Henriques and John I created by Leopoldo de Almeida between 1946 and 1950, originally placed in the atrium of the Lisbon City Hall until a fire in 1996; they were moved to this site on 31 August 1997.
- Speakers Corner, a memorial to Mário Soares by Henrique Cayatte dedicated on 25 April 2018.
  Public art in Mário Soares Garden
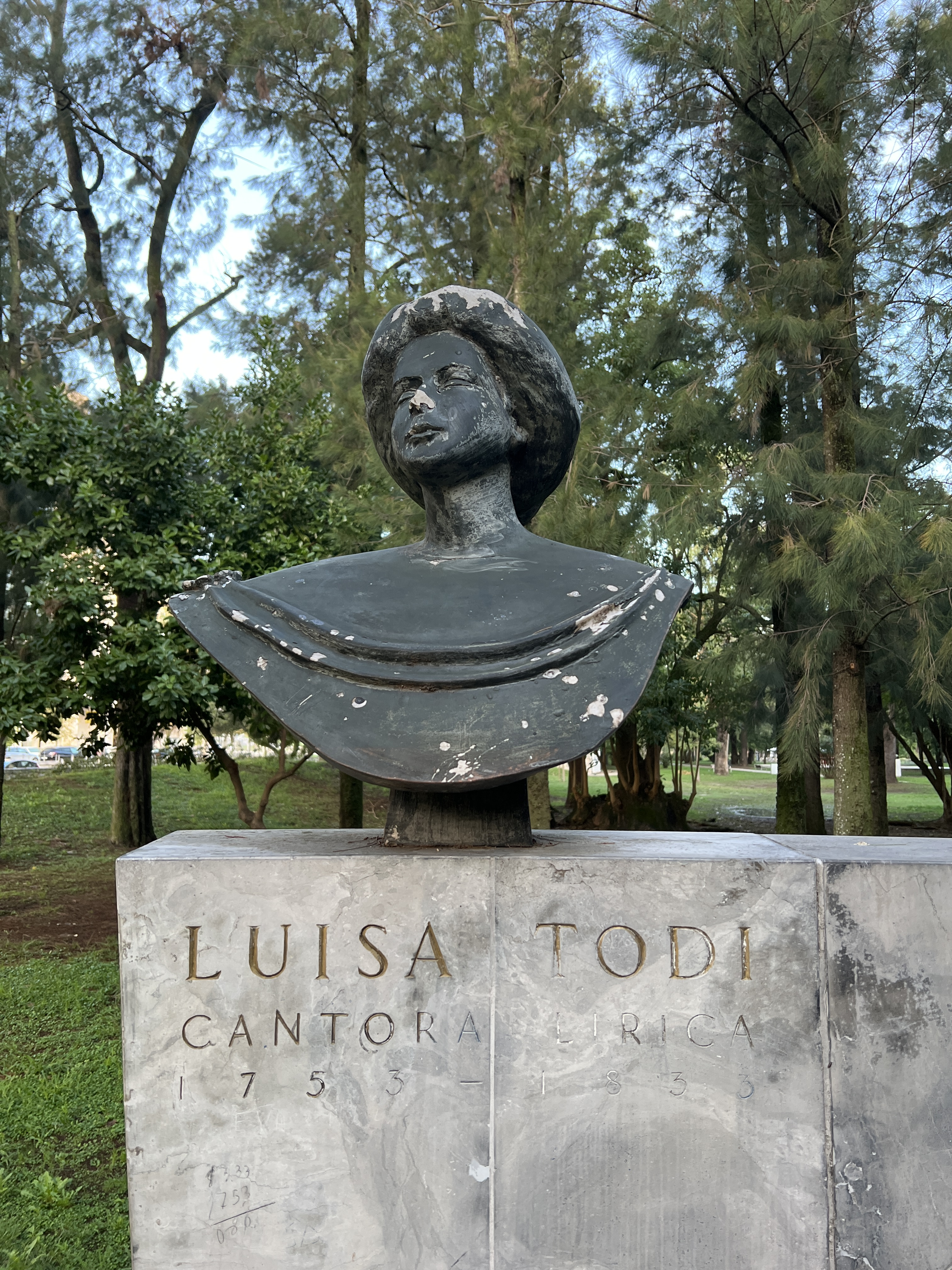
  Bust of Luísa Todi by Martins Correia
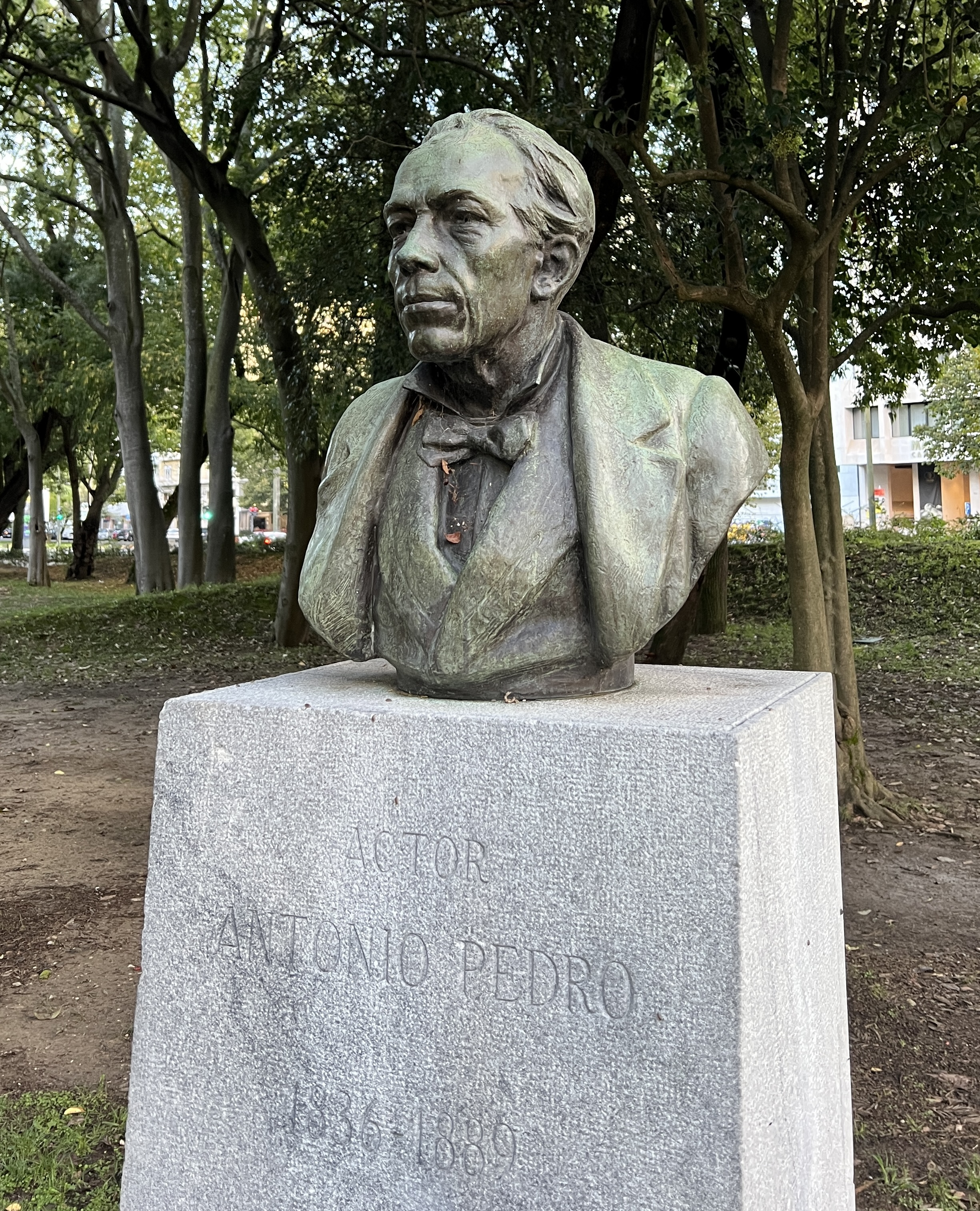
  Bust of António Pedro by Costa Motta
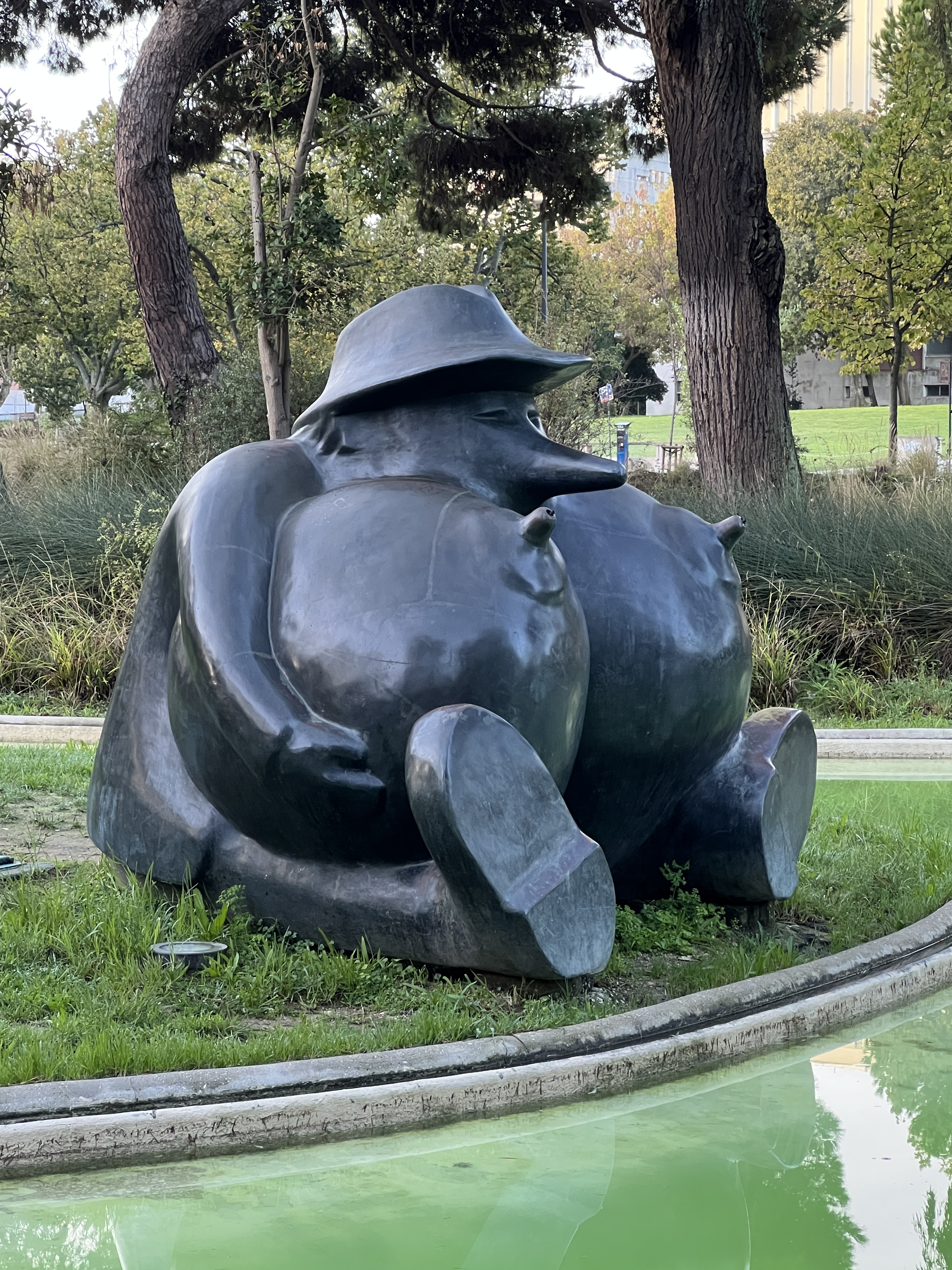
  A Infância by Sam
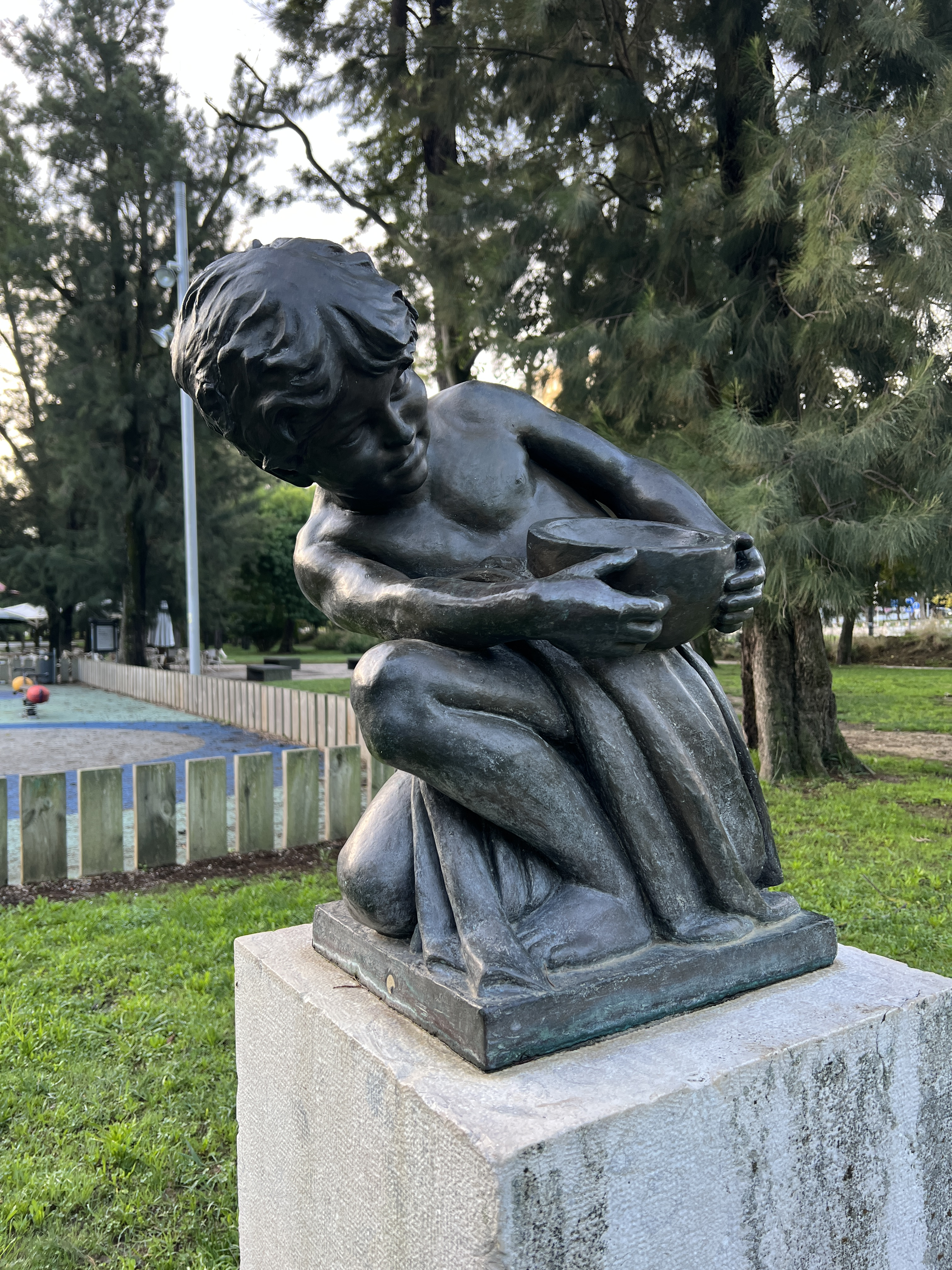
  Statue by Maximiano Alves
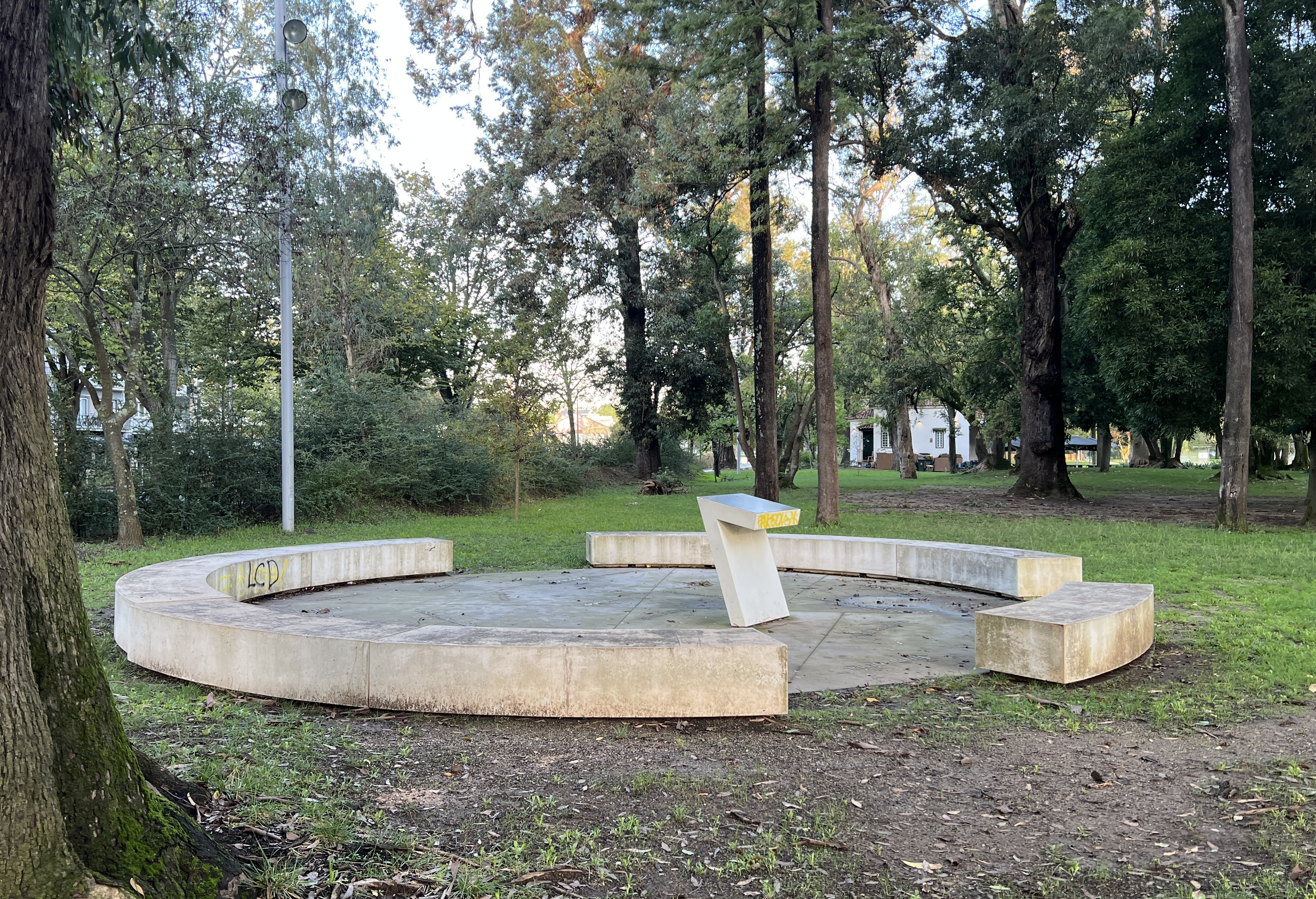
  Speakers Corner
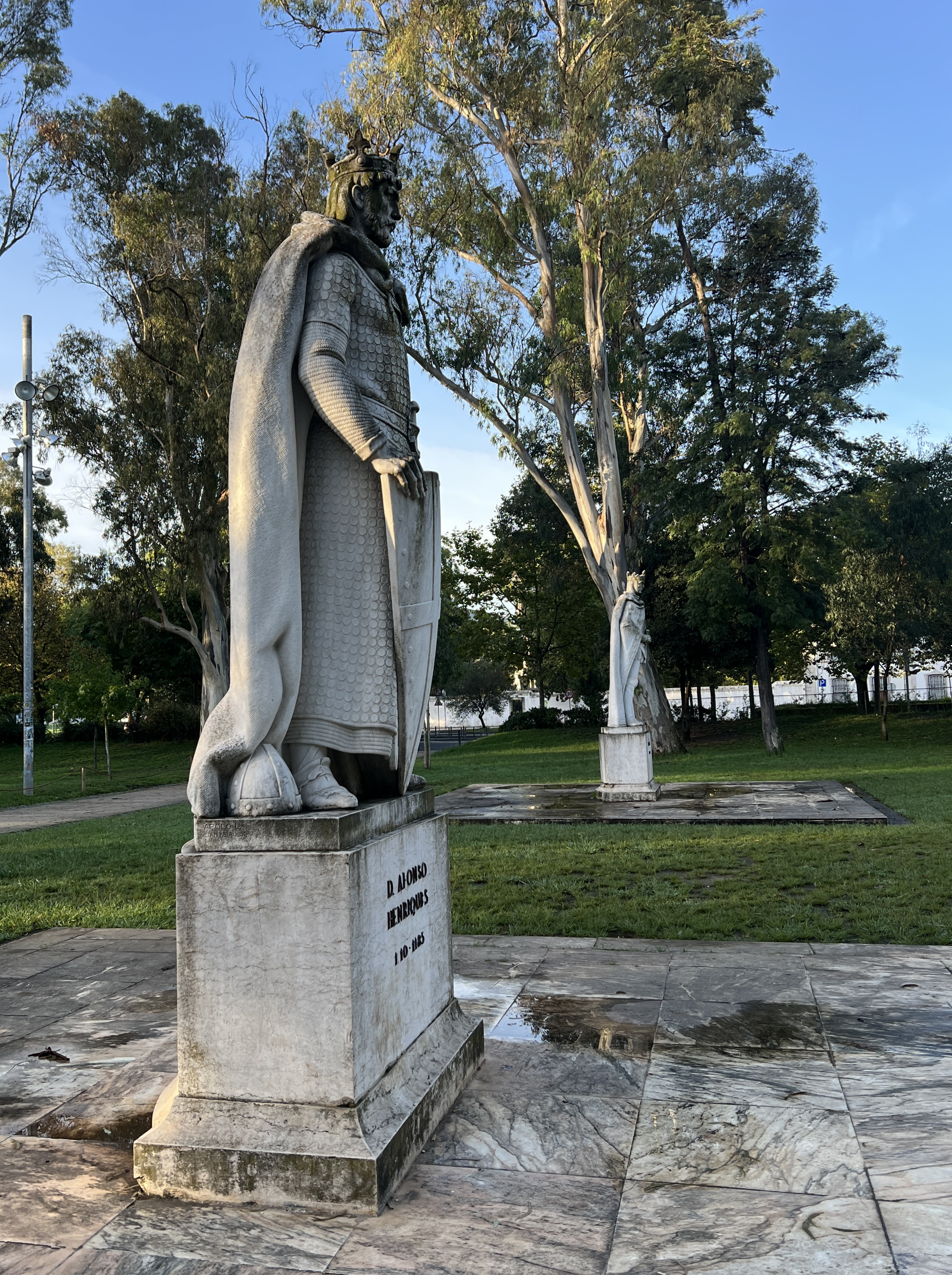
  John I by Leopoldo de Almeida
