= Camargo =

Camargo may refer to:

== Places ==
=== Bolivia ===
- Camargo, Chuquisaca

=== Brazil ===
- Camargo, Rio Grande do Sul
- The Iberê Camargo Foundation in Porto Alegre, Brazil.

=== France ===
- The Camargo Foundation in Cassis, France

=== Mexico ===
- Camargo Municipality, Chihuahua
  - Camargo, Chihuahua, the municipal seat
- Camargo Municipality, Tamaulipas
- Camargo volcanic field, a volcanic field in north-central Mexico

=== Spain ===
- Camargo, Spain

=== United States ===
- Camargo, Illinois
- Camargo, Kentucky
- Camargo, Mississippi
- Camargo, Oklahoma

== People ==
=== Surname ===
- Alondra Camargo (born 1995), Mexican footballer
- Alonso de Camargo (1500–1546), Spanish naval officer and navigator
- Ángel Camargo (born 1967), Colombian road cyclist
- Christian Camargo (born 1971), American actor
- Daniel Camargo (born 1991), Brazilian ballet dancer
- Daniel Camargo Barbosa (1930–1994) prolific Colombian serial killer and rapist
- Diego Muñoz Camargo (c. 1529–1599), Mexican historian
- Fernando Camargo (born 1977), Colombian road cyclist
- Francisco Cristancho Camargo (1905–1977), Colombian composer and musician
- Hebe Camargo (1929–2012), Brazilian television presenter
- Hélio Ferraz de Almeida Camargo (1922–2006), Brazilian zoologist and lawyer
- Iberê Camargo, (1914–1994), Brazilian painter
- Joel Camargo (1946–2014), Brazilian professional footballer
- Johan Camargo (born 1993), Panamanian baseball player
- Jorge Camargo Spolidore (1912–1974), Colombian composer and musician
- Luiz Camargo (born 1987), Brazilian footballer
- María Constanza Camargo, Colombian cancer epidemiologist
- Marie-Anne de Cupis de Camargo (1710–1770), French/Belgian dancer
- Marina Camargo, Brazilian artist
- Martina Camargo (born 1960), Colombian singer and songwriter
- Rodrigo Camargo (born 1981), Brazilian politician
- Sergio Camargo (born 1994), Canadian soccer player
- Sérgio de Camargo (1930–1990), Brazilian sculptor
- Wanessa Camargo (born 1982), Brazilian singer-songwriter

=== Given name ===
- Camargo Guarnieri (1907–1993), Brazilian composer

== Other uses ==
- Camargo (ballet), an 1872 ballet choreographed by Marius Petipa and composed by Ludwig Minkus
- La Camargo (opera) (1878), by Charles Lecocq
- La Camargo, an 1897 unpublished opera by Wolf-Ferrari
- La Camargo (1912), a ballet choreographed by Adeline Genée and composed by Dora Bright
- Camargo (yacht), a 1928 yacht owned by Julius Fleischmann, Jr.
