= Bust of António Pedro =

Statue in Lisbon, Portugal

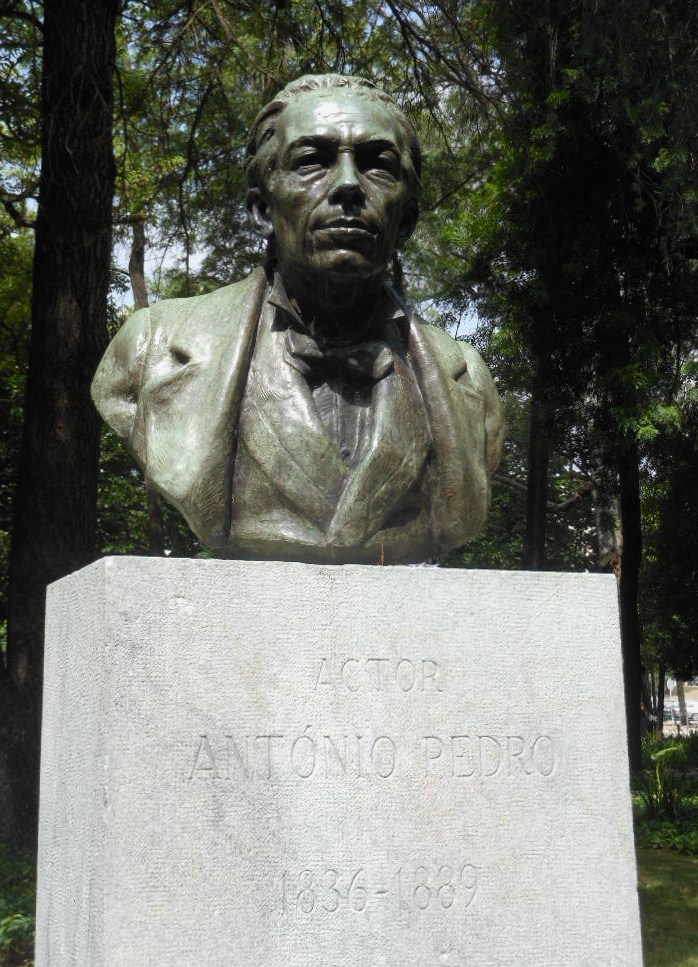
- The sculpture in 2011.
- Interactive map of Bust of António Pedro
- Location: Mário Soares Garden, Alvalade, Lisbon, Portugal
- Coordinates: 38°45′02.27″N 09°08′58.31″W
- Designer: Costa Motta
- Type: Statue
- Material: Bronze
- Opening date: 23 July 1959
- Dedicated to: António Pedro

The bust of António Pedro (Portuguese pronunciation: [ɐ̃ˈtɔ.ni.u ˈpe.dɾu]; Portuguese: busto de António Pedro) is a bronze sculpture in the city of Lisbon, Portugal, placed in the Mário Soares Garden. It is located within the neighbourhood of Campo Grande in the civil parish of Alvalade. It is dedicated to António Pedro (1836–1889), one of the most acclaimed Portuguese actors of the 19th century. The sculpture was designed by Costa Motta, and unveiled on 23 July 1959.

== History ==
The sculpture was proposed by the Lisbon City Council, designed by Costa Motta, and unveiled on 23 July 1959. It was dedicated to António Pedro (1836–1889), one of the most acclaimed Portuguese actors of the 19th century.

== Design ==
The monument consists of a bronze bust of António Pedro wearing a suit, placed on top of a stone pedestal. It features an inscription which reads: "Actor António Pedro; 1836–1889". It is located in the southern part of the Mário Soares Garden.
