= Statues of Afonso Henriques and John I =

Two stone statues in Lisbon, Portugal

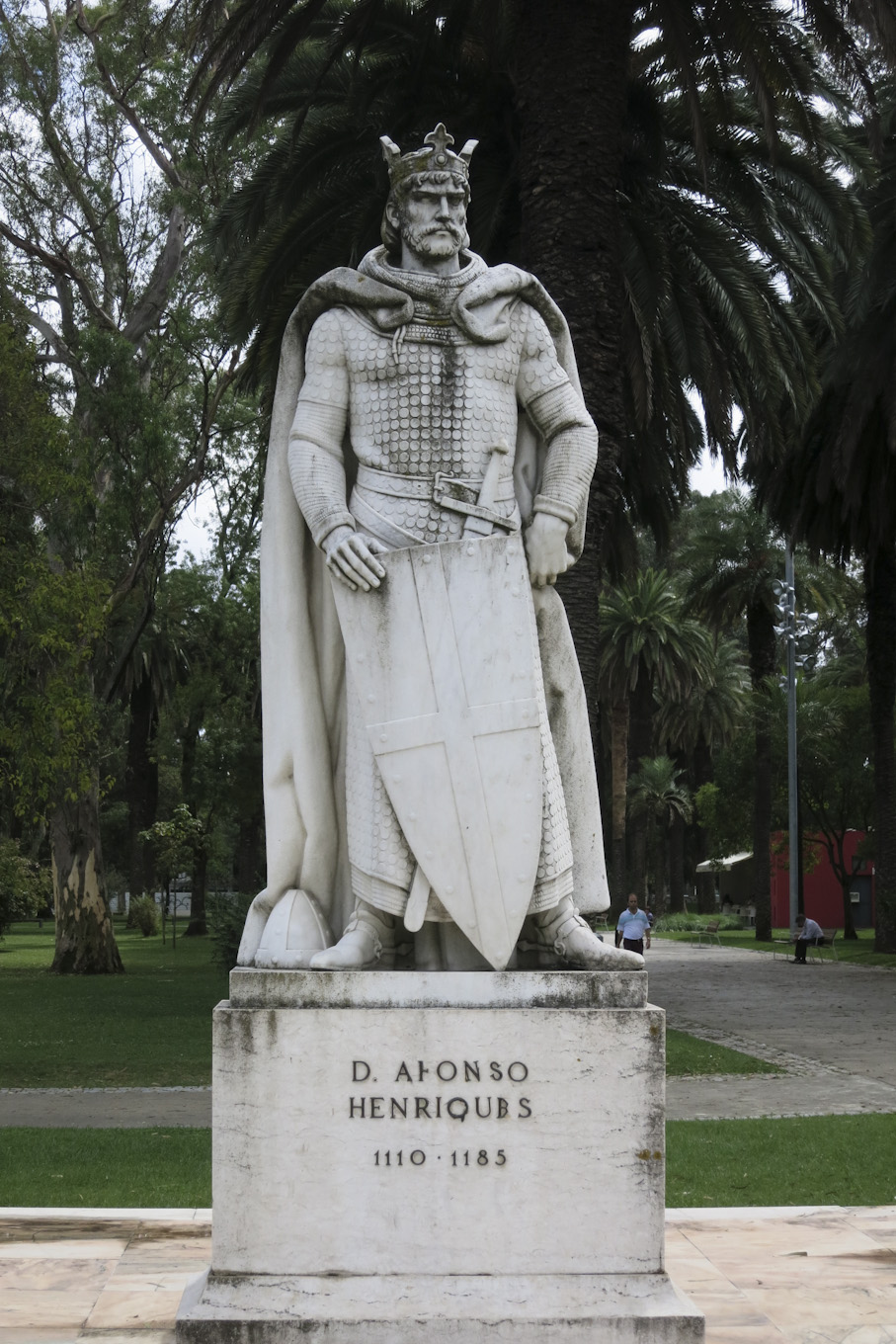
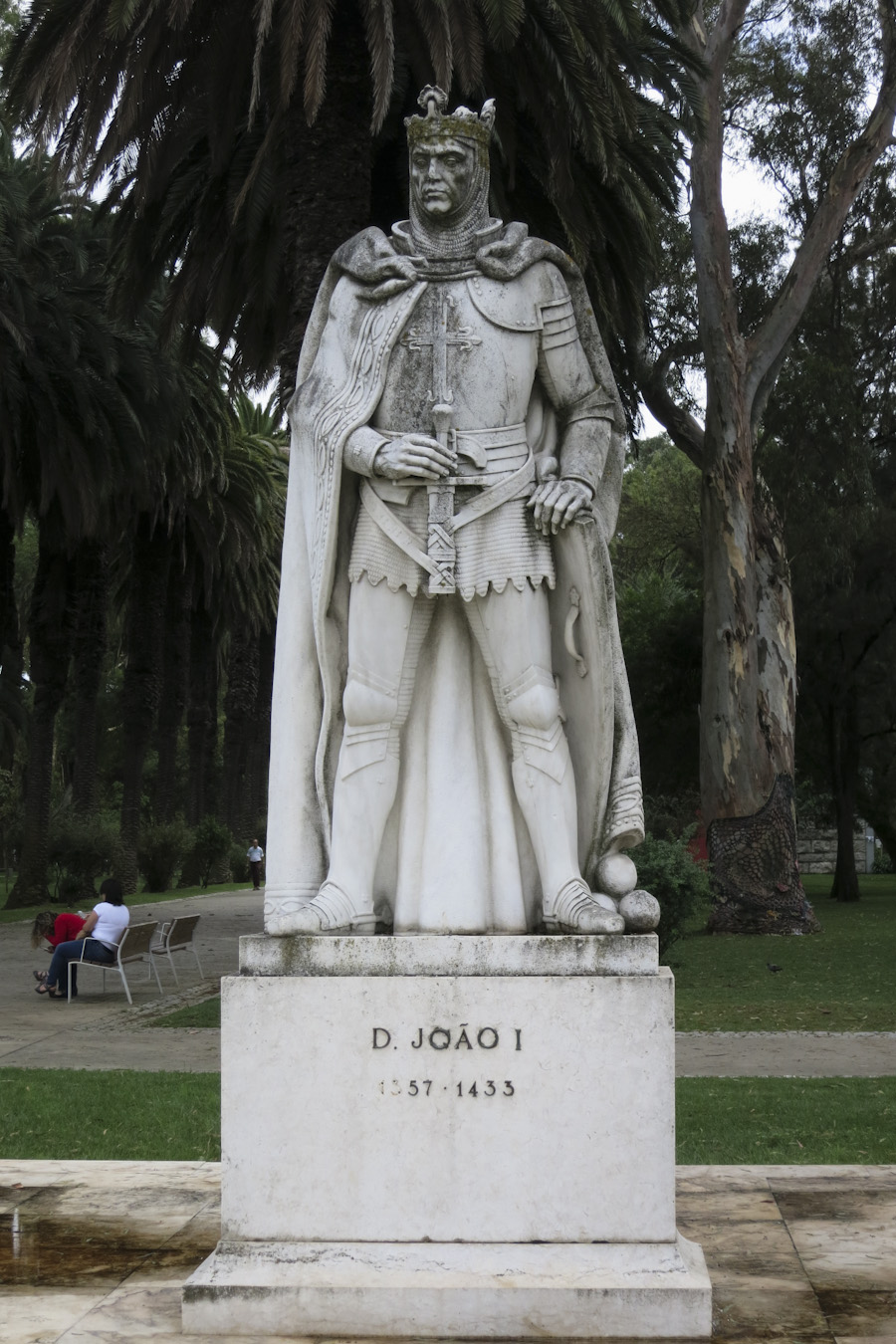
- Statues of Afonso Henriques (left) and John I (right) in 2014.
- Interactive map of Statues of Afonso Henriques and John I
- Location: Mário Soares Garden, Alvalade, Lisbon, Portugal
- Coordinates: 38°45′32.32″N 09°09′19.27″W
- Designer: Leopoldo de Almeida
- Type: Statue
- Material: Stone
- Height: 2.8 m (9 ft 2 in)
- Beginning date: 1946
- Completion date: 1950
- Dedicated to: Afonso Henriques; John I

Statues of Afonso Henriques and John I (Portuguese: Estátuas de D. Afonso Henriques e D. João I) are two stone sculptures in Lisbon, Portugal, located in the Mário Soares Garden, within the civil parish of Alvalade. They were made by Leopoldo de Almeida between 1946 and 1950, and dedicated to Afonso Henriques, the first King of Portugal that ruled from 1139 to 1185, and John I, the King of Portugal from to 1385 to 1433, and a founder of the House of Aviz. They were originally placed in the atrium of the Lisbon City Hall, and relocated to their current location in 1997.

== History ==
The two stone statues were made by sculptor Leopoldo de Almeida between 1946 and 1950, and dedicated to Afonso Henriques, first King of Portugal that ruled from 1139 to 1185, and John I, King of Portugal from to 1385 to 1433, and founder of the House of Aviz. They were originally placed in the atrium of the Lisbon City Hall. Following the building fire from 7 November 1996, they were relocated to their current location in Mário Soares Garden on 31 August 1997. They replaced previously standing there statue of Óscar Carmona, also made by de Almeida, which was then moved to the Museum of Lisbon.

== Characteristics ==
The two statues are made from white stone, and standing on a rectangular bases. Each have the height of 2.80 m. They are placed next to each other at the north end of Mário Soares Garden, facing north. They depict Afonso Henriques, the first King of Portugal which ruled from 1139 to 1185, and John I, the King of Portugal from to 1385 to 1433, and a founder of the House of Aviz. Both of them are wearing plate armour, robes, crowns, and capes. Additionally Afonso Henriques rest his hands on a shield in front of him, placed vertically on the ground, and has a sword attached to his belt, while John I, rests his right hand on a his sword hilt.
