= Strada di Scanno =

Lithographic print by M. C. Escher

- Artist: Maurits Cornelis Escher
- Year: 1929
- Location: National Gallery of Canada, Ottawa

Strada di Scanno is a lithographic print by Maurits Cornelis Escher made in 1929.

== Description ==
The lithograph depicts a street in Scanno (Vico Ciorla), it represents this village alley with a descending staircase in which there are two female figures doing work on the bobbin lace. In the distance there is a mountain and trees.

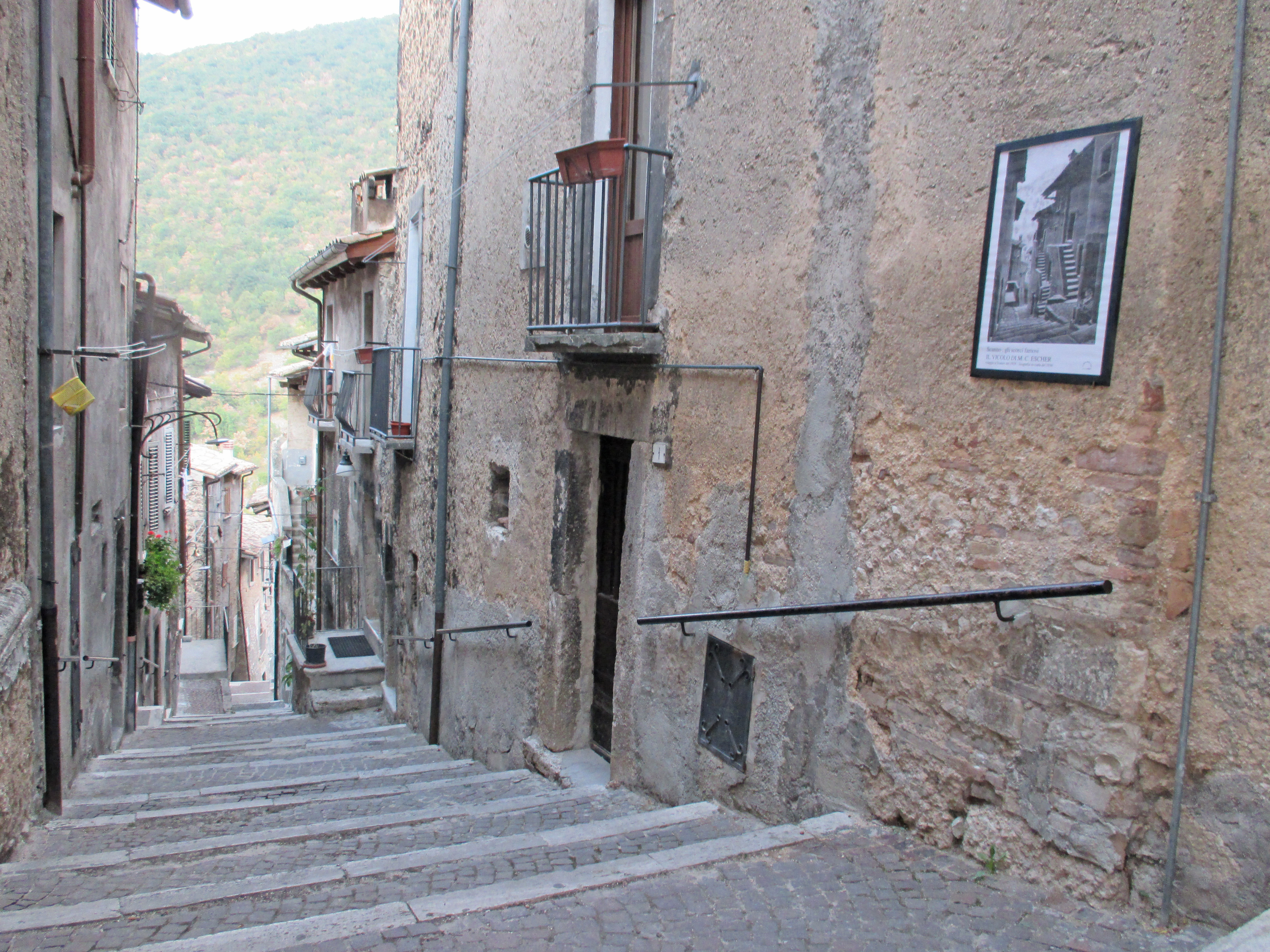
Detail of the Scanno alley where Escher created the lithograph, with a reproduction of the lithograph mounted on the wall.
