= María Constanza Camargo =

Colombian cancer epidemiologist

María Constanza Camargo Bohórquez is a Colombian cancer epidemiologist who researches the Epstein–Barr virus and gastric carcinogenesis. She is an investigator in the metabolic epidemiology branch at the National Cancer Institute.

== Life ==
Camargo was born to Aracely and Efrain. She completed a B.Sc. in bacteriology from the Universidad Colegio Mayor de Cundinamarca in 1992. She completed a M.H.A degree from the Pontifical Xavierian University in 1997. In 2002, Camargo earned an M.Sc. in epidemiology from the Instituto Nacional de Salud Pública. She was a member of the research group led by Pelayo Correa, first at Louisiana State University and then at Vanderbilt University, studying gastric cancer and its primary risk factor, Helicobacter pylori infection. In 2010, Camargo received a Ph.D. in public health with a concentration in epidemiology from the University of Illinois Chicago. Her dissertation was titled The role of EBV in gastric carcinogenesis epidemiologic modeling and molecular investigations. Garth Rauscher was her doctoral advisor. She conducted her dissertation work at the National Cancer Institute (NCI) infections and immunoepidemiology branch (IIB) on the role of Epstein–Barr virus infection in gastric carcinogenesis. She joined IIB as a postdoctoral fellow in 2010 and became an Earl Stadtman Tenure-Track Investigator in the metabolic epidemiology branch (MEB) in 2016.
