= Yustin Sirutis =

American boxer

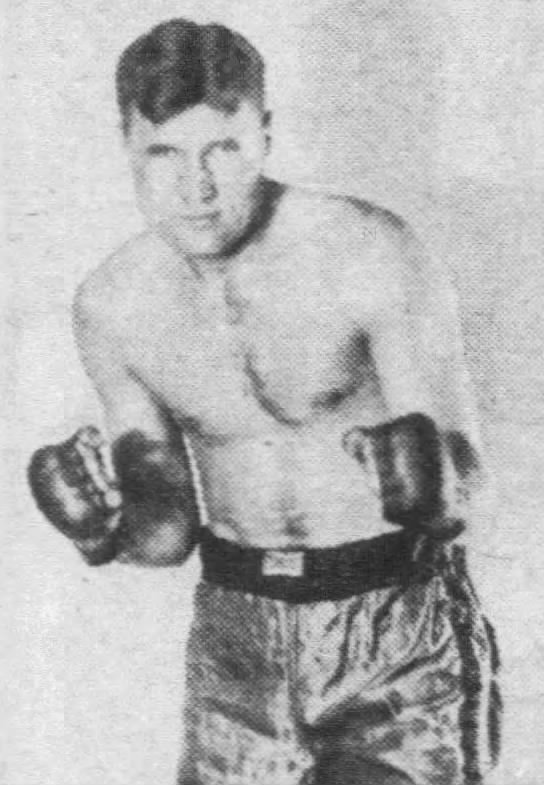
- Sirutis in 1931

Personal information
- Nationality: American
- Died: January 6, 1988 (aged 79)
- Weight: Heavyweight

Boxing career

Boxing record
- Total fights: 35
- Wins: 22
- Win by KO: 9
- Losses: 11
- Draws: 1
- No contests: 1

Yustin Sirutis (died January 6, 1988) was an American boxer.

== Life and career ==
Sirutis graduated from New York University in 1932. He was a Golden Gloves champion.

In 1934, Sirutis was appointed as a boxing coach at City College of New York. He retired as a boxing coach in 1968. After retiring, he was a professor and chairman of the physical education department at Baruch College.

Sirutis died on January 6, 1988, at the age of 79.

== Professional boxing record ==
35 fights	22 wins	11 losses
By knockout	9	0
By decision	13	11
Draws	1	
No contests	1	

No.	Result	Record	Opponent	Type	Rounds	Date	Location	Notes
35	Loss	14–2–1	Otis Thomas	PTS	10	October 8, 1938	Rockland Palace, New York, U.S.	
34	Loss	94–15–10	Tiger Jack Fox	PTS	10	September 8, 1938	Idora Park, Youngstown, U.S.	
33	Loss	92–15–10	Tiger Jack Fox	PTS	8	June 9, 1938	Nutley Velodrome, Nutley, U.S.	
32	Loss	45–6–2	Jack Trammell	PTS	10	April 2, 1938	Rockland Palace, New York, U.S.	
31	Loss	9–9–2	Jim Howell	PTS		February 12, 1938	Rockland Palace, New York, U.S.	
30	Win	8–2–0	Oscar Matthews	TKO	3	January 22, 1938	Rockland Palace, New York, U.S.	
29	Draw	82–14–7	Tiger Jack Fox	PTS		October 2, 1937	Rockland Palace, New York, U.S.	
28	No contest	18–3–1	Eddie Blunt	NC	8 (3)	August 5, 1937	Madison Square Garden, New York, U.S.	
27	Win	18–4–2	Frank Connolly	MD		June 7, 1937	Valley Arena, Holyoke, U.S.	
26	Win	54–38–6	Unknown Winston	UD	10	April 26, 1937	Valley Arena, Holyoke, U.S.	
25	Win	54–37–6	Unknown Winston	SD	10	March 22, 1937	Valley Arena, Holyoke, U.S.	
24	Win	2–6–0	Young George Godfrey	TKO		January 2, 1937	Rockland Palace, New York, U.S.	
23	Win	1–3–0	Jack Rose	KO		December 5, 1936	Rockland Palace, New York, U.S.	
