= Yustin Djanelidze =

Soviet Surgeon of Georgian origin

Yustin Djanelidze (Russian: Юстин Джанелидзе, Georgian: იუსტინ ჯანელიძე; 27 October 1883 – 14 January 1950) was a Soviet-Georgian lieutenant general, Hero of Socialist Labour, and pioneer of cardiac surgery in the 20th century. The era of successful aortic surgery began on 27 October 1913 when Djanelidze sutured a penetrating injury of the ascending aorta in St. Petersburg, Russia. This was the first case of successful ascending aorta repair described in the world medical literature.
