= Jorge Camargo Spolidore =

Colombian musician, composer, and bandleader

- Born: Jorge Enrique Camargo Spolidore; 12 or 18 June 1912; Sogamoso, Colombia
- Died: 29 January 1974 (aged 61) Medellín, Colombia

Jorge Enrique Camargo Spolidore (Note: In this Spanish name, the first or paternal surname is Camargo and the second or maternal family name is Spolidore.) (1912–1974) was a Colombian musician, composer, and bandleader. He composed in traditional Colombian styles and led the Orquesta de Jorge Camargo Spolidore. In the Diccionario de la Música Española e Hispanoamericana, Luis Carlos Rodríguez writes that Camargo "was perhaps, along with Oriol Rangel, the best piano performer that Colombian popular music has ever known."

== Biography ==
Camargo was born on 12 or 18 June 1912 in Sogamoso, in the Colombian department of Boyacá, to Jorge Camargo and Antonieta Spolidore. At the age of 10 he wrote his first song, a tango called "Ingrata", and soon after wrote the pasillo "El Globo". As a child he was a member of the Camargo Spolidore Orchestra, a family band, and he also played in Efraín Orozco Morales' orchestra with his brothers.

In 1946 Camargo was a founder of SAYCO, the Colombian copyright collective, and he later served as president. He created his own orchestra in 1948, and that year his composition "Rapsodia Colombiana" won first prize in a competition run by Fabricato. Camargo recorded his bambuco "Chatica Linda" in 1951 for RCA Victor; José I. Pinilla Aguilar described the song as a "glorious, typical, and anthological page of the Colombian songbook." He later released the album Ensalada de Ritmos and several singles for Sonolux and Codiscos.

Camargo and his orchestra appeared alongside Jaime Llano González on television on 13 June 1954, the first day of broadcasting of television in Colombia. He later appeared regularly on music programmes, and also worked for the radio station Nueva Granada.

In 1968 Camargo had a stroke, and after treatment was able to walk and play piano again. He later moved from Bogotá to Medellín, where he died on 29 January 1974.

== Musical style and compositions ==
Camargo composed in traditional Colombian styles, including bambuco, pasillo, and torbellino. He wrote more than 70 songs, and his notable compositions include "Rapsodia Colombiana", "Chatica Linda", "No te Hagas la Indijerente", "El Globo", "Cuando Seas Mi Mujercita", "Mi Tiple", "Serenata", "Los Trigales", "Tus Manos", "Boquita Mentirisa", "Mi Canoa y Yo", "¿Qué lo Sabrá?", "Ojitos Negros", and "Arroyito". His bambuco "Celos", written c. 1954, is typical for the period in its adherence to traditional arrangement and lyrics.
