= Maximiano Alves =

Maximiano Alves (22 August 1888 – 22 January 1954) was a Portuguese sculptor.

== Biography ==
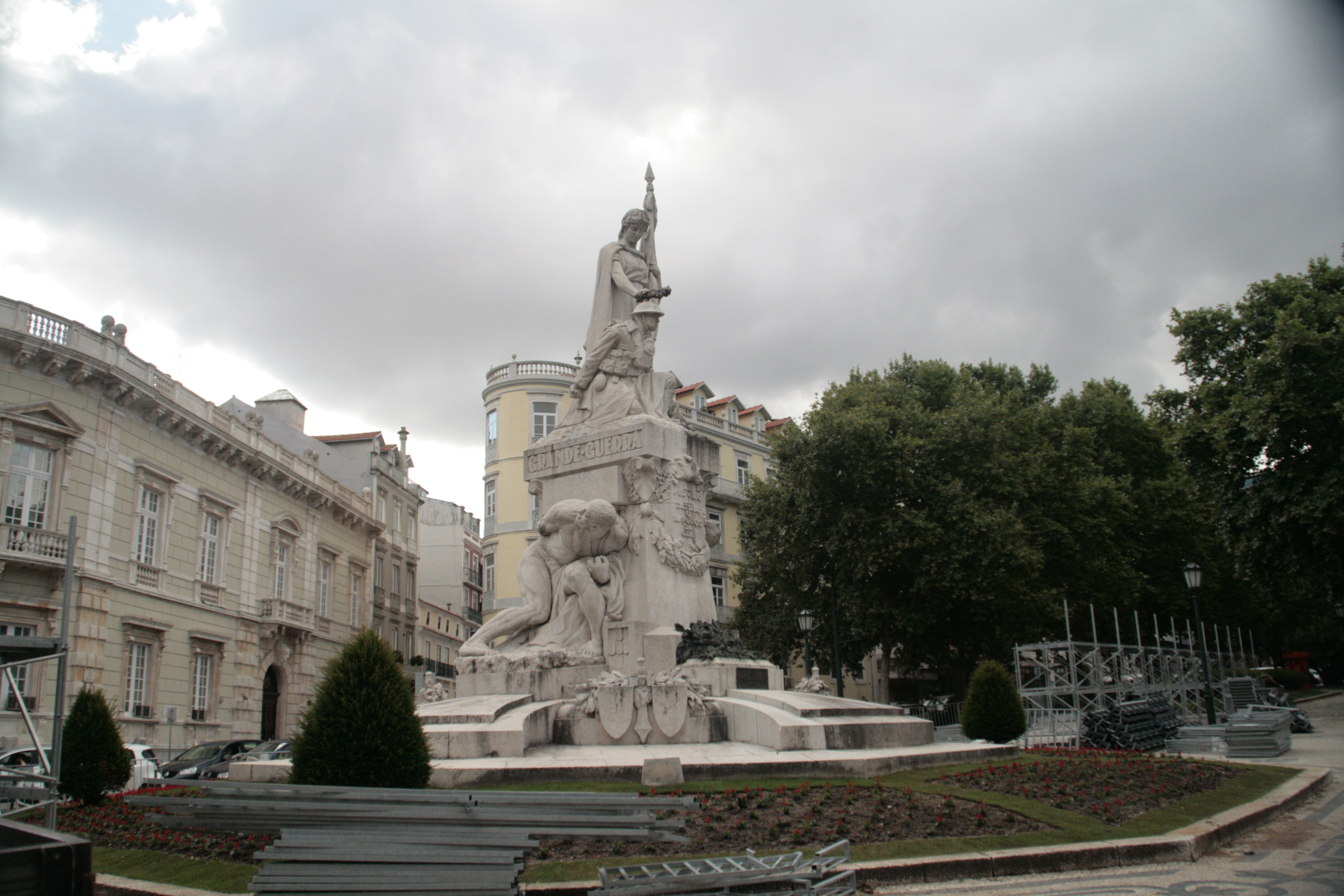
Monumento aos Mortos da Grande Guerra, Avenida da Liberdade, Lisbon

Alves was born in Lisbon. He was the son of the engraver of the mint. He finished his course on sculpture at Lisbon School of Fine Arts in 1911, where he attended with a sculptor Simões de Almeida (his uncle) and two painters Luciano Freire and Ernesto Condeixa.

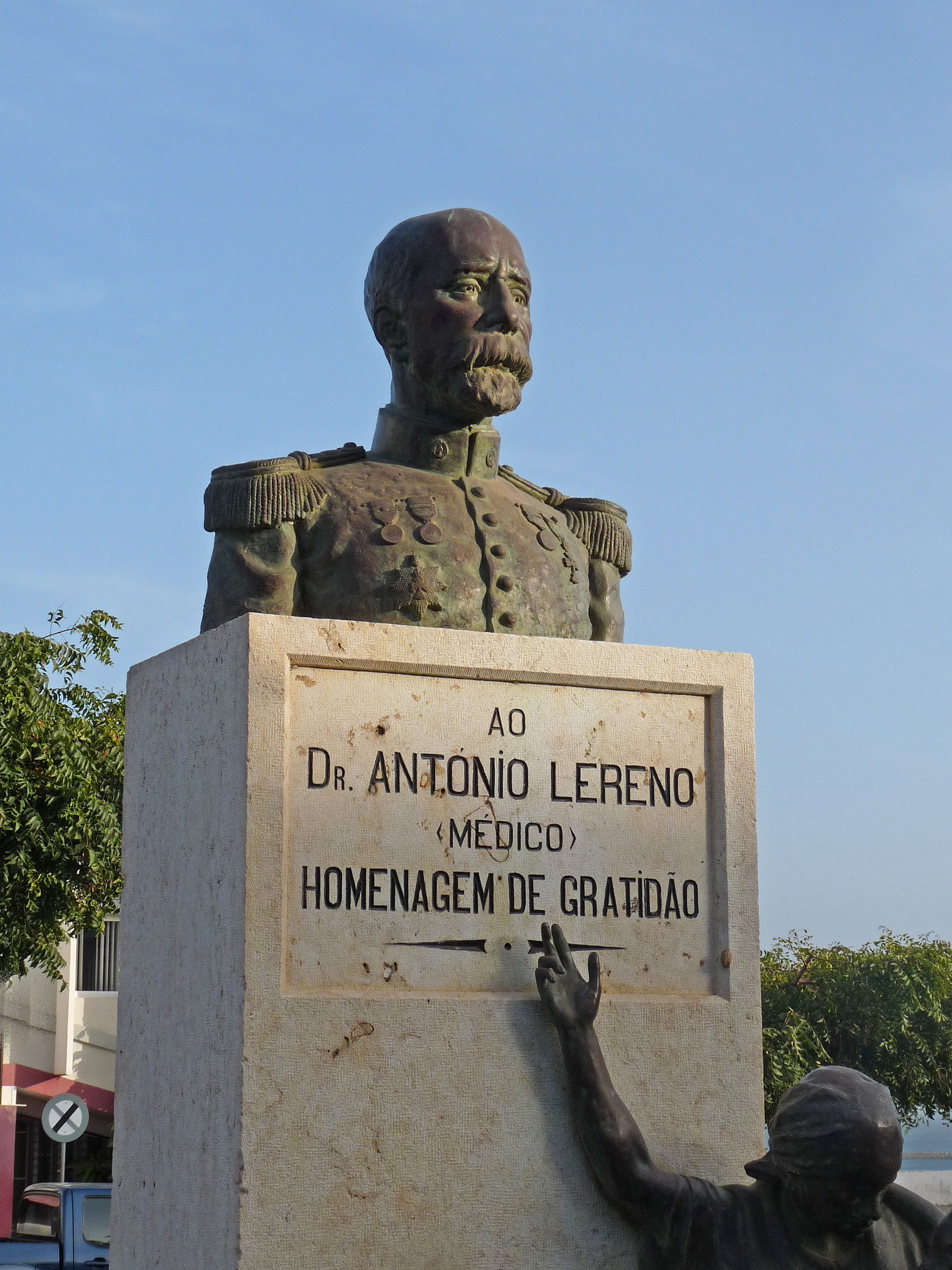
Monument to António Lereno at Lereno Square in the center of Praia

He was awarded with a rank of an official of the Order of Christ, later he took part in the conception and execution of the Great War Monument in Lisbon.

He took part in artistic works in different periodical publications, one example was a review Alma Nova which was published in Faro in 1914.

== Expositions ==
He took part in different expositions including:

- Ibero-American Exposition of 1929, in 1929
- International and Colonial Exposition, Paris, in 1931
- Portuguese World Exhibition, Lisbon. in 1940

== Selected works ==
- Monument to the Fallen Victims of the Great War, Lisbon, 1931
- Fountain at Alviela Canal, Sacavém, 1940
- Sculptures of the Monumental Fountain, Alameda D. Afonso Henriques, Lisboa, c. 1940
- Bust of Marechal Carmona
- Bust of Cesário Verde, Lisbon, 1955
- Bust of D. João da Câmara, Lisbon, 1953
- Bust of Alfredo Augusto Freire de Andrade

At the João de Deus Museum-School:

- Bust of Casimiro Freire
- Bust of Pedro Gomes da Silva

At the Museu da Marinha (Marine Museum)

- Statue of Vasco da Gama
- Statue of D. Manuel I
- Statue of Afonso de Albuquerque

At the Palácio de São Bento

- Statue of Diplomacy (Estátua da Diplomacia), at the "Hall of Sessions" (Sala das Sessões)
- Statue of "Força" ("Strength") at the entrance
- Bust of António Cândido, in the atrium
- Bust of Hintze Ribeiro, in the atrium

In Cape Verde:

- Monument to Dr. António Lereno, at António Loreno Square in the city of Praia

In Macau:

- Monument to the governor João Maria Ferreira do Amaral, 1940
- Monument to Vicente Nicolau de Mesquita, 1940

=== Monument to the Fallen Victims of the Great War, Lisbon ===
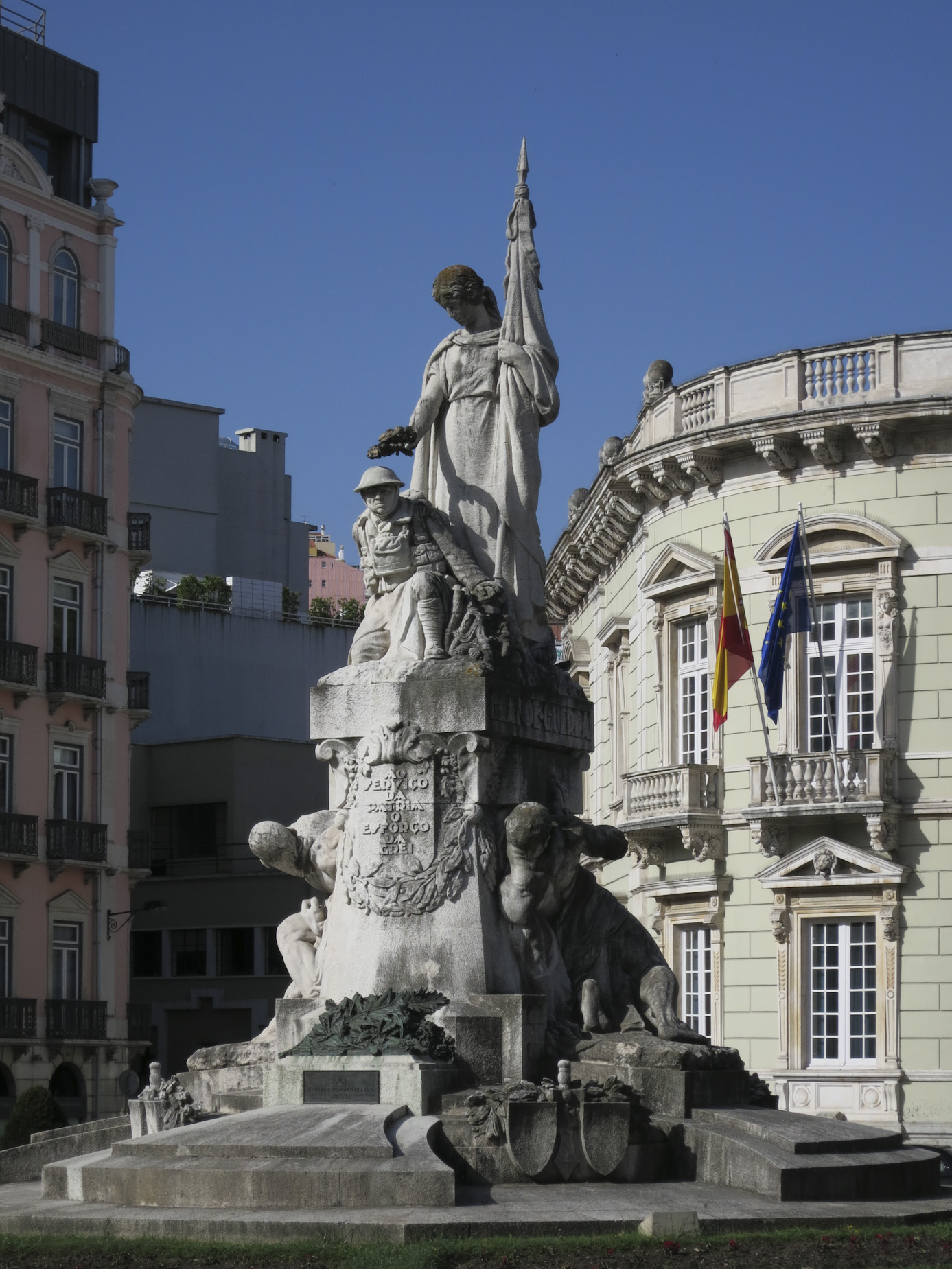

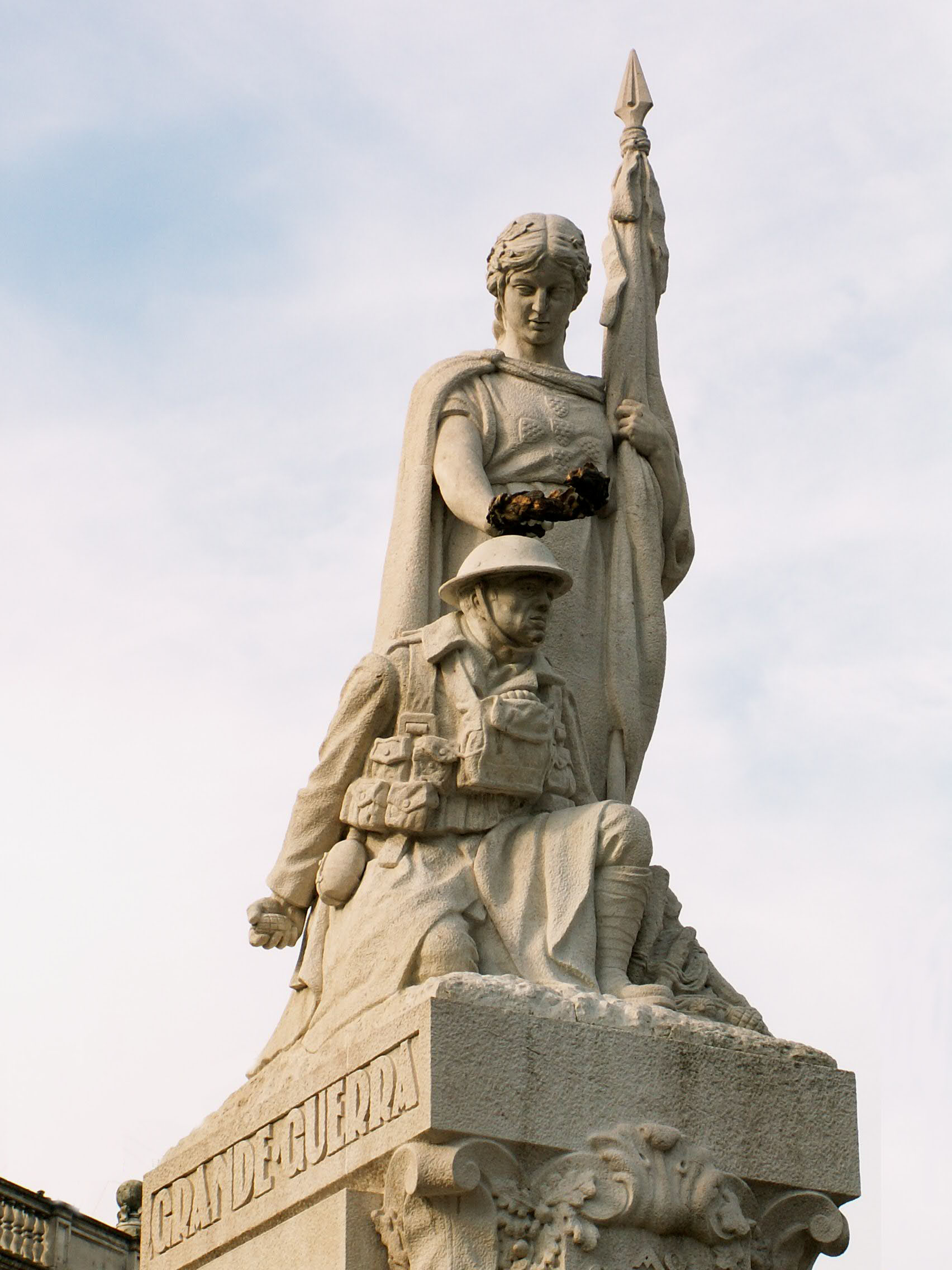

=== Sculptures, Monumental Fountain, Lisbon ===
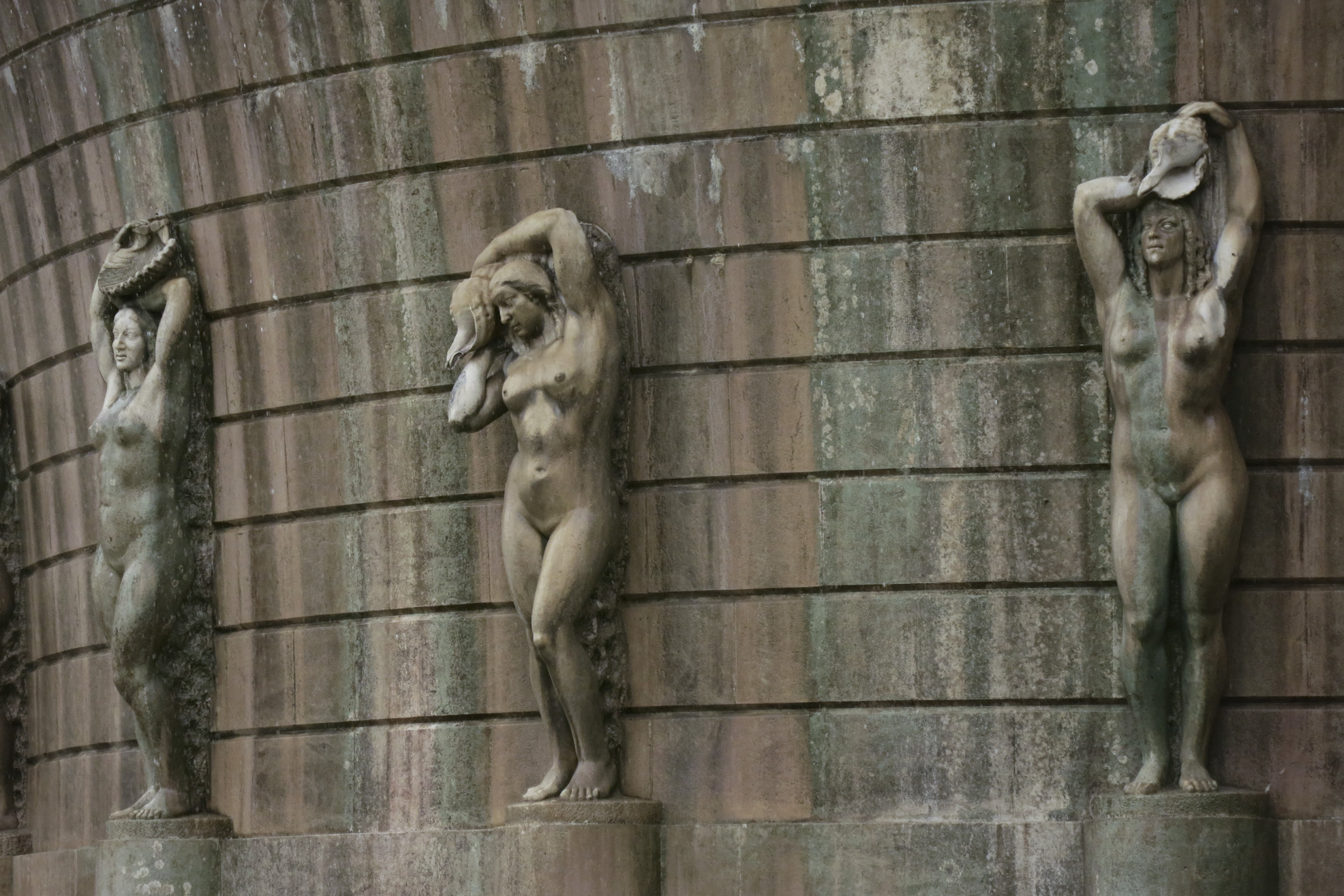

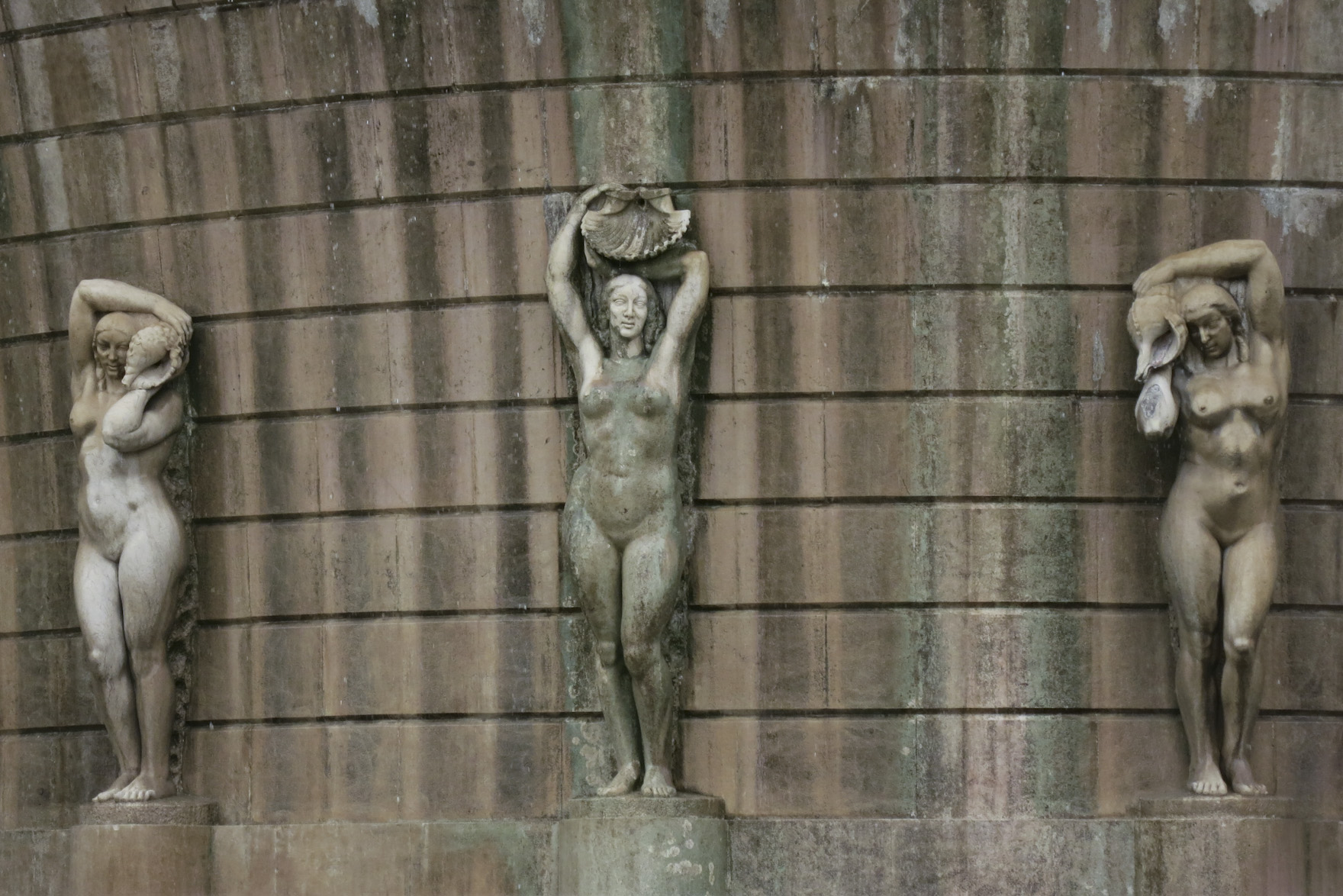

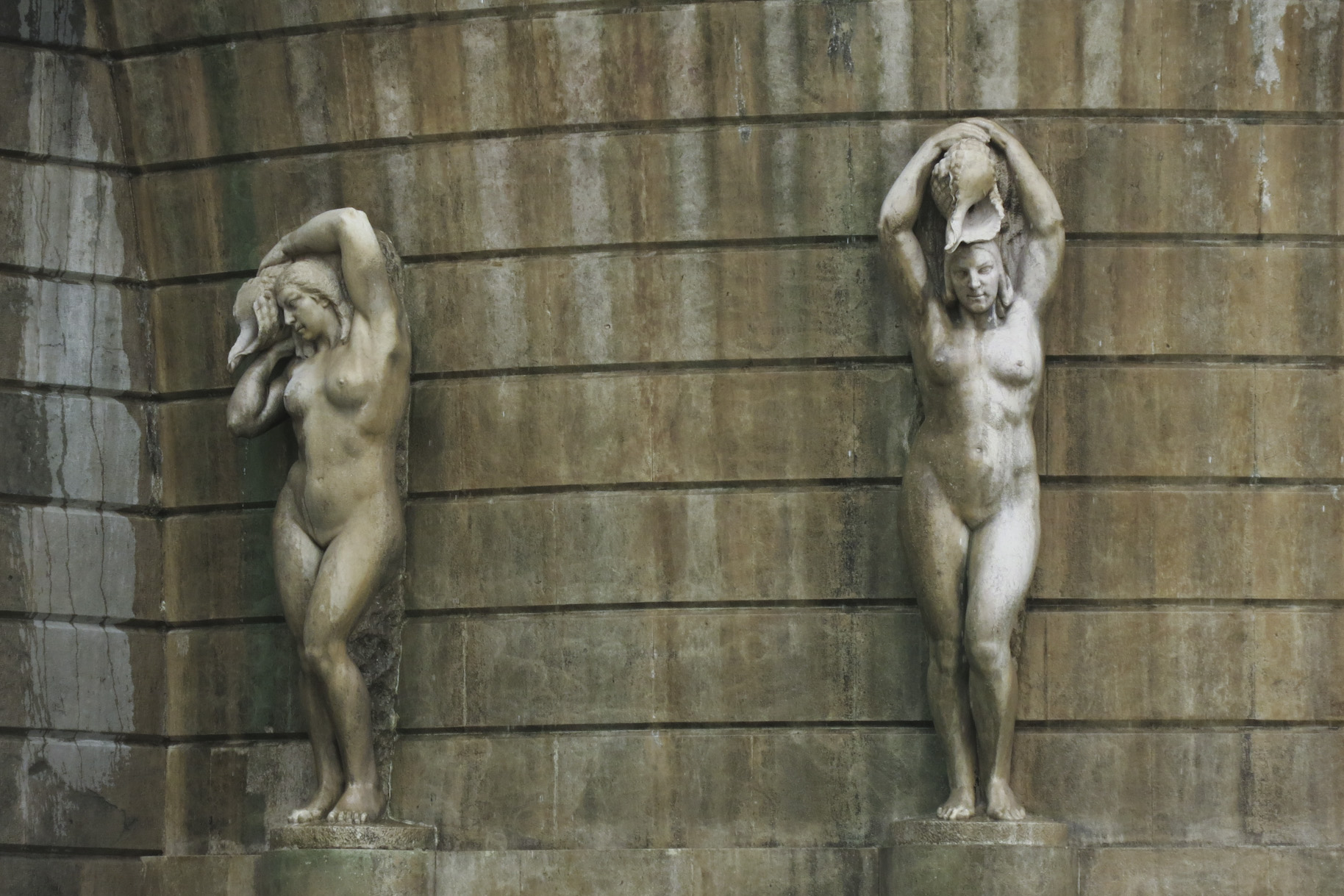

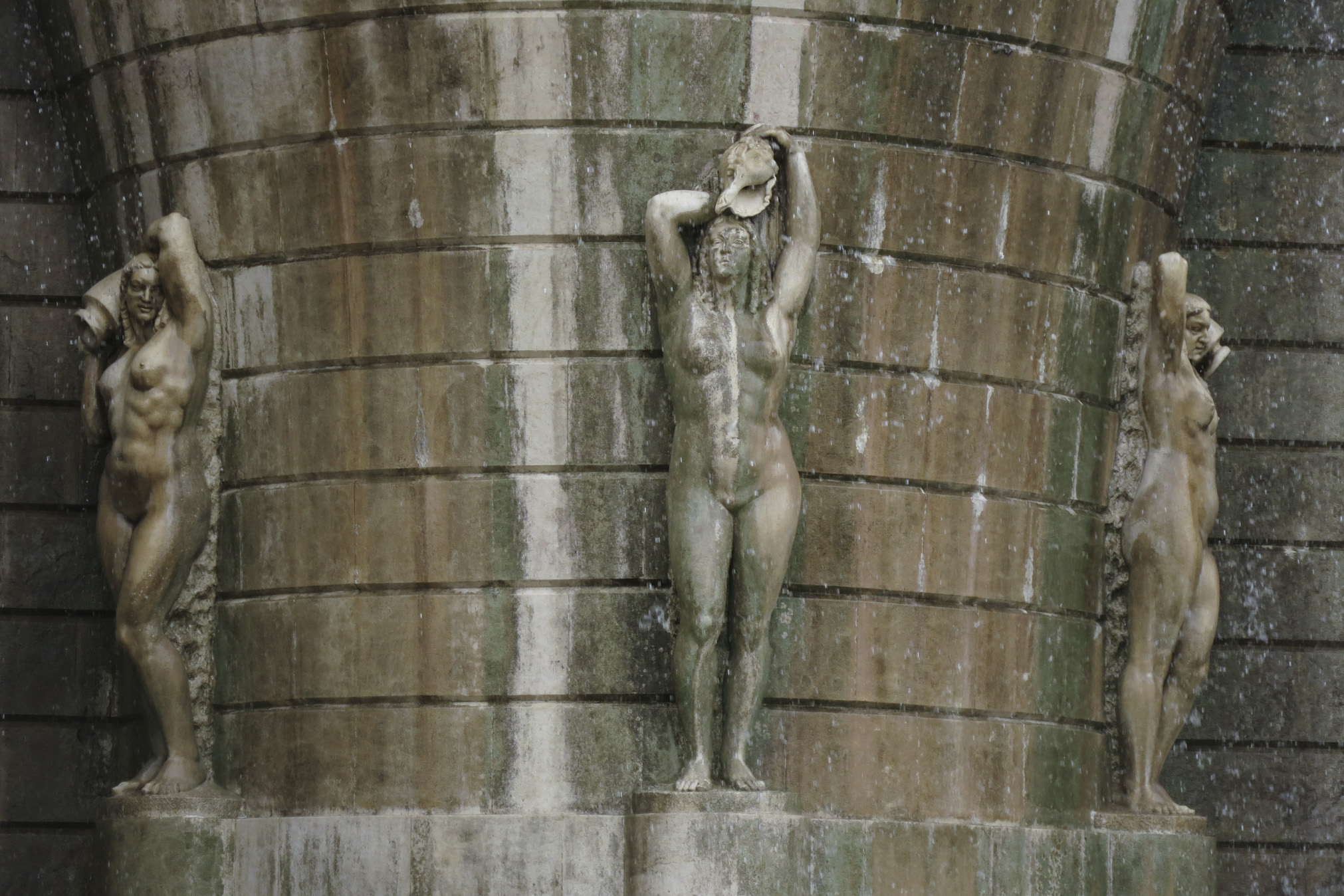

=== Força, Palácio de S. Bento, Lisbon ===
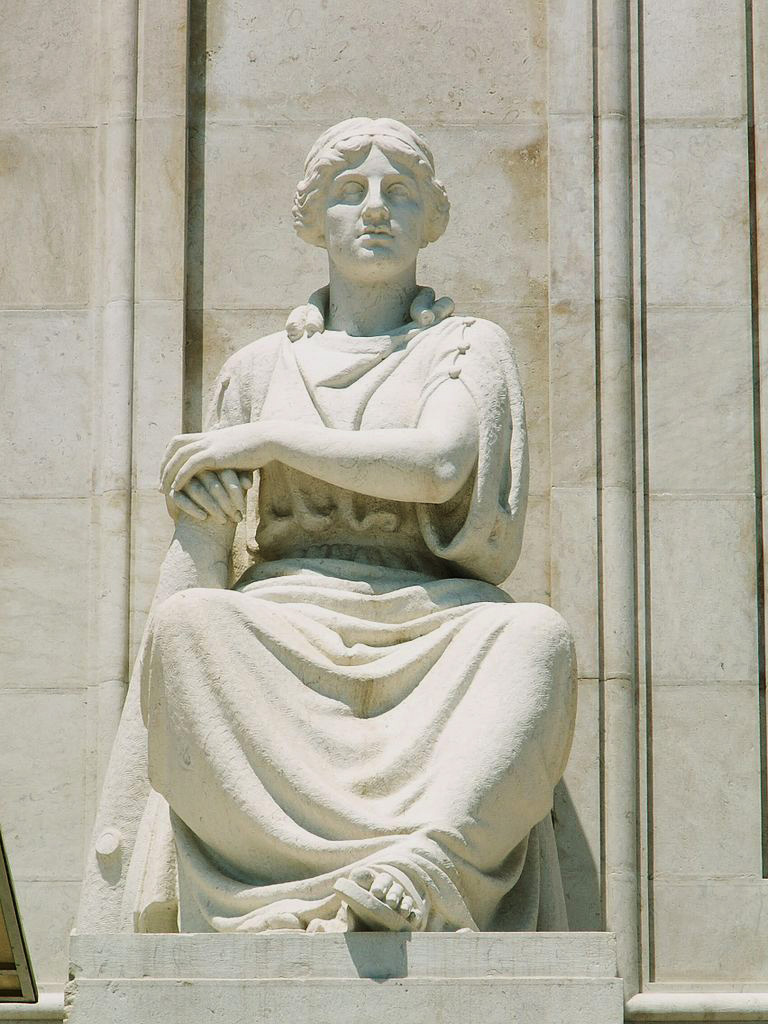

== Bibliography ==
- Bethencourt, Francisco, Chaudhuri, Kirti, dir – A História da expansão Portuguesa (History of the Portuguese Expansion). Lisboa, Circle of Letters, 1998
- Saial, Joaquim – Estatuária Portuguesa dos Anos 30 (1926–1940) (Portuguese Statues in the 1930s (1926–1940)). Lisbon, Bertrand, 1991
