= Statue of Saint Anthony =

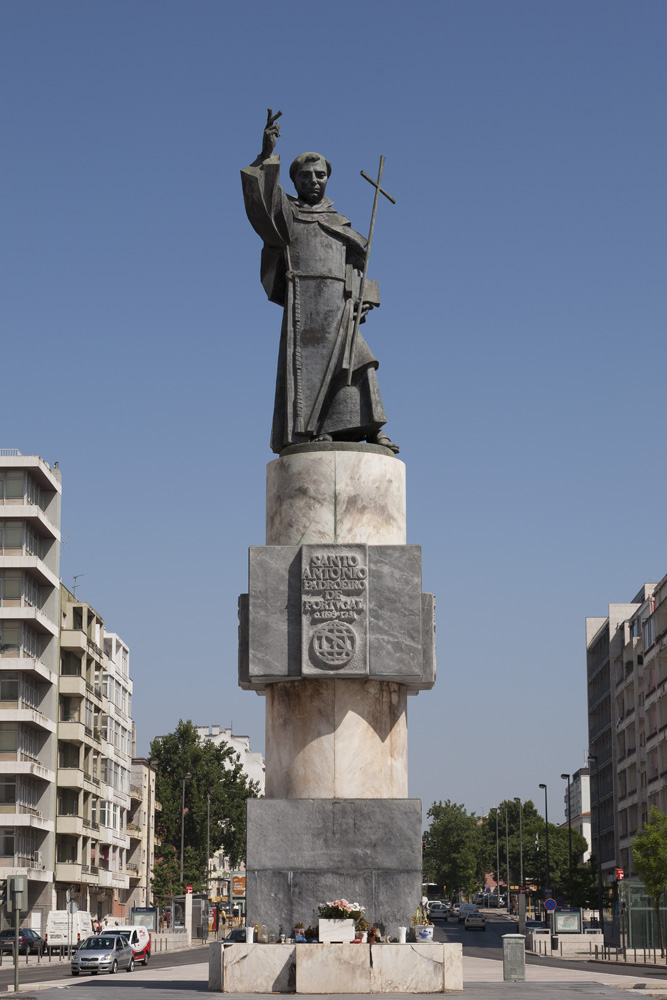
- The Saint Anthony Monument in 2013.
- Interactive map of Statue of Saint Anthony
- Location: Alvalade Square, Lisbon, Portugal
- Coordinates: 38°45′11.23″N 09°08′38.35″W
- Designer: Carlos Antero Ferreira, António Duarte
- Type: Statue
- Material: Bronze, marble
- Height: 12 m (39 ft)
- Completion date: 4 October 1972
- Dedicated to: Anthony of Padua

The statue of Saint Anthony (Portuguese: Monumento a Santo António) is a monument in Lisbon, Portugal, located at the Alvalade Square, within the civil parish of Alvalade. It consists of a bronze statue on a pedestal formed by four marble blocks. It depicts Anthony of Padua, a 12th- and 13th-century Roman Catholic priest, and the official patron saint of the city of Lisbon. The monument was designed by architect Carlos Antero Ferreira and sculptor António Duarte, and unveiled on 4 October 1972.

== History ==
The Saint Anthony Monument was designed by architect Carlos Antero Ferreira and sculptor António Duarte, and constructed between 1970 and 1972. It was unveiled at the Alvalade Square on 4 October 1972.

== Characteristics ==
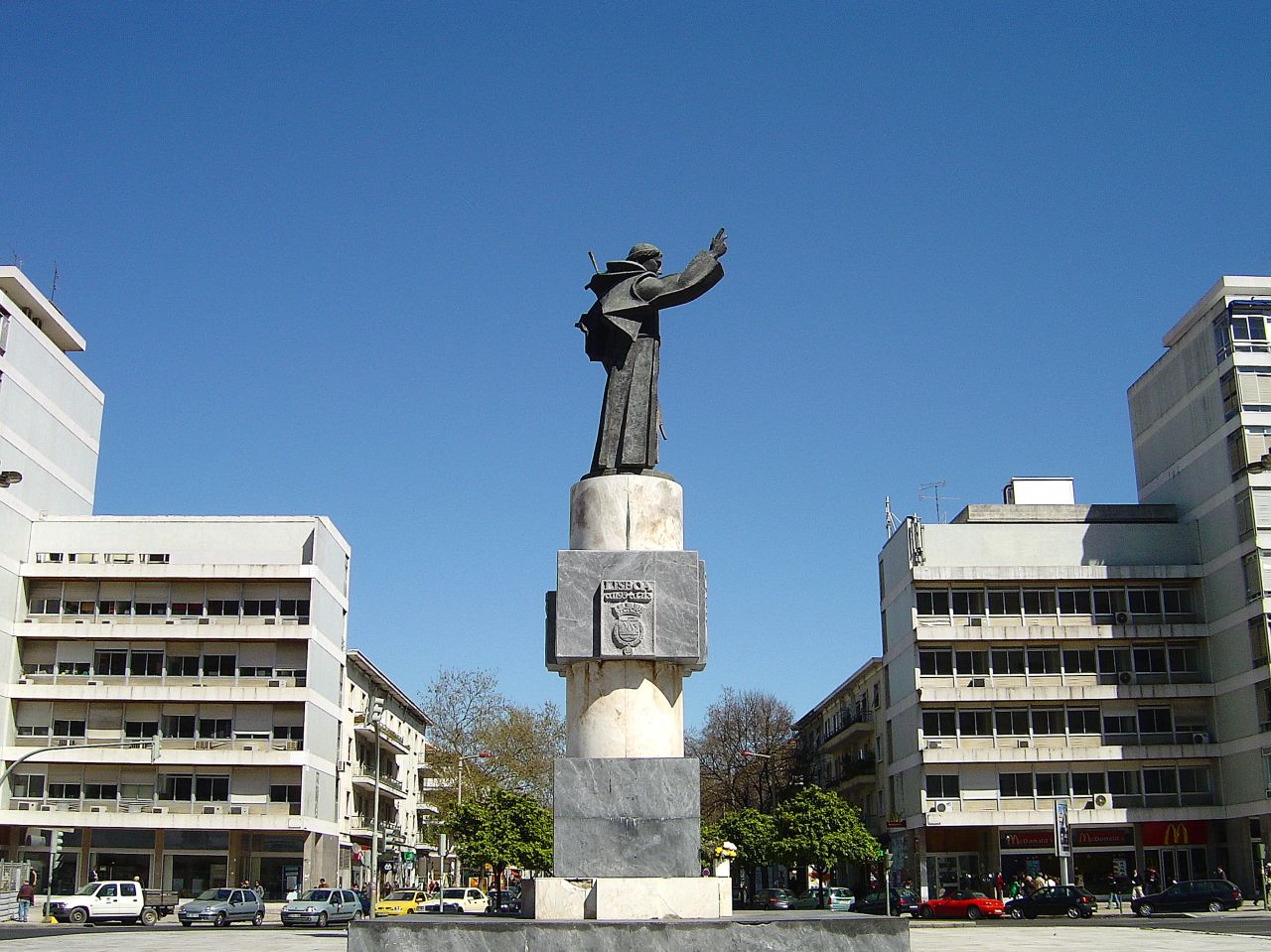
The side of the Saint Anthony Monument, in 2007.

The Saint Anthony Monument is located within the centre of the Alvalade Square, which is surrounded by a roundabout, that forms a crossing between the Igreja Avenue and the Roma Avenue. It is located within a civil parish of Alvalade.

The monument consists of a 5.5-metre-tall (18 ft) bronze statue, placed on a pedestal formed by 4 marble blocks with sculptures on them. The total height of the monument is 12 m (39 ft), and it weighs 78 tons. The statue depicts Anthony of Padua, a 12th- and 13th-century Roman Catholic priest, who is the official patron saint of the city of Lisbon, with day of his death, 13 June, being celebrated as municipal holiday, known as the Saint Anthony's Day.
