= Alvalade Square =

Urban square and roundabout in Lisbon, Portugal

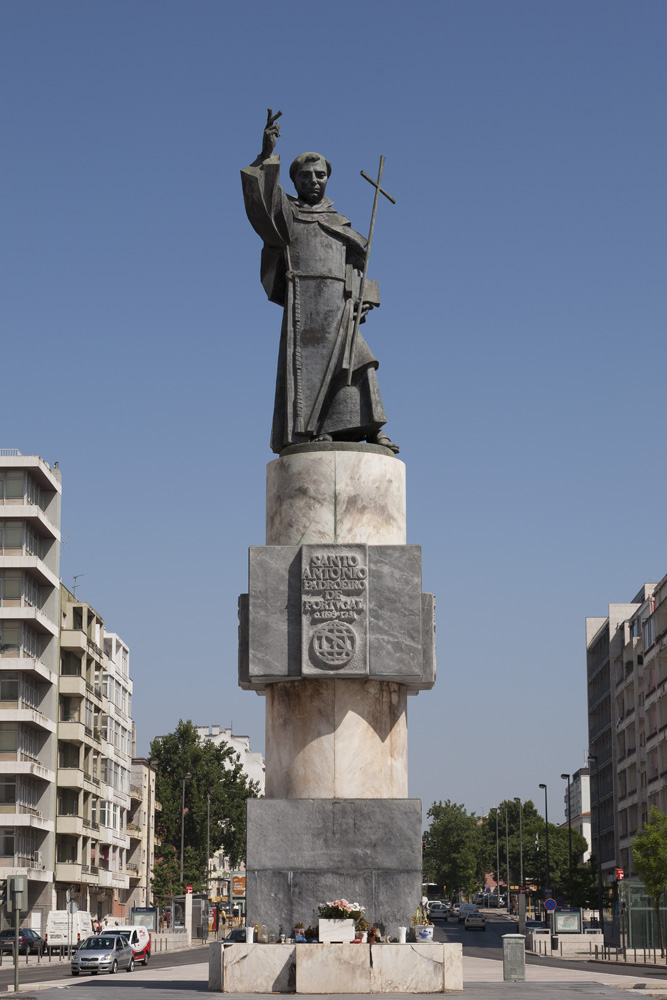
- The statue of Saint Anthony, located at the centre of the square.

- Location within Portugal
- Type: Urban square, roundabout
- Location: Alvalade, Lisbon, Portugal
- Coordinates: 38°45′11.20″N 09°08′38.40″W
- North: Roma Avenue
- East: Roma Avenue
- South: Roma Avenue
- West: Ireja Avenue

Construction
- Completion: 1940s

Alvalade Square (Portuguese pronunciation: [alvɐˈlaðɨ]; Portuguese: Praça de Alvalade) is an urban square in the city of Lisbon, Portugal, within the civil parish of Alvalade. It forms a roundabout at the intersection of Igreja and Roma Avenues, and is surrounded by the mid-rise apartment and commercial buildings. The square and its surroundings were developed in the 1940s. At the centre, the square features the statue of Saint Anthony, a 12-metre-tall (39.37 ft.) monument, designed by Carlos Antero Ferreira and sculptor António Duarte, and unveiled in 1972. It depicts Anthony of Padua, a 12th- and 13th-century Roman Catholic priest, who is the official patron saint of the city of Lisbon. The square also includes the entrances to the Alvalade station of the Lisbon Metro underground rapid transit system.

== History ==
The square was developed in the 1940s, during the construction of the housing estate of Alvalade. It was originally named Monk Luís de Sousa Square (Portuguese: Largo Frei Luís de Sousa), after Luís de Sousa, a 16th- and 17th-century monk and prose-writer.

On 18 June 1972, the Alvalade station of the Lisbon Metro underground rapid transit system, was opened with the entrances located around the square. It was designed by architect Denis Gome, with wall artworks by Maria Keil. Its construction lasted from 1966 to 1972.

On 25 October 1971, the square was renamed Alvalade Square (Portuguese: Praça de Alvalade). On 4 October 1972, the statue of Saint Anthony was unveiled at its centre. It was designed by architect Carlos Antero Ferreira and sculptor António Duarte, between 1970 and 1972.

== Characteristics ==
Alvalade Square is centred on a roundabout at the intersection of Igreja and Roma Avenues. It is surrounded by the mid-rise apartment and commercial buildings. At its centre, it features the statue of Saint Anthony. The monument takes form of a bronze statue with a height of 5.5 m (18 ft.), placed on a pedestal formed of four marble blocks featuring reliefs. It has a total height of 12 m (39.37 ft.), and weighs 78 tons. The statue depicts Anthony of Padua, a 12th- and 13th-century Roman Catholic priest, who is the official patron saint of the city of Lisbon, with the day of his death, 13 June, being celebrated as a municipal holiday, known as the Saint Anthony's Day. The monument was designed by architect Carlos Antero Ferreira and sculptor António Duarte, and unveiled in 1972.

The square also includes the entrances to the Alvalade station of the Lisbon Metro underground rapid transit system.

== Gallery ==
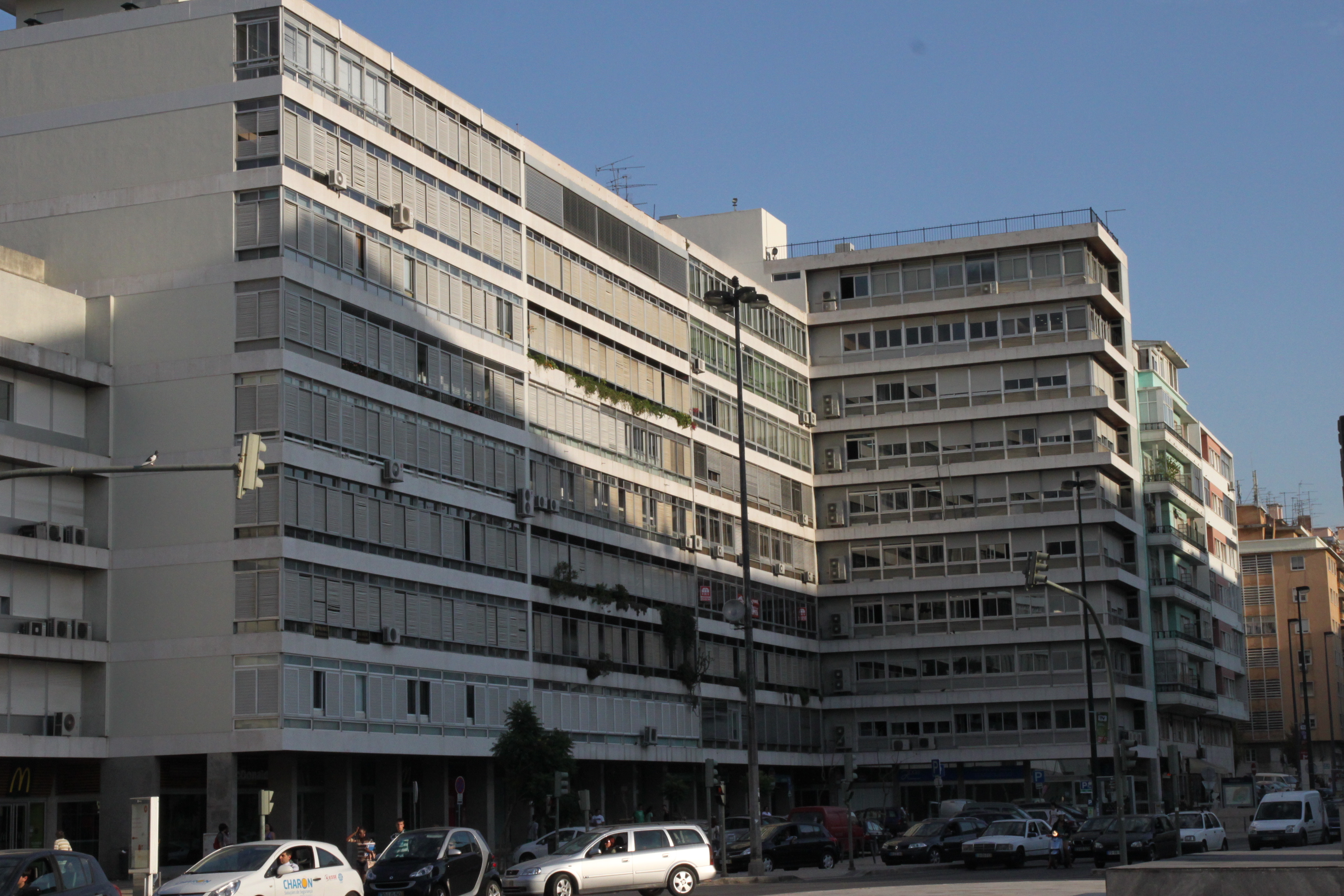
The appartment buildings at 18 and 18B Alvalade Square.

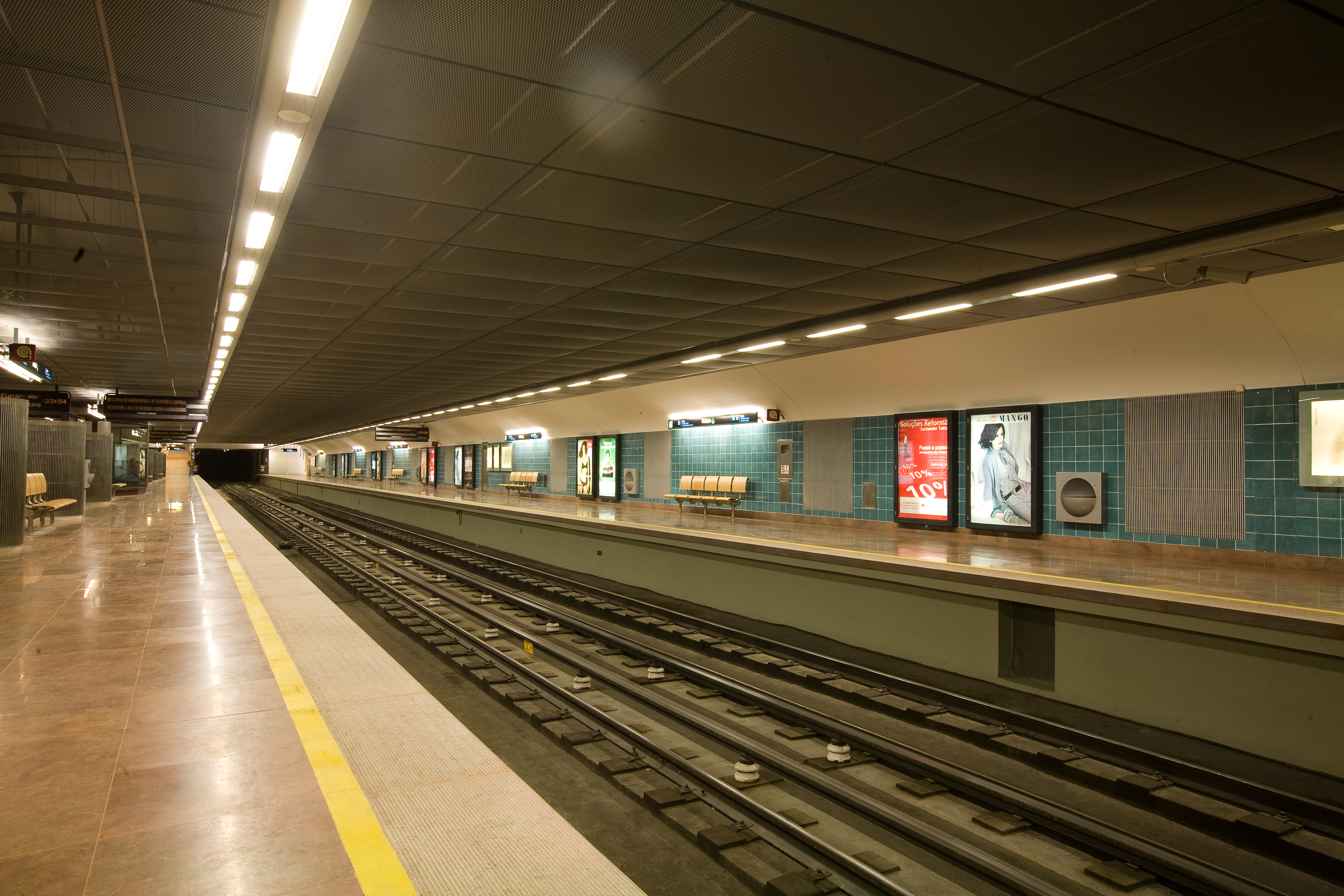
The Alvalade metro station, located underneath the square.

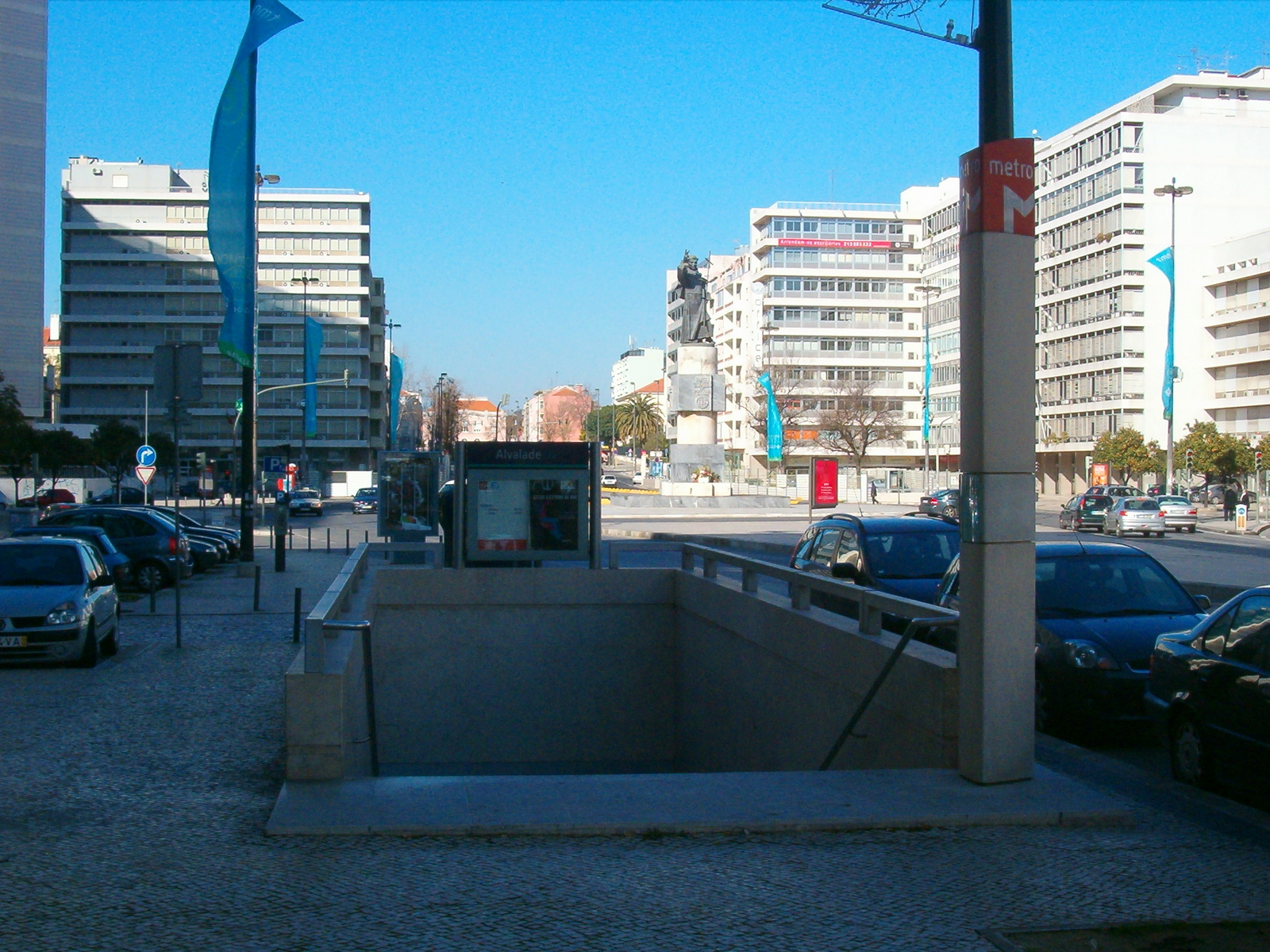
The entrance to the Alvalade metro station, with the apartment buildings around the square in the background.
