= Fernão Álvares do Oriente =

Portuguese poet (1540–1597)

- Born: c. 1540; Goa, Portuguese India
- Died: 1597 (aged 56–57)
- Occupation: Poet
- Writing career
- Notable work: Lusitania Transformada (1607)

Fernão Álvares do Oriente (c. 1540–c. 1597) was a Portuguese poet born in Goa (then part of Portuguese India), known for his unfinished work titled Lusitania Transformada, published posthumously in Lisbon in 1607.
