= Avenida Station =

Metro station in Lisbon, Portugal

Avenida
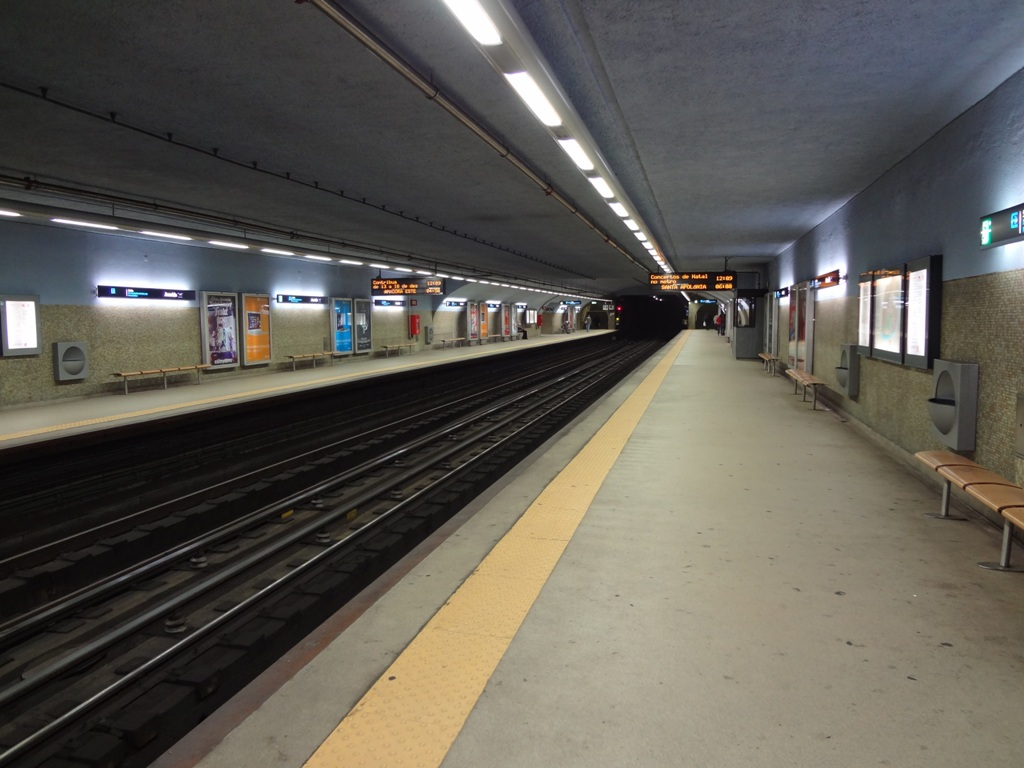

General information
- Location: Avenida da Liberdade, Lisbon; Portugal
- Coordinates: 38°43′12″N 9°8′45″W
- Owner: Government-owned corporation
- Operator: Metropolitano de Lisboa, EPE
- Line: Blue Line
- Platforms: 2 side platforms
- Tracks: 2

Construction
- Structure type: Underground
- Accessible: yes
- Architect: Falcão e Cunha

Other information
- Station code: AV
- Fare zone: L

History
- Opened: December 29, 1959 (66 years ago)
- Rebuilt: November 9, 1982 (43 years ago) June 8, 2009 (17 years ago)

Services
Preceding station	Lisbon Metro	Following station
Marquês de Pombal towards Reboleira	Blue Line	Restauradores towards Santa Apolónia
Route map
Location

Avenida Station is part of the Blue Line of the Lisbon Metro.

== History ==
Avenida is one of eleven stations that belong to the original Lisbon Metro network, opened on December 29, 1959. It is located on Avenida da Liberdade, from which it takes its name. The architectural design of the original station is by Falcão e Cunha.

On November 9, 1982, the station was extended, based on the architectural design of Sanchez Jorge. On June 8, 2009, it was refurbished, based on the architectural design of Ana Nascimento

== Connections ==
=== Urban buses ===
==== Carris ====
- 202 Cais do Sodré ⇄ Fetais (morning service)
- 709 Campo de Ourique ⇄ Restauradores
- 711 Terreiro do Paço ⇄ Alto da Damaia
- 732 Marquês de Pombal ⇄ Caselas
- 736 Cais do Sodré ⇄ Odivelas (Bairro Dr. Lima Pimentel)

==== Aerobus ====
- Linha 1 Aeroporto ⇄ Cais do Sodré

== See also ==
- List of Lisbon metro stations
