= Praça de Espanha Station =

Metro station in Lisbon, Portugal

Praça de Espanha
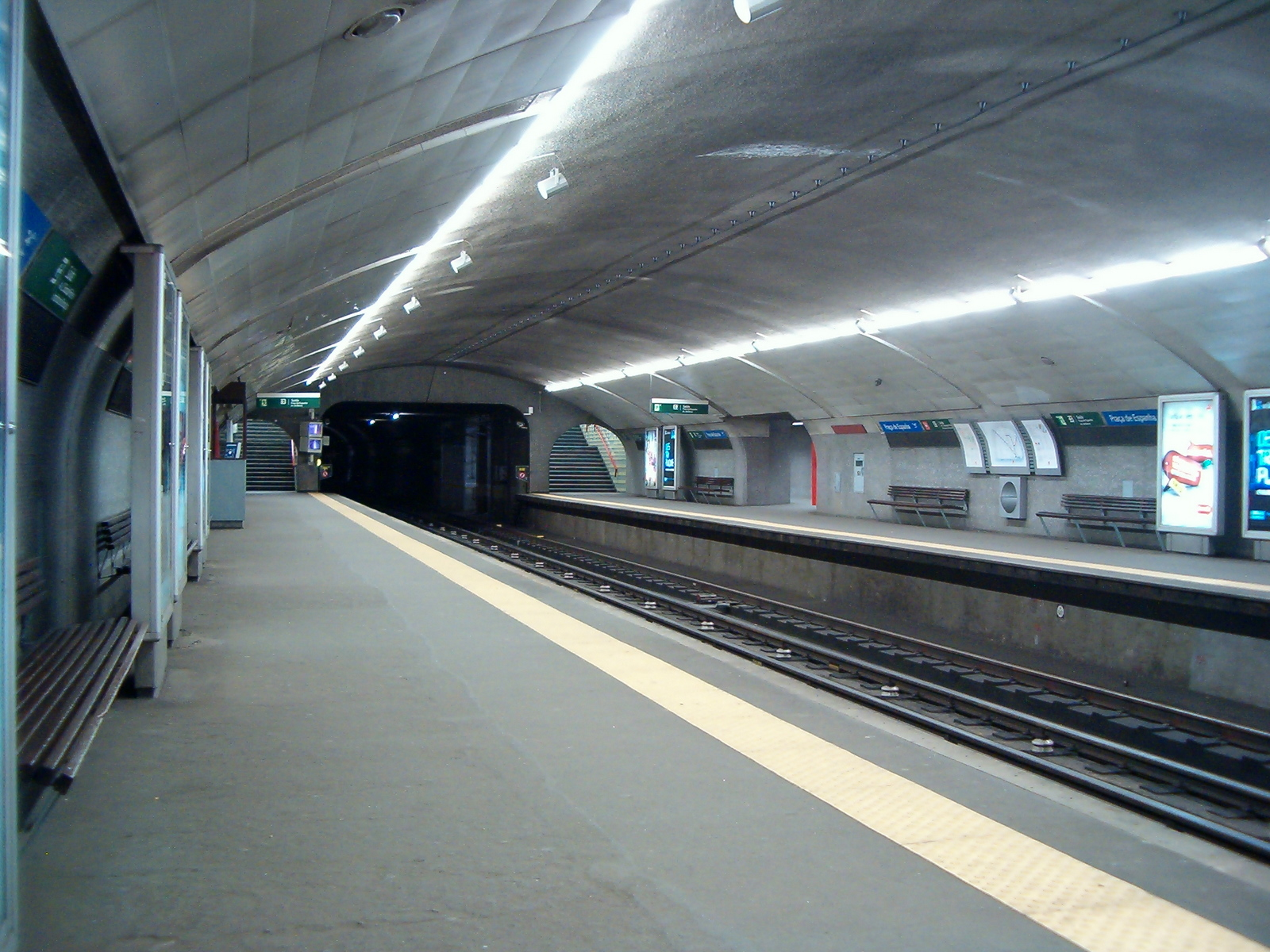

General information
- Location: Praça de Espanha, Lisbon; Portugal
- Coordinates: 38°44′15″N 9°9′34″W
- Owner: Government-owned corporation
- Operator: Metropolitano de Lisboa, EPE
- Line: Blue Line
- Platforms: 2 side platforms
- Tracks: 2

Construction
- Structure type: Underground
- Accessible: No
- Architect: Falcão e Cunha

Other information
- Station code: PE
- Fare zone: L

History
- Opened: 29 December 1959 (66 years ago)
- Rebuilt: 15 October 1980 (45 years ago)
- Former names: Palhavã

Services
| Preceding station | Lisbon Metro | Following station |
|---|---|---|
| Jardim Zoológico towards Reboleira | Blue Line | São Sebastião towards Santa Apolónia |
Route map
Location

Praça de Espanha station is part of the Blue Line of the Lisbon Metro.

== History ==
It is one of the 11 stations that belong to the original Lisbon Metro network, opened on 29 December 1959, as Palhavã. This station is located in Praça de Espanha, hence its renaming.

The architectural design of the original station is by Francisco Keil do Amaral. On 15 October 1980, the station was extended, based on the architectural design of Sanchez Jorge.

== Connections ==
=== Urban buses ===
==== Carris ====
- 716 Alameda D. A. Henriques ⇄ Benfica - Al. Padre Álvaro Proença
- 726 Sapadores ⇄ Pontinha Centro
- 746 Marquês de Pombal ⇄ Estação Damaia
- 756 Olaias ⇄ Rua da Junqueira

==== Aerobus ====
- Linha 2 Aeroporto ⇄ Sete Rios

=== Suburban buses ===
==== Transportes Sul do Tejo ====
- 151 Charneca de Caparica (Solmar) ⇄ Lisboa (Marquês de Pombal)
- 152 Almada ⇄ Lisboa (Praça de Espanha) (via Alcântara)
- 153 Costa de Caparica ⇄ Lisboa (Praça de Espanha) (via Alcântara)
- 158 Lisboa (Praça de Espanha) ⇄ Trafaria (via Alcântara)
- 159 Lisboa (Praça de Espanha) ⇄ Marisol (via Alcântara)
- 160 Almada ⇄ Lisboa (Praça do Areeiro) (via Alcântara)
- 161 Costa da Caparica ⇄ Lisboa (Praça do Areeiro) (via Alcântara)
- 162 Lisboa (Praça de Espanha) ⇄ Quinta do Brasileiro
- 168 Lisboa (Praça de Espanha) ⇄ Torre da Marinha/Depósito de Água (via Amora)
- 176 Almada (Praça S. J. Batista) ⇄ Lisboa (Cidade Universitária) (via Alcântara)
- 207 Lisboa (Praça de Espanha) ⇄ Sesimbra (via AE)
- 252 Lisboa (Praça de Espanha) ⇄ Quinta do Conde (via Redondos)
- 260 Lisboa (Praça de Espanha) ⇄ Sesimbra (via Laranjeiro)
- 561 Lisboa ⇄ Setúbal (via Ponte 25 de Abril) (Rápida)
- 563 Lisboa ⇄ Setúbal (via Ponte Vasco da Gama e Pinhal Novo) (Rápida)
- 754 Lisboa ⇄ Setúbal (via AE e Casal do Marco)
- 755 Lisboa (Praça de Espanha) ⇄ Setúbal (via Laranjeiro)

== See also ==
- List of Lisbon metro stations
