= Restauradores Station =

Metro station in Lisbon, Portugal

Restauradores
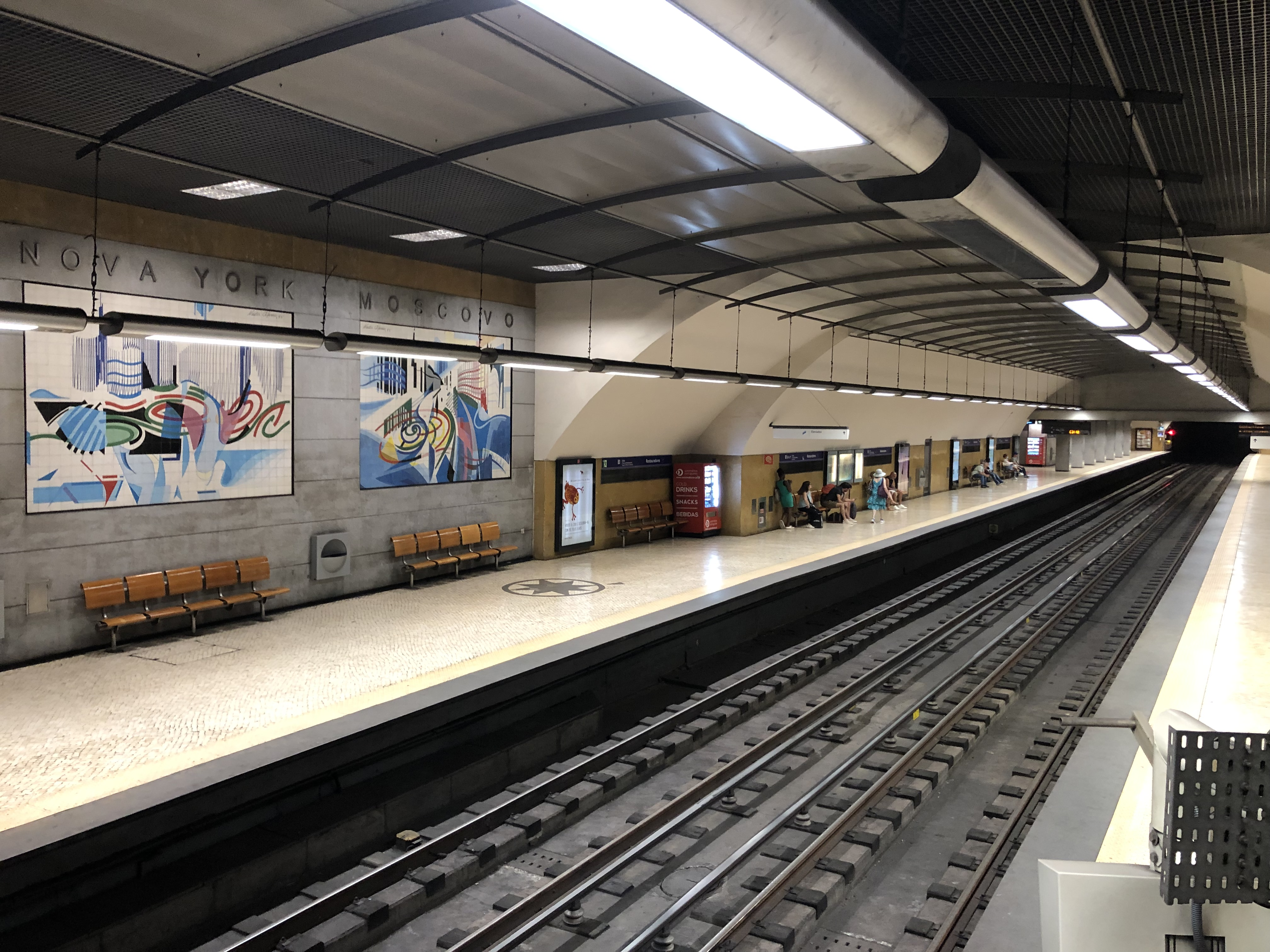

General information
- Location: Praça dos Restauradores, Lisbon; Portugal
- Coordinates: 38°42′54″N 9°8′29″W
- Owner: Government-owned corporation
- Operator: Metropolitano de Lisboa, EPE
- Line: Blue Line
- Platforms: 2 side platforms
- Tracks: 2
- Connections: Rossio

Construction
- Structure type: Underground
- Accessible: yes
- Architect: Falcão e Cunha

Other information
- Station code: RE
- Fare zone: L

History
- Opened: December 29, 1959 (66 years ago)
- Rebuilt: February 11, 1977 (49 years ago) September 15, 1994 (31 years ago) August 8, 1998 (28 years ago)

Services
| Preceding station | Lisbon Metro | Following station |
|---|---|---|
| Avenida towards Reboleira | Blue Line | Baixa-Chiado towards Santa Apolónia |
Route map
Location

Restauradores station is on the Blue Line of the Lisbon Metro.

== History ==
It is one of the 11 stations that belong to the original Lisbon Metro network, opened on December 29, 1959. This station is located under Praça dos Restauradores, from which it takes its name, and connects to Rossio railway station on the Sintra Line. The architectural design of the original station is by Falcão e Cunha.

On February 11, 1977, the station was extended, based on the architectural design of Benoliel de Carvalho. On September 15, 1994, the north atrium of the station was refurbished, based on the architectural design of Sanchez Jorge. On August 8, 1998, the south atrium of the station was refurbished, based on the architectural design of Manuel Ponte.

== Connections ==
=== Urban buses ===
==== Carris ====
- Ascensor da Glória
- 202 Cais do Sodré ⇄ Fetais (morning service)
- 709 Campo de Ourique ⇄ Restauradores
- 711 Terreiro do Paço ⇄ Alto da Damaia
- 732 Marquês de Pombal ⇄ Caselas
- 736 Cais do Sodré ⇄ Odivelas (Bairro Dr. Lima Pimentel)
- 759 Restauradores ⇄ Estação Oriente (Interface)

==== Aerobus ====
- Linha 1 Aeroporto ⇄ Cais do Sodré

=== Rail ===
==== Comboios de Portugal ====
- Sintra ⇄ Rossio Station
- Mira Sintra-Meleças ⇄ Rossio Station

== See also ==
- List of Lisbon metro stations
