= São Sebastião Station =

Metro station in Lisbon, Portugal

São Sebastião
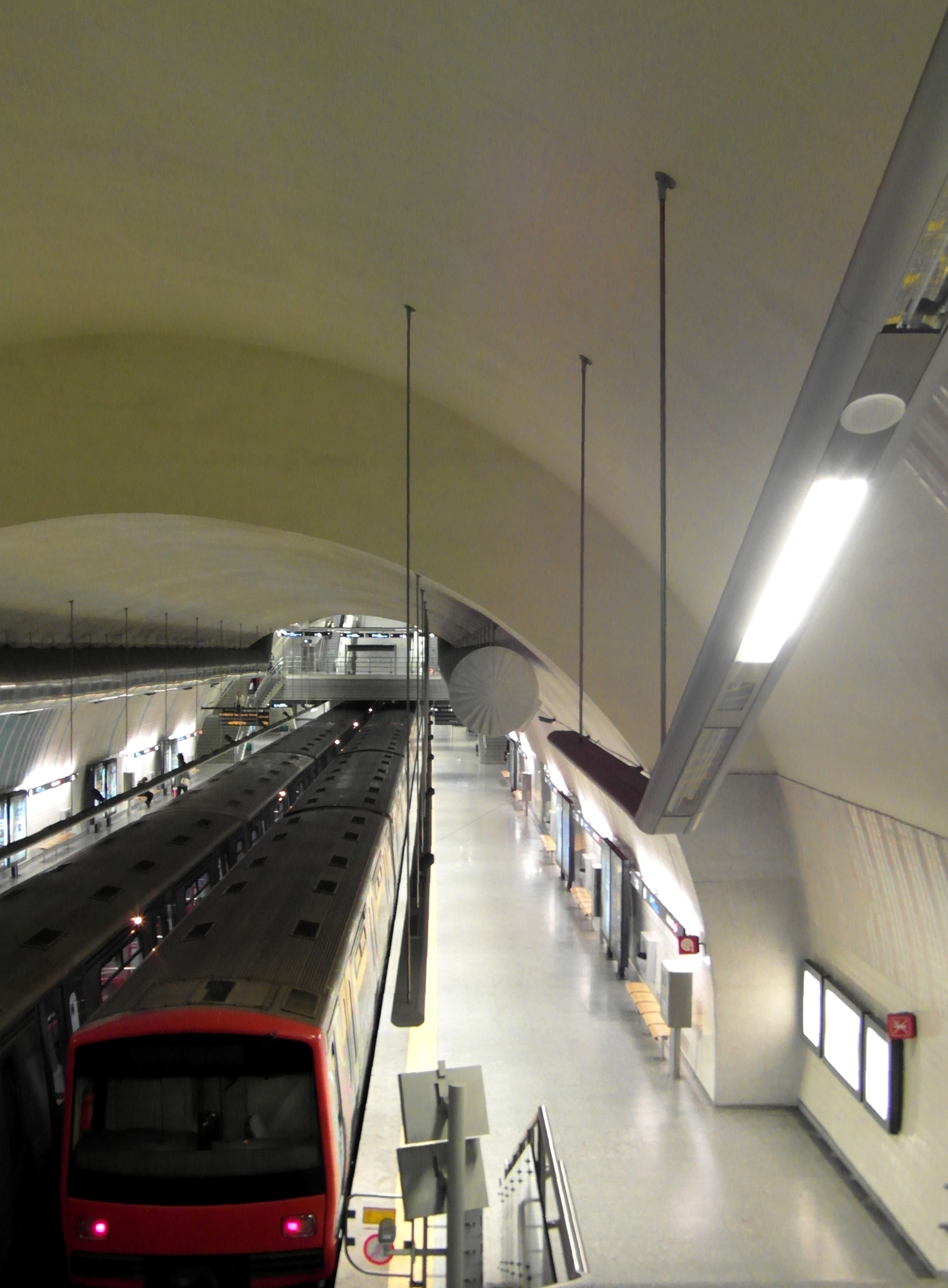
- Red line platforms

General information
- Location: Avenida António Augusto de Aguiar, Lisbon; Portugal
- Coordinates: 38°44′04″N 9°09′16″W
- Owner: Government-owned corporation
- Operator: Metropolitano de Lisboa, EPE
- Line: Blue Line Red Line
- Platforms: 4 side platforms
- Tracks: 4

Construction
- Structure type: Underground
- Accessible: yes
- Architect: Blue Line: Francisco Keil do Amaral; Red Line: Tiago Henriques

Other information
- Station code: SS
- Fare zone: L

History
- Opened: Blue Line: 29 December 1959 (66 years ago); Red Line: 29 August 2009 (16 years ago)
- Rebuilt: Blue Line: 18 April 1977 (49 years ago); Blue Line: 29 August 2009 (16 years ago)

Services
Preceding station	Lisbon Metro	Following station
Praça de Espanha towards Reboleira	Blue Line	Parque towards Santa Apolónia
Terminus	Red Line	Saldanha towards Aeroporto
Route map
Location

São Sebastião is an interchange station where the Blue and Red Lines of the Lisbon Metro connect, being located on Avenida António Augusto de Aguiar in the São Sebastião da Pedreira neighbourhood.

== History ==
The Blue Line station is one of the 11 stations that belong to the original Lisbon Metro network, opened on 29 December 1959.

The architectural design of the original Blue Line station is by Francisco Keil do Amaral. On 18 April 1997 the Blue Line station was extended, based on the architectural design of Dinis Gomes.

On 29 August 2009 the Red Line station was built, based on the architectural design of Tiago Henriques, and the Blue Line station was refurbished, also based on the architectural design of Tiago Henriques.

== Connections ==
=== Urban buses ===
==== Carris ====
- 713 Alameda D. A. Henriques ⇄ Estação Campolide
- 742 Bairro Madre Deus (Escola) ⇄ Casalinho da Ajuda
- 746 Marquês de Pombal ⇄ Estação Damaia

== See also ==
- List of Lisbon metro stations
