= Parque Station =

Metro station in Lisbon, Portugal

Parque
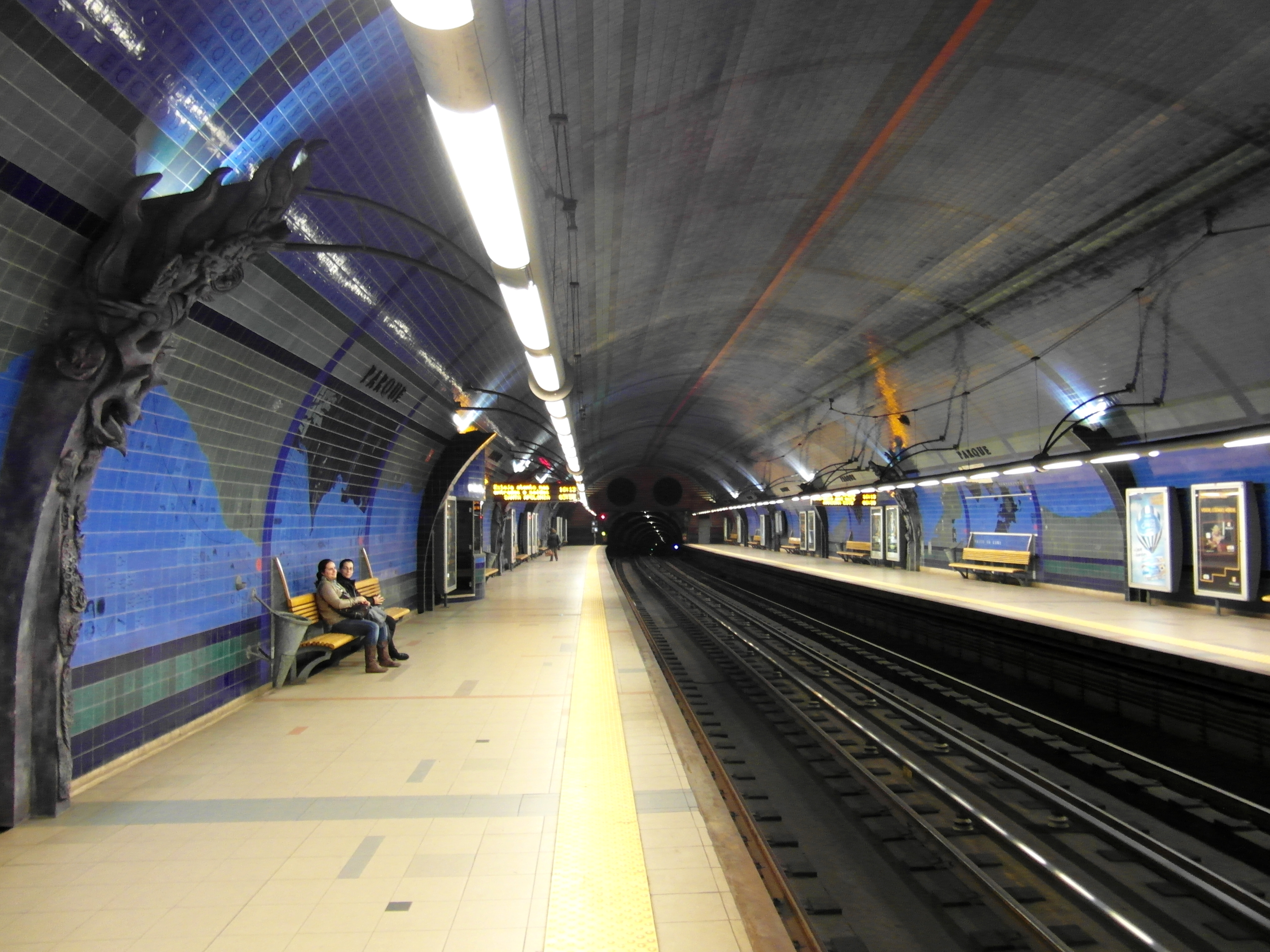

General information
- Location: Avenida António Augusto de Aguiar, Lisbon; Portugal
- Coordinates: 38°43′46″N 9°9′1″W
- Owner: Government-owned corporation
- Operator: Metropolitano de Lisboa, EPE
- Line: Blue Line
- Platforms: 2 side platforms
- Tracks: 2

Construction
- Structure type: Underground
- Accessible: No
- Architect: Francisco Keil do Amaral

Other information
- Station code: PA
- Fare zone: L

History
- Opened: 29 December 1959 (66 years ago)
- Rebuilt: 29 December 1994 (31 years ago)

Services
Preceding station	Lisbon Metro	Following station
São Sebastião towards Reboleira	Blue Line	Marquês de Pombal towards Santa Apolónia
Route map
Location

Parque station is part of the Blue Line of the Lisbon Metro.

== History ==
Parque is one of the 11 stations that belong to the original Lisbon Metro network, opened on 29 December 1959.

This station is located on Avenida António Augusto de Aguiar. It takes its name from the nearby Edward VII Park.

The architectural design of the original station is by Francisco Keil do Amaral. On 29 December 1994 the station was refurbished, based on the architectural design of Sanchez Jorge.

== Connections ==
=== Urban buses ===
==== Carris ====
- 726 Sapadores ⇄ Pontinha Centro
- 746 Marquês de Pombal ⇄ Estação Damaia

== See also ==
- List of Lisbon metro stations
