= Jardim Zoológico Station =

Lisbon Metro station

Jardim Zoológico
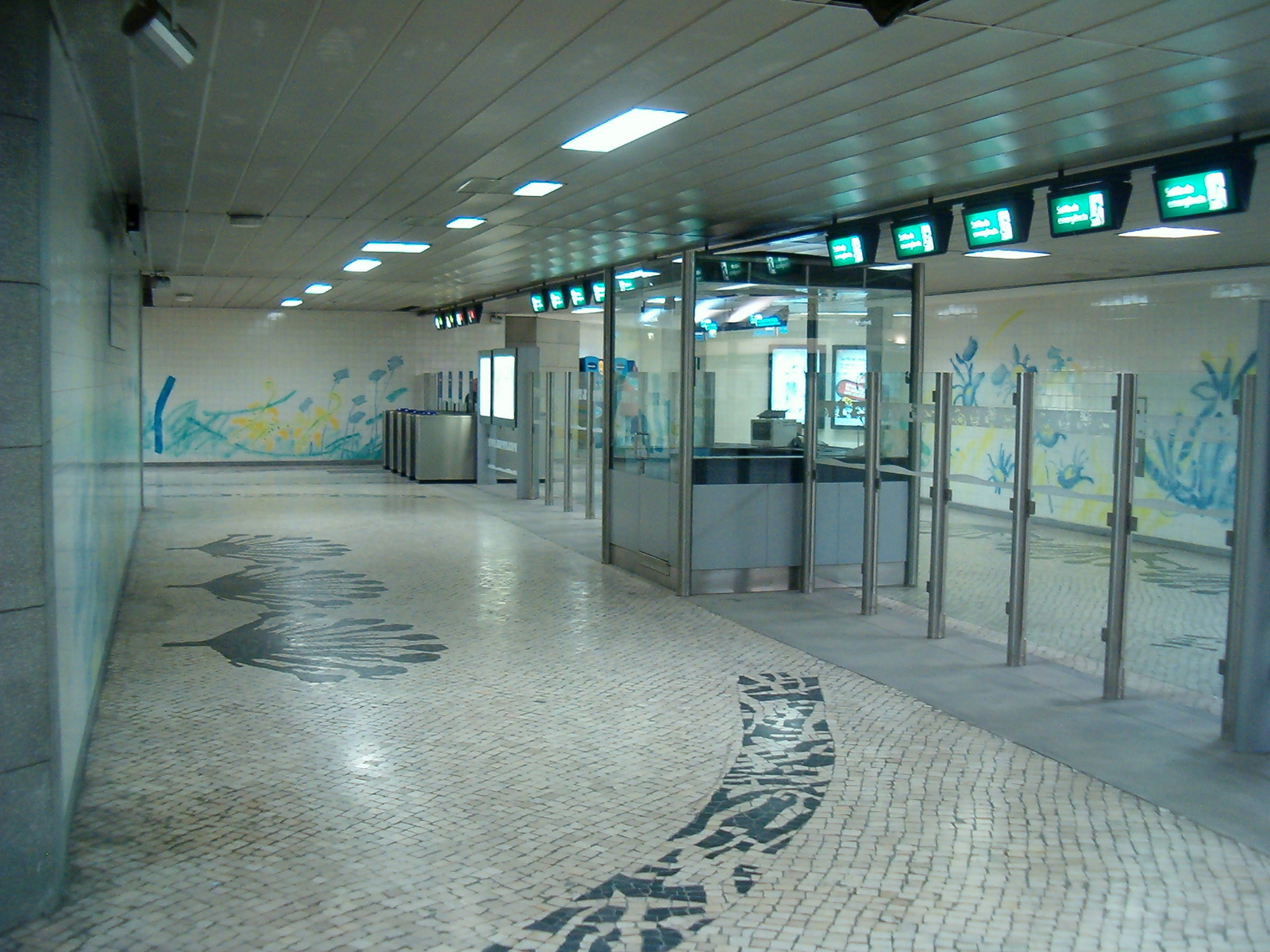

General information
- Location: Praça General Humberto Delgado, Lisbon; Portugal
- Coordinates: 38°44′31″N 9°10′7″W
- Owner: Government-owned corporation
- Operator: Metropolitano de Lisboa, EPE
- Line: Blue Line
- Platforms: 2 side platforms
- Tracks: 2
- Connections: Sete Rios

Construction
- Structure type: Underground
- Accessible: Yes
- Architect: Falcão e Cunha

Other information
- Station code: JZ
- Fare zone: L

History
- Opened: 29 December 1959 (66 years ago)
- Rebuilt: 25 July 1995 (31 years ago)
- Former names: Sete Rios

Services
Preceding station	Lisbon Metro	Following station
Laranjeiras towards Reboleira	Blue Line	Praça de Espanha towards Santa Apolónia
Route map
Location

Jardim Zoológico station is part of the Blue Line of the Lisbon Metro.

== History ==
It is one of the 11 stations that belong to the original Lisbon Metro network, opened on 29 December 1959. This station is located on Praça General Humberto Delgado, connecting to the Sete Rios Railway Station (Sintra and Azambuja Lines) and the Sete Rios Bus terminal. It takes its name from the nearby Lisbon Zoo.

The architectural design of the original station is by Falcão e Cunha. On 25 July 1995 the station was extended and refurbished, based on the architectural design of Benoliel de Carvalho.

== Connections ==
=== Urban buses ===
==== Carris ====
- 701 Campo Grande (Metro) ⇄ Campo de Ourique (Prazeres)
- 716 Alameda D. A. Henriques ⇄ Benfica - Al. Padre Álvaro Proença
- 726 Sapadores ⇄ Pontinha Centro
- 731 Av. José Malhoa ⇄ Moscavide Centro
- 746 Marquês de Pombal ⇄ Estação Damaia
- 754 Campo Pequeno ⇄ Alfragide
- 755 Poço do Bispo ⇄ Sete Rios
- 758 Cais do Sodré ⇄ Portas de Benfica
- 768 Cidade Universitária ⇄ Quinta dos Alcoutins
- 770 Sete Rios - Circulação via Bairro do Calhau / Serafina

==== Aerobus ====
- Linha 2 Aeroporto ⇄ Sete Rios

=== Rail ===
==== Comboios de Portugal ====
- Sintra ⇄ Lisboa - Oriente
- Sintra ⇄ Alverca
- Alcântara-Terra ⇄ Castanheira do Ribatejo
- Lisboa - Santa Apolónia ⇄ Leiria (Regional)
- Lisboa - Santa Apolónia ⇄ Caldas da Rainha (Regional)
- Lisboa - Santa Apolónia ⇄ Torres Vedras (Regional)
- Lisboa - Oriente ⇄ Évora (Intercities)
- Lisboa - Oriente ⇄ Faro (Intercities)

==== Fertagus ====
- Setúbal ⇄ Roma-Areeiro
- Coina ⇄ Roma-Areeiro

== See also ==
- List of Lisbon metro stations
