= Baixa-Chiado Station =

Metro station in Lisbon, Portugal

Baixa-Chiado
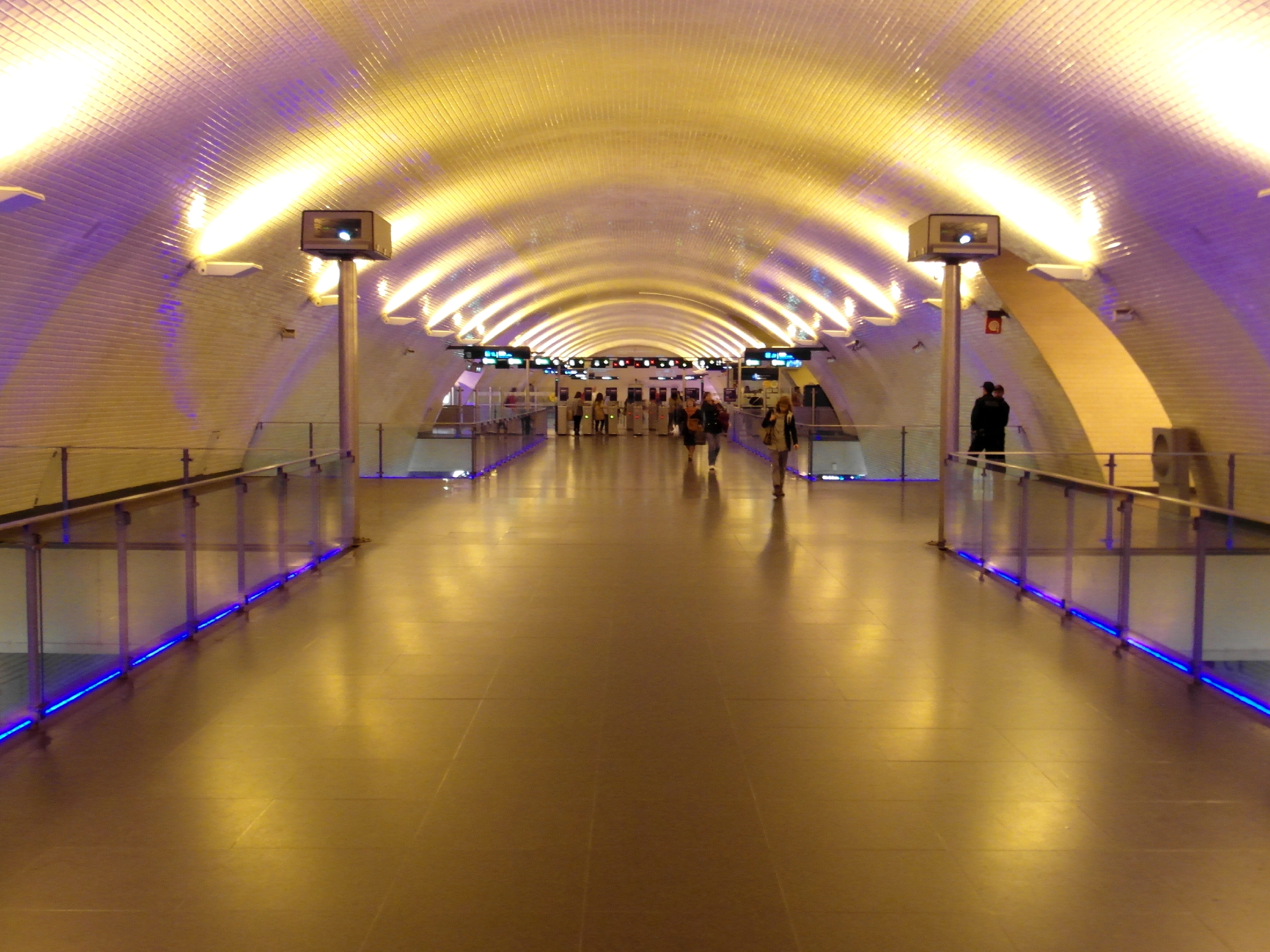

General information
- Location: Largo do Chiado / Rua do Crucifixo, Lisbon; Portugal
- Coordinates: 38°42′38″N 9°8′24″W
- Owner: Government-owned corporation
- Operator: Metropolitano de Lisboa, EPE
- Line: Blue Line Green Line
- Platforms: 4 side platforms
- Tracks: 4

Construction
- Structure type: Underground
- Depth: 45 m (148 ft)
- Accessible: yes
- Architect: Álvaro Siza Vieira

Other information
- Station code: BC
- Fare zone: L

History
- Opened: Green Line: April 25, 1998 (28 years ago); Blue Line: August 8, 1998 (28 years ago)
- Former names: Baixa-Chiado PT Blue Station

Services
Preceding station	Lisbon Metro	Following station
Restauradores towards Reboleira	Blue Line	Terreiro do Paço towards Santa Apolónia
Rossio towards Telheiras	Green Line	Cais do Sodré Terminus
Route map
Location

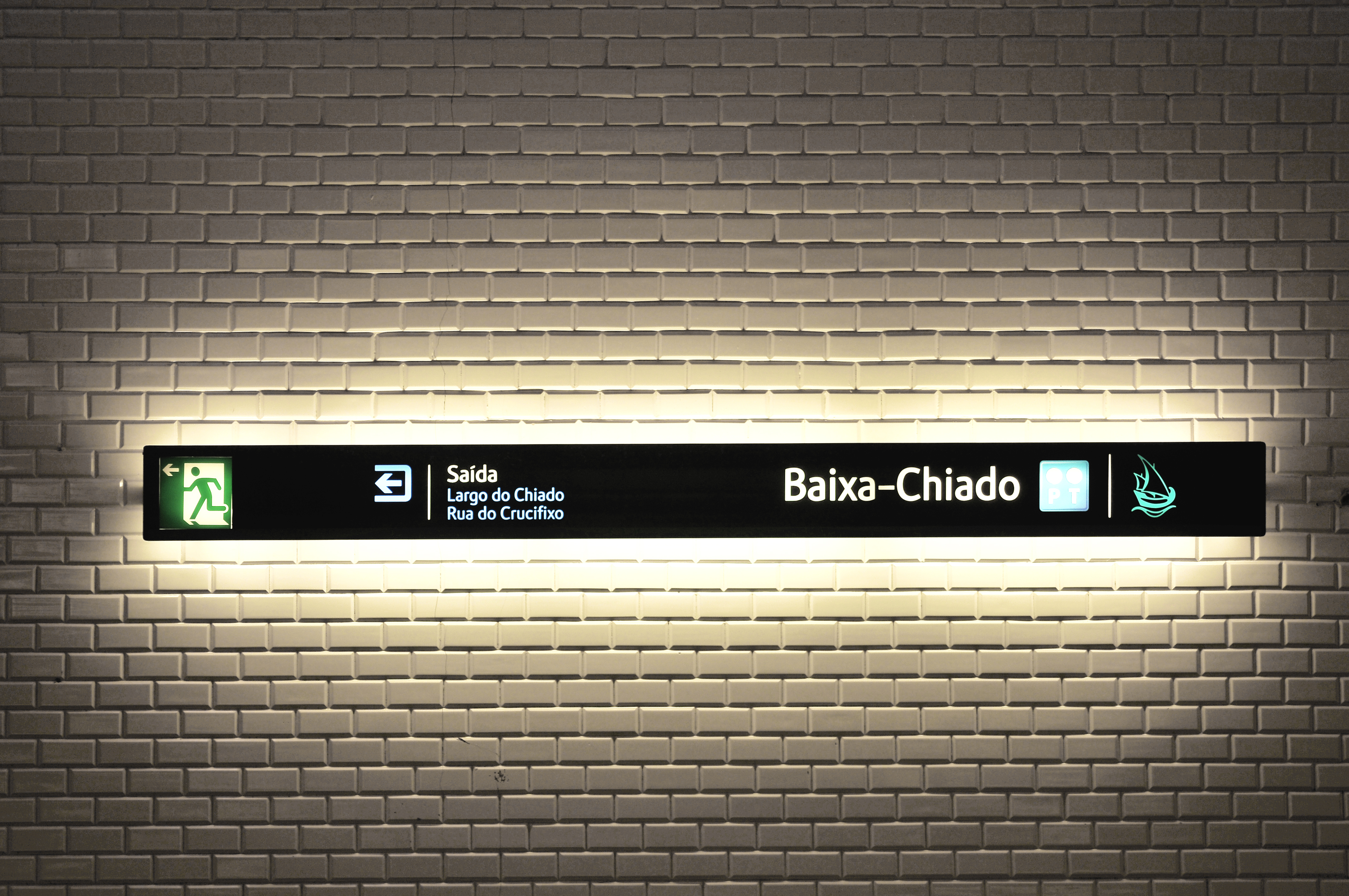
Station sign

Baixa-Chiado is an interchange station where the Blue and Green Lines of the Lisbon Metro connect, being located under Rua Ivens between Baixa and Chiado, hence its name.

== History ==
The station opened on April 25, 1998 with service on the Green Line; the Blue Line platforms opened on August 8, 1998. It was designed by the Pritzker architect Álvaro Siza Vieira.

== Connections ==
=== Urban buses and Interurban buses ===
==== Carris ====
- 28E Martim Moniz ⇄ Campo de Ourique (Prazeres)
- 202 Cais do Sodré ⇄ Bairro Padre Cruz (morning service)
- 711 Terreiro do Paço ⇄ Alto da Damaia
- 736 Cais do Sodré ⇄ Odivelas (Bairro Dr. Lima Pimentel)
- 758 Cais do Sodré ⇄ Portas de Benfica

== See also ==
- List of Lisbon metro stations
