= Lisbon Zoo =

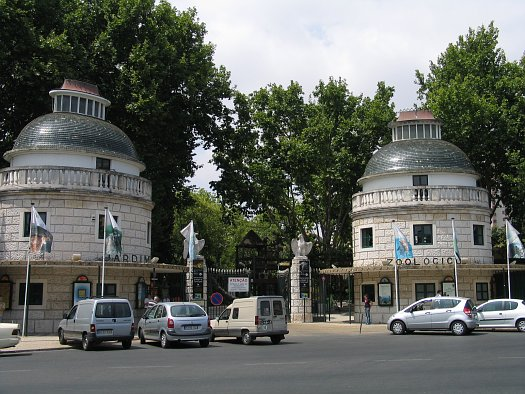
- Main entrance
- Interactive map of Lisbon Zoo
- 38°44.69′N 9°10.29′W
- Date opened: 1884
- Location: Lisbon, Portugal
- No. of animals: 2,000
- No. of species: 300
- Annual visitors: 800,000
- Public transit: Azul at Jardim Zoológico or Laranjeiras
- Website: www.zoo.pt

Lisbon Zoo (Jardim Zoologico de Lisboa) is a zoological garden in Lisbon, Portugal. It was founded in 1884. The zoo was originally located in the park of São Sebastião da Pedreira. The zoo moved once in 1894 and once again in 1905 to its current location at Quinta das Laranjeiras, in Sete Rios.

About 2,000 animals of more than 300 species are represented:

- Approximately
- 114 mammals
- 157 birds
- 56 reptiles
- 5 amphibians and arthropods

The mission of the Lisbon Zoo includes the conservation and breeding of endangered species, as well as scientific research, and educational and recreational activities. About 800,000 people visit the zoo annually.

== History ==
The idea for the creation of a zoo in Lisbon dates back to the year 1882 according to rumors that circulated in the Lisbon press in August of that year. At the time, there was no zoo in the Iberian Peninsula with the responsibility of displaying the exotic flora and fauna of the world, although both Spain and Portugal had hosted menageries before.

The idea for the zoo was solidified by Dr. Van Der Laan, Dr. Sousa Martins, and May Figueira, owner of the largest aviary in the Portugal at the time. Together they decided to form a zoo similar to those already present in France and the Netherlands. Lisbon's prime geographical position helped to facilitate this plan.

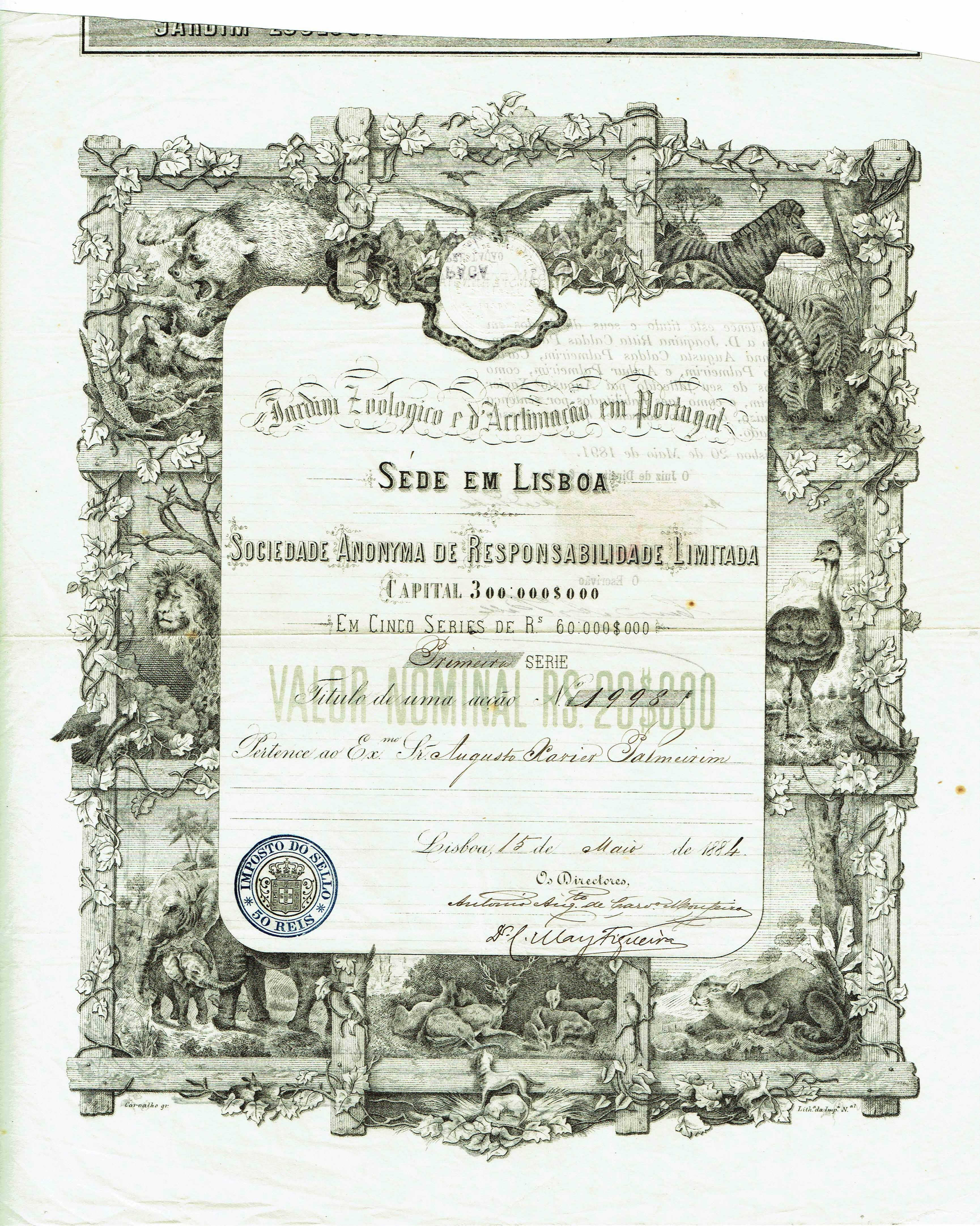
Share of the Lisbon Zoo, issued 15. May 1884

At the end of that year, the group traveled throughout Europe, visiting zoos in various European capitals, and collecting the information needed to facilitate the creation of a zoo in Lisbon.

After their trips it became clear that it would be necessary to search for men to finance the creation of the planned zoo. They recruited the help of civil engineer Lino Bento de Sousa, 2nd Baron of Kessler Frederico Luís Hermano, and even D. Fernando II, along with several others.

On 5 September 1883, after much preparation and financing a deed was prepared for the zoo. After which construction began on the required facilities to operate the zoo.

On 28 May 1884, the Lisbon Zoo was opened to the public. It housed a collection of 1127 animals available for viewing. Some of which were donated by the Portuguese royal family and other dignitaries.

=== Early years ===
The public was enamored with the newly founded zoo. Garnering 170,000 visitors in its inaugural year.

Over the following two years the zoo continued to attract many visitors, but various difficulties, including alleged bad weather, resulted in a drop in the number of visitors. The zoo faced with this issue introduced a new attraction. paid boat trips on the properties lake. With the success of this new attraction the zoo was able to stabilize its revenue.

In 1892, a severe winter season caused damage to multiple areas of the zoo. In the same year two owners of the park, Dr. João António Pinto and D. Maria das Dores Pinto, died. As such the heirs were unable to continue operating the facility at this location.

=== Moving to Palhavã ===
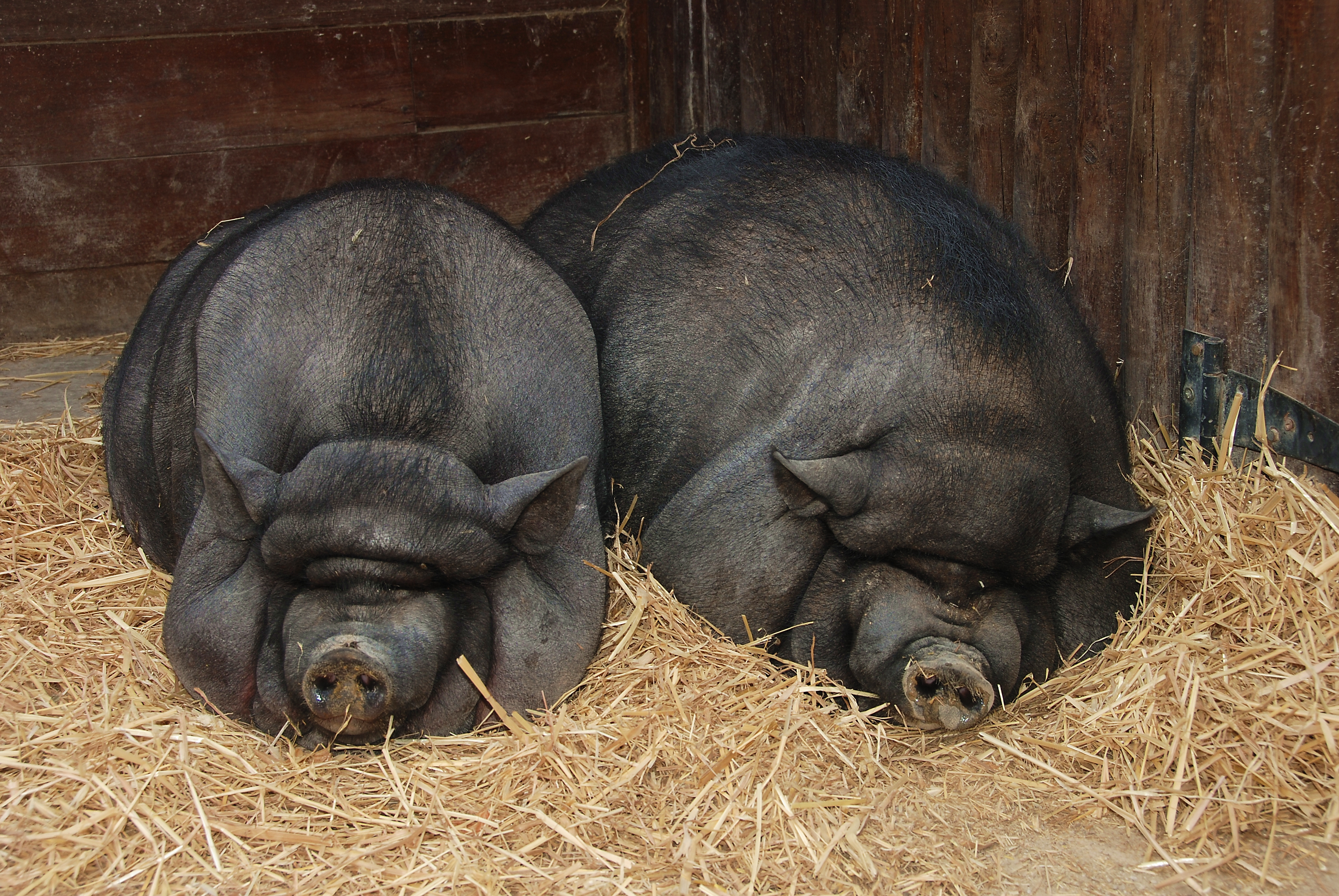
Two pot-bellied pigs sleeping at Lisbon Zoo.

In 1894, the zoo moved to the lands of Palhavã. This new property stood in stark contrast to the beautiful land on which the old zoo had rested, that of which the public had become so accustomed to.

On May 13, 1894, the park reopened. During this period, the zoo began selling and exporting animals, of which it had in excess, in order to balance the park's finances. This process was facilitated by the National Navigation Company which provided free transportation for the animals, and who also helped to bring new species to the zoo.

In 1902, a new tram line was introduced that stopped at the zoo. This addition helped to furthermore increase the number of visitors to the zoo.

=== The Zoo in the 20th Century ===
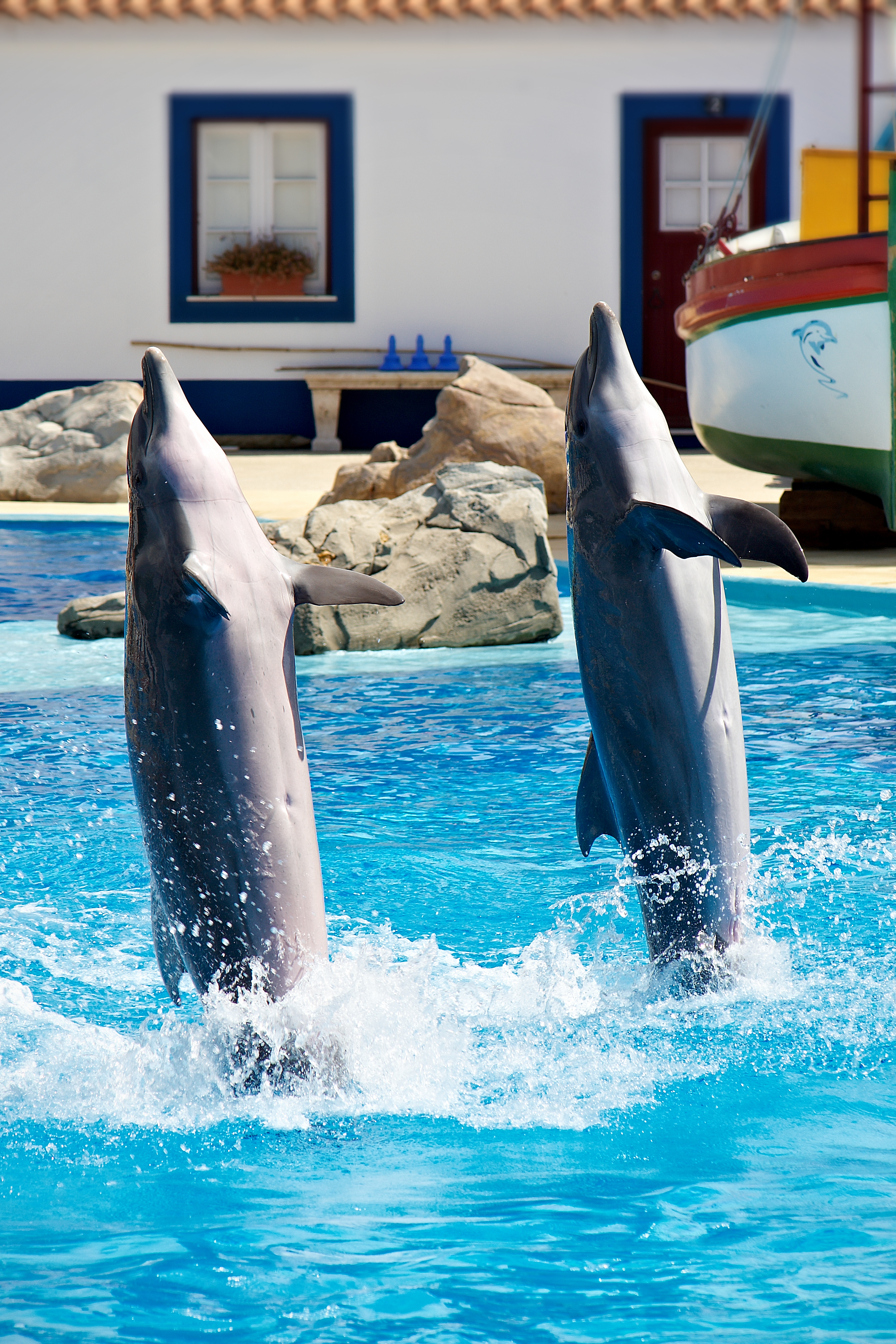
Dolphins performing tricks during a show in Lisbon Zoo

The lease for the land the zoo was situated on ended in 1905. During the preceding months the equipment from the zoo was moved to its new location at Quinta Das Laranjeiras.

In 1912 Lisbon Zoo administration commissioned architect Raul Lino to develop its new gardens and animal facilities further recognizing the importance of its presence in the city.

== Dolphins ==
The park has 7 dolphins: Soda (F), Kobie (F), Victoria (F), Neo (M), Yuky (M), Sado (M) and Ricky (M).
