= Alfornelos Station =

Lisbon Blue Line metro station

Alfornelos
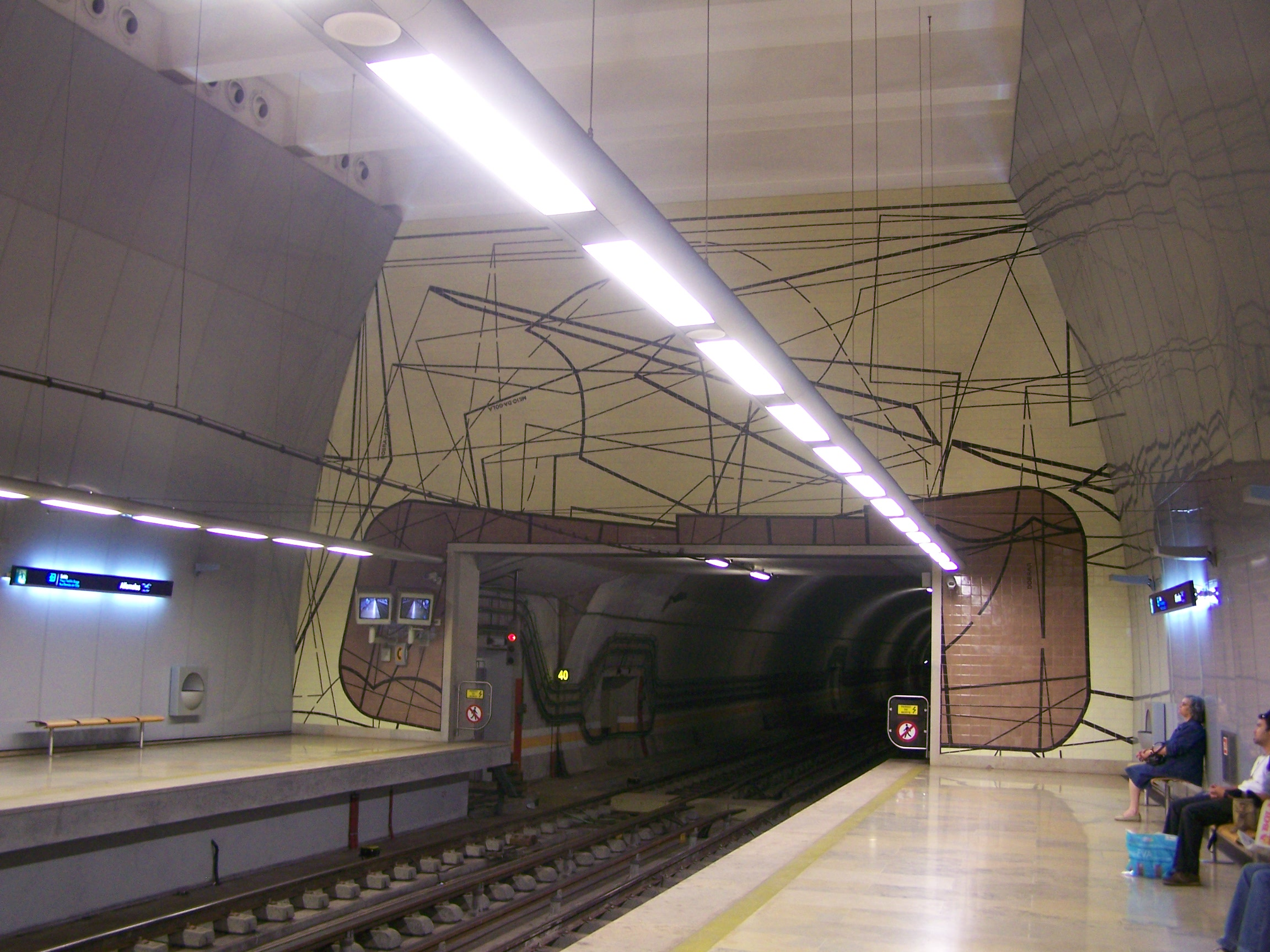

General information
- Location: Praça Teófilo Braga, Amadora; Portugal
- Coordinates: 38°45′38″N 9°12′18″W
- Owner: Government-owned corporation
- Operator: Metropolitano de Lisboa, EPE
- Line: Blue Line
- Platforms: 2 side platforms
- Tracks: 2

Construction
- Structure type: Underground
- Accessible: yes
- Architect: Alberto Barradas

Other information
- Station code: AF
- Fare zone: 1

History
- Opened: 15 May 2004 (22 years ago)

Services
Preceding station	Lisbon Metro	Following station
Amadora Este towards Reboleira	Blue Line	Pontinha towards Santa Apolónia
Route map
Location

Alfornelos station is part of the Blue Line of the Lisbon Metro and is located in the Alfornelos neighbourhood of Amadora.

== History ==
The station opened on 15 May 2004 in conjunction with the Amadora Este station. It is located on Praça Teófilo Braga.

The architectural design of the station is by Alberto Barradas.

== Connections ==
=== Suburban buses ===
==== Vimeca / Lisboa Transportes ====
- 128 Casal da Mira (Dolce Vita Tejo) ↔ Lisboa (Colégio Militar)
- 143 Amadora (Estação Norte) ↔ Pontinha (Estação)
- 155 Amadora (Hospital) - Circulação

== See also ==
- List of Lisbon metro stations
