= Amadora Este Station =

Metro station in Amadora, Portugal

Amadora Este
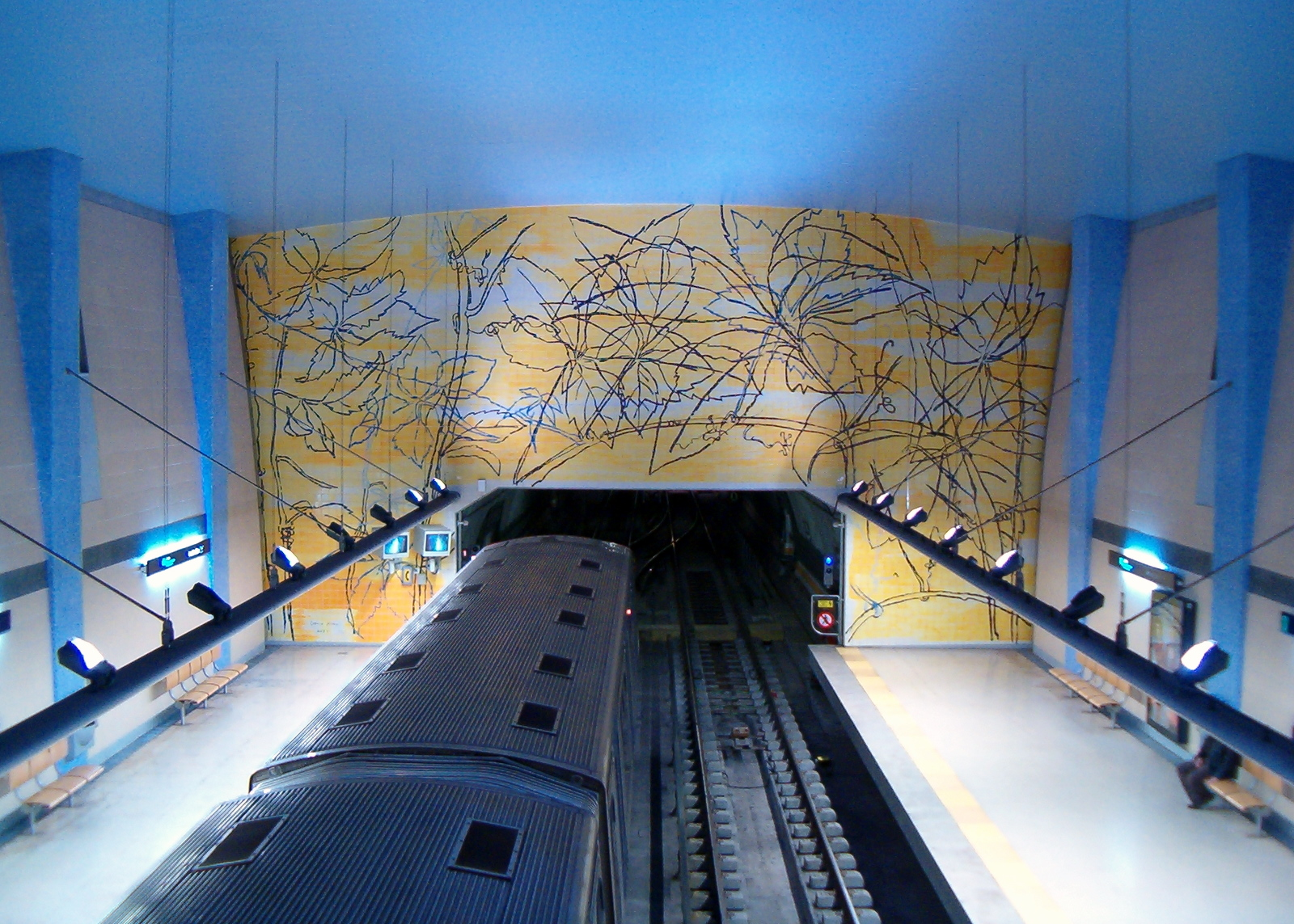

General information
- Location: Praça São Silvestre, Amadora; Portugal
- Coordinates: 38°45′28″N 9°13′05″W
- Owner: Government-owned corporation
- Operator: Metropolitano de Lisboa, EPE
- Line: Blue Line
- Platforms: 2 side platforms
- Tracks: 2

Construction
- Structure type: Underground
- Accessible: yes
- Architect: Leopoldo de Almeida Rosa

Other information
- Station code: AS
- Fare zone: 1

History
- Opened: 15 May 2004 (22 years ago)

Services
Preceding station	Lisbon Metro	Following station
Reboleira Terminus	Blue Line	Alfornelos towards Santa Apolónia
Route map
Location

Amadora Este station is part of the Blue Line of the Lisbon Metro and is located on the east side of Amadora.

== History ==
The station opened on 15 May 2004 in conjunction with the Alfornelos station, and it is located on Praça São Silvestre. Built over it is an important bus terminal.

The architectural design of the station is by Leopoldo de Almeida Rosa.

== Connections ==
=== Suburban Buses ===
==== Vimeca / Lisboa Transportes ====
- 101 Lisboa (Colégio Militar) ⇄ Tercena
- 104 Almargem do Bispo ⇄ Falagueira (Estação)
- 106 Falagueira (Estação) ⇄ Carcavelos (Praia)
- 132 A-da-Beja (Largo) ⇄ Lisboa (Colégio Militar)
- 142 Casal da Mira (Dolce Vita Tejo) ↔ Lisboa (Colégio Militar)
- 154 Amadora (Hospital) - Circulação
- 155 Amadora (Hospital) - Circulação
- 162 Algés (Estação) ⇄ Falagueira (Estação)
- 163 Lisboa (Colégio Militar) ⇄ Massamá (Casal do Olival)
- 186 Amadora (Hospital) ⇄ Falagueira (Estação)
- 189 Amadora (Estação Sul) ⇄ Falagueira (Estação)

== See also ==
- List of Lisbon metro stations
