= Rossio Station =

Metro station in Lisbon, Portugal

Coordinates: 38.7138°N 9.1390°W

Rossio
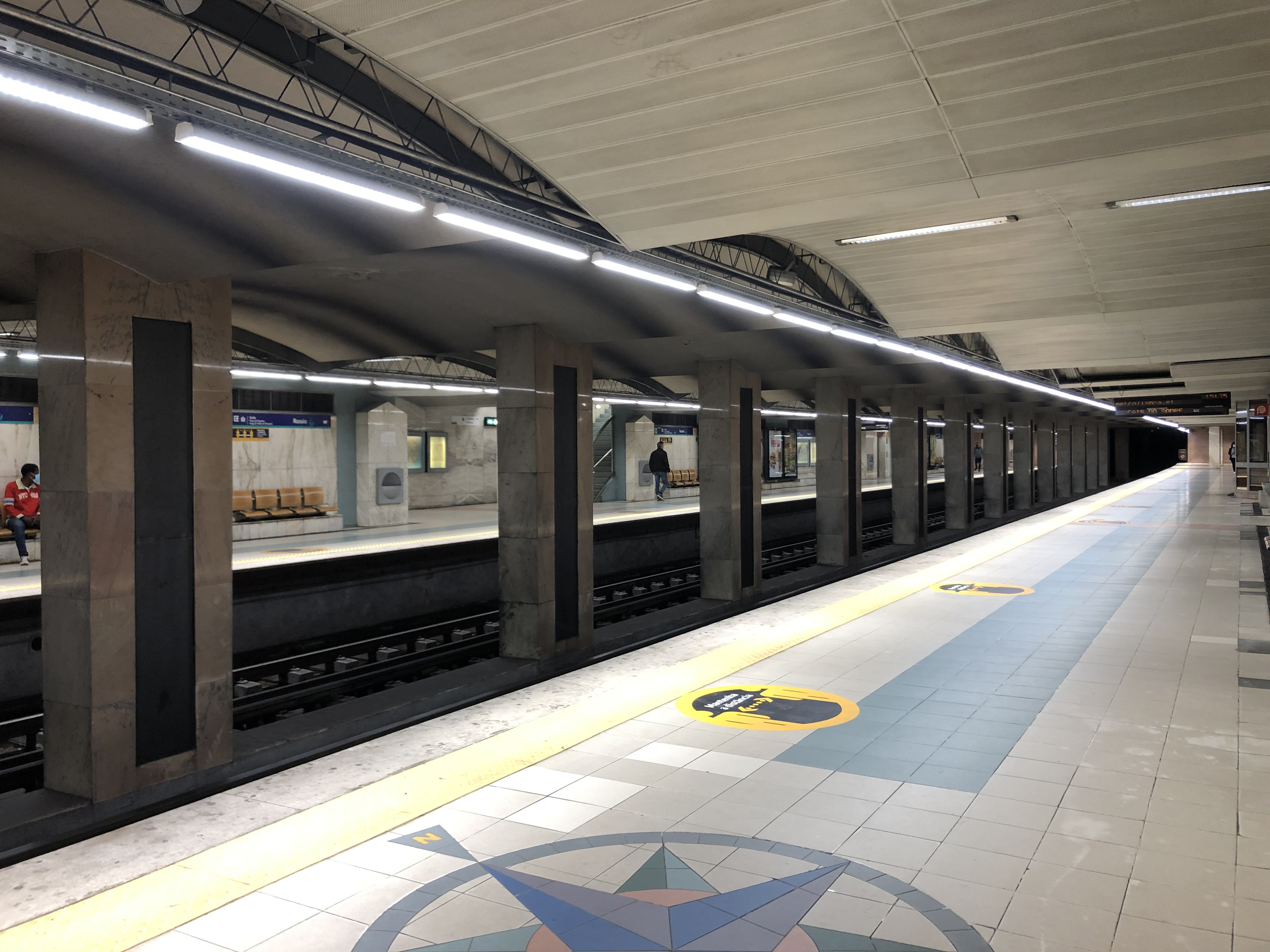

General information
- Location: Praça da Figueira, Lisbon; Portugal
- Owner: Government-owned corporation
- Operator: Metropolitano de Lisboa, EPE
- Line: Green Line
- Platforms: 2 side platforms
- Tracks: 2

Construction
- Structure type: Underground
- Accessible: Yes
- Architect: Falcão e Cunha

Other information
- Station code: RO
- Fare zone: L

History
- Opened: 27 January 1963 (63 years ago)

Services
Preceding station	Lisbon Metro	Following station
Martim Moniz towards Telheiras	Green Line	Baixa-Chiado towards Cais do Sodré
Route map
Location

Rossio is a station on the Green Line of the Lisbon Metro. The station is located between Figueira Square and Rossio Square from which it takes its name.

== History ==
The original station was designed by the architect Falcão e Cunha with art installations by the painter Maria Keil.

== Connections ==
=== Urban buses ===
==== Carris ====
- 12E Praça da Figueira - circulação
- 15E Praça da Figueira ⇄ Algés
- 25E Campo de Ourique ⇄ Praça da Figueira
- 207 Cais do Sodré ⇄ Fetais (morning service)
- 208 Cais do Sodré ⇄ Estação Oriente (Interface) (morning service)
- 711 Terreiro do Paço ⇄ Alto da Damaia
- 714 Praça da Figueira ⇄ Outurela
- 732 Marquês de Pombal ⇄ Caselas
- 736 Cais do Sodré ⇄ Odivelas (Bairro Dr. Lima Pimentel)
- 737 Praça da Figueira ⇄ Castelo
- 760 Gomes Freire ⇄ Cemitério da Ajuda

==== Aerobus ====
- Linha 1 Aeroporto ⇄ Cais do Sodré

== See also ==
- List of Lisbon metro stations
