= Terreiro do Paço Station =

Metro station in Lisbon, Portugal

Terreiro do Paço
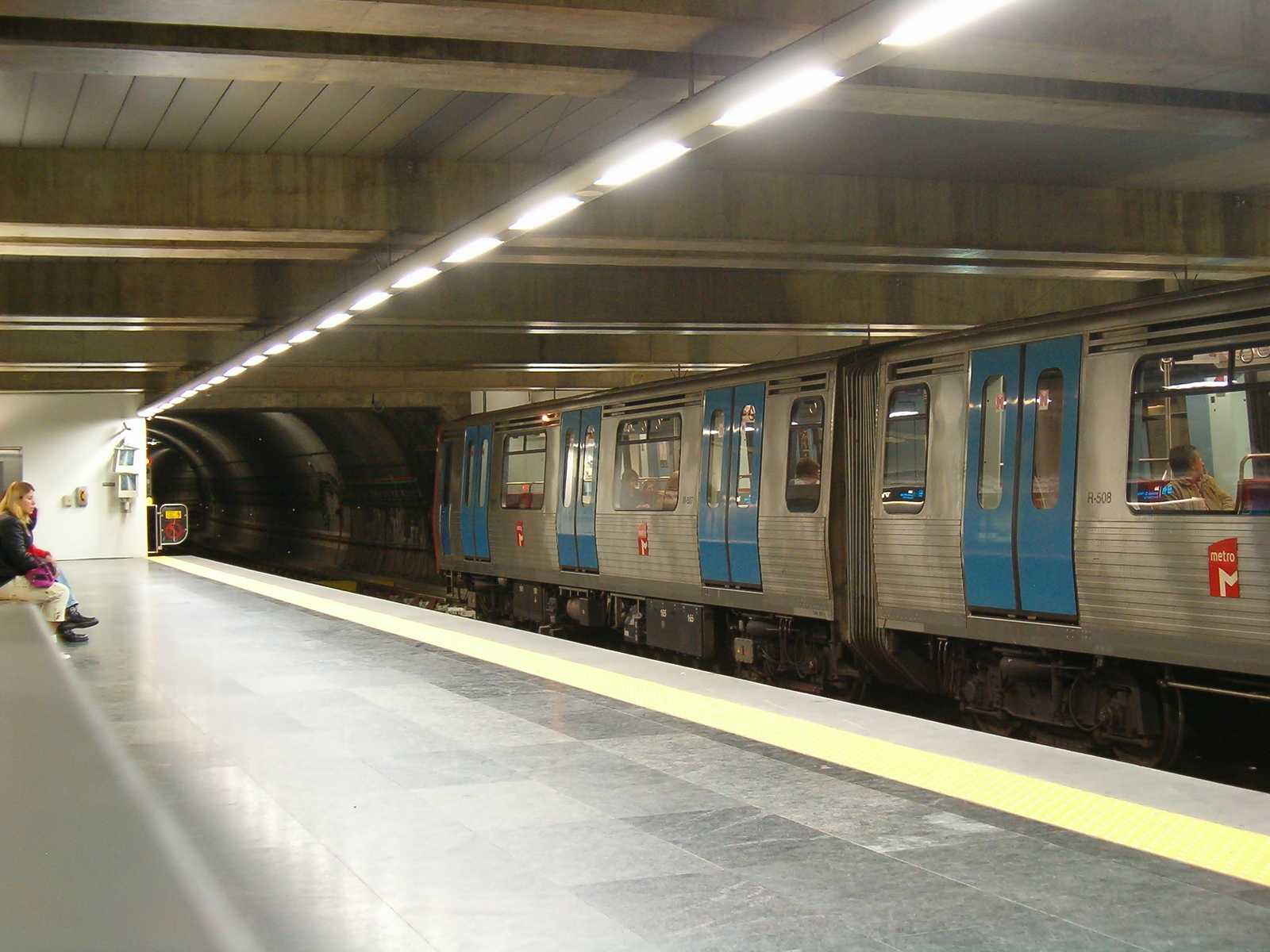

General information
- Location: Praça do Comércio, Lisbon; Portugal
- Coordinates: 38°42′24″N 9°8′7″W
- Owner: Government-owned corporation
- Operator: Metropolitano de Lisboa, EPE
- Line: Blue Line
- Platforms: 2 side platforms
- Tracks: 2
- Connections: Terreiro do Paço

Construction
- Structure type: Underground
- Accessible: yes
- Architect: Artur Rosa

Other information
- Station code: TP
- Fare zone: L

History
- Opened: December 19, 2007 (18 years ago)

Services
Preceding station	Lisbon Metro	Following station
Baixa-Chiado towards Reboleira	Blue Line	Santa Apolónia Terminus
Route map
Location

Terreiro do Paço station is part of the Blue Line of the Lisbon Metro.

== History ==
Opened on December 19, 2007, in conjunction with the Santa Apolónia station, and it is located on Praça do Comércio. It takes its name (literally 'Palace Square') from the adjacent Terreiro do Paço square.

The architectural design of station is by Artur Rosa. This station won both the Valmor and Municipal Architecture prizes in 2008

== Connections ==
=== Urban buses ===
==== Carris ====
- 15E Praça da Figueira ⇄ Algés
- 25E Campo de Ourique ⇄ Praça da Figueira
- 206 Cais do Sodré ⇄ Bairro Padre Cruz (morning service)
- 207 Cais do Sodré ⇄ Fetais (morning service)
- 208 Cais do Sodré ⇄ Estação Oriente (Interface) (morning service)
- 210 Cais do Sodré ⇄ Prior Velho (morning service)
- 711 Terreiro do Paço ⇄ Alto da Damaia
- 714 Praça da Figueira ⇄ Outurela
- 728 Restelo - Av. das Descobertas ⇄ Portela - Av. dos Descobrimentos
- 732 Marquês de Pombal ⇄ Caselas
- 735 Cais do Sodré ⇄ Hospital de Santa Maria
- 736 Cais do Sodré ⇄ Odivelas (Bairro Dr. Lima Pimentel)
- 760 Gomes Freire ⇄ Cemitério da Ajuda
- 774 Campo de Ourique (Prazeres) ⇄ Gomes Freire
- 781 Cais do Sodré ⇄ Prior Velho
- 782 Cais do Sodré ⇄ Praça José Queirós

=== Boat ===
==== Soflusa ====
- Terreiro do Paço ⇄ Barreiro

== See also ==
- List of Lisbon metro stations
