= List of Lisbon metro stations =

This is a list of the stations of the metro system in Lisbon, Portugal for the Lisbon Metro.

== List of stations ==
- * Transfer station
- † Terminal
- ‡ Transfer station and terminal

Lisbon Metro stations
Abbr.	Name	Other names	Line	Mun.	Opened	Station	2nd concourse	Lat.	Long.	Alt.	Depth
AP	Aeroporto †	—	Red Line	Lisbon	2012.07.17	central concourse		38° 46′ 07″ N	9° 07′ 43″ W	90 m	−45,5 m
AM	Alameda*	Alameda I (techn.)	Green Line	Lisbon	1972.06.18	1 concourse (N)	—	38° 44′ 00″ N	9° 07′ 01″ W	60 m	?
AM	Alameda*	Alameda II (techn.)	Red Line	Lisbon	1998.05.19	central concourse		38° 44′ 00″ N	9° 08′ 00″ W	61 m	?
AF	Alfornelos	—	Blue Line	Amadora	2004.05.15	central concourse		38° 45′ 37″ N	9° 12′ 18″ W	75 m	?
AH	Alto dos Moinhos	Centro Administrativo (proj.)	Blue Line	Lisbon	1988.10.14	central concourse		38° 44′ 58″ N	9° 10′ 46″ W	99 m	?
AL	Alvalade	—	Green Line	Lisbon	1972.06.18	2 concourses	2006.08.17 (S)	38° 45′ 12″ N	9° 08′ 38″ W	80 m	?
AS	Amadora Este	Falagueira (proj.)	Blue Line	Amadora	2004.05.15	central concourse		38° 45′ 28″ N	9° 13′ 05″ W	95 m	?
AX	Ameixoeira	Carriche (proj.)	Yellow Line	Lisbon	2004.03.27	central concourse		38° 46′ 45″ N	9° 09′ 36″ W	90 m	?
AN	Anjos	—	Green Line	Lisbon	1966.09.28	2 concourses	1982.11.15 (N)	38° 43′ 34″ N	9° 08′ 05″ W	45 m	?
AE	Areeiro	—	Green Line	Lisbon	1972.06.18	2 concourses	2013.11.17 (S)	38° 44′ 32″ N	9° 08′ 03″ W	75 m	?
AR	Arroios	—	Green Line	Lisbon	1972.06.18	2 concourses	—	38° 43′ 59″ N	9° 08′ 02″ W	55 m	?
AV	Avenida	—	Blue Line	Lisbon	1959.12.29	2 concourses	1982.11.09 (S)	38° 43′ 12″ N	9° 08′ 45″ W	30 m	?
BC	Baixa-Chiado*	Baixa-Chiado I (techn.)	Green Line	Lisbon	1998.04.25	central concourse		38° 42′ 00″ N	9° 08′ 00″ W	35 m	−45 m
BC	Baixa-Chiado*	Baixa-Chiado II (techn.)	Blue Line	Lisbon	1998.08.08	central concourse		38° 42′ 00″ N	9° 08′ 00″ W	35 m	−45 m
BV	Bela Vista	Vale de Chelas (proj.); Chelas (proj.)	Red Line	Lisbon	1998.05.19	central concourse		38° 44′ 48″ N	9° 07′ 01″ W	50 m	?
CR	Cabo Ruivo	Olivais Velho (proj.)	Red Line	Lisbon	1998.07.18	central concourse		38° 45′ 45″ N	9° 06′ 14″ W	30 m	?
CS	Cais do Sodré †	—	Green Line	Lisbon	1998.04.18	1 concourse (E)	—	38° 42′ 19″ N	9° 08′ 33″ W	2 m	?
CG	Campo Grande*	Campo Grande II (techn.)	Yellow Line	Lisbon	1993.04.03	central concourse		38° 45′ 36″ N	9° 09′ 28″ W	80 m	20 m
CG	Campo Grande*	Campo Grande I (techn.)	Green Line	Lisbon	1993.04.03	central concourse		38° 45′ 36″ N	9° 09′ 28″ W	80 m	20 m
CP	Campo Pequeno	—	Yellow Line	Lisbon	1959.12.29	2 concourses	1979.04.26 (S)	38° 44′ 29″ N	9° 08′ 48″ W	75 m	?
CA	Carnide	—	Blue Line	Lisbon	1997.10.18	central concourse		38° 45′ 31″ N	9° 11′ 33″ W	83 m	−10 m
CH	Chelas	Armador (proj.)	Red Line	Lisbon	1998.05.19	central concourse		38° 45′ 15″ N	9° 06′ 49″ W	60 m	?
CU	Cidade Universitária	—	Yellow Line	Lisbon	1988.10.14	central concourse		38° 45′ 06″ N	9° 09′ 31″ W	75 m	?
CM	Colégio Militar/Luz	Luz (proj.); Estrada da Luz (proj.)	Blue Line	Lisbon	1988.10.14	central concourse		38° 45′ 09″ N	9° 11′ 19″ W	78 m	?
EN	Encarnação	—	Red Line	Lisbon	2012.07.17	central concourse		38° 46′ 31″ N	9° 06′ 08″ W	70 m	?
EC	Entre Campos	—	Yellow Line	Lisbon	1959.12.29	2 concourses	1973.07.15 (S)	38° 44′ 52″ N	9° 08′ 55″ W	75 m	?
IN	Intendente	—	Green Line	Lisbon	1966.09.28	2 concourses	1977.03.07 (N)	38° 43′ 21″ N	9° 08′ 06″ W	35 m	?
JZ	Jardim Zoológico	Sete Rios (until 1998.03.01)	Blue Line	Lisbon	1959.12.29	2 concourses	1995.07.25 (S)	38° 44′ 31″ N	9° 10′ 07″ W	60 m	?
LA	Laranjeiras	—	Blue Line	Lisbon	1988.10.14	central concourse		38° 44′ 53″ N	9° 10′ 19″ W	75 m	?
LU	Lumiar	—	Yellow Line	Lisbon	2004.03.27	2 concourses	—	38° 46′ 22″ N	9° 09′ 35″ W	85 m	?
MP	Marquês de Pombal*	Rotunda I (techn. until 1998.03.01); Marquês de Pombal I (techn.)	Blue Line	Lisbon	1959.12.29	2 concourses	—	38° 43′ 27″ N	9° 08′ 57″ W	50 m	?
MP	Marquês de Pombal*	Rotunda II (techn. until 1998.03.01); Marquês de Pombal II (techn.)	Yellow Line	Lisbon	1995.07.15	central concourse		38° 43′ 29.20″ N	9° 09′ 97″ W	50 m	?
MM	Martim Moniz	Socorro (until 1998.03.01)	Green Line	Lisbon	1966.09.26	1 concourse (S)	—	38° 43′ 01″ N	9° 08′ 08″ W	15 m	?
MO	Moscavide	—	Red Line	Lisbon	2012.07.17	central concourse		38° 46′ 30″ N	9° 06′ 09″ W	20 m	?
OD	Odivelas †	—	Yellow Line	Odivelas	2004.03.27	central concourse		38° 47′ 35″ N	9° 10′ 22″ W	20 m	?
OL	Olaias	—	Red Line	Lisbon	1998.05.19	central concourse		38° 44′ 21″ N	9° 07′ 26″ W	75 m	?
OS	Olivais	Olivais Sul (proj.)	Red Line	Lisbon	1998.11.07	central concourse		38° 45′ 36″ N	9° 06′ 44″ W	65 m	−36 m
OR	Oriente	—	Red Line	Lisbon	1998.05.19	central concourse		38° 46′ 02″ N	9° 06′ 01″ W	5 m	?
PA	Parque	—	Blue Line	Lisbon	1959.12.29	1 concourse (N)	—	38° 43′ 45″ N	9° 09′ 00″ W	90 m	?
PI	Picoas	—	Yellow Line	Lisbon	1959.12.29	2 concourses	1982.11.09 (S)	38° 43′ 51″ N	9° 08′ 49″ W	65 m	?
PO	Pontinha	—	Blue Line	Lisbon	1997.10.18	central concourse		38° 45′ 41″ N	9° 11′ 48″ W	85 m	?
PE	Praça de Espanha	Palhavã (until 1998.03.01)	Blue Line	Lisbon	1959.12.29	2 concourses	1980.10.15 (N)	38° 44′ 14″ N	9° 09′ 34″ W	65 m	?
QC	Quinta das Conchas	Quinta do Lambert (proj.); Quinta das Mouras (proj.)	Yellow Line	Lisbon	2004.03.27	2 concourses	—	38° 46′ 01″ N	9° 09′ 20″ W	85 m	?
RA	Rato †	—	Yellow Line	Lisbon	1997.12.29	central concourse		38° 43′ 11″ N	9° 09′ 20″ W	65 m	?
RB	Reboleira †	Amadora Sul (proj.)	Blue Line	Amadora	2016.04.13	central concourse		38° 45′ 08″ N	9° 13′ 29″ W	99 m	?
RE	Restauradores	—	Blue Line	Lisbon	1959.12.29	2 concourses	1977.02.11 (N)	38° 42′ 54″ N	9° 08′ 29″ W	15 m	?
RM	Roma	—	Green Line	Lisbon	1972.06.18	2 concourses	2006.04.12 (S)	38° 44′ 56″ N	9° 08′ 29″ W	80 m	?
RO	Rossio	—	Green Line	Lisbon	1963.01.27	central concourse		38° 42′ 49″ N	9° 08′ 17″ W	15 m	?
SA	Saldanha*	Saldanha I (techn.)	Yellow Line	Lisbon	1959.12.29	2 concourses	1977.03.14 (N)	38° 44′ 06″ N	9° 08′ 42″ W	81 m	?
SA	Saldanha*	Saldanha II (techn.)	Red Line	Lisbon	2009.08.29	2 concourses	—	38° 44′ 07″ N	9° 08′ 39″ W	81 m	?
SP	Santa Apolónia †	—	Blue Line	Lisbon	2007.12.19	central concourse		38° 42′ 45″ N	9° 07′ 24″ W	2 m	?
SS	São Sebastião ‡	São Sebastião I (techn.)	Blue Line	Lisbon	1959.12.29	2 concourses	1977.04.18 (S)	38° 44′ 03″ N	9° 09′ 13″ W	90 m	?
SS	São Sebastião ‡	São Sebastião II (techn.)	Red Line	Lisbon	2009.08.29	2 concourses	—	38° 44′ 06″ N	9° 09′ 08″ W	90 m	−59,6 m
SR	Senhor Roubado	Malaposta (proj.)	Yellow Line	Odivelas	2004.03.27	central concourse		38° 47′ 08″ N	9° 10′ 16″ W	25 m	?
TE	Telheiras †	—	Green Line	Lisbon	2002.11.02	central concourse		38° 45′ 38″ N	9° 09′ 54″ W	92 m	?
TP	Terreiro do Paço	—	Blue Line	Lisbon	2007.12.19	central concourse		38° 42′ 23″ N	9° 08′ 07″ W	2 m	?
Abbr.	Name	Other names	Line	Mun.	Opened	Station	2nd concourse	Lat.	Long.	Alt.	Depth
