= Lisbon Metro Blue Line =

Lisbon Metro line

Blue Line
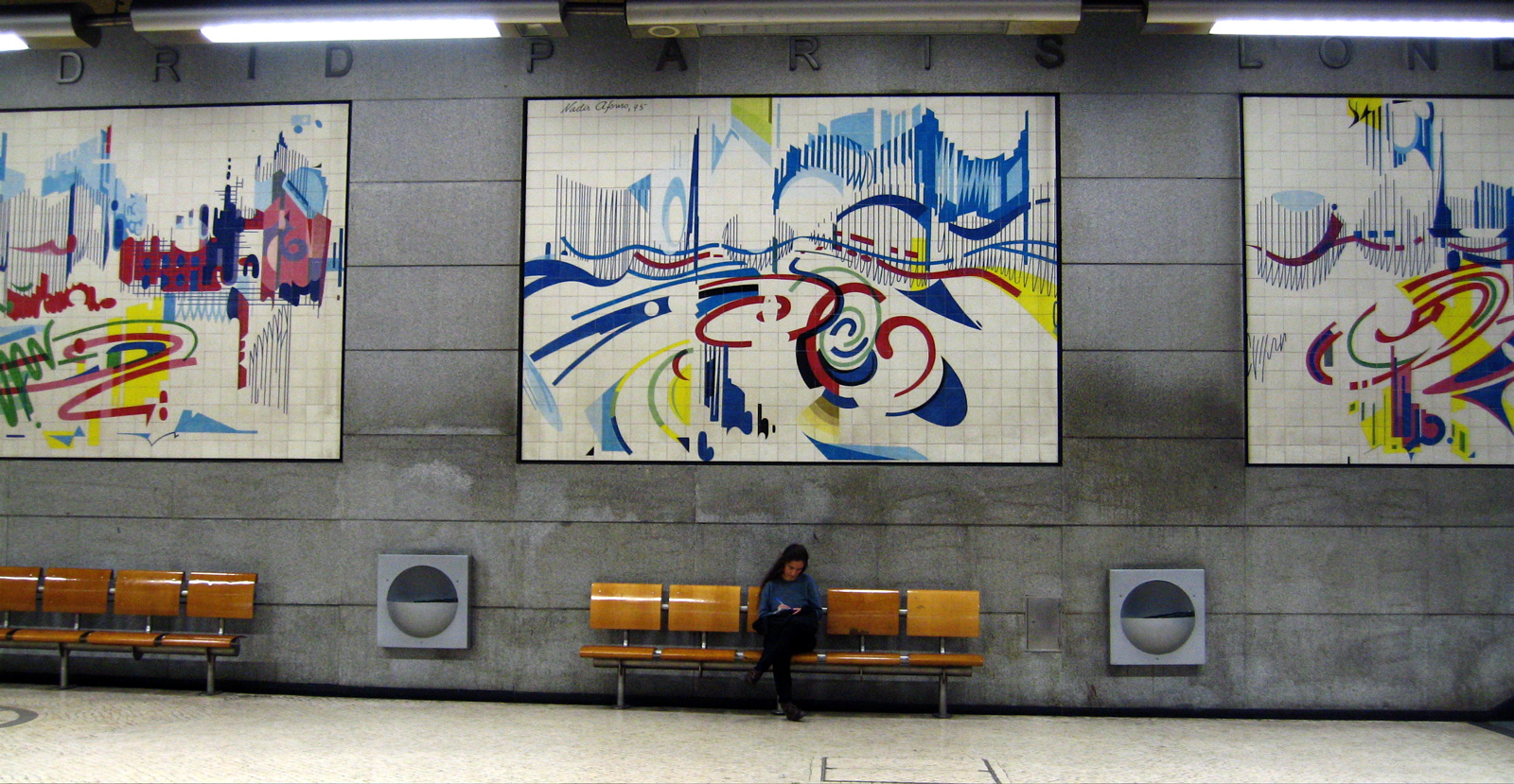
- Lisbon metro station Restauradores

Overview
- Other name: Seagull Line
- Native name: Linha Azul
- Owner: Government-owned corporation
- Locale: Lisbon, Portugal
- Termini: Reboleira; Santa Apolónia
- Connecting lines: Yellow Line Red Line Green Line
- Stations: 18

Service
- Type: Rapid Transit
- System: Metropolitano de Lisboa
- Operator(s): Metropolitano de Lisboa, EPE
- Rolling stock: ML90, ML95, ML97, ML99

History
- Opened: 29 December 1959 (66 years ago)
- Last extension: 2016

Technical
- Line length: 14 km (8.7 mi)
- Character: Underground subway
- Track gauge: 1,435 mm (4 ft 8 1/2 in) standard gauge
- Electrification: 750 V DC third rail
Route map
Topographic map

The Blue Line (Portuguese: Linha Azul) or Seagull Line (Portuguese: Linha da Gaivota) is one of the four lines of Lisbon Metro. It is the only line of the Lisbon Metro entirely underground, without any viaduct.

== Stations ==
Code	Station name	Distance (km)		Transfers	Location	
Code	Station name	Inter- station	Total	Transfers	Location	
SP	Santa Apolónia	—N/a	0.0	Azambuja Line (Santa Apolónia)	São Vicente	Lisbon
TP	Terreiro do Paço	1.1	1.1	Soflusa	Santa Maria Maior	Lisbon
BC	Baixa-Chiado	0.9	2.0	Green Line	Santa Maria Maior	Lisbon
RE	Restauradores	0.7	2.7	Sintra Line (Rossio)	Santa Maria Maior	Lisbon
AV	Avenida	0.5	3.2		Santo António	Lisbon
MP	Marquês de Pombal	0.6	3.8	Yellow Line; Rotunda bus terminal	Santo António	Lisbon
PA	Parque	0.6	4.4		Avenidas Novas	Lisbon
SS	São Sebastião	0.7	5.1	Red Line	Avenidas Novas	Lisbon
PE	Praça de Espanha	0.7	5.8		Campolide	Lisbon
JZ	Jardim Zoológico	0.8	6.6	Azambuja Line/Sintra Line/Fertagus (Sete Rios); Sete Rios bus terminal	São Domingos de Benfica	Lisbon
LA	Laranjeiras	1.1	7.7		São Domingos de Benfica	Lisbon
AH	Alto dos Moinhos	0.6	8.3		São Domingos de Benfica	Lisbon
CM	Colégio Militar/Luz	0.8	9.1	Luz bus terminal	Carnide	Lisbon
CA	Carnide	0.9	10.0		Carnide	Lisbon
PO	Pontinha	0.7	10.7	Pontinha bus terminal	Carnide	Lisbon
AF	Alfornelos	0.9	11.6		Encosta do Sol	Amadora
AS	Amadora Este	1.2	12.8	Amadora bus terminal	Falagueira-Venda Nova	Amadora
RB	Reboleira	0.9	13.7	Sintra Line (Reboleira); Reboleira bus terminal	Falagueira-Venda Nova	Amadora

== Frequency ==
	Summer timetable		Winter timetable	
	Time	Headway	Time	Headway
Working days	06:30 - 07:00 07:00 - 07:30 07:30 - 09:30 09:30 - 10:00 10:00 - 16:30 16:30 - 19:00 19:00 - 20:00 20:00 - 20:30 20:30 - 22:30 22:30 - 01:05	07' 30' 06' 45' 05' 45' 06' 15' 07' 25' 05' 45' 06' 45' 07' 25' 08' 05' 10' 45'	06:30 - 07:00 07:00 - 07:30 07:30 - 09:30 09:30 - 10:00 10:00 - 16:30 16:30 - 19:00 19:00 - 20:00 20:00 - 20:30 20:30 - 21:00 21:00 - 21:30 21:30 - 22:30 22:30 - 01:05	07' 30' 06' 10' 04' 55' 05' 15' 06' 40' 05' 15' 06' 10' 06' 40' 07' 20' 08' 15' 08' 05' 10' 45'
Weekends and holidays	06:30 - 08:30 08:30 - 09:30 09:30 - 10:30 10:30 - 11:30 11:30 - 19:30 19:30 - 22:30 22:30 - 01:05	08' 00' 08' 05' 08' 00' 08' 05' 08' 10' 08' 00' 10' 40'	06:30 - 08:30 08:30 - 09:30 09:30 - 10:30 10:30 - 11:30 11:30 - 19:30 19:30 - 22:30 22:30 - 01:05	08' 00' 08' 05' 08' 00' 08' 05' 08' 10' 08' 00' 10' 40'

== Chronology ==
- 29 December 1959: Opening of the original Lisbon Metro network with a Y shape. Common branch stations: Restauradores, Avenida, Rotunda (former name of the Marquês de Pombal station and where the line would split into the two branches). Current Blue Line branch stations (coming from Rotunda station): Parque, São Sebastião, Palhavã (former name of the Praça de Espanha station) and Sete Rios (former name of the Jardim Zoológico station). Current Yellow Line branch stations (coming from Rotunda station): Picoas, Saldanha, Campo Pequeno and Entre Campos.
- 27 January 1963: Opening of the Rossio station. Main branch route: Restauradores - Rossio.
- 28 September 1966: Opening of the Socorro (former name of the Martim Moniz station), Intendente and Anjos stations. Main branch route: Restauradores - Anjos.
- 18 June 1972: Opening of the Arroios, Alameda, Areeiro, Roma and Alvalade stations. Main branch route: Restauradores - Alvalade.
- 15 October 1988: Opening of the Cidade Universitária, Laranjeiras, Alto dos Moinhos and Colégio Militar/Luz stations. Current Blue Line branch route: Rotunda - Colégio Militar/Luz. Current Yellow Line branch route: Rotunda - Cidade Universitária.
- 3 April 1993: Opening of the Campo Grande station. Main branch route: Restauradores - Campo Grande. Current Yellow Line branch route: Rotunda - Campo Grande.
- 15 July 1995: Creation of the Blue and Yellow lines by building a second Rotunda station. New Blue line route: Colégio Militar/Luz - Campo Grande.
- 18 October 1997: Opening of the Carnide and Pontinha stations. Line route: Pontinha - Campo Grande.
- 1 March 1998: Palhavã station is renamed to Marquês de Pombal, Sete Rios station is renamed to Jardim Zoológico and Socorro station is renamed to Martim Moniz.
- 3 March 1998: Creation of the Blue and Green line by closing the Restauradores - Rossio tunnel. New Blue line route: Pontinha - Restauradores.
- 8 August 1998: Opening of the Baixa-Chiado station. Line route: Pontinha - Baixa-Chiado.
- 15 May 2004: Opening of the Alfornelos and Amadora Este stations. Line route: Amadora Este - Baixa-Chiado.
- 19 December 2007: Opening of the Terreiro do Paço and Santa Apolónia stations. Line route: Amadora Este - Santa Apolónia.
- 13 April 2016: Opening of the Reboleira station. Line route: Reboleira - Santa Apolónia.

== See also ==
- List of Lisbon metro stations
