= João Santa-Rita =

Portuguese architect

João Pedro Santa-Rita (born 20 May 1960) is a Portuguese architect.

Santa-Rita was born in Lisbon. In 1982 he attended the Summer Course of the University of Architecture in Darmstadt, and is licensed in Architecture by the Faculdade de Arquitectura da Universidade Técnica de Lisboa in 1983.

In 1976, he integrated the studio of the architect José Santa-Rita. Between 1986 and 1988 Santa-Rita worked in the atelier of the architect Manuel Vicente in Macau. In 1990, he created the Santa-Rita Arquitectos Office together with José Santa-Rita.

Santa-Rita received an honorable mention in the International Competition for the Revitalization of ULUGH-BEG CENTER in Samarkand and the 1st Prize in International Competition for the Plan of Urbanization Almada Nascente with WAS Atkins and Richard Rogers.

Later, he was co-commissioner of an exhibition of architectural drawings of the Portuguese Society of Authors in Lisbon (2001) and produced and hosted the traveling exhibition of the Atelier Santa-Rita Arquitectos "Objects + Architectures" - Milan 1999; Lisbon / Coimbra in 2000 and "Paysages Strategic "- Paris 2001, Lisbon in 2003 and" The Poetics of La Fragmentazione "- Milan 2006. Santa-Rita is a guest member of the Akademie Fur Baukultur (Germany).

His works were published in Germany, Argentina, Chile, Spain, England, Italy, Netherlands, Japan and Portugal.

== Works and projects ==
Notable architectural projects include:

- 1989 - Master Home, Lisbon, Portugal
- 1991 - Aurélio da Costa Ferreira Institute, Lisbon, Portugal
- 1991 - Reconstruction of a mansion in Campo Mártires da Pátria, Lisbon, Portugal
- 1994 - King John V Exposition, Lisbon, Portugal
- 1996 - Marquis of Pombal (Lisbon Metro), Lisbon, Portugal
- 1997 - Fado Museum, Lisbon, Portugal
- 1997 - Interpretative Center of the Ruins of megalithic Alcalar, Algarve, Portugal
- 1998 - Cabo Ruivo (Lisbon Metro), Lisbon, Portugal
- 2002 - Habitevora - Quinta da Tapada's Matias, Évora, Portugal
- 2002 - House in Bairro Alto, Lisbon, Portugal
- 2004 - Restaurant in Parque da Cidade, Beja, Portugal
- 2004 - Flower Kiosk in Rossio, Lisbon, Portugal
- 2005 - Car park at Avenida Miguel Fernandes, Beja, Portugal
- 2005 - Rio's Restaurant, Oeiras, Portugal
- 2005 - Apartments of Prince Royal, Lisbon, Portugal

Other projects:

- 1989 - Miguel Corte-Real Memorial, Newport, RI, United States
- 1989 - Ismaelita Center, Lisbon, Portugal
- 1991 - Revitalization of the historic centre of Samarkand, Uzbekistan
- 1991 - Houses in Alcainça, Mafra, Portugal
- 1992 - The Gate of the Present, Netherlands
- 1992 - Lusitania, Infinite City, Madrid, Spain
- 1992 - Parque Ecológico de Monsanto, Lisbon, Portugal
- 1993 - Houses in Santarém, Portugal
- 1994 - Competition for Expo '98, Lisbon, Portugal
- 1994 - Competition for the 1996 Olympic Games in Atlanta, United States
- 1994 - Convent of Christ, Tomar, Portugal
- 1995 - Residence of the Portuguese Ambassador, Brasília, Brazil
- 1996 - Lisnave, Lisbon, Portugal
- 1996 - Monument to Dr. Azeredo Perdigão, Lisbon, Portugal
- 1997 - Rehabilitation of the José Malhoa Museum, Caldas da Rainha, Portugal
- 1997 - Complex Amphitheater, Ponta Delgada, Azores, Portugal
- 1998 - Urban Renewal Plan for Cacilhas, Almada, Portugal
- 1998 - Portuguese Embassy, Berlin, Germany
- 1999 - Expansion of the National Museum Machado de Castro, Coimbra, Portugal
- 2002 - Plan Detail of Urban Beaches, Costa da Caparica, Almada, Portugal
- 2003 - Mortuary buildings, Beja, Portugal
- 2004 - Multifunctional Building, Luanda, Angola
- 2004 - Plan of Urbanization Almada Nascente, Almada, Portugal
- 2005 - Museum of the History of Polish Jews in Warsaw, Warsaw, Poland
