= Marquês de Pombal Station =

Metro station in Lisbon, Portugal

Marquês de Pombal
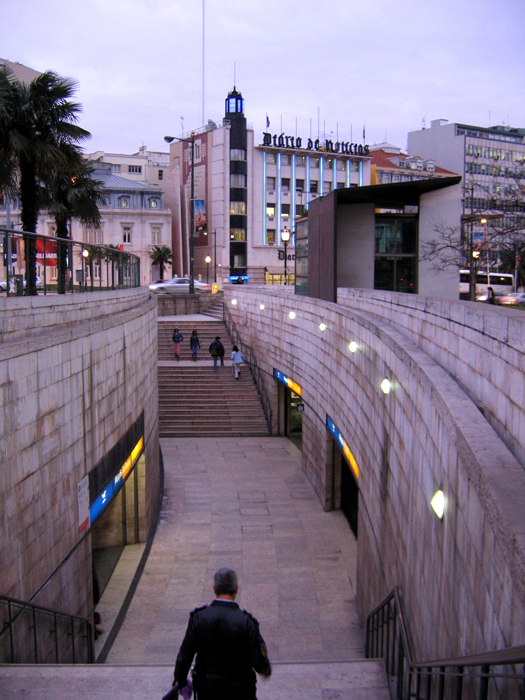

General information
- Location: Praça Marquês de Pombal, Lisbon; Portugal
- Coordinates: 38°43′29″N 9°9′2″W
- Owner: Government-owned corporation
- Operator: Metropolitano de Lisboa, EPE
- Line: Blue Line Yellow Line
- Platforms: 4 side platforms
- Tracks: 4

Construction
- Structure type: Underground
- Accessible: yes
- Architect: Blue Line: Falcão e Cunha Yellow Line: José Santa-Rita and João Santa-Rita

Other information
- Station code: MP
- Fare zone: L

History
- Opened: Blue Line: 29 December 1959 (66 years ago); Yellow Line: 15 July 1995 (31 years ago)
- Rebuilt: Blue Line: 15 July 1995 (31 years ago)
- Former names: Rotunda (1959–1997)

Services
| Preceding station | Lisbon Metro | Following station |
|---|---|---|
| Parque towards Reboleira | Blue Line | Avenida towards Santa Apolónia |
| Picoas towards Odivelas | Yellow Line | Rato Terminus |
Route map
Location

Interior of the station

Marquês de Pombal is an interchange station where the Blue and Yellow Lines of the Lisbon Metro connect, being located on Praça Marquês de Pombal.

== History ==
The Blue Line station is one of the 11 stations that belong to the original Lisbon Metro network, opened on 29 December 1959. The architectural design of the original Blue Line station is by Falcão e Cunha.

On 15 July 1995 the Yellow Line station was built, based on the architectural design of José Santa-Rita and João Santa-Rita, and the Blue Line station was extended and refurbished, based on the architectural design of Duarte Nuno Simões and Nuno Simões.

== Connections ==
=== Urban buses ===
==== Carris ====
- 702 Marquês de Pombal ⇄ Serafina (Rua da Igreja)
- 711 Terreiro do Paço ⇄ Alto da Damaia
- 712 Estação de Santa Apolónia ⇄ Alcântara Mar (Museu do Oriente)
- 720 Picheleira/Rua Faria Vasconcelos ⇄ Calvário
- 723 Desterro ⇄ Algés
- 727 Estação Roma-Areeiro ⇄ Restelo - Avenida das Descobertas
- 732 Marquês de Pombal ⇄ Caselas
- 736 Cais do Sodré ⇄ Odivelas (Bairro Dr. Lima Pimentel)
- 738 Quinta dos Barros ⇄ Alto de Santo Amaro
- 744 Marquês de Pombal ⇄ Moscavide (Quinta das Laranjeiras)
- 783 Amoreiras (Centro Comercial) ⇄ Portela - Rua Mouzinho de Albuquerque

==== Aerobus ====
- Linha 1 Aeroporto ⇄ Cais do Sodré
- Linha 2 Aeroporto ⇄ Sete Rios

=== Suburban buses ===
==== Transportes Sul do Tejo ====
- 151 Lisboa (Marquês de Pombal) ⇄ Charneca de Caparica (Solmar)
- 155 Lisboa (Marquês de Pombal) ⇄ Costa de Caparica
- 169 Santa Maria do Pinhal ⇄ Lisboa (Marquês de Pombal) (via Feijó)

==== Vimeca / Lisboa Transportes ====
- 007 Lisboa (Marquês de Pombal) ⇄ Carnaxide (Hospital de Santa Cruz)
- 011 Linda-a-Velha ⇄ Lisboa (Marquês de Pombal)
- 013 Linda-a-Velha ⇄ Lisboa (Marquês de Pombal) ⇄ Queluz de Baixo (via Carnaxide/Queijas)´´´´015´´ lisbon <<Marquês De Pombal-Urbanização De S.Marcos
- 185 Amadora (Hospital) ⇄ Lisboa (Marquês de Pombal)

== See also ==
- List of Lisbon metro stations
