= Aeroporto Station (Lisbon Metro) =

Metro station in Lisbon, Portugal

Aeroporto
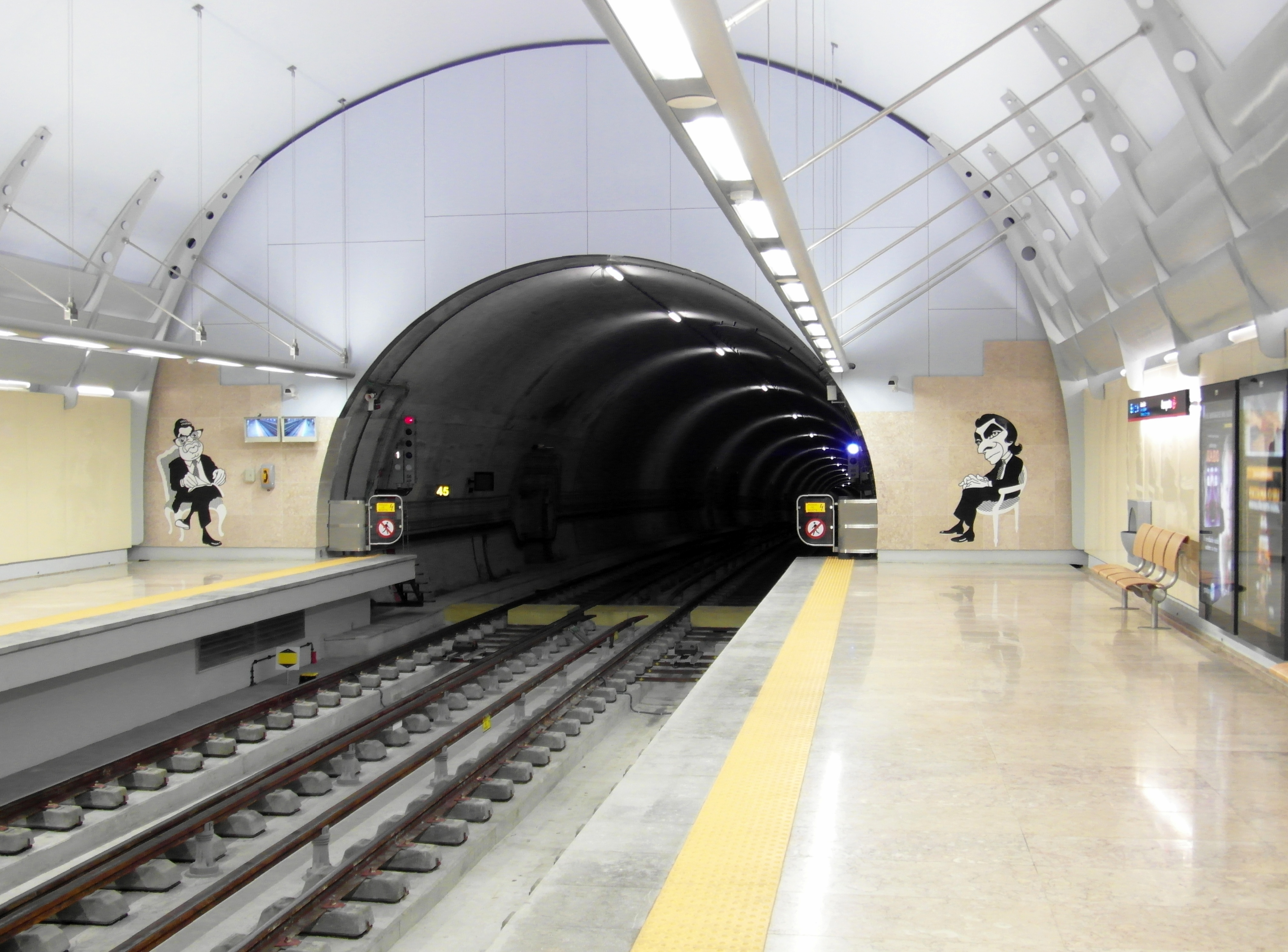

General information
- Location: Lisbon Airport, Lisbon; Portugal
- Coordinates: 38.769°N 9.129°W
- Owner: Government-owned corporation
- Operator: Metropolitano de Lisboa, EPE
- Line: Red Line
- Platforms: 2 side platforms
- Tracks: 2
- Connections: Airport interchange

Construction
- Structure type: Underground
- Accessible: yes
- Architect: Leopoldo de Almeida Rosa

Other information
- Station code: AP
- Fare zone: L

History
- Opened: July 17, 2012 (14 years ago)

Services
Preceding station	Lisbon Metro	Following station
Encarnação towards São Sebastião	Red Line	Terminus
Route map
Location

Aeroporto is a terminal station on the Red Line of the Lisbon Metro. The station was built to serve Lisbon Airport.

The station, designed by the architect Leopoldo de Almeida Rosa, opened on July 17, 2012 in conjunction with the Encarnação and Moscavide stations, as part of the expansion of the line to serve Lisbon Portela Airport.

== Connections ==
=== Urban buses ===
==== Carris ====
- 208 Cais do Sodré ⇄ Estação Oriente (Interface) (morning service)
- 705 Estação Oriente (Interface) ⇄ Estação Roma-Areeiro
- 722 Praça de Londres ⇄ Portela - Rua dos Escritores
- 744 Marquês de Pombal ⇄ Moscavide (Quinta das Laranjeiras)
- 783 Amoreiras (Centro Comercial) ⇄ Portela - Rua Mouzinho de Albuquerque

==== Aerobus ====
- Linha 1 Aeroporto ⇄ Cais do Sodré
- Linha 2 Aeroporto ⇄ Sete Rios

=== Suburban buses ===
==== Rodoviária de Lisboa ====
- 312 Lisboa (Campo Grande) circulação via Charneca
- 313 Lisboa (Campo Grande) circulação via Sacavém
- 319 Lisboa (Areeiro) ⇄ Alverca (Zona Industrial)
- 320 Lisboa (Areeiro) ⇄ Alverca (Estação) via Forte da Casa
- 321 Lisboa (Areeiro) ⇄ Via Rara
- 329 Lisboa (Campo Grande) ⇄ Quinta da Piedade

== See also ==
- List of Lisbon metro stations
