= Cais do Sodré Station =

Metro station in Lisbon, Portugal

Cais do Sodré
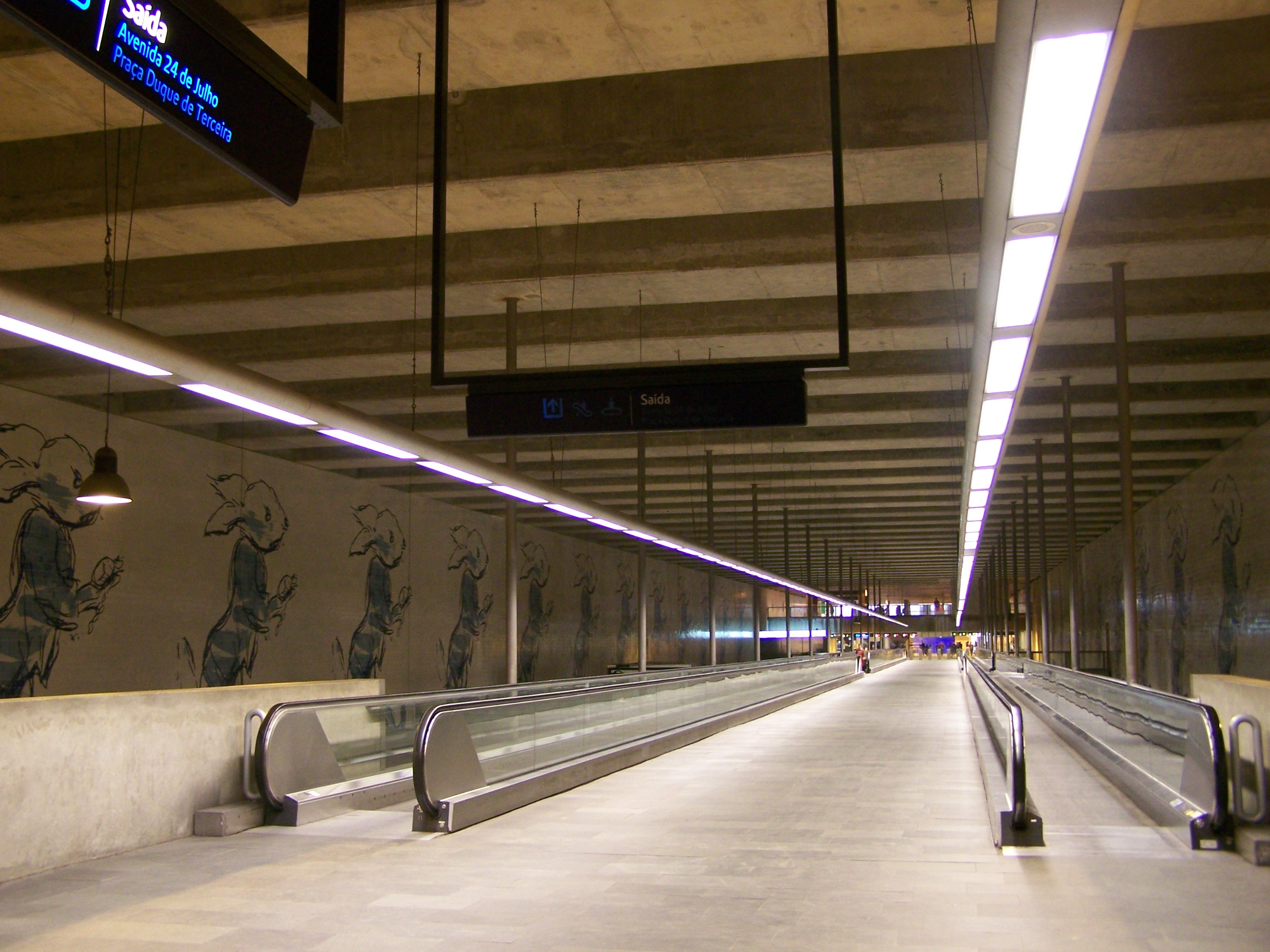

General information
- Location: Praça Duque da Terceira, Lisbon; Portugal
- Coordinates: 38°42′21″N 9°8′41″W
- Owner: Government-owned corporation
- Operator: Metropolitano de Lisboa, EPE
- Line: Green Line
- Platforms: one side platform and one island platform
- Tracks: 3
- Connections: Mainline rail interchange ferry/water interchange

Construction
- Structure type: Underground
- Accessible: yes
- Architect: Pedro Botelho and Nuno Teotónio Pereira

Other information
- Station code: CS
- Fare zone: L

History
- Opened: 18 April 1998 (28 years ago)

Services
Preceding station	Lisbon Metro	Following station
Baixa-Chiado towards Telheiras	Green Line	Terminus
Future service
Baixa-Chiado towards Telheiras	Green Line	Santos towards Rato
Route map
Location

Cais do Sodré is a station on the Green Line of the Lisbon Metro. It is located in the Praça Duque da Terceira, connecting to the Cais do Sodré railway station and a boat port (allowing for quick travel between Lisbon and the cities of Cacilhas, Seixal, and Montijo).

== History ==
This metro station was built by Pedro Botelho and Nuno Teotónio Pereira and the art work was done by António Dacosta, which left some of his drawings to be used in the station after his death, with some help from the painter Pedro Morais.

This station won both the Valmor and Municipal Architecture prizes in 2008.

== Connections ==
=== Urban buses and trams ===
==== Carris ====
- 15E Praça da Figueira ⇄ Algés
- 18E Cais do Sodré ⇄ Cemitério da Ajuda
- 25E Praça da Figueira ⇄ Campo Ourique (Prazeres)
- 201 Cais do Sodré ⇄ Linda-a-Velha (morning service)
- 202 Cais do Sodré ⇄ Bairro Padre Cruz (morning service)
- 206 Cais do Sodré ⇄ Bairro Padre Cruz (morning service)
- 207 Cais do Sodré ⇄ Fetais (morning service)
- 208 Cais do Sodré ⇄ Estação Oriente (Interface) (morning service)
- 210 Cais do Sodré ⇄ Prior Velho (morning service)
- 706 Cais do Sodré ⇄ Estação Santa Apolónia
- 714 Praça da Figueira ⇄ Outurela
- 728 Restelo - Av. das Descobertas ⇄ Portela - Av. dos Descobrimentos
- 732 Marquês de Pombal ⇄ Caselas
- 735 Cais do Sodré ⇄ Hospital de Santa Maria
- 736 Cais do Sodré ⇄ Odivelas (Bairro Dr. Lima Pimentel)
- 758 Cais do Sodré ⇄ Portas de Benfica
- 760 Gomes Freire ⇄ Cemitério da Ajuda
- 781 Cais do Sodré ⇄ Prior Velho
- 782 Cais do Sodré ⇄ Praça José Queirós

==== Aerobus ====
- Linha 1 Aeroporto ⇄ Cais do Sodré

=== Rail ===
==== Comboios de Portugal ====
- Lisboa - Cais do Sodré ⇄ Oeiras
- Lisboa - Cais do Sodré ⇄ Cascais

=== Boat ===
==== Transtejo ====
- Cais do Sodré ⇄ Cacilhas
- Cais do Sodré ⇄ Montijo
- Cais do Sodré ⇄ Seixal

== See also ==
- List of Lisbon metro stations
