= Santa Apolónia Station (Lisbon Metro) =

Metro station in Lisbon

Santa Apolónia
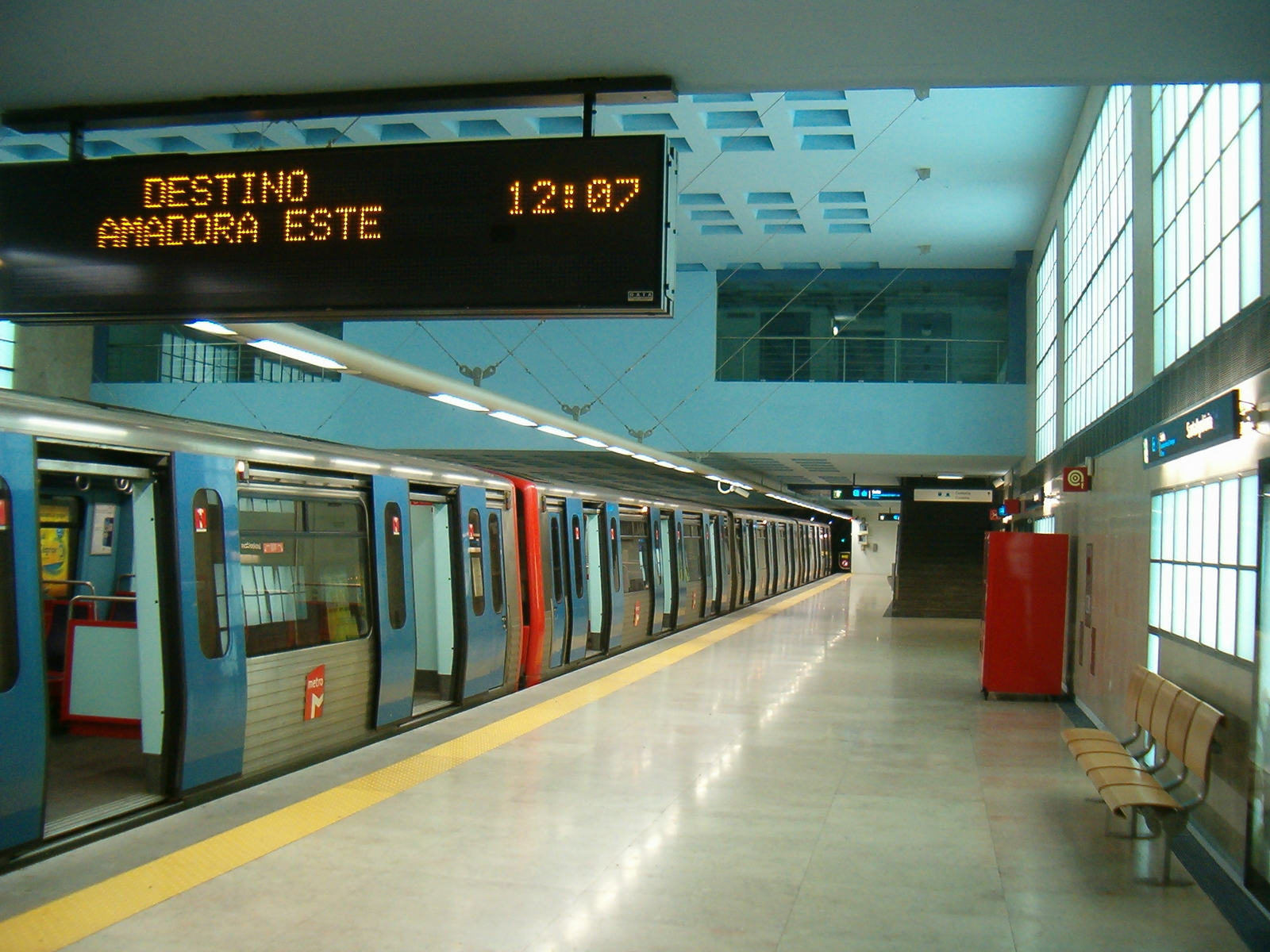

General information
- Location: Avenida Infante D. Henrique, Lisbon; Portugal
- Coordinates: 38°42′46″N 9°7′25″W
- Owner: Government-owned corporation
- Operator: Metropolitano de Lisboa, EPE
- Line: Blue Line
- Platforms: 2 side platforms
- Tracks: 2
- Connections: Santa Apolónia

Construction
- Structure type: Underground
- Accessible: yes
- Architect: Leopoldo de Almeida Rosa

Other information
- Station code: SP
- Fare zone: L

History
- Opened: 19 December 2007 (18 years ago)

Services
Preceding station	Lisbon Metro	Following station
Terreiro do Paço towards Reboleira	Blue Line	Terminus
Route map
Location

Santa Apolónia station is the southern terminus on the Blue Line of the Lisbon Metro.

== History ==
Opened on 19 December 2007, in conjunction with the Terreiro do Paço station, the station is located on Avenida Infante D. Henrique, connecting to the Santa Apolónia railway station (North and Azambuja Lines). It takes its name from the railway station, which was constructed partly on the site of the old Convent of Santa Apolónia.

The architectural design of the station is by Leopoldo de Almeida Rosa.

== Connections ==
=== Urban buses and Interurban buses ===
==== Carris ====
- 206 Cais do Sodré ⇄ Bairro Padre Cruz (morning service)
- 210 Cais do Sodré ⇄ Prior Velho (morning service)
- 706 Cais do Sodré ⇄ Estação Santa Apolónia
- 712 Santa Apolónia (Lisbon Metro) ⇄ Alcântara Mar (Museu do Oriente)
- 728 Restelo - Av. das Descobertas ⇄ Portela - Av. dos Descobrimentos
- 734 Martim Moniz ⇄ Estação Santa Apolónia
- 735 Cais do Sodré ⇄ Hospital de Santa Maria
- 759 Restauradores ⇄ Estação Oriente (Interface)
- 781 Cais do Sodré ⇄ Prior Velho
- 782 Cais do Sodré ⇄ Praça José Queirós
- 794 Terreiro do Paço ⇄ Estação Oriente (Interface)

=== Rail ===
==== Comboios de Portugal ====
- Lisboa - Santa Apolónia ⇄ Azambuja
- Lisboa - Santa Apolónia ⇄ Entroncamento (Regional)
- Lisboa - Santa Apolónia ⇄ Torres Vedras (Regional)
- Lisboa - Santa Apolónia ⇄ Caldas da rainha (Regional)
- Lisboa - Santa Apolónia ⇄ Castelo Branco (Regional)
- Lisboa - Santa Apolónia ⇄ Porto-Campanhã (Regional)
- Lisboa - Santa Apolónia ⇄ Guarda (Regional)
- Lisboa - Santa Apolónia ⇄ Tomar (InterRegional)
- Lisboa - Santa Apolónia ⇄ Porto - Campanhã (InterRegional)
- Lisboa - Santa Apolónia ⇄ Porto - Campanhã (Intercities)
- Lisboa - Santa Apolónia ⇄ Braga (Intercities)
- Lisboa - Santa Apolónia ⇄ Guimarães (Intercities)
- Lisboa - Santa Apolónia ⇄ Guarda (Intercities)
- Lisboa - Santa Apolónia ⇄ Covilhã (Intercities)
- Lisboa - Santa Apolónia ⇄ Porto - Campanhã (Alfa Pendular)
- Lisboa - Santa Apolónia ⇄ Braga (Alfa Pendular)
- Lisboa - Santa Apolónia ⇄ Guimarães (Alfa Pendular)
- Lisboa - Santa Apolónia ⇄ Hendaye (International)
- Lisboa - Santa Apolónia ⇄ Madrid (International)

== See also ==
- List of Lisbon metro stations
