= Reboleira Station (Lisbon Metro) =

Metro station in Amadora, Portugal

Reboleira
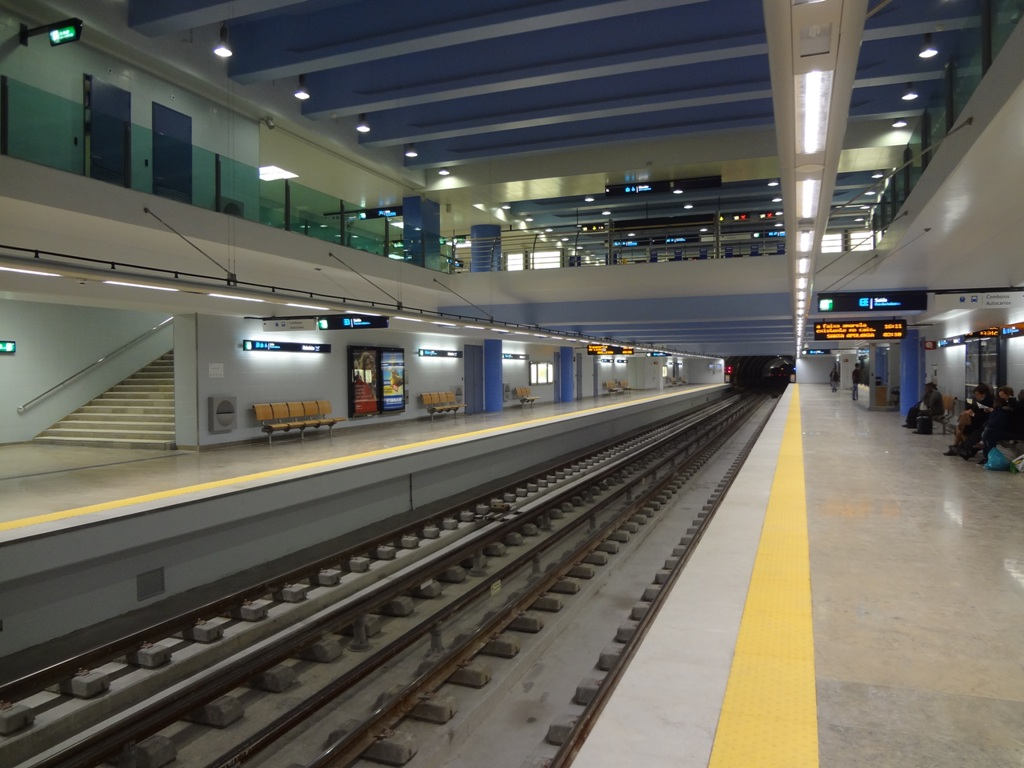

General information
- Location: Rua das Indústrias, Amadora; Portugal
- Coordinates: 38°45′8″N 9°13′29″W
- Owner: Government-owned corporation
- Operator: Metropolitano de Lisboa, EPE
- Line: Blue Line
- Platforms: 2 side platforms
- Tracks: 2

Construction
- Structure type: Underground
- Accessible: Yes
- Architect: Leopoldo de Almeida Rosa

Other information
- Station code: RB
- Fare zone: 1

History
- Opened: 13 April 2016 (10 years ago)

Services
| Preceding station | Lisbon Metro | Following station |
|---|---|---|
| Terminus | Blue Line | Amadora Este towards Santa Apolónia |
Route map
Location

Reboleira station is the northern terminus on the Blue Line of the Lisbon Metro.

== History ==
The station opened on 13 April 2016. The station is located on Rua das Indústrias, connecting to the Reboleira Railway Station (Sintra Line).

The architectural design of the station is by Leopoldo de Almeida Rosa.

== Connections ==
=== Urban buses ===
==== Carris ====
- 767 Campo Mártires da Pátria ⇄ Reboleira (Metro)

=== Suburban buses ===
==== Vimeca / Lisboa Transportes ====
- 20 Algés (Estação) ⇄ Amadora (Estação Sul)
- 105 Queluz (Monte Abraão) ⇄ Reboleira (Metro)
- 108 Reboleira (Metro) ⇄ Estação Queluz/Belas
- 109 Reboleira (Estação) - Circulação via Damaia de Cima
- 144 Belém (Estação) ⇄ Cacém (Bairro do Grajal)
- 145 Reboleira (Estação) - Circulação via Urbanização Casas do Lago / Amadora (Hospital)
- 185 Lisboa (Marquês de Pombal) ⇄ Amadora (Hospital)
- 186 Amadora (Hospital) ⇄ Falagueira (Estação)
- 189 Amadora (Estação Sul) ⇄ Falagueira (Estação)

=== Rail ===
==== Comboios de Portugal ====
- Sintra ⇄ Lisboa - Rossio
- Sintra ⇄ Lisboa - Oriente
- Sintra ⇄ Alverca
- Mira Sintra/Meleças ⇄ Lisboa - Rossio

== See also ==
- List of Lisbon metro stations
