= Olivais, Lisbon =

Olivais
- Civil parish
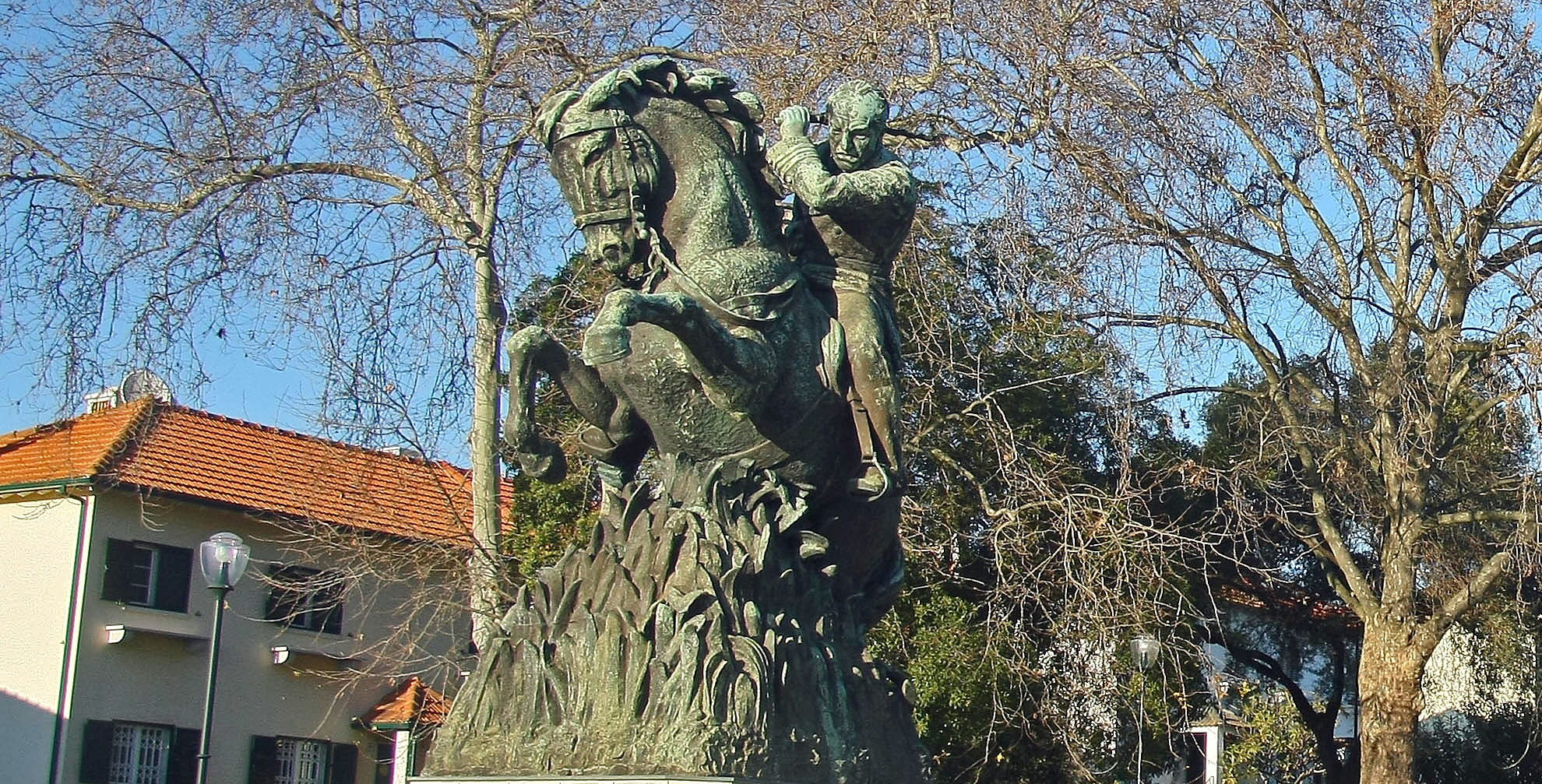
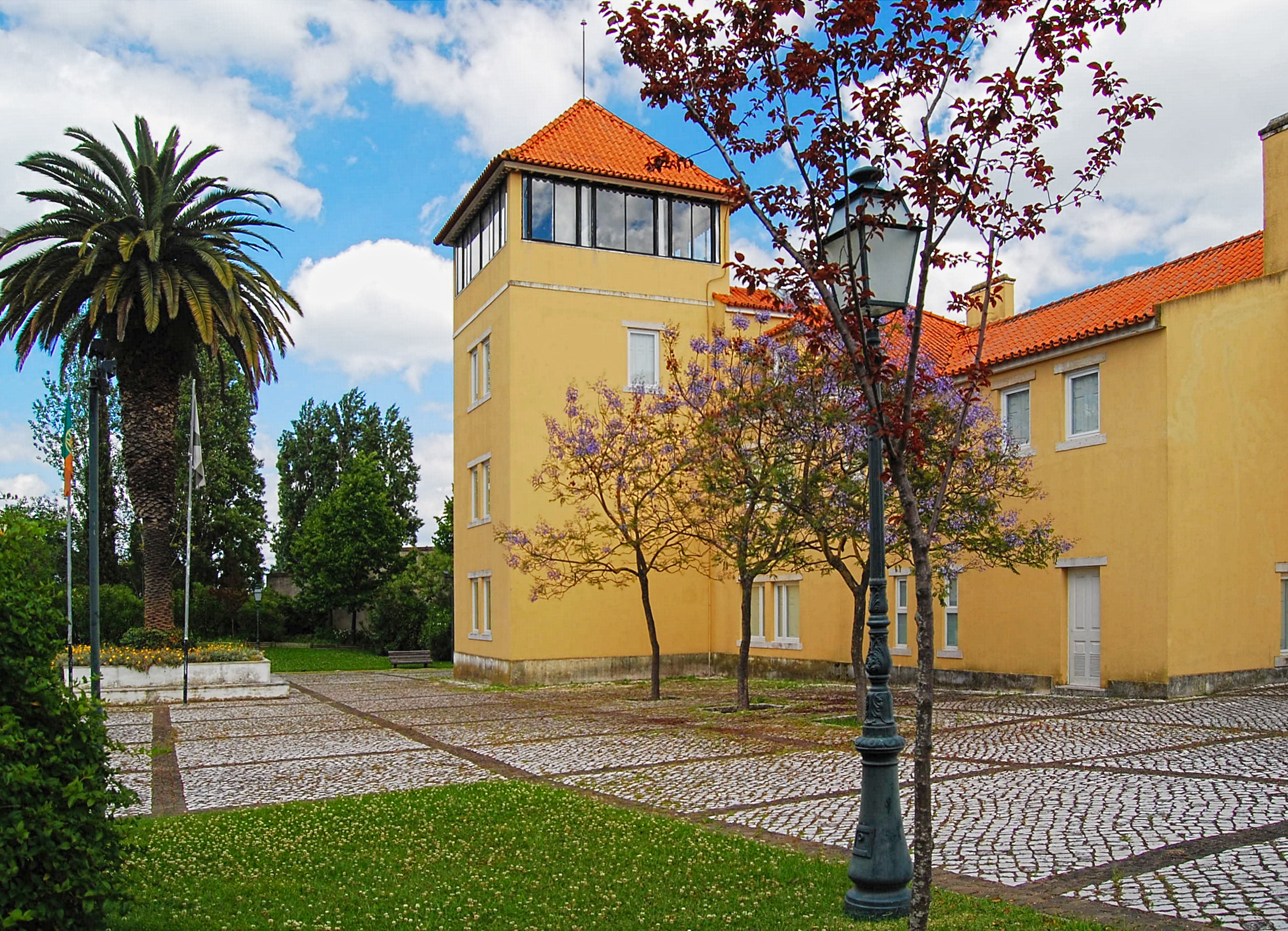
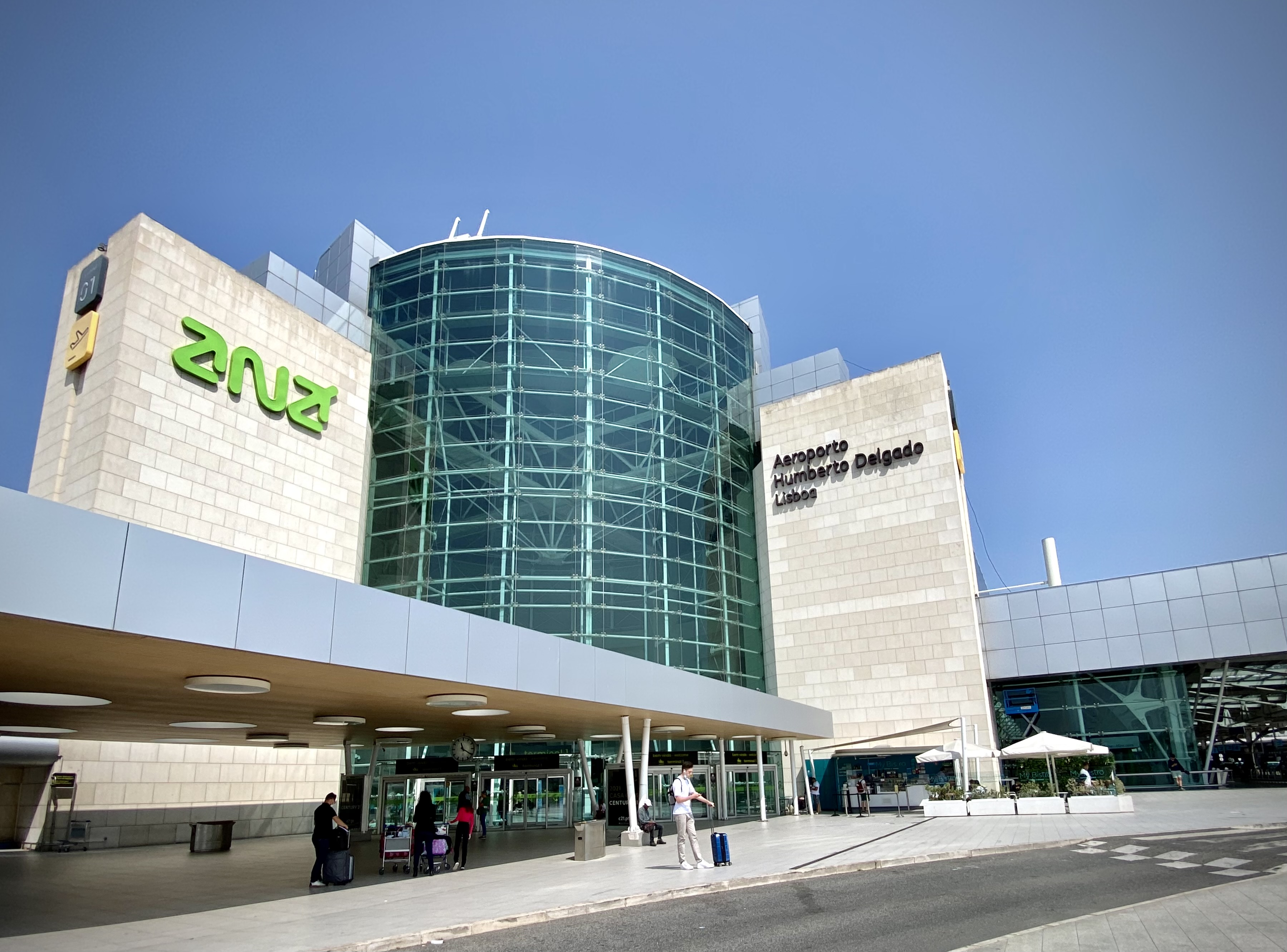
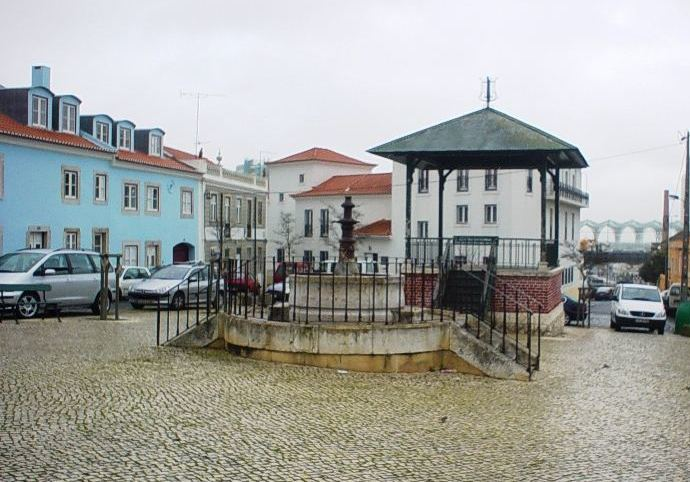
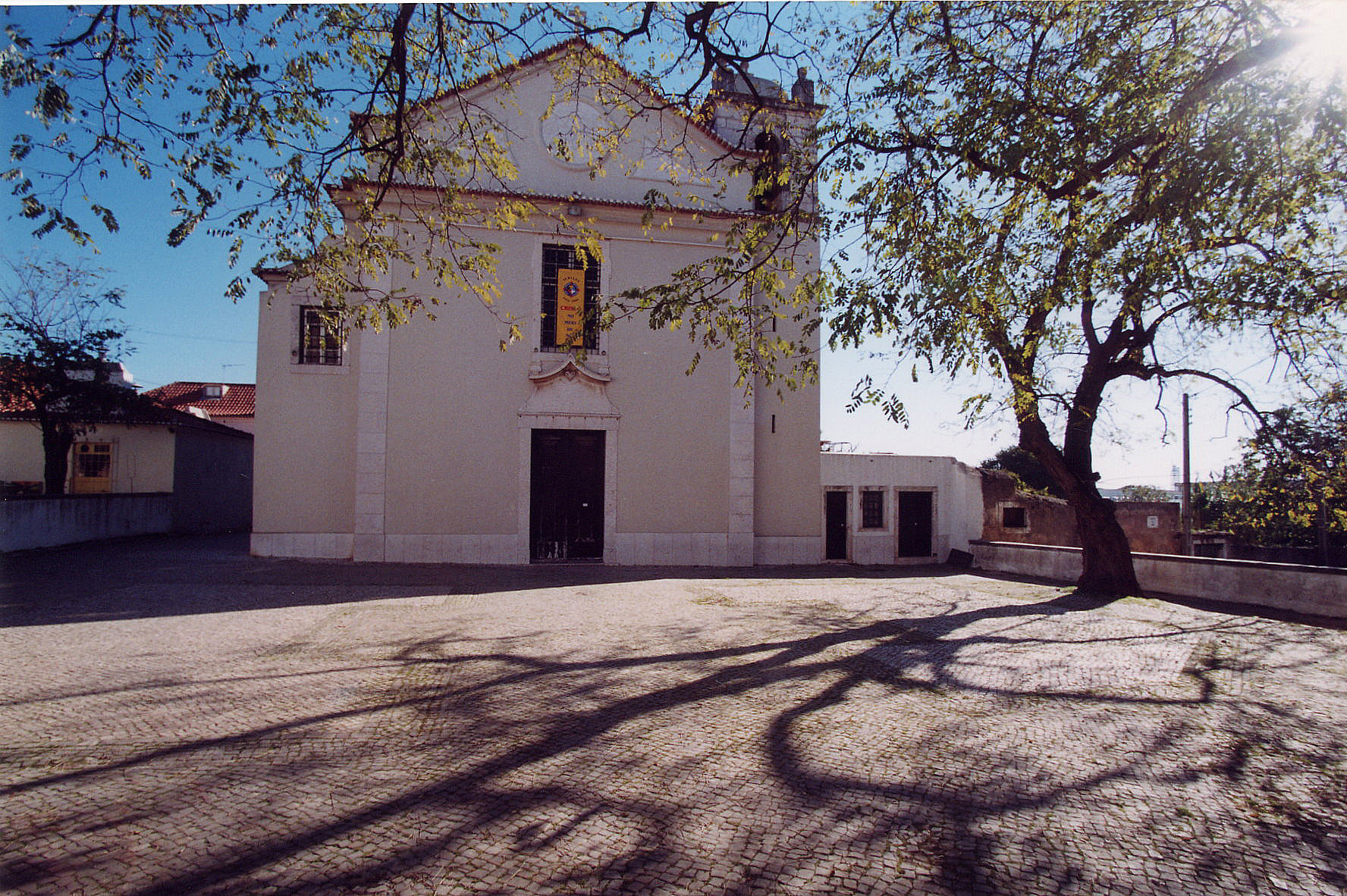
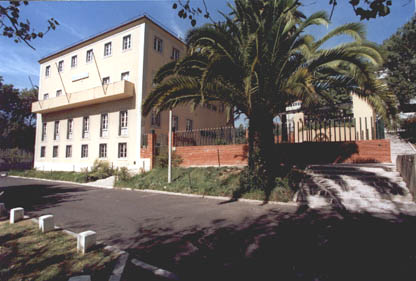
- Clockwise: Monument to João Maria Ferreira do Amaral; Viscondessa dos Olivais Square; Lisbon Airport; Olivais Philharmonic Society; Santa Maria dos Olivais Church; Municipal Library of Olivais

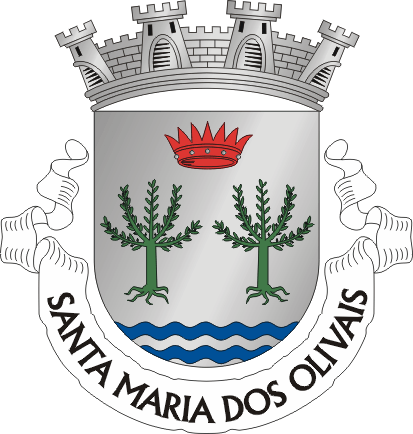
- Coat of arms

- Coordinates: 38.774°N 9.118°W
- Country: Portugal
- Region: Lisbon
- Metropolitan area: Lisbon
- District: Lisbon
- Municipality: Lisbon

Area
  - Total: 8.09 km^{2} (3.12 sq mi)

Population (2021)
  - Total: 32,179
  - Density: 3,980/km^{2} (10,300/sq mi)
- Time zone: UTC+00:00 (WET)
  - Summer (DST): UTC+01:00 (WEST)
- Patron: Saint Mary
- Website: www.jf-olivais.pt

Olivais (Portuguese pronunciation: [oliˈvajʃ]) is a freguesia (civil parish) and traditional quarter of Lisbon, the capital of Portugal. It is situated in the eastern part of the city, bordered by Parque das Nações to the east, Marvila and Alvalade to the south, and Lumiar and Santa Clara to the west. As of the 2021 census, it had a population of 32,179.

== History ==
=== Kingdom of Portugal and incorporation into Lisbon (1147–1886) ===
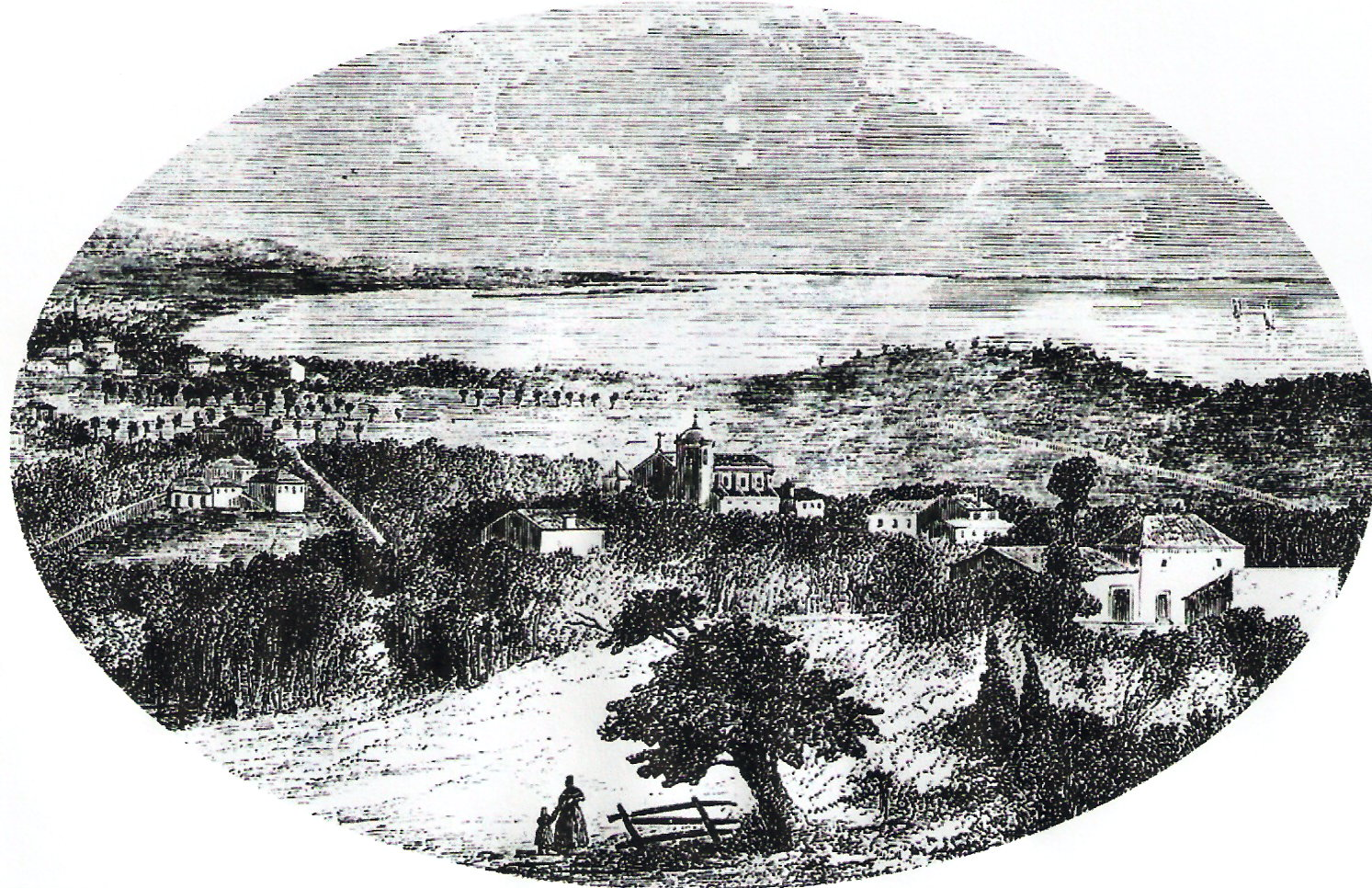
The location of the Olivais headquarters, before its use. 19th century engraving. Drawing perhaps from the 16th century. At this time, Sacavém, on a bend in the Tagus, was visible from the temple site

The parish was created in 1397, thanks to the intervention of the first bishop of Lisbon João Anes (bishop). The parish was duly sanctioned through a papal bull issued on the 1st of July in 1400 by Pope Boniface IX.

This new ecclesiastical entity was created by incorporating territory from the Lisbon Term. These lands, long before their inclusion in the Parish of Olivais, had previously comprised the outskirts of the city, situated beyond Chelas. The Marvila district, once home to Moorish mosques, had been in the possession of the bishopric since the year 1149. This land may have been affiliated with the Parish of Sacavém, which was established in the 12th century, potentially encompassing the areas of Marcos, Encarnação, and Portela. The demarcation of boundaries in this regard was somewhat vague and subject to fluctuation.

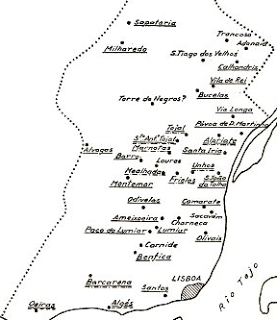
Map of the Term of Lisbon in 1527

The Lisbon Term was granted to the capital city in 1385 by the benevolent D. João I, as a token of gratitude for services rendered to the nation and the monarchy. Its territory extended as follows: encompassing the entire expanse of the kingdom from the western coastline along the Atlantic Ocean, to the south along the same ocean and the Tagus River, to the east along the Tagus River, and demarcated to the north, conceivably, by the Alcabrichel River on the ocean side, and the Ota River on the Tagus side. Consequently, the area that would later evolve into the parish of Olivais fell under the jurisdiction of the city of Lisbon. This state of affairs endured until the 19th century.

This donation by the Master of Avis was advantageous for Lisbon, but it some who had vested interests in the area were dissatisfied. For example, D. Nuno Álvares Pereira, the lord of the reguengos of Sacavém, Unhos, Frielas, and Charneca, voiced his grievances to the monarch. However, through a letter of sentence issued on the 13th of April in 1429, the king declared, "we judge that the said city exercises jurisdiction over the said places freely, unencumbered by the letters of donation presented by the said count, and without prejudice to him in this matter."

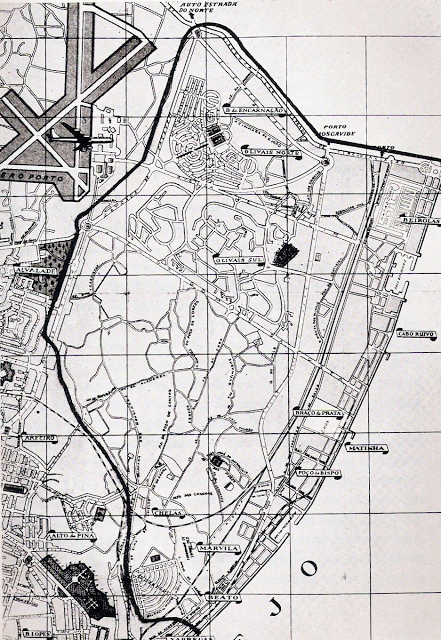
Reproduction of the original area of the parish of Olivais

The parish church must have been constructed no earlier than the 14th century, given the year of the parish's formation. Local legend states that the patron saint's image was found within the hollow of an olive tree trunk, leading to the naming of the new jurisdiction as Nossa Senhora or Santa Maria dos Olivais. The vicar ordered the trunk to be uprooted and preserved, and it was kept in the sacristy until 1700.

In 1420, at the invitation of the vicar himself, the Congregation of Secular Canons of Saint John the Evangelist built their first temple in the parish. However, the friars were expelled, likely due to personal differences, and Archbishop D. Jorge da Costa united the church with the chapel of Nossa Senhora da Conceição at the Lóios Convent, near the São Jorge Castle of Lisbon, where they have been since 1442. Until 1834, the tithes of the parish belonged to the Lóios Convent. The church of Olivais became or already was a "vicarage, presented by the Rector of the Santo Eloy Convent."

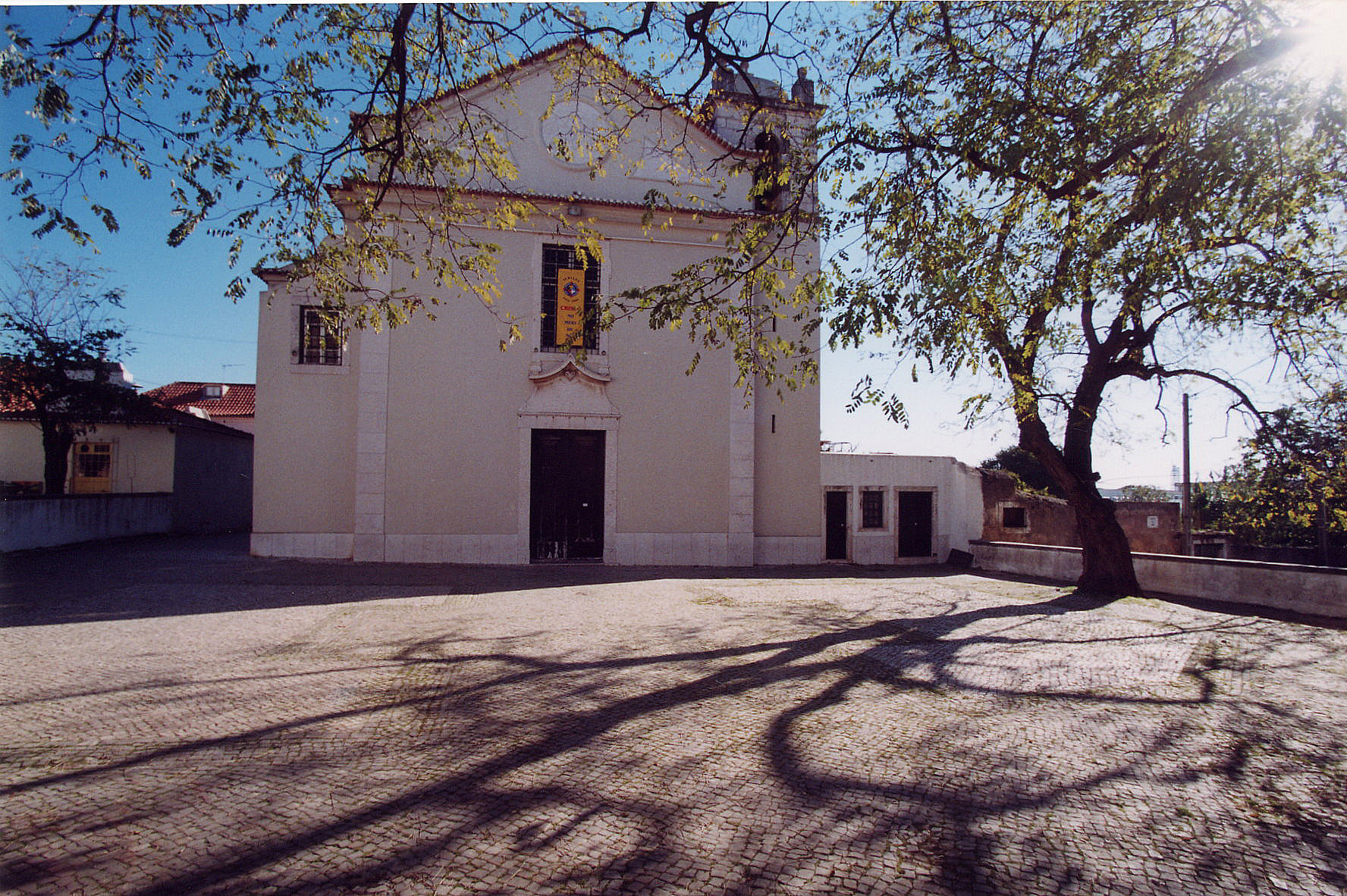
Santa Maria dos Olivais Church

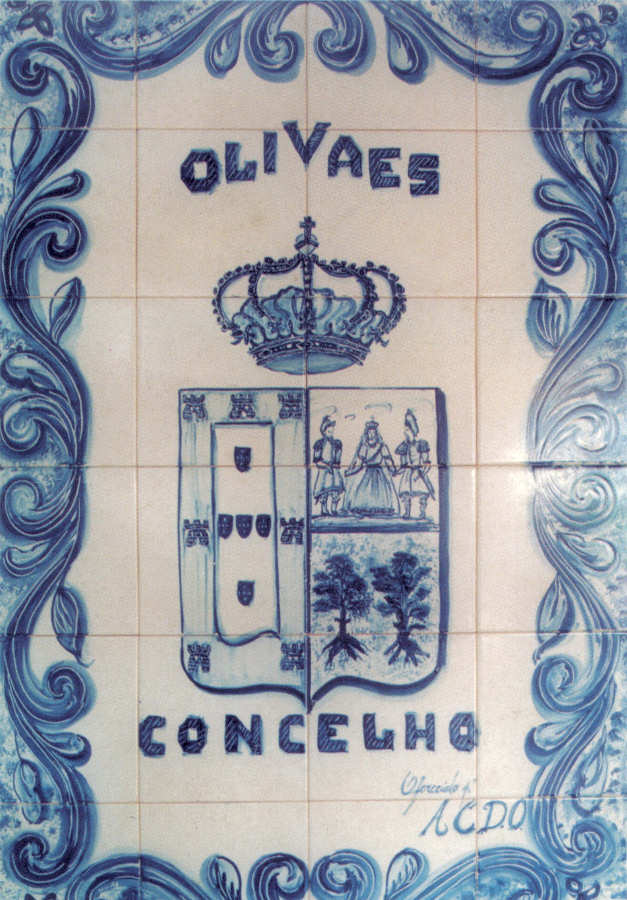
Coat of arms of Olivais municipality

The proximity to Lisbon benefited the new parish, as the area grew with numerous settlements. However, the central area occupied by the church experienced slow growth in contrast to the more rapid development of peripheral zones, especially those along the Tagus River on this side of Cabo Ruivo. It is believed that Nossa Senhora dos Olivais owes its existence to the requests of the local population, given the difficulty of attending religious services in the distant churches of Lisbon and Sacavém, which were heavily dependent on poor transportation, particularly during the winter.

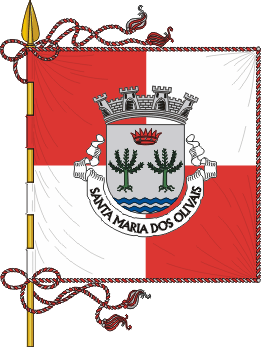
Parish flag

In 1674, the Convent of São Cornélio, belonging to the Franciscan friars, was built in the parish.

The construction of the railway in 1856 triggered the new industries in the parish, that benefited from both the proximity to the railway line and the nearby river port of Olivais. However, as Lisbon expanded into the neighboring rural areas, Olivais began to decline toward the end of the 19th century, and its most profitable areas were parceled off and gradually annexed into Lisbon:

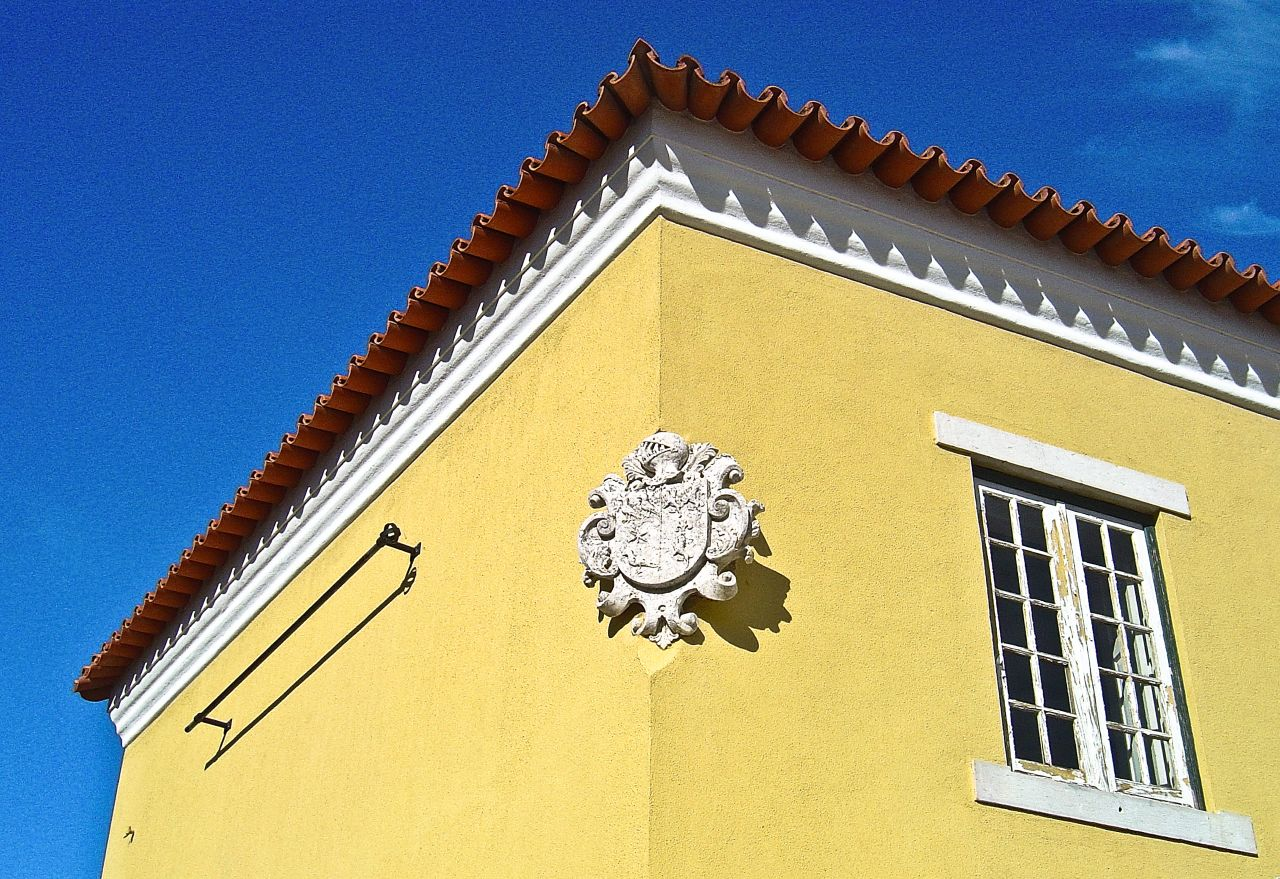
Palácio do Contador-Mor

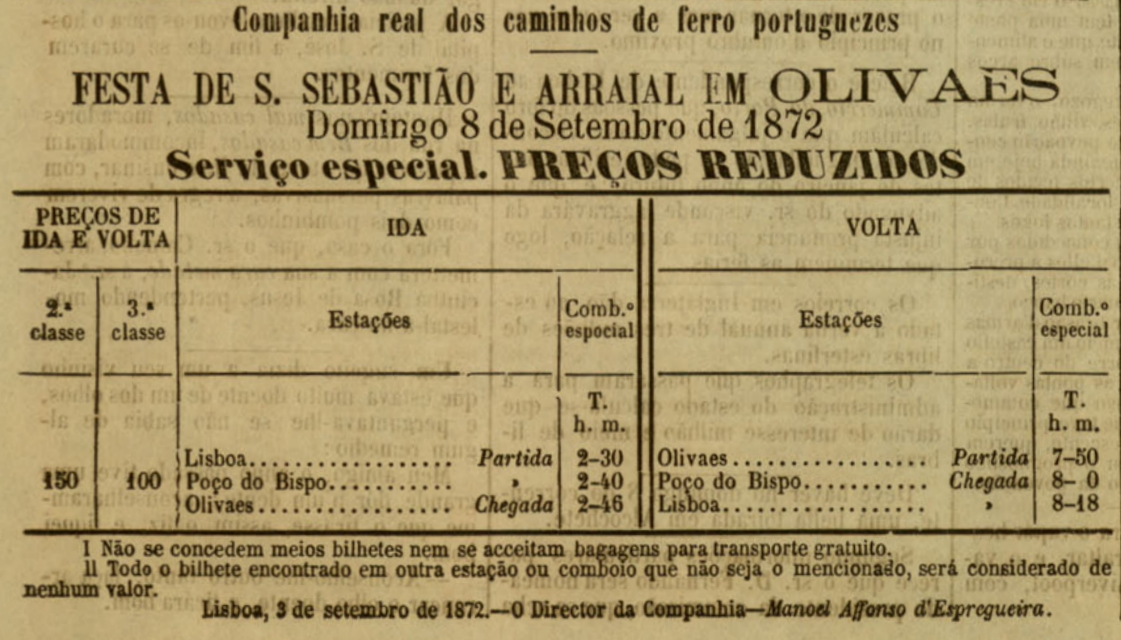
Announcement from Companhia Real dos Caminhos de Ferro Portugueses, for round-trip tickets from Lisbon to Olivais at special prices, on the occasion of the feast of São Sebastião in 1872

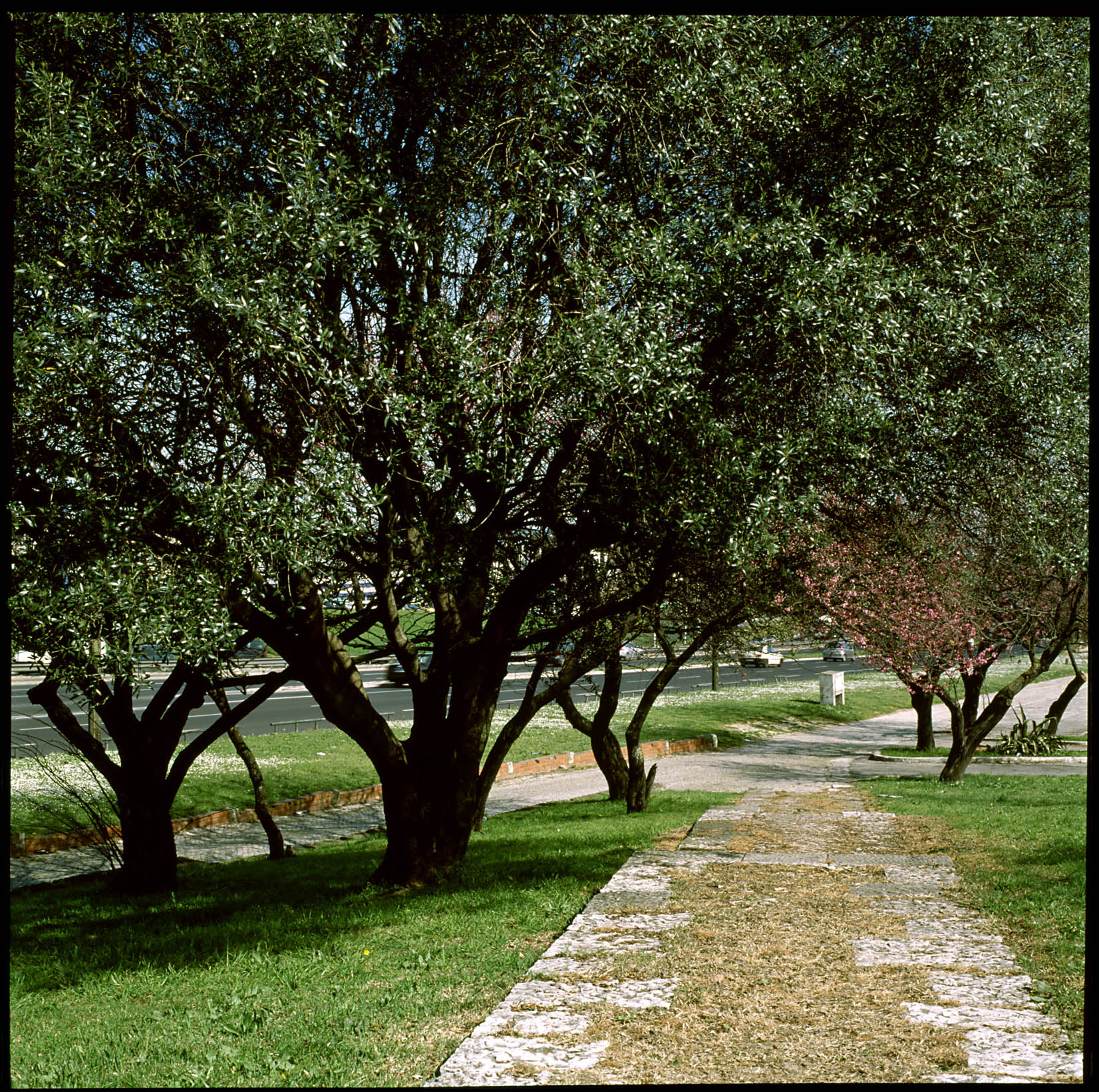
Olive trees in Olivais: the Portuguese for olive trees is, in fact, Olivais

- In 1654, the position of Corregedor do Crime (Crime Magistrate) of the Term was abolished, and the 42 parishes under his jurisdiction (including Olivais) were placed under the jurisdiction of the city's magistrates for law enforcement purposes.
- In the 1700s, a substantial portion of the Olivais parish was commonly regarded as integrated into the capital. On May 12, 1758, the boundaries of the city extended by royal decree from the Tejo River to Santa Apolónia on one side, with Olivais bordering the Vale de Chelas. On the Sacavém side, the delineations of the parish encompassed Marcos, Encarnação, Portela, and the Road to Sacavém, in the vicinity of Bela Vista.
- In 1770, the eastern territory was carved out to establish the new parish of Beato, which encompassed Chelas, Fonte do Louro up to Cruz do Almada, Rua Direita de Marvila, Grilo, Beato, and Poço do Bispo. The updated 1780 plan returned Rua Direita de Marvila to Olivais.
- In 1811 and 1834, Olivais participated in the city's division into 13 neighborhoods and six judicatures, each with its own Term. The Alfama neighborhood judicature comprised the parishes of São Bartolomeu da Charneca, Campo Grande, São João da Talha, Santa Iria da Azoia, Olivais, Sacavém, São Tiago dos Velhos, and Vialonga.
- On May 21, 1841, the administrative structure of Lisbon was revised and reduced to six neighborhoods, although Olivais remained under Alfama.
- The Municipality of Olivais was created by decree of the Ministry of the Kingdom on September 11, 1852. The civil governor of Lisbon appointed a temporary Administrative Committee (until elections could be held) and designated a state building to serve as the Town Hall for the new municipality.

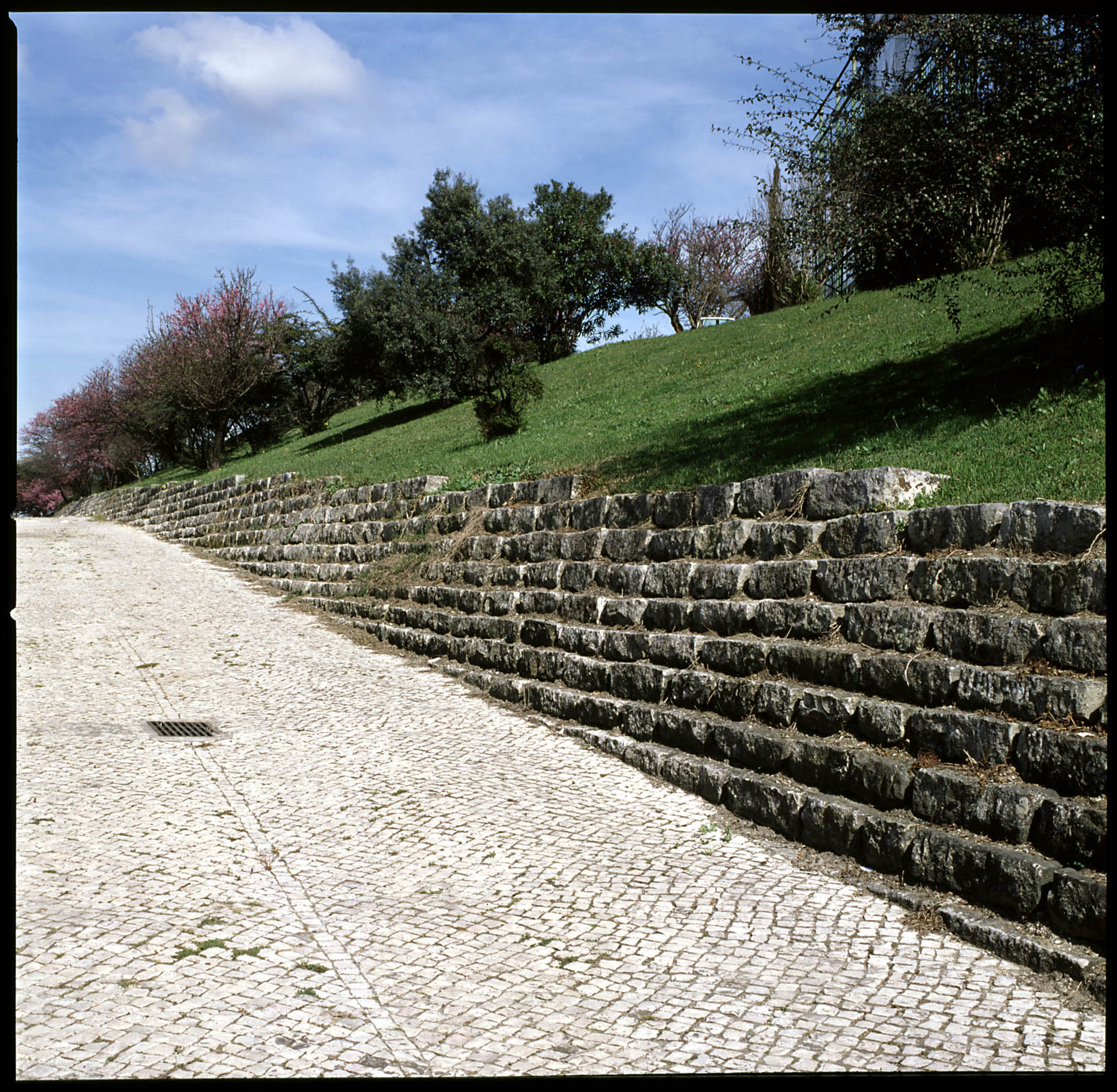
Olivais

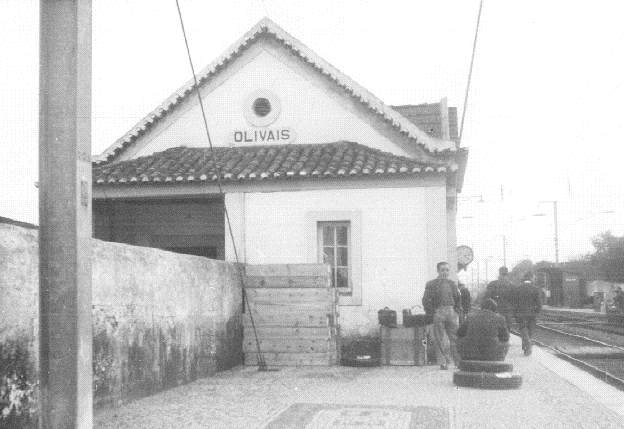
View of the Olivais Railway Station on the Linha do Norte, opened on October 28, 1856, integrating the first section of the railway in Portugal.

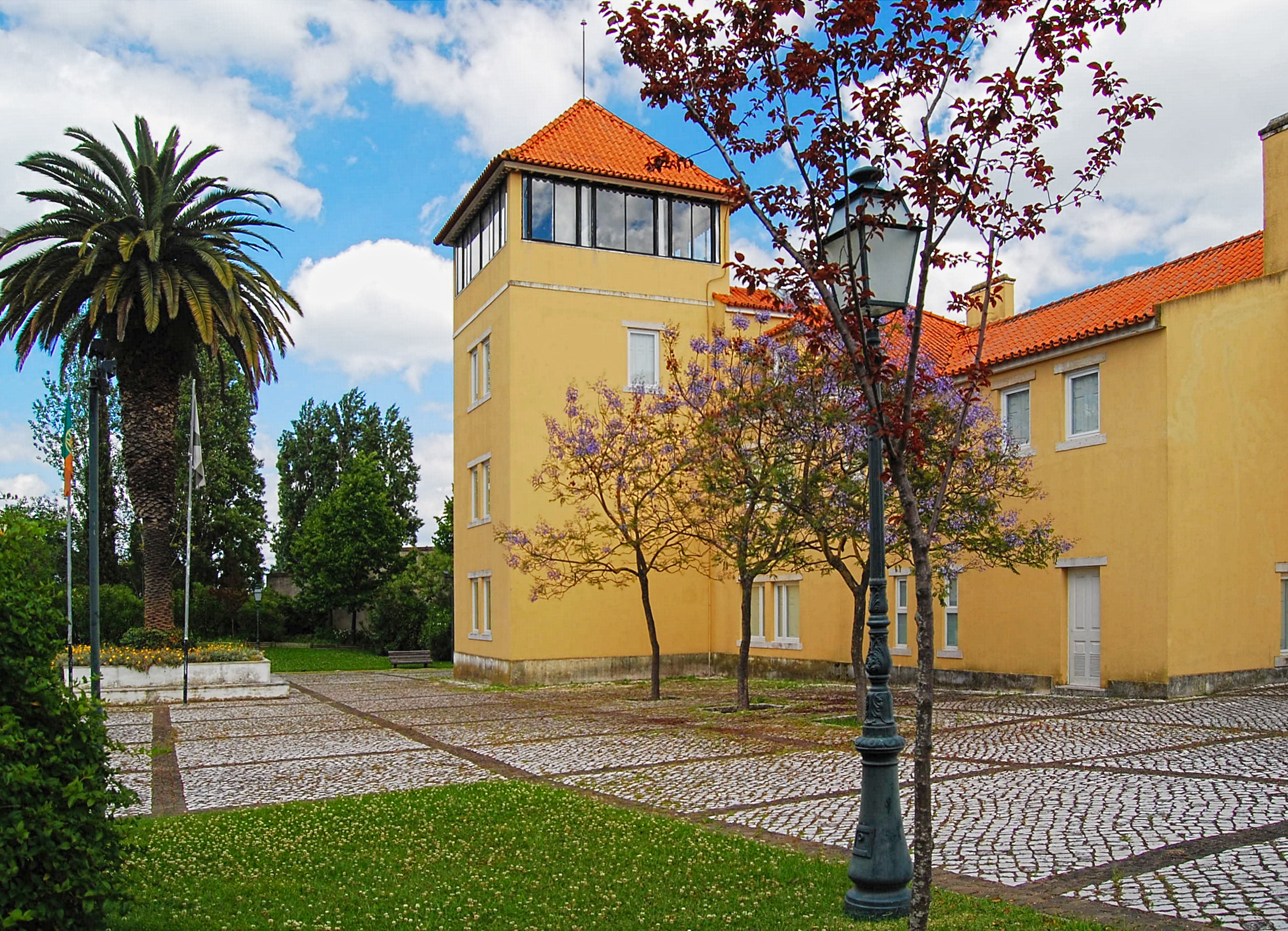
Bedeteca Municipal de Lisboa

Between 1852 and 1886, Santa Maria dos Olivais formed a large municipality, predominantly rural, including 22 civil parishes. It covered an area of approximately 223 square kilometers and had a population of 25,495 inhabitants in 1864, which increased to 29,491 inhabitants by 1878.

Then on July 18, 1885, Lisbon annexed the parishes of Beato, Charneca, Ameixoeira, Lumiar, Campo Grande, and Olivais from the Municipality of Olivais. Following the dissolution of the Belém municipality, the parishes of Carnide and Odivelas were temporarily incorporated into the Municipality of Olivais, albeit for only one year. In 1886, the southernmost parishes were integrated into the city of Lisbon, and in 1887, the municipality's seat was relocated to the town of Loures, thereby formally dissolving the Municipality of Olivais and establishing the new Municipality of Loures. The parish of Santo Estêvão das Galés became part of the Mafra municipality.

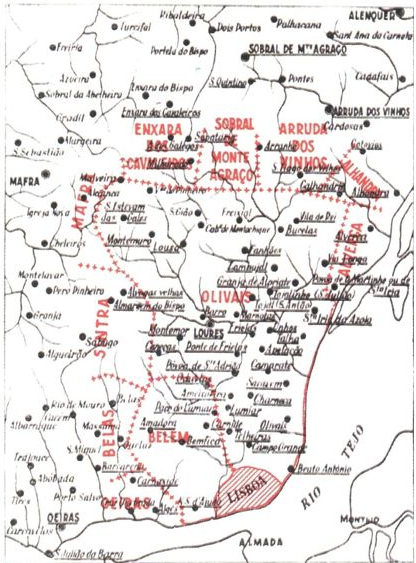
Limits of Olivais municipality

The Olivais Municipal Council convened for the last time in its official capacity at the Town Hall on December 30, 1886. The council members included the following: President, Barão de Vale Formoso, Tomás António Barbosa Leitão; Vice-President, João Antunes Pomba; and Councillors, Manuel Rodrigues Azevedo, Olegário Luís António de Sousa, Joaquim Marques Ferreira, Fernando Silvestre Alves, and Francisco Pereira Pedroso. On January 2, 1887, the council administered the oath of office to the new Municipal Council of Loures in the same location. The first regular session of the new municipality took place on January 7, and the council remaining at the "extinct" Municipality of Olivais until July.

=== Urbanization and new boundaries (1886–2012) ===
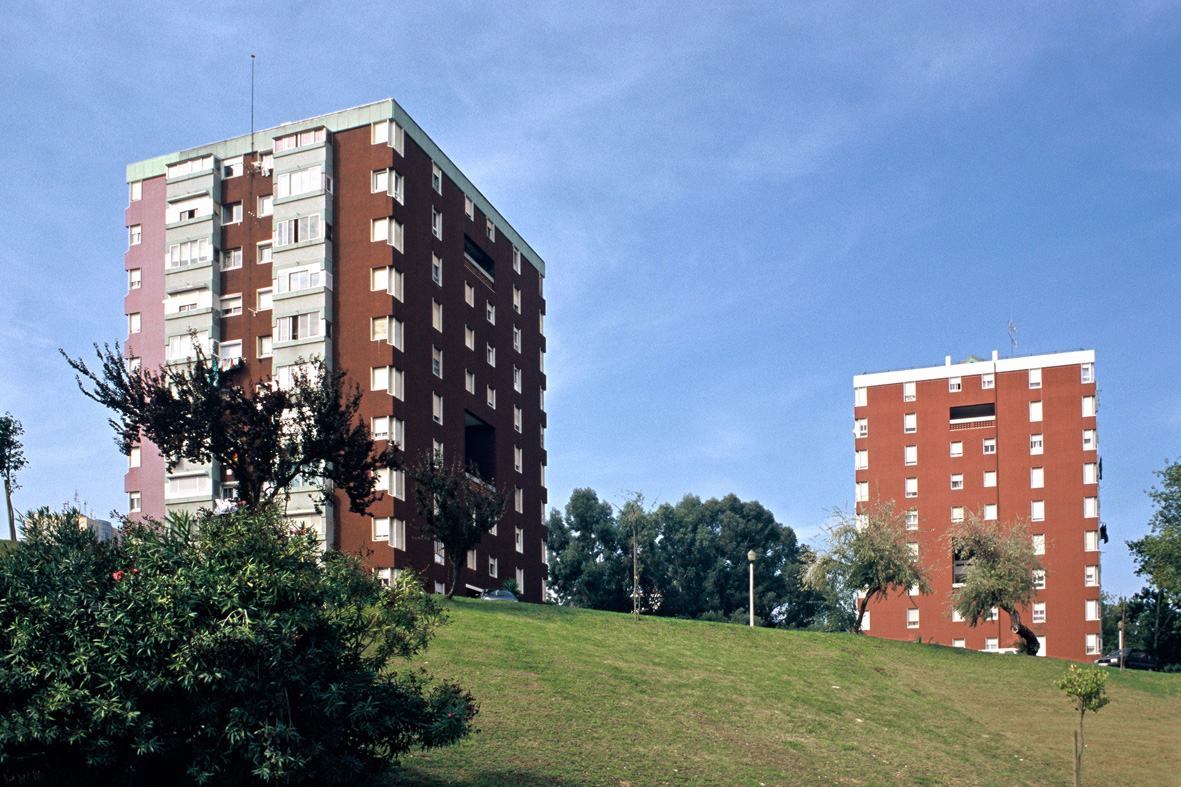
Torres dos Olivais, by Manuel Tainha and Raul Hestnes Ferreira

On September 26, 1895, the extramural part of the Sítio dos Marcos was separated from the Olivais Parish and joined to the Municipality of Loures. Later, by Decree No. 15,222 dated March 23, 1928, the extramural part of the Sítio dos Marcos became the Moscavide Parish.

Established in 1897, already under the administration of the Lisbon municipality, the Cemetery of Olivais, formerly part of the extinct council of Olivais, is situated on the grounds where the Convent of São Cornélio stood in 1674. On the path to the cemetery chapel, the oldest burial plots were constructed, including that of the Viscountess of Olivais, a philanthropist who financed and established a refuge for the most underprivileged children in the area. This refuge still exists today as a daycare and kindergarten under the auspices of the D. Pedro IV Foundation.

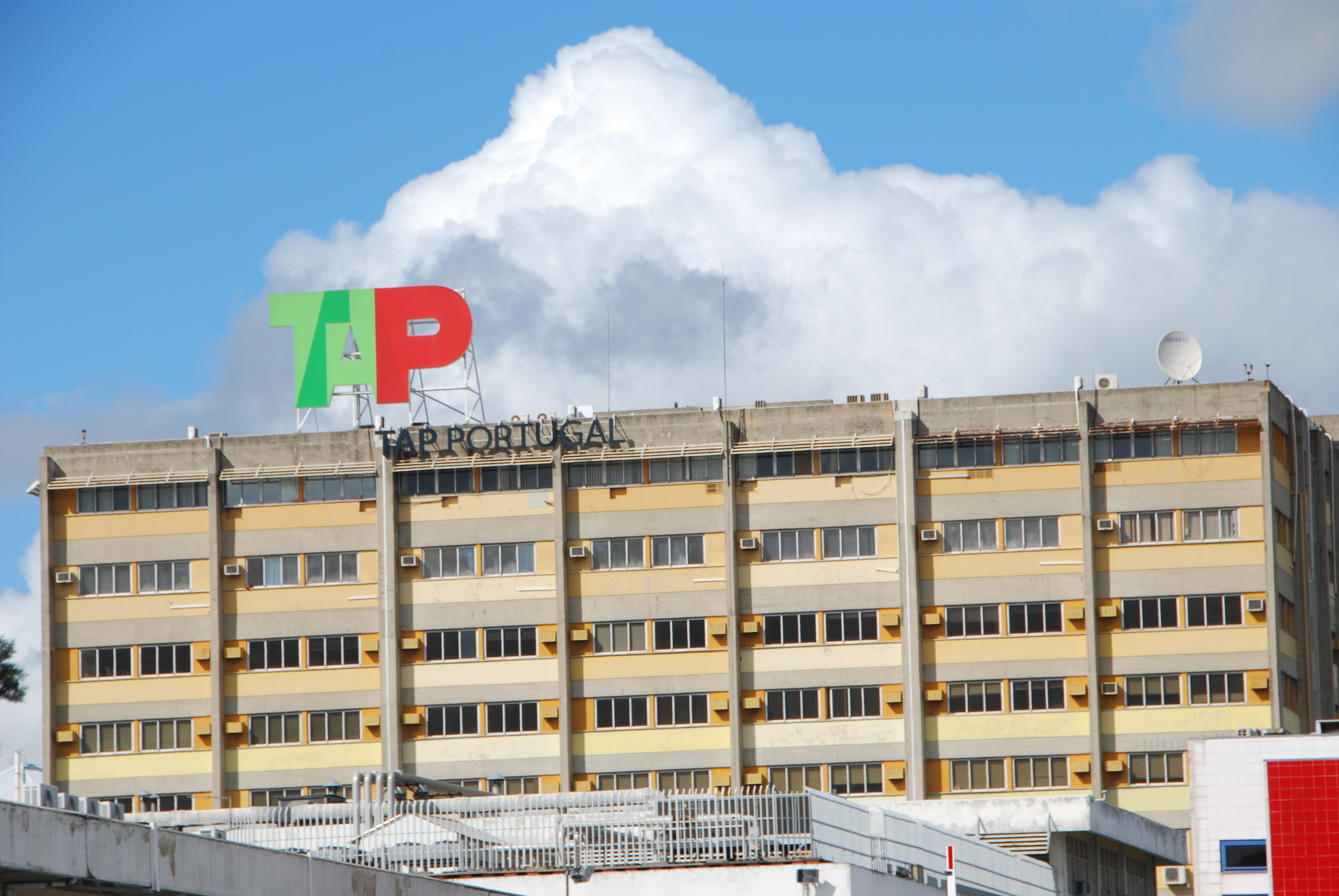
TAP Headquarters

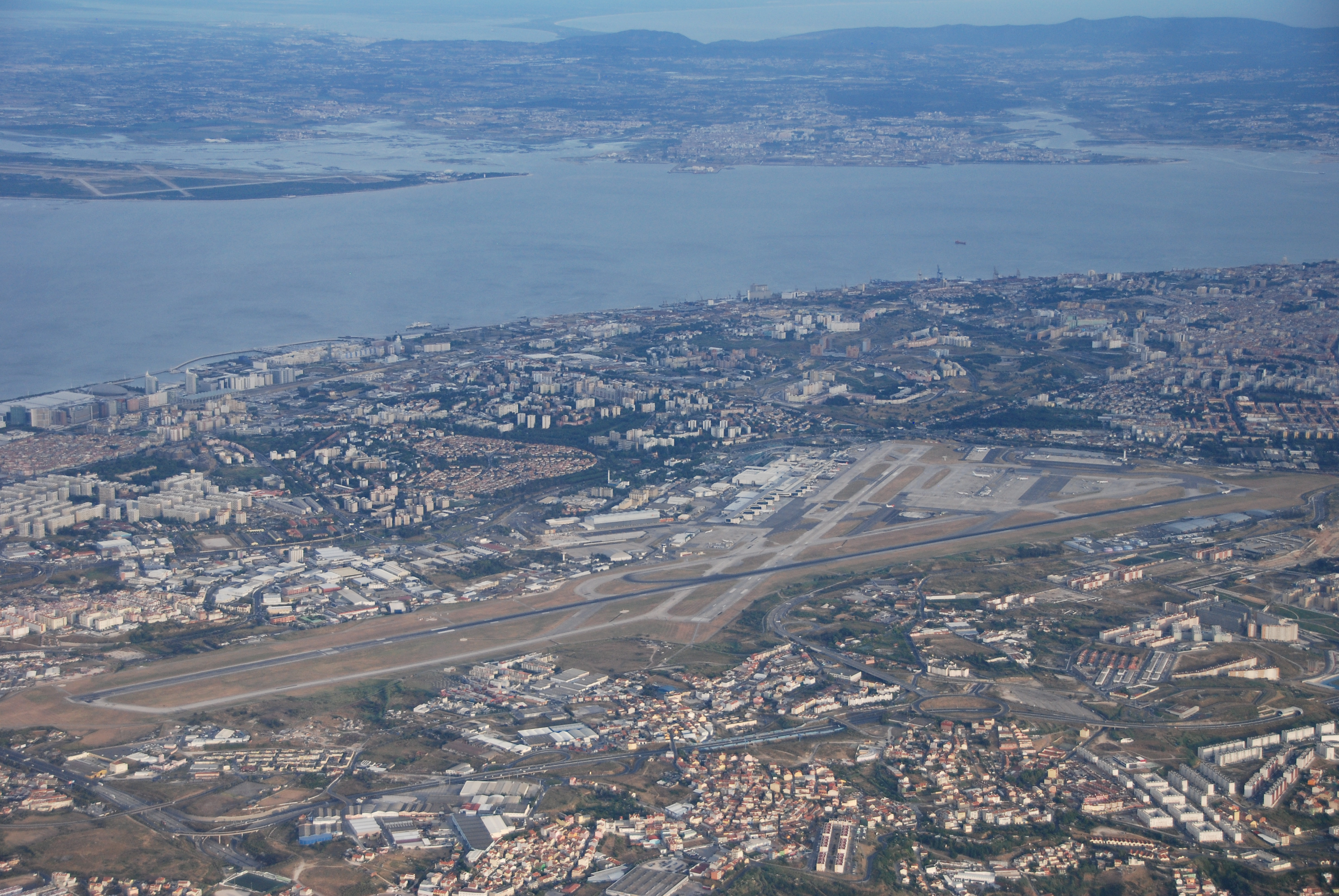
Aerial view of Olivais highlighting Humberto Delgado airport and surrounding areas

Lisbon Airport began construction in 1940. A significant portion of the territory of the Olivais parish is occupied by the airport. Humberto Delgado Airport served approximately 33.65 million passengers in 2023, being the busiest airport in Portugal, the fourth busiest in the Iberian Peninsula and the 12th busiest in Europe.

On February 7, 1959, the administrative division of Lisbon was altered again, creating new parishes and adjusting existing ones. As a result, the massive Olivais parish was reduced to the following boundaries: "Starting from the edge of the Tejo River near Cabo Ruivo, it follows northwest along the axis of Lisbon's Second Circular Road. After passing the airport roundabout, it continues for about 1100 meters along the projected axis of the aforementioned circular road until it reaches the point closest to the same circular road, near the longest runway of Lisbon Airport (N.E.-S.W.). From here, it continues, skirting the airport, along the western side (along the edge of the lands reserved by the Directorate-General of Civil Aviation for the expansion of runways) until it reaches the circumferential road that limits the city and the municipality of Lisbon. It then continues east along the municipal boundary until it reaches the Tejo River. Finally, it turns south, following the riverbank until the starting point."

In the second half of the 20th century the parish experienced sustained demographic growth, and the parish became highly urbanized. During this period many buildings were built, with contribution from renowned Portuguese architects such as Cândido Palma de Melo, José Rafael Botelho and Raul Hestnes Ferreira. The Cine-Teatro da Encarnação, an emblematic building found in Olivais, was inaugurated on April 7, 1968, by then-President Américo Tomás. In 1989 the Escola de Comércio de Lisboa (ECL), an educational institution in Lisbon, offering commerce-related vocational and academic training, was established in the parish. In 1998 Olivais and Cabo Ruivo metro stations opened to the public, being the first two stations of Lisbon metro ever built in Olivais parish. Their inauguration coincided with Expo 1998.

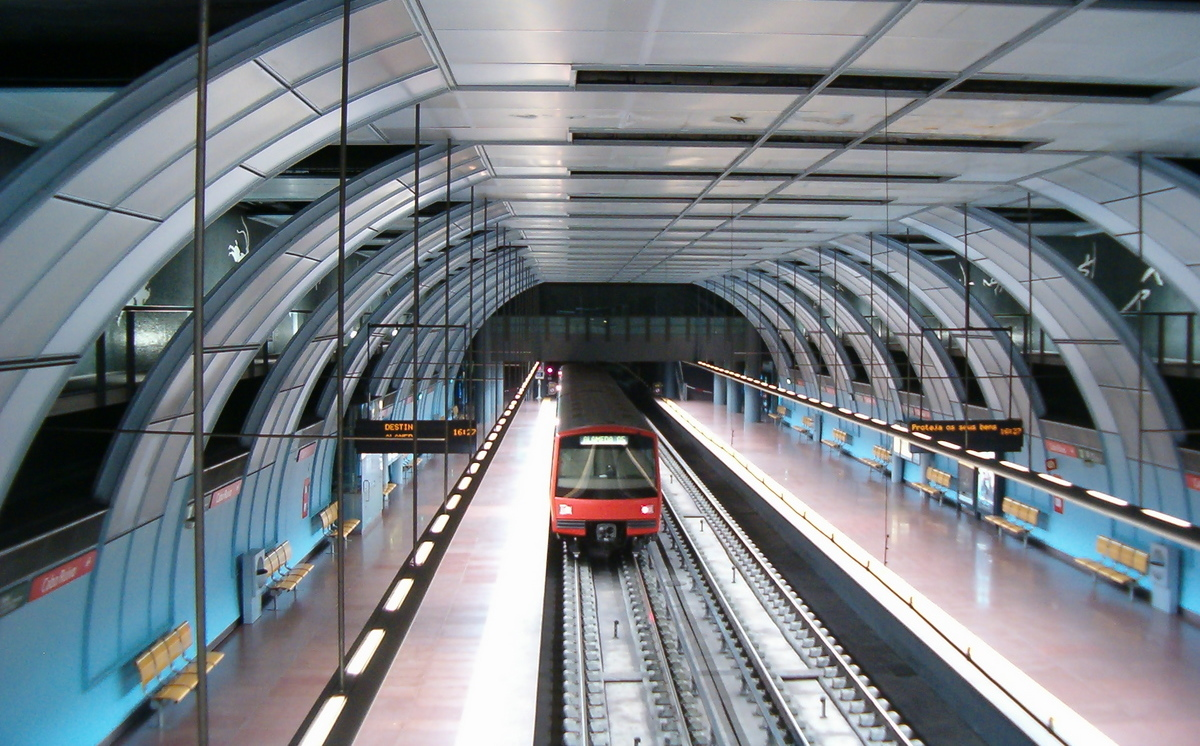
Cabo Ruivo metro station.

With the increase in Lisbon's population, particularly in this parish, the need arose for several expansions of the cemetery and the construction of the city's second crematorium (the first being Alto de São João Cemetery, in Penha de França) in December 2002. In 2009, a third furnace was added, providing the municipality with the necessary infrastructure to timely meet the demand for cremation services. Some prominent figures in Portuguese culture, such as journalist Carlos Pinto Coelho, poet and actress Rosa Lobato de Faria, actors António Feio and Pedro Pinheiro, and musician Zé Pedro have been cremated here.

In 2002 the ancient posto sanitário da Encarnação was rebuilt and redesigned to host the national bromatology laboratory, which screens microbiological and toxic agents to combat their use in biological warfare or terrorist attacks.

=== Infrastructure development (2012 – present) ===
In 2012, as part of the administrative reorganization of the city of Lisbon, the parish of Santa Maria dos Olivais (then renamed to the Parish of Olivais) was subdivided, losing approximately 25% of its territory to the new parish of Parque das Nações, particularly the waterfront area of the former Expo '98.

In 2012, three additional stations of Lisbon metro opened in the parish: Moscavide, Encarnação and Aeroporto. In the same year, the number of passengers passing through Lisbon airport reached 15 million, the highest number ever recorded.

By 2014 the old shanty town of Quinta da Vitória was completely demolished. It was one of the last slums still existing in Lisbon. In the early 1990s, as many as 400 families lived in shacks in this area, between Lisbon and Loures. The first shacks were built in the late 1960s by Portuguese migrants, mainly from the northern region of the country, but the main growth of the neighborhood occurred after the independence of the African countries formerly colonized by Portugal. There was an initial peak in growth in the late 1970s and a second peak in the early 1980s, primarily by Hindus from Mozambique who fled due to the escalation of the civil war. By the 1990s, Quinta da Vitória was just one of the hundreds of shantytowns found in Lisbon. Thanks to heavy public investment towards social neighbourhoods in the late 1990s and early 2000s, there are currently no slums in Olivais.

== Demographics ==
=== Historical resident population (before the 2012 Administrative Reform) ===
Historical population
Year	Pop.	±%
1960	11,896	—
1970	55,216	+364.2%
1981	61,941	+12.2%
1991	51,367	−17.1%
2001	46,410	−9.7%
2011	51,036	+10.0%
2011 (adj.)	33,788	−33.8%
2021	32,179	−4.8%
Source: INE

Olivais' new boundaries after the 2012 administrative reform

The following table shows the resident population of the parish of Olivais according to censuses from 1960 to 2021. Between 1960 and 1981, the parish population skyrocketed by +420%. This rapid growth was due to the urbanisation of Olivais Sul, Olivais Norte, and Encarnação.

Between 1981 and 2001, the population shrunk by 15,531 people, due to shrinking family sizes and migration of young couples towards other municipalities on the outskirts of Lisbon.

Interestingly, the population recorded a growth between 2001 and 2011, although this is mainly due to the urbanisation of Parque das Nações following the 1998 Expo. This area has not been a part of Olivais since 2012. In fact, adjusting the population of the parish recorded in the 2011 census to the new boundaries, 33.8% of the parish's inhabited areas were transferred to other freguesias, mostly Parque das Nações.

== Economy ==
As of 2021, there were 1,423 unemployed residents of the parish of Olivais (an unemployment rate of 9.80%, significantly higher than the average in Lisbon and Portugal as a whole); among youth aged 15 to 24, the unemployment rate in 2021 was at 25.98%, 39.08% higher than in the rest of the country. Meanwhile, 13,097 residents were employed, of which 78.38% were employees and 18.94% were independent workers. Below is a table showing the employment rate per age group:

2021 census data	Age group								
2021 census data	20–24	25–29	30–34	35–39	40–44	45–49	50–54	55–59	60–64
Share of people in employment	37.08%	72.77%	78.98%	80.82%	81.00%	77.86%	75.69%	68.25%	51.11%

Companies with head offices in Santa Maria dos Olivais and Portela Airport include TAP Portugal and CTT Correios de Portugal, S.A.

== Landmarks ==
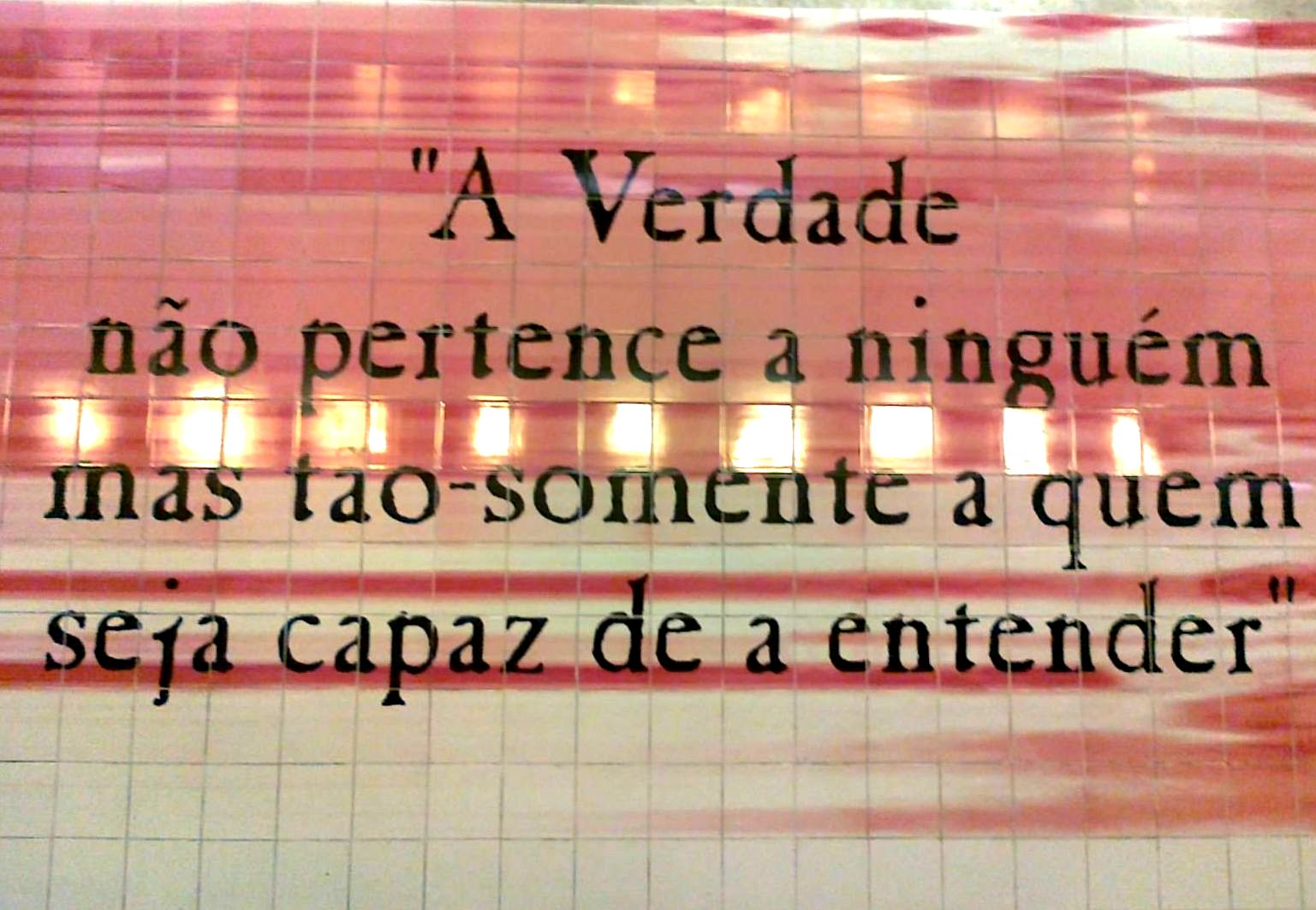
Modern Azulejos in Olivais

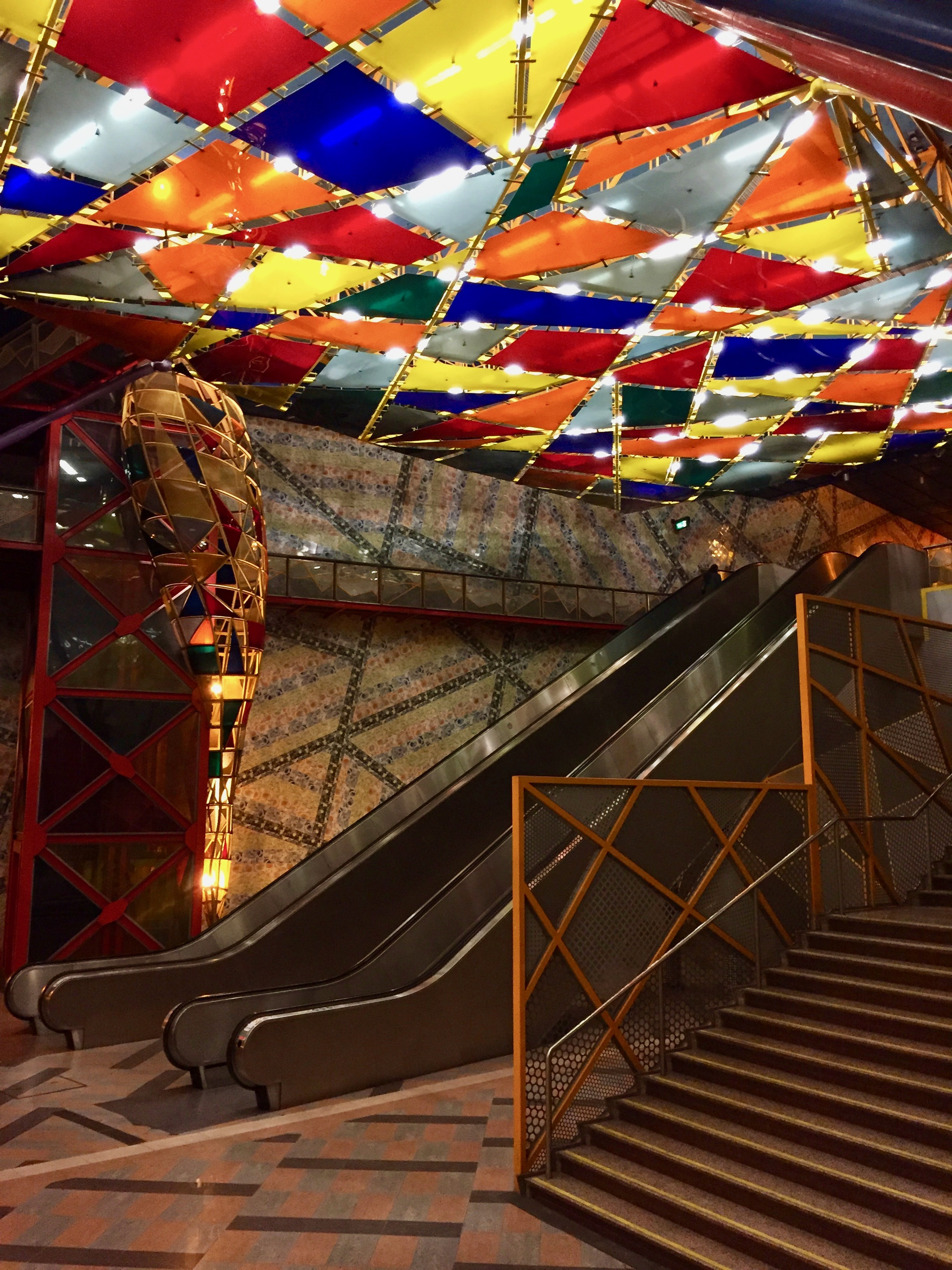
Olaias metro station

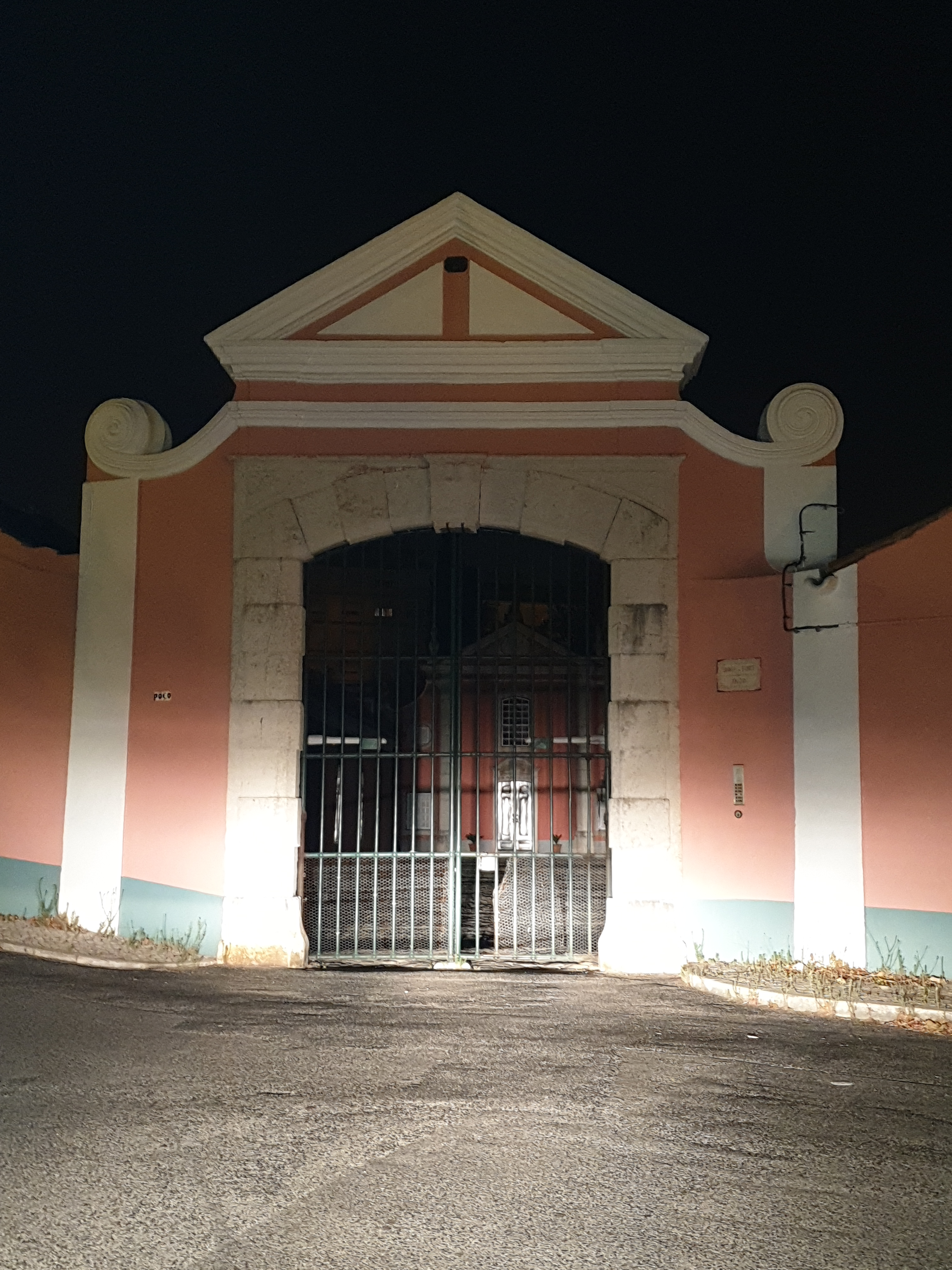
Quinta da fonte

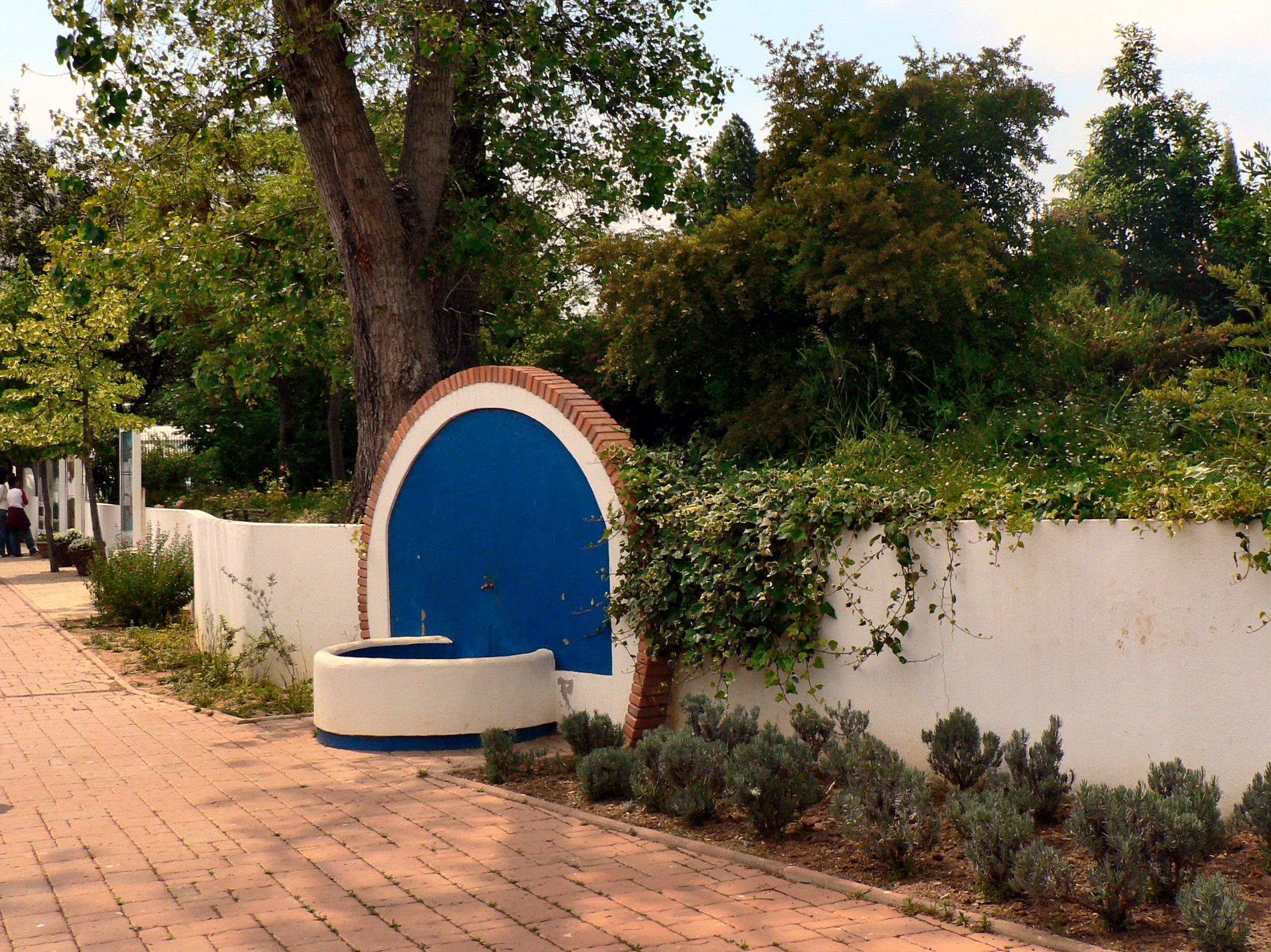
Waterfountain in Olivais

Local landmarks include:

- A Varina: 1965 statue by José Laranjeira Santo dedicated to varinas, women associated with selling fish and other fresh produce in the markets and streets of Lisbon. They carry baskets or buckets filled with fresh fish, seafood, and other delicacies, selling them to local residents. They are an iconic figure of Lisbon's culture, representing the authenticity and tradition of the city
- António Damásio High school: Built in 2011, it was distinguished with an Honorable Mention in the 2011 Valmor and Municipal Architecture Prize
- Bartolomeu de Gusmão statue: Monument inaugurated in 1973
- Capela da Quinta da Fonte do Anjo
- Casa da Fonte do Anjo
- Casa da Quinta do Policarpo, also known as Bengazil Palace, was built on the initiative of the politician and entrepreneur Policarpo José Machado (1796–1875)
- Conjunto da Praça da Viscondessa dos Olivais
- Dracaena draco L: Green monument
- Edifício da Faculdade de Medicina Veterinária: Modern building dating from 1999 which received an Honorable Mention for the 1999 Valmor Prize
- Fernando Pessoa statue: Monument inaugurated in 1988
- Igreja Catolica Missionários da Consolata – Lisboa: Church of a Catholic organization operating in Portugal since 1944
- Igreja de Nossa Senhora da Conceição Olivais Sul: Church built in 1988 in modernist style
- Igreja de São José dos Olivais: Church built in 1960
- João Ferreira do Amaral statue: Statue built in Macau in 1940, after the handover of Macau in 1999, it was decided it ought to be put in Olivais
- Lagunaria patersonii (Andrewes) G. Don: Green monument
- Lisbon Airport
- Monumentos "As Oliveiras": Monument designed in 1989 by Samuel Azavey Torres de Carvalho, unveiled in 1990 on Cidade de Bissau Street, Olivais-Sul, by Lisbon City Council. Standing 5m tall, it is made of iron plates resembling olive trees, arranged in two vertical planes, allowing an iron tree to fit like a puzzle
- Movimento dos Capitães de Abril: The sculpture in Olivais Norte, Lisbon, commemorates the clandestine meeting of the April Captains Movement on February 5, 1974. Unveiled on February 5, 1999, it depicts military figures and carnations
- Museu ANA – Museu do ar: Small museum of 700 square meters that illustrates the history of the airport; it is also a "showroom" for the Museu do Ar in Alverca, more than 10 times bigger, and in Sintra.
- Palácio do Contador-Mor, a pedagogic farm
- Quinta da Bica
- Quinta da Fonte do Anjo: A noble residence in Pombaline style built in the second half of the 18th century.
- Parque do Vale do Silêncio, designed by Manuel de Sousa da Câmara in 1950
- Recriação statue: Monument inaugurated in 1989
- Rotunda do Relógio
- Rua dos Eucaliptos Geomonument
- Statue of Saint Cristopher: Monument inaugurated in 1969
- Um olhar sobre a Cidade statue: Monument inaugurated in 2013

== Culture ==
Cultural associations found in the parish include a large Parque Agrícola (Agricultural Park) and the Portuguese Poets Association headquarters. The Innovation and Design Building, a cultural space with coworking areas, was opened in Olivais Sul in 2022.

== Notable people ==
- João Morais Leitão (1938–2006): Portuguese politician and lawyer
- Simone de Oliveira (1938): Portuguese singer of São Tomé and Príncipe and Belgian descent, who represented her country twice at the Eurovision Song Contest
- Hélder Tavares (1989): Portuguese footballer of Cape Verdean descent
