= Oriente Station =

Oriente Station may refer to:

- Gare do Oriente, a railway station in Lisbon, Portugal
- Oriente Station (Lisbon Metro), a metro station in Lisbon, Portugal
