= Lisbon Metro Red Line =

Metro line in Lisbon, Portugal

Red Line
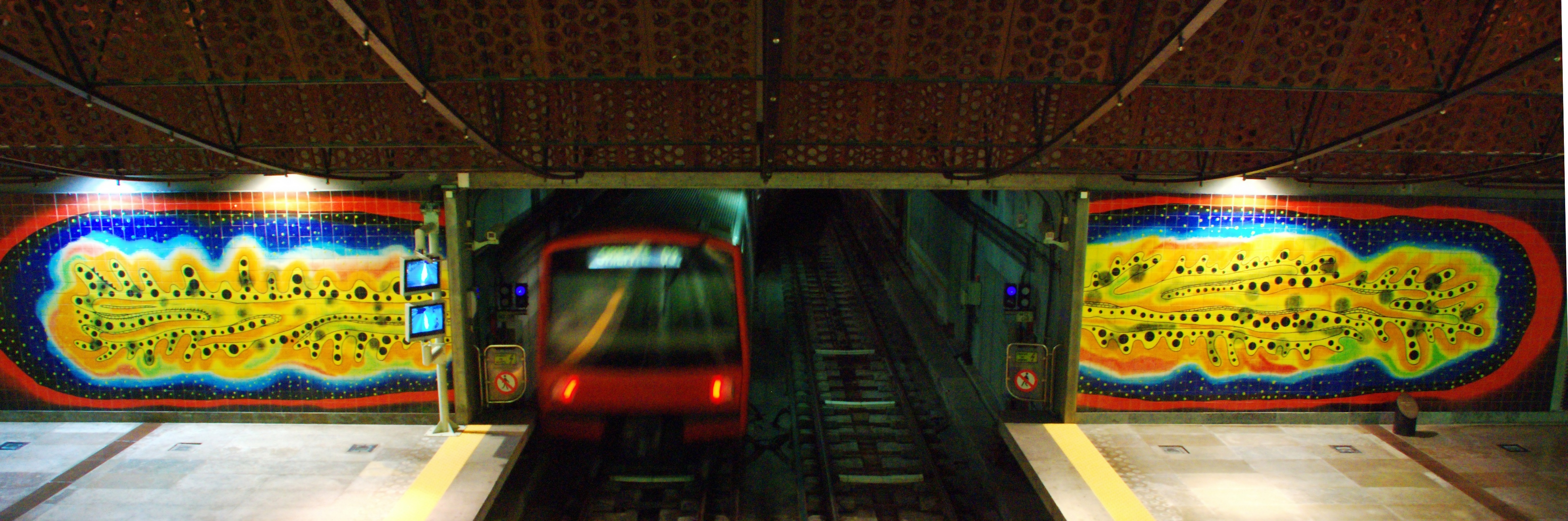
- Lisbon metro station Oriente

Overview
- Other name: Orient Line
- Native name: Linha Vermelha
- Owner: Government-owned corporation
- Locale: Lisbon, Portugal
- Termini: São Sebastião; Aeroporto
- Connecting lines: Yellow Line Blue Line Green Line
- Stations: 12

Service
- Type: Rapid Transit
- System: Metropolitano de Lisboa
- Operator(s): Metropolitano de Lisboa, EPE
- Rolling stock: ML90, ML95, ML97, ML99

History
- Opened: 19 May 1998 (28 years ago)
- Last extension: 2012

Technical
- Line length: 10 km (6.2 mi)
- Character: Underground subway
- Track gauge: 1,435 mm (4 ft 8 1/2 in) standard gauge
- Electrification: 750 V DC third rail
Route map
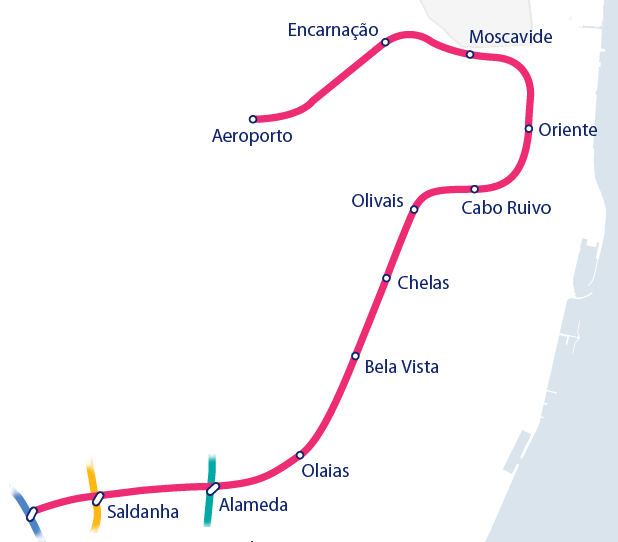
Detailed diagram

The Red Line (Portuguese: Linha Vermelha) or Orient Line (Portuguese: Linha do Oriente) is one of the four lines of the Lisbon Metro.

Serving the northeast of the city, the line was opened in May 1998, as part of the infrastructure built to serve Expo '98. In 2009, the line was extended west to connect to the Yellow and Blue lines. In 2012, the line was extended to serve Lisbon Airport.

== Stations ==
Code	Station name	Distance (km)		Transfers	Location	
Code	Station name	Inter- station	Total	Transfers	Location	
SS	São Sebastião	—N/a	0.0	Blue Line	Avenidas Novas	Lisbon
SA	Saldanha	0.6	0.6	Yellow Line	Avenidas Novas	Lisbon
AM	Alameda	1.3	1.9	Green Line	Areeiro	Lisbon
OL	Olaias	0.8	2.7		Areeiro	Lisbon
BV	Bela Vista	1.3	4.0		Marvila	Lisbon
CH	Chelas	0.8	4.8		Marvila	Lisbon
OS	Olivais	0.7	5.5		Olivais	Lisbon
CR	Cabo Ruivo	0.6	6.1		Parque das Nações	Lisbon
OR	Oriente	0.8	6.9	Azambuja Line, Sintra Line, Fertagus (Oriente); Oriente bus terminal	Parque das Nações	Lisbon
MO	Moscavide	1.0	7.9		Parque das Nações	Lisbon
EN	Encarnação	0.8	8.7		Olivais	Lisbon
AP	Aeroporto	1.4	10.3	Lisbon Humberto Delgado Airport	Olivais	Lisbon

== Frequency ==
	Summer timetable		Winter timetable	
	Time	Headway	Time	Headway
Working days	06:30 - 07:10 07:10 - 09:45 09:45 - 16:30 16:30 - 19:15 19:15 - 20:30 20:30 - 22:30 22:30 - 01:05	09' 45" 06' 15" 07' 00" 06' 15" 07' 05" 07' 55" 09' 25"'	06:30 - 07:10 07:10 - 09:15 09:15 - 16:30 16:30 - 19:15 19:15 - 20:30 20:30 - 22:30 22:30 - 01:05	09' 45" 06' 15" 07' 00" 06' 15" 07' 05" 07' 55" 09' 25"
Weekends and holidays	06:30 - 22:15 22:15 - 00:00 00:00 - 01:05	08' 00' 09' 35" 09' 25"	06:30 - 22:15 22:15 - 00:00 00:00 - 01:05	08' 00' 09' 35" 09' 25"

== Chronology ==
- 19 May 1998: Opening of the red line with the following stations: Alameda, Olaias, Bela Vista, Chelas and Oriente.
- 18 July 1998: Opening of the Cabo Ruivo station.
- 7 November 1998: Opening of the Olivais station.
- 29 August 2009: Opening of the Saldanha and São Sebastião stations. Line route: São Sebastião - Oriente.
- 17 July 2012: Opening of the Moscavide, Encarnação and Aeroporto stations. Line route: São Sebastião - Aeroporto.

== Future extension ==
As of 2024, Lisbon Metro plans to extend the line west towards Oeiras.

== See also ==
- List of Lisbon metro stations
