= Chelas Station =

Metro station in Lisbon, Portugal

Chelas Metro
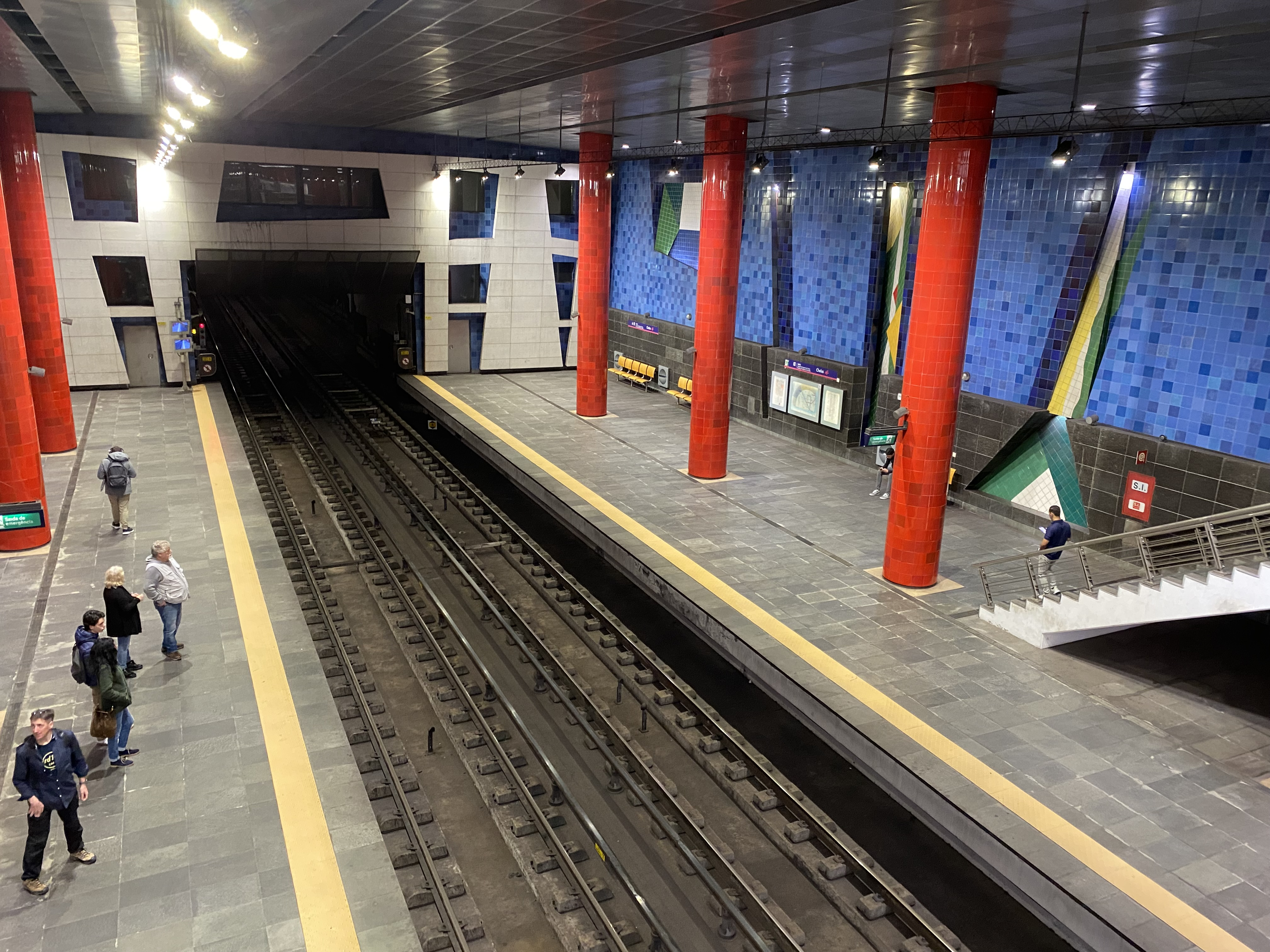

General information
- Location: Av. Dr. Augusto de Castro, Lisbon; Portugal
- Coordinates: 38°45′16″N 9°06′59″W
- Owner: Government-owned corporation
- Operator: Metropolitano de Lisboa, EPE
- Line: Red Line
- Platforms: 2 side platforms
- Tracks: 2

Construction
- Structure type: Underground
- Accessible: yes
- Architect: Ana Nascimento

Other information
- Station code: CH
- Fare zone: L

History
- Opened: 19 May 1998 (28 years ago)

Services
Preceding station	Lisbon Metro	Following station
Bela Vista towards São Sebastião	Red Line	Olivais towards Aeroporto
Route map
Location

Chelas Metro is a metro station on the Red Line of the Lisbon Metro. The station is located in Marvila, at the intersection of Avenida Doutor Augusto de Castro and Rua Engenheiro Rodrigues de Carvalho, close to the Instituto Superior de Engenharia de Lisboa.

== History ==
The project was designed by architect Ana Nascimento with installation art by plastic artist Jorge Martins.

== Connections ==
=== Urban buses ===
==== Carris ====
- 208 Cais do Sodré ⇄ Estação Oriente (Interface) (morning service)
- 718 ISEL ⇄ Al. Afonso Henriques
- 749 ISEL ⇄ Estação Entrecampos
- 755 Poço do Bispo ⇄ Sete Rios
- 759 Restauradores ⇄ Estação Oriente (Interface)
- 794 Terreiro do Paço ⇄ Estação Oriente (Interface)

== See also ==
- List of Lisbon metro stations
