= Hélder Tavares =

Portuguese footballer

Personal information
- Full name: Hélder Luís Lopes Vieira Tavares
- Date of birth: 26 December 1989 (age 36)
- Place of birth: Olivais, Portugal
- Height: 1.80 m (5 ft 11 in)
- Position: Midfielder

Team information
- Current team: Tondela
- Number: 8

Youth career
- 2003–2007: Operário Lisboa
- 2007–2008: Olivais Moscavide

Senior career*
Years	Team	Apps	(Gls)
2008–2010	Tojal	23	(0)
2010–2012	Portosantense	51	(4)
2012–2013	Pinhalnovense	29	(1)
2013–2014	Beira-Mar	40	(1)
2014–2015	Oțelul Galați	25	(1)
2015–2019	Tondela	102	(2)
2019–2020	Altay	35	(1)
2020	Giresunspor	4	(0)
2021–2023	Voluntari	78	(1)
2023–	Tondela	75	(1)

International career
2017–2021	Cape Verde	14	(0)
- * Club domestic league appearances and goals as of 25 May 2026

Hélder Luís Lopes Vieira Tavares (born 26 December 1989) is a professional footballer who plays as a midfielder for Primeira Liga club Tondela. Born in Portugal, he represented the Cape Verdean national team, earning 14 caps.

== Club career ==
Born in Olivais, Lisbon of Cape Verdean descent, Tavares spent his first years as a senior in Portuguese amateur football. In the summer of 2013, aged nearly 24, he signed with Beira-Mar in the second division from Pinhalnovense in the third.

Tavares made his professional debut on 27 July 2013, playing the full 90 minutes in a 1–0 away loss against Portimonense in the first round of the Taça da Liga. He first appeared in division two on 12 August, featuring the entire 2–3 home defeat to Porto B.

In the 2015 off-season, after one year in Romania with Oțelul Galați, Tavares joined Primeira Liga club Tondela. His first match in the Portuguese top tier occurred on 14 August when he started an eventual 1–2 home loss against Sporting CP, and he finished his debut season with 30 appearances as his team managed to avoid relegation. In June 2016, he renewed his contract for another year.

In January 2019, as his link was due to expire on 30 June, Tavares was sold to Altay of the Turkish TFF First League and agreed to a one-and-a-half-year deal.

== International career ==
Tavares made his debut for Cape Verde on 28 March 2017, in a friendly against Luxembourg.

=== International statistics ===
National team	Year	Apps	Goals
Cape Verde	2017	3	0
Cape Verde	2018	3	0
Cape Verde	2019	4	0
Cape Verde	2020	2	0
Cape Verde	2021	2	0
Total		14	0

== Honours ==
Tondela

- Liga Portugal 2: 2024–25
