= Olivais Station =

Metro station in Lisbon, Portugal

Olivais
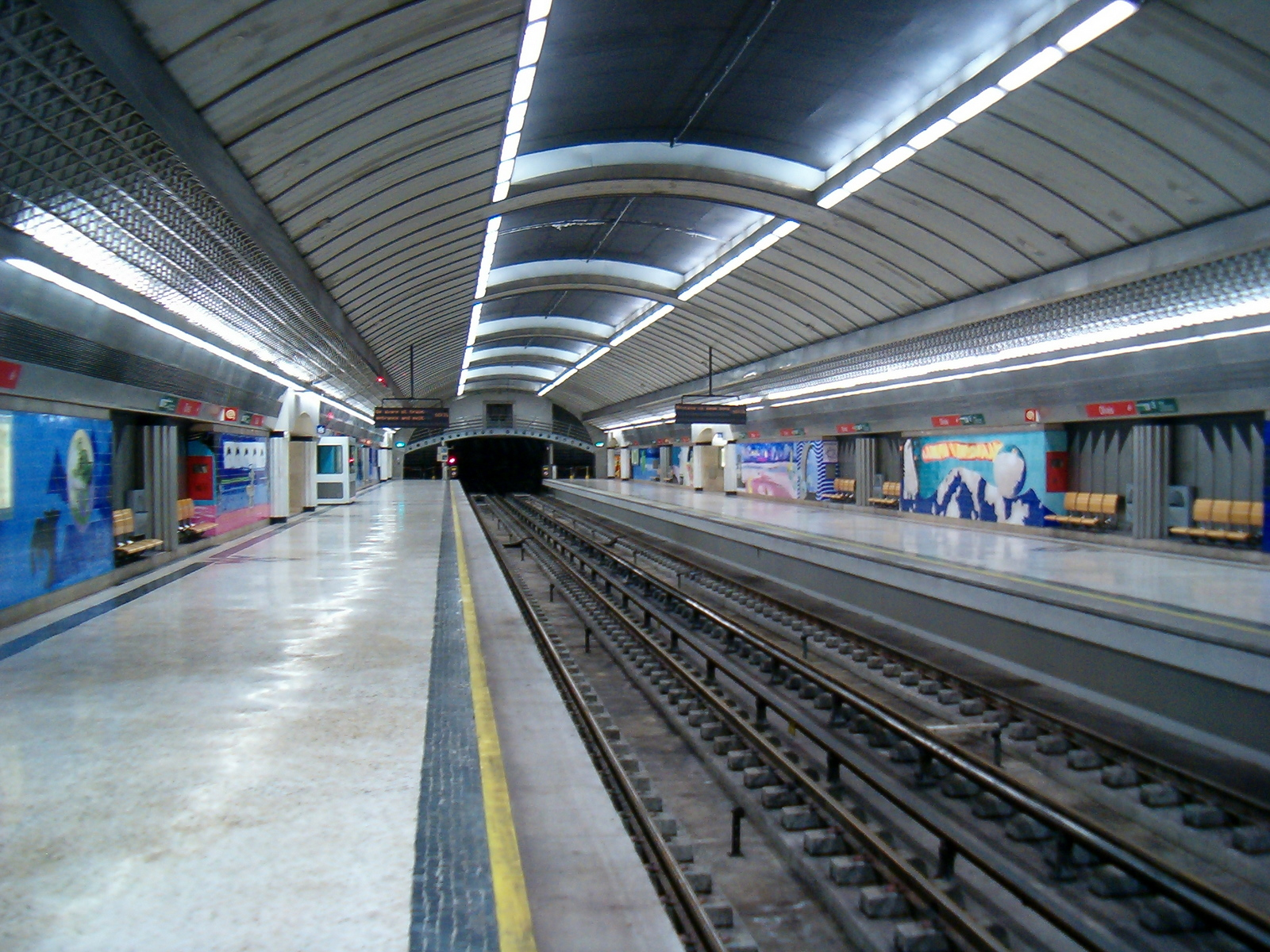

General information
- Location: Rua Cidade de Bissau, Lisbon; Portugal
- Coordinates: 38°45′36″N 9°06′45″W
- Owner: Government-owned corporation
- Operator: Metropolitano de Lisboa, EPE
- Line: Red Line
- Platforms: 2 side platforms
- Tracks: 2

Construction
- Structure type: Underground
- Depth: 36 m (118 ft)
- Accessible: yes
- Architect: Rui Cardim

Other information
- Station code: OS
- Fare zone: L

History
- Opened: November 7, 1998 (27 years ago)

Services
Preceding station	Lisbon Metro	Following station
Chelas towards São Sebastião	Red Line	Cabo Ruivo towards Aeroporto
Route map
Location

Olivais is a station on the Red Line of the Lisbon Metro. The station is located under Rua Cidade de Bissau, at the junction with Rua Cidade de Luanda.

== History ==
The architectural design is by Rui Cardim with installation art by plastic artists Nuno de Siqueira and Cecilia de Sousa.

== Connections ==
=== Urban buses ===
==== Carris ====
- 708 Martim Moniz ⇄ Parque das Nações Norte
- 759 Restauradores ⇄ Estação Oriente (Interface)
- 779 Centro Comercial dos Olivais - circulação
- 781 Cais do Sodré ⇄ Prior Velho

== See also ==
- List of Lisbon metro stations
