= Encarnação Station =

Metro station in Lisbon, Portugal

Encarnação
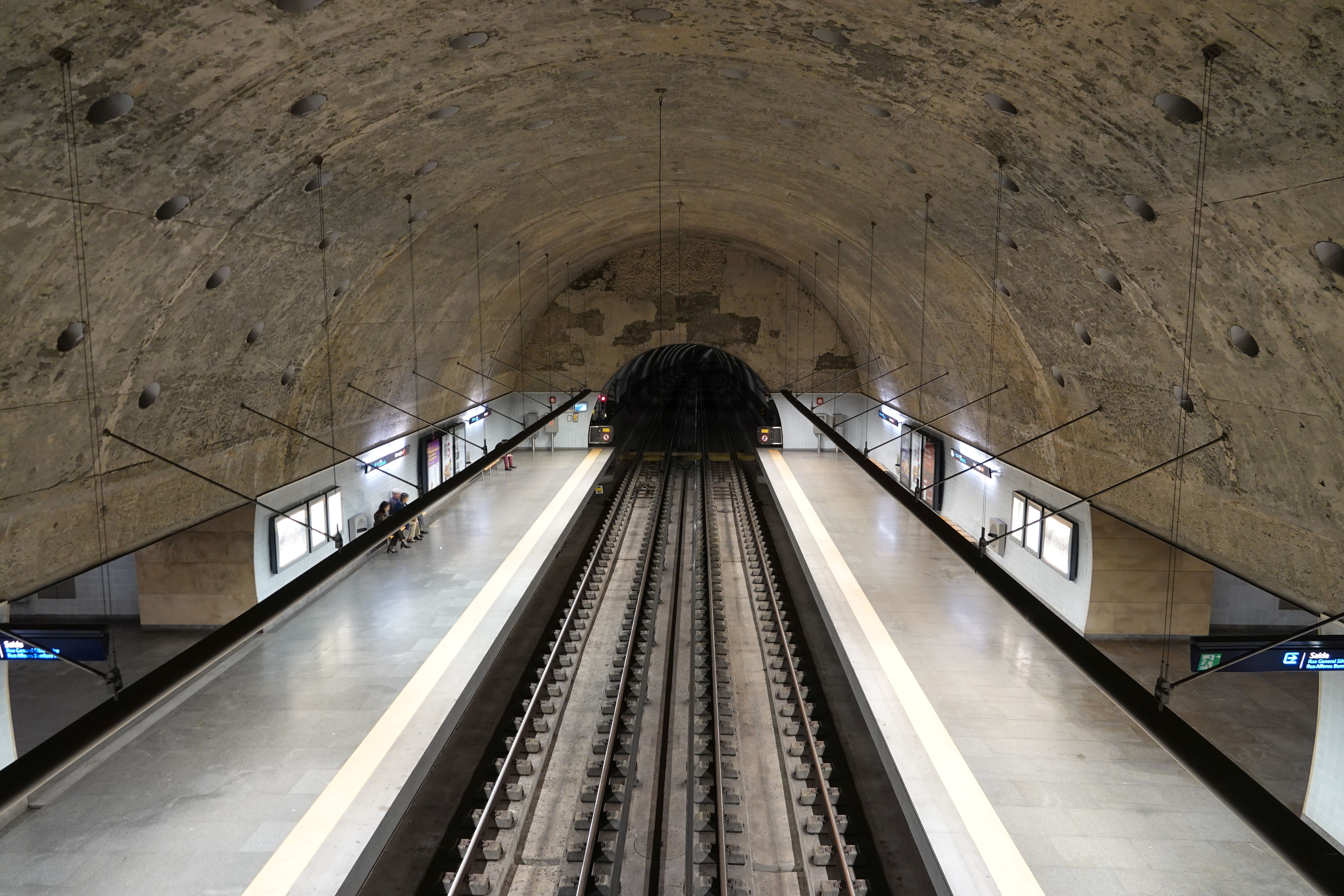

General information
- Location: Rua General Silva Freire, Lisbon; Portugal
- Coordinates: 38°46′29″N 9°06′55″W
- Owner: Government-owned corporation
- Operator: Metropolitano de Lisboa, EPE
- Line: Red Line
- Platforms: 2 side platforms
- Tracks: 2

Construction
- Structure type: Underground
- Accessible: yes
- Architect: Alberto Barradas

Other information
- Station code: EN
- Fare zone: L

History
- Opened: 17 July 2012 (14 years ago)

Services
Preceding station	Lisbon Metro	Following station
Moscavide towards São Sebastião	Red Line	Aeroporto Terminus
Route map
Location

Encarnação is a station on the Red Line of the Lisbon Metro. The station is located under Rua General Silva Freire in the parish of Encarnação, a densely populated residential neighbourhood of northern Lisbon.

The station, designed by the architect Alberto Barradas, opened on 17 July 2012 in conjunction with the Moscavide and Aeroporto stations, as part of the expansion of the line to serve Lisbon Portela Airport.

== Connections ==
=== Urban buses ===
==== Carris ====
- 705 Estação Oriente (Interface) ⇄ Estação Roma-Areeiro
- 722 Praça de Londres ⇄ Portela - Rua dos Escritores
- 725 Estação Oriente (Interface) ⇄ Prior Velho - Rua Maestro Lopes Graça
- 759 Restauradores ⇄ Estação Oriente (Interface)
- 779 Centro Comercial dos Olivais - circulação
- 781 Cais do Sodré ⇄ Prior Velho

== See also ==
- List of Lisbon metro stations
