= Olaias Station =

Metro station in Lisbon, Portugal

Olaias
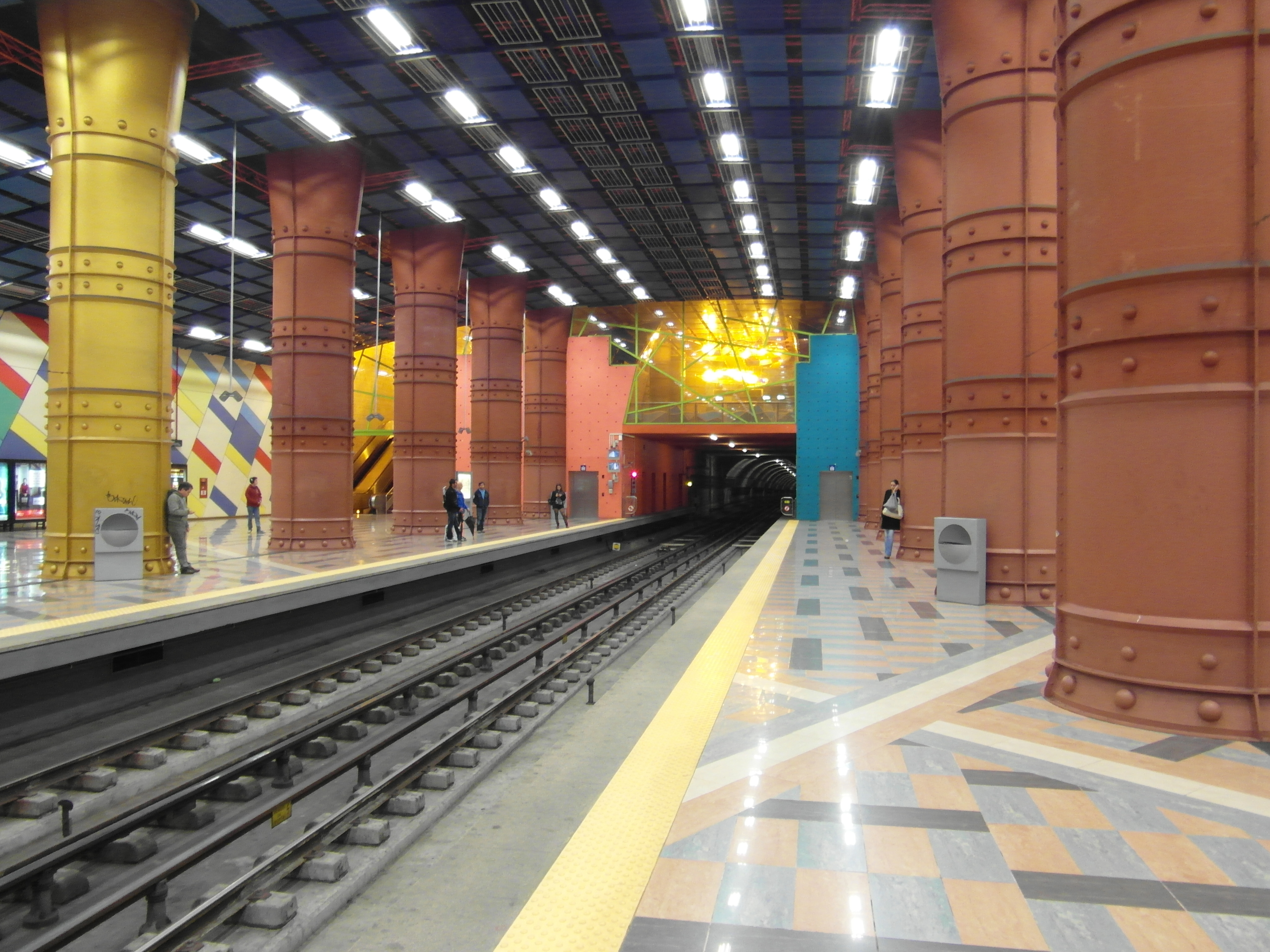

General information
- Location: Rua de Olivença, Lisbon; Portugal
- Coordinates: 38°44′21″N 9°07′27″W
- Owner: Government-owned corporation
- Operator: Metropolitano de Lisboa, EPE
- Line: Red Line
- Platforms: 2 side platforms
- Tracks: 2

Construction
- Structure type: Underground
- Accessible: yes
- Architect: Tomás Taveira

Other information
- Station code: OL
- Fare zone: L

History
- Opened: May 19, 1998 (28 years ago)

Services
Preceding station	Lisbon Metro	Following station
Alameda towards São Sebastião	Red Line	Bela Vista towards Aeroporto
Route map
Location

Olaias is a station on the Red Line of the Lisbon Metro. The station is located on Rua de Olivença southeast of Avenida Engenheiro Arantes e Oliveira in the Olaias neighbourhood to the north east of central Lisbon.

== History ==
The architectural design is by Tomás Taveira and the installation art was created by Pedro Cabrita Reis, Graça Pereira Coutinho, Pedro Calapez and Rui Sanchez.

== Connections ==
=== Urban buses ===
==== Carris ====
- 756 Olaias ⇄ Rua da Junqueira
- 793 Marvila ⇄ Estação Roma-Areeiro

== See also ==
- List of Lisbon metro stations
