= Cabo Ruivo Station =

Metro station in Lisbon, Portugal

Cabo Ruivo
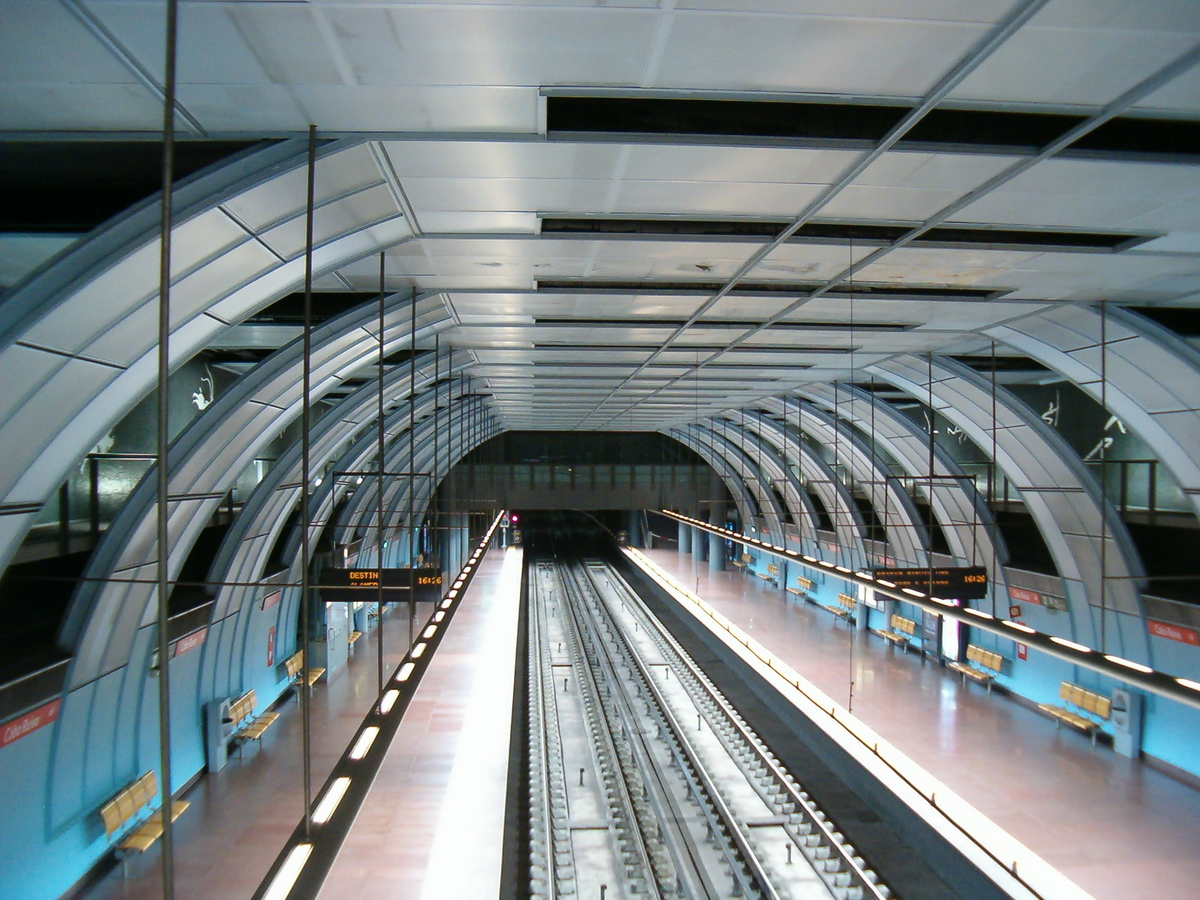

General information
- Location: Av. Padua, Lisbon; Portugal
- Coordinates: 38°45′46″N 9°06′14″W
- Owner: Government-owned corporation
- Operator: Metropolitano de Lisboa, EPE
- Line: Red Line
- Platforms: 2 side platforms
- Tracks: 2

Construction
- Structure type: Underground
- Accessible: yes
- Architect: Duarte Nuno Simões, Nuno Simões, João Santa Rita and José Santa Rita

Other information
- Station code: CR
- Fare zone: L

History
- Opened: July 18, 1998 (28 years ago)

Services
Preceding station	Lisbon Metro	Following station
Olivais towards São Sebastião	Red Line	Oriente towards Aeroporto
Route map
Location

Cabo Ruivo is a station on the Red Line of the Lisbon Metro. The station is located on Avenida Pádua, near the intersection with Avenida Infante Dom Henrique serving the Cabo Ruivo area of the city.

== History ==
The design is by architects João Santa-Rita, José-Santa Rita, Duarte Nuno Simoes and Nuno Simões, with installation art by the plastic artist David de Almeida.

== Connections ==
=== Urban buses ===
==== Carris ====
- 750 Estação Oriente (Interface) ⇄ Algés
- 782 Cais do Sodré ⇄ Praça José Queirós
- 794 Terreiro do Paço ⇄ Estação Oriente (Interface)

== See also ==
- List of Lisbon metro stations
