= Bela Vista Station =

Metro station in Lisbon, Portugal

Bela Vista
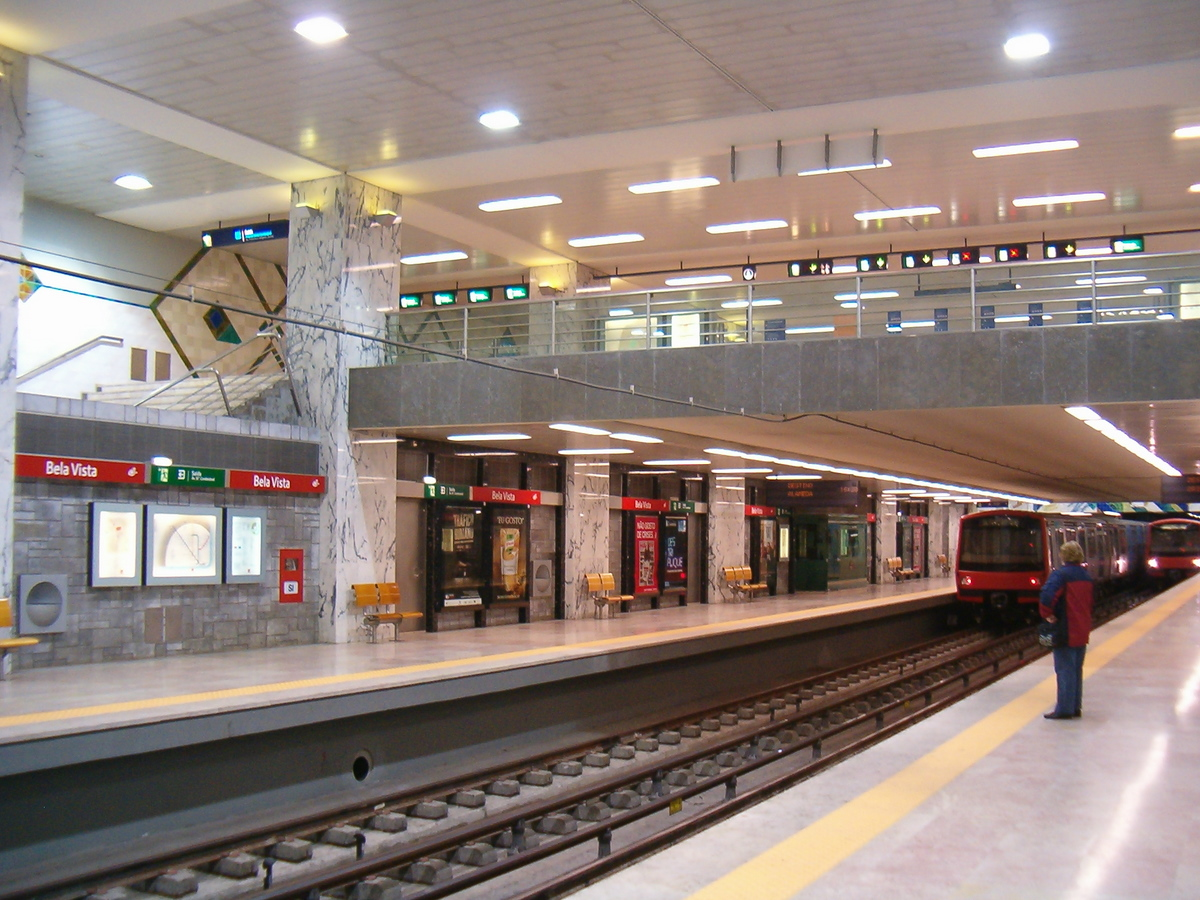

General information
- Location: Av. Francisco Salgado Zenha, Lisbon; Portugal
- Coordinates: 38°44′49″N 9°07′01″W
- Owner: Government-owned corporation
- Operator: Metropolitano de Lisboa, EPE
- Line: Red Line
- Platforms: 2 side platforms
- Tracks: 2

Construction
- Structure type: Underground
- Accessible: yes
- Architect: Paulo Brito da Silva

Other information
- Station code: BV
- Fare zone: L

History
- Opened: May 19, 1998 (28 years ago)

Services
Preceding station	Lisbon Metro	Following station
Olaias towards São Sebastião	Red Line	Chelas towards Aeroporto
Route map
Location

Bela Vista is a station on the Red Line of the Lisbon Metro. The station is located in at Avenida Francisco Salgado Zenha, close to Bela Vista Park and Pingo Doce da Bela Vista Shopping Mall.

== History ==
The architectural design is by Paulo Brito da Silva with installation art by plastic artist and ceramicist Querubim Lapa.

== Connections ==
=== Urban buses ===
==== Carris ====
- 793 Marvila ⇄ Estação Roma-Areeiro
- 794 Terreiro do Paço ⇄ Estação Oriente (Interface)

== See also ==
- List of Lisbon metro stations
