= Moscavide Station (Lisbon Metro) =

Metro station in Lisbon, Portugal

Moscavide
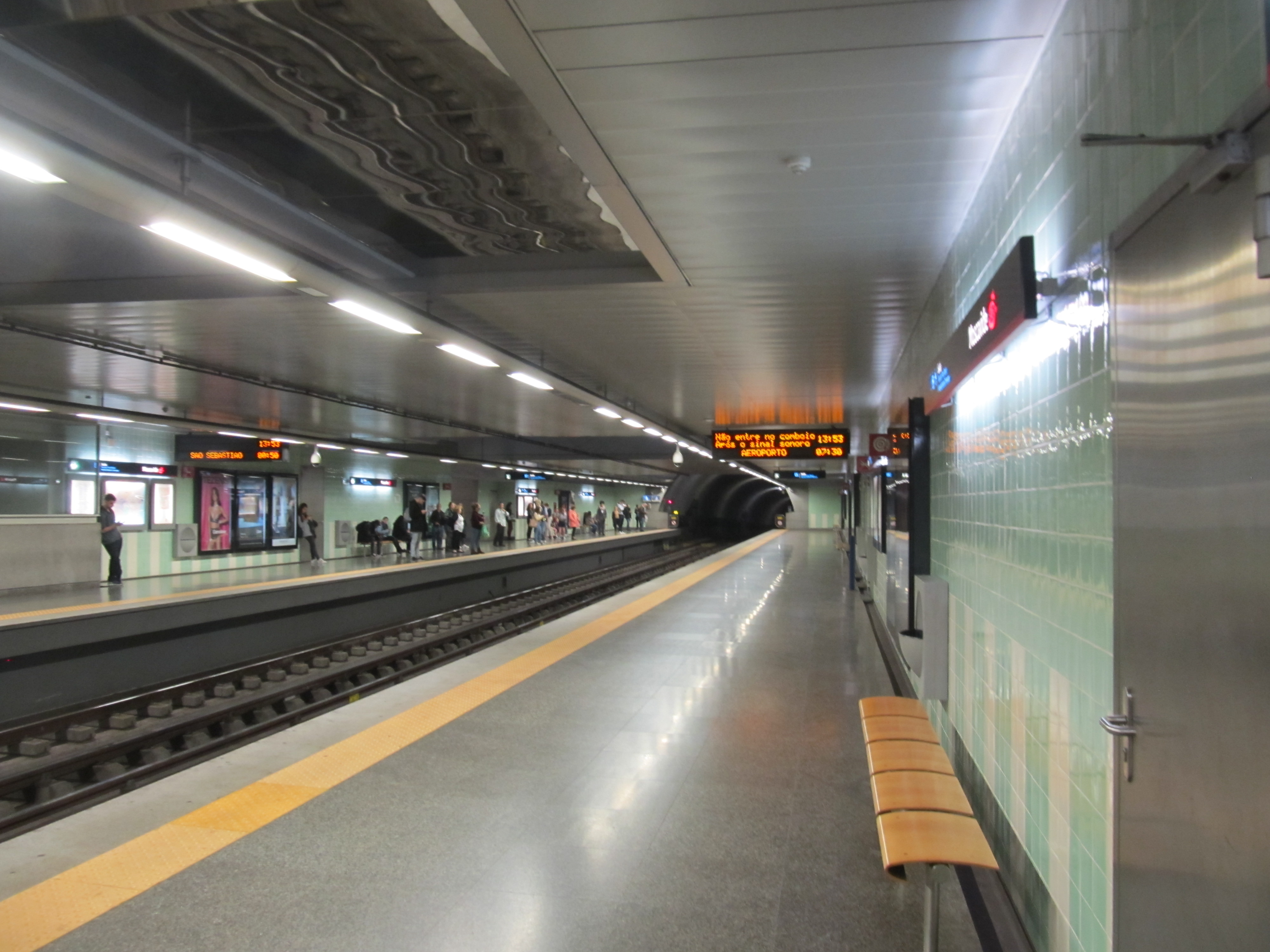

General information
- Location: Rua João Pinto Ribeiro, Loures; Portugal
- Coordinates: 38°46′30″N 9°06′09″W
- Owner: Government-owned corporation
- Operator: Metropolitano de Lisboa, EPE
- Line: Red Line
- Platforms: 2 side platforms
- Tracks: 2

Construction
- Structure type: Underground
- Accessible: yes
- Architect: Manuel Bastos

Other information
- Station code: MO
- Fare zone: L

History
- Opened: July 17, 2012 (14 years ago)

Services
| Preceding station | Lisbon Metro | Following station |
|---|---|---|
| Oriente towards São Sebastião | Red Line | Encarnação towards Aeroporto |
Route map
Location

Moscavide is a station on the Red Line of the Lisbon Metro. The station is in the parish of Moscavide in the Municipality of Loures, bordering Lisbon, and is located in Rua João Pinto Ribeiro beside Estádio Alfredo Marques Augusto.

The station, designed by the architect Manuel Bastos, opened in July 2012 in conjunction with the Encarnação and Aeroporto stations, as part of the expansion of the line to serve Lisbon Portela Airport.

== Connections ==
=== Urban buses ===
==== Carris ====
- 705 Estação Oriente (Interface) ⇄ Estação Roma-Areeiro
- 725 Estação Oriente (Interface) ⇄ Prior Velho - Rua Maestro Lopes Graça
- 728 Restelo - Av. das Descobertas ⇄ Portela - Av. dos Descobrimentos
- 731 Av. José Malhoa ⇄ Moscavide Centro
- 759 Restauradores ⇄ Estação Oriente (Interface)
- 782 Cais do Sodré ⇄ Praça José Queirós

=== Suburban buses ===
==== Rodoviária de Lisboa ====
- 301 Lisboa (Estação Oriente) ⇄ Loures (Zona Comercial) via Hospital
- 302 Lisboa (Praça José Queirós) ⇄ Bairro de Santiago
- 303 Rodinhas de Moscavide (circular)
- 309 Lisboa (Estação Oriente) ⇄ Cabeço de Aguieira
- 310 Lisboa (Estação Oriente) ⇄ Charneca do Lumiar
- 316 Lisboa (Estação Oriente) ⇄ Santa Iria de Azoia
- 317 Lisboa (Estação Oriente) ⇄ Bairro da Covina
- 318 Lisboa (Estação Oriente) ⇄ Portela da Azóia
- 750 Lisboa (Estação Oriente) circulação via Bairro das Coroas e Unhos

== See also ==
- List of Lisbon metro stations
