= Oriente Station (Lisbon Metro) =

Metro station in Lisbon, Portugal

Oriente
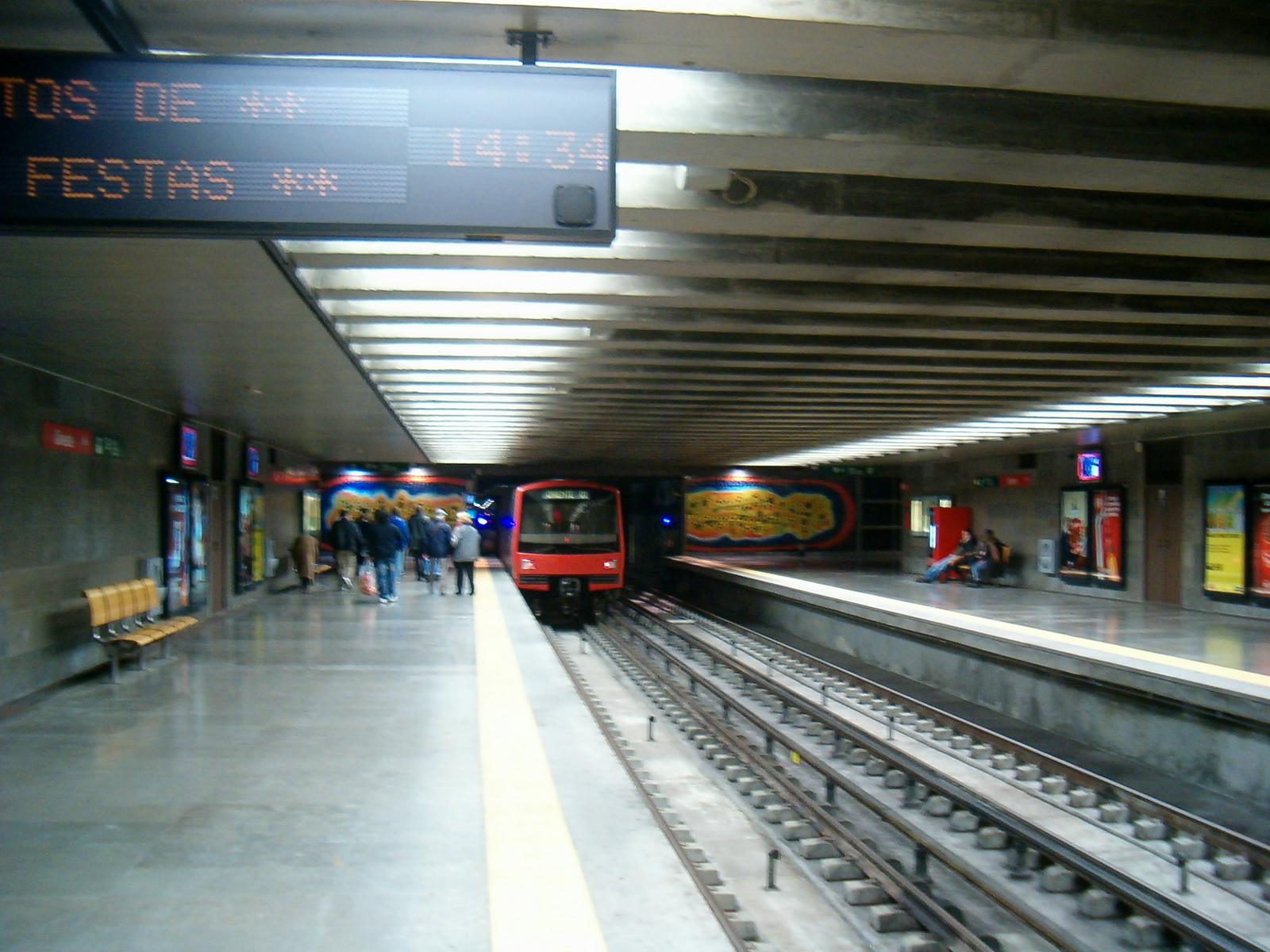

General information
- Location: Avenida de Berlim, Lisbon; Portugal
- Coordinates: 38°46′04″N 9°05′57″W
- Owner: Government-owned corporation
- Operator: Metropolitano de Lisboa, EPE
- Line: Red Line
- Platforms: 2 side platforms
- Tracks: 2
- Connections: Mainline rail interchange Bus interchange

Construction
- Structure type: Underground
- Accessible: yes
- Architect: Sanchez Jorge

Other information
- Station code: OR
- Fare zone: L

History
- Opened: 19 May 1998 (28 years ago)

Services
| Preceding station | Lisbon Metro | Following station |
|---|---|---|
| Cabo Ruivo towards São Sebastião | Red Line | Moscavide towards Aeroporto |
Route map
Location

Oriente is a station on the Red Line of the Lisbon Metro. The station is located in Lisbon, between the Cabo Ruivo and Moscavide stations. The station is a part of the Gare do Oriente, one of the main transport hubs of the city, serving the North, Sintra, and Azambuja Lines and also several bus lines.

== History ==
The station opened on 19 May 1998 in conjunction with the Alameda, Olaias, Bela Vista and Chelas stations, with the original construction of the Red Line, connection central Lisbon to the new zone occupied by the EXPO'98.

=== Art and architecture ===
The station architect was Sanchez Jorge. Eleven artworks from international artists from five continents are installed throughout the station, with each artwork reflecting the ocean theme of EXPO'98. Artworks are by Argentine artist Antonio Seguí, Australian painter Arthur Boyd, Icelandic artist Erró, Austrian artist Hundertwasser, Japanese artist Yayoi Kusama, Portuguese artist Joaquim Rodrigo, Malian artist Abdoulaye Konaté, Irish artist Sean Scully, Indian painter Raza, Chinese-French painter Zao Wou-Ki and Polish sculptor Magdalena Abakanowicz.

== Connections ==
=== Urban buses ===
==== Carris ====
- 208 Cais do Sodré ⇄ Estação Oriente (Interface) (morning service)
- 210 Cais do Sodré ⇄ Prior Velho (morning service)
- 400 Parque das Nações Norte ⇄ Parque das Nações Sul
- 705 Estação Oriente (Interface) ⇄ Estação Roma-Areeiro
- 708 Martim Moniz ⇄ Parque das Nações Norte
- 725 Estação Oriente (Interface) ⇄ Prior Velho - Rua Maestro Lopes Graç
- 728 Restelo - Av. das Descobertas ⇄ Portela - Av. dos Descobrimentos
- 744 Marquês de Pombal ⇄ Moscavide (Quinta das Laranjeiras)
- 750 Estação Oriente (Interface) ⇄ Algés
- 759 Restauradores ⇄ Estação Oriente (Interface)
- 782 Cais do Sodré ⇄ Praça José Queirós
- 794 Terreiro do Paço ⇄ Estação Oriente (Interface)

=== Suburban buses ===
==== Rodoviária de Lisboa ====
- 301 Lisboa (Estação Oriente) ⇄ Loures (Zona Comercial) via Hospital
- 305 Lisboa (Estação Oriente) ⇄ Loures
- 308 Urbana de Estação Oriente circulação via Sacavém
- 309 Lisboa (Estação Oriente) ⇄ Cabeço de Aguieira
- 310 Lisboa (Estação Oriente) ⇄ Charneca do Lumiar
- 316 Lisboa (Estação Oriente)) ⇄ Santa Iria da Azóia
- 317 Lisboa (Estação Oriente) ⇄ Bairro da Covina
- 318 Lisboa (Estação Oriente) ⇄ Portela da Azóia
- 330 Lisboa (Estação Oriente) ⇄ Forte da Casa
- 347 Lisboa (Estação Oriente) ⇄ Alverca (Arcena)
- 750 Lisboa (Estação Oriente) circulação via Bairro das Coroas e Unhos

==== Transportes Sul do Tejo ====
- 333 Lisboa (Gare do Oriente) ⇄ Vale da Amoreira
- 431 Lisboa ⇄ Montijo
- 432 Atalaia ⇄ Lisboa (via Alcochete)
- 435 Lisboa ⇄ Samouco (via Montijo)
- 437 Lisboa ⇄ Montijo (via São Francisco)
- 453 Lisboa (Gare do Oriente) ⇄ São Francisco (via Montijo)
- 562 Lisboa ⇄ Setúbal (via Ponte Vasco da Gama) (Rápida)
- 565 Lisboa ⇄ Setúbal (via Ponte Vasco da Gama e Pinhal Novo) (Rápida)

=== Rail ===
==== Comboios de Portugal ====
- Sintra ⇄ Lisboa - Oriente
- Sintra ⇄ Alverca
- Alcântara-Terra ⇄ Castanheira do Ribatejo
- Lisboa - Santa Apolónia ⇄ Azambuja
- Lisboa - Santa Apolónia ⇄ Covilhã (Regional)
- Lisboa - Santa Apolónia ⇄ Leiria (Regional)
- Lisboa - Santa Apolónia ⇄ Tomar (Regional)
- Lisboa - Santa Apolónia ⇄ Entroncamento (Regional)
- Lisboa - Santa Apolónia ⇄ Porto - Campanhã (Regional)
- Lisboa - Santa Apolónia ⇄ Castelo Branco (Regional)
- Lisboa - Santa Apolónia ⇄ Pampilhosa (Regional)
- Lisboa - Santa Apolónia ⇄ Tomar (InterRegional)
- Lisboa - Santa Apolónia ⇄ Entroncamento (InterRegional)
- Lisboa - Santa Apolónia ⇄ Porto - Campanhã (InterRegional)
- Lisboa - Oriente ⇄ Évora (Intercities)
- Lisboa - Oriente ⇄ Faro (Intercities)
- Lisboa - Santa Apolónia ⇄ Porto - Campanhã (Intercities)
- Lisboa - Santa Apolónia ⇄ Braga (Intercities)
- Lisboa - Santa Apolónia ⇄ Guimarães (Intercities)
- Lisboa - Santa Apolónia ⇄ Guarda (Intercities)
- Lisboa - Santa Apolónia ⇄ Covilhã (Intercities)
- Lisboa - Santa Apolónia ⇄ Porto - Campanhã (Alfa Pendular)
- Lisboa - Santa Apolónia ⇄ Braga (Alfa Pendular)
- Lisboa - Santa Apolónia ⇄ Guimarães (Alfa Pendular)
- Porto - Campanhã ⇄ Faro (Alfa Pendular)
- Lisboa - Santa Apolónia ⇄ Hendaye (International)
- Lisboa - Santa Apolónia ⇄ Madrid (International)

== See also ==
- List of Lisbon metro stations
