= Lisbon Metro Green Line =

Metro line in Lisbon, Portugal

Green Line
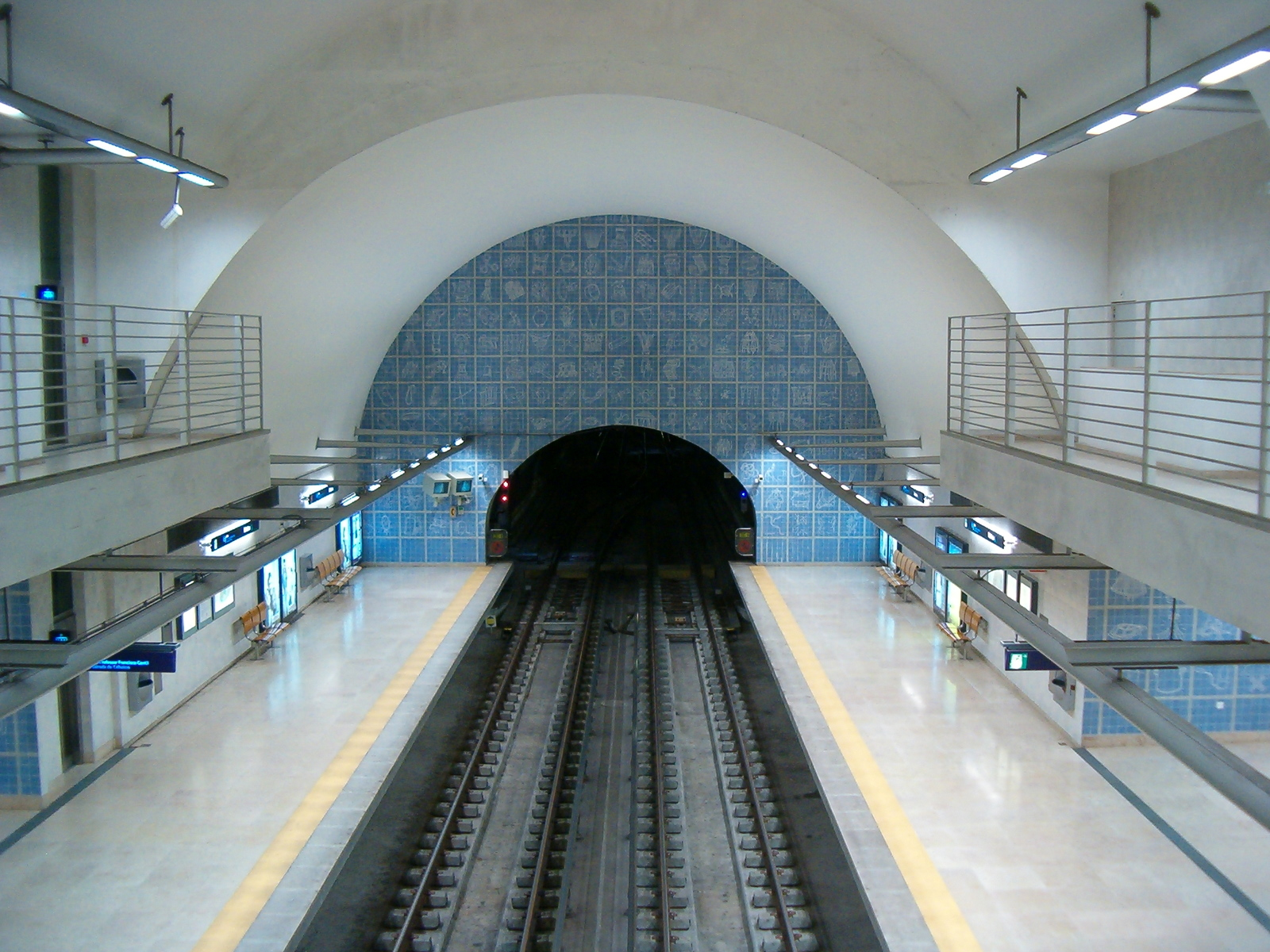
- Lisbon metro station Telheiras

Overview
- Other name: Caravel Line
- Native name: Linha Verde
- Owner: Government-owned corporation
- Locale: Lisbon, Portugal
- Termini: Telheiras; Cais do Sodré
- Connecting lines: Yellow Line Red Line Blue Line
- Stations: 13

Service
- Type: Rapid Transit
- System: Metropolitano de Lisboa
- Operator(s): Metropolitano de Lisboa, EPE
- Rolling stock: ML97, ML99

History
- Opened: January 27, 1963 (63 years ago)
- Last extension: 2002

Technical
- Line length: 9 km (5.6 mi)
- Character: Underground subway
- Track gauge: 1,435 mm (4 ft 8 1/2 in) standard gauge
- Electrification: 750 V DC third rail
Route map
Topographic map

The Green Line (Portuguese: Linha Verde) or Caravel Line (Portuguese: Linha da Caravela) is one of the four lines of Lisbon Metro.

== Stations ==
Telheiras
Campo Grande
Alvalade
Roma

Areeiro
Alameda
Arroios
Anjos
Intendente
Martim Moniz
Rossio
Baixa-Chiado
Cais do Sodré

== Frequency ==
	Summer timetable		Winter timetable	
	Time	Headway	Time	Headway
Working days	06:30 - 07:30 07:30 - 08:00 08:00 - 08:30 08:30 - 09:30 09:30 - 10:00 10:00 - 10:30 10:30 - 16:00 16:00 - 17:00 17:00 - 19:00 19:00 - 20:00 20:00 - 20:30 20:30 - 21:30 21:30 - 01:05	06' 10" 05' 00" 04' 35" 03' 50" 05' 00" 06' 10" 07' 00" 05' 00" 04' 10" 04' 55" 06' 05" 08' 05" 12' 00"	06:30 - 07:15 07:15 - 10:00 10:00 - 16:15 16:15 - 19:00 19:00 - 20:30 20:30 - 21:00 21:00 - 22:15 22:15 - 01:05	06' 00" 03' 35" 06' 05" 03' 50" 04' 55" 06' 00" 07' 55" 11' 50"
Weekends and holidays	06:30 - 21:30 21:30 - 22:30 22:30 - 01:05	08' 05" 09' 30" 11' 50"'	06:30 - 21:30 21:30 - 22:30 22:30 - 01:05	08' 05" 09' 30" 11' 50"

== Chronology ==
- December 29, 1959: Opening of the original Lisbon Metro network with a Y shape. Common branch stations: Restauradores, Avenida, Rotunda (former name of the Marquês de Pombal station and where the line would split into the two branches). Current Blue Line branch stations (coming from Rotunda station): Parque, São Sebastião, Palhavã (former name of the Praça de Espanha station) and Sete Rios (former name of the Jardim Zoológico station). Current Yellow Line branch stations (coming from Rotunda station): Picoas, Saldanha, Campo Pequeno and Entre Campos.
- January 27, 1963: Opening of the Rossio station. Main branch route: Restauradores - Rossio.
- September 28, 1966: Opening of the Socorro (former name of the Martim Moniz station), Intendente and Anjos stations. Main branch route: Restauradores - Anjos.
- June 18, 1972: Opening of the Arroios, Alameda, Areeiro, Roma and Alvalade stations. Main branch route: Restauradores - Alvalade.
- October 15, 1988: Opening of the Cidade Universitária, Laranjeiras, Alto dos Moinhos and Colégio Militar/Luz stations. Current Blue Line branch route: Rotunda - Colégio Militar/Luz. Current Yellow Line branch route: Rotunda - Cidade Universitária.
- April 3, 1993: Opening of the Campo Grande station. Main branch route: Restauradores - Campo Grande. Current Yellow Line branch route: Rotunda - Campo Grande.
- July 15, 1995: Creation of the Blue and Yellow lines by building a second Rotunda station. New Blue line route: Colégio Militar/Luz - Campo Grande.
- October 18, 1997: Opening of the Carnide and Pontinha stations. Line route: Pontinha - Campo Grande.
- March 1, 1998: Palhavã station is renamed to Marquês de Pombal, Sete Rios station is renamed to Jardim Zoológico and Socorro station is renamed to Martim Moniz.
- March 3, 1998: Creation of the Blue and Green line by closing the Restauradores - Rossio tunnel. New Green line route: Rossio - Campo Grande.
- April 18, 1998: Opening of the Baixa-Chiado and Cais do Sodré stations. Line route: Cais do Sodré - Campo Grande.
- November 2, 2002: Opening of the Telheiras station. Line route: Cais do Sodré - Telheiras.

== Future ==
- Construction has started to add two new stations (Santos and Estrela), connecting the Green Line at Cais do Sodré to the Yellow Line at Rato and creating a circle line with the merger of the Green Line between Cais do Sódre and Campo Grande and the Yellow Line between Rato and Campo Grande.

== See also ==
- List of Lisbon metro stations
