= Areeiro Station =

Metro station in Lisbon, Portugal

Areeiro
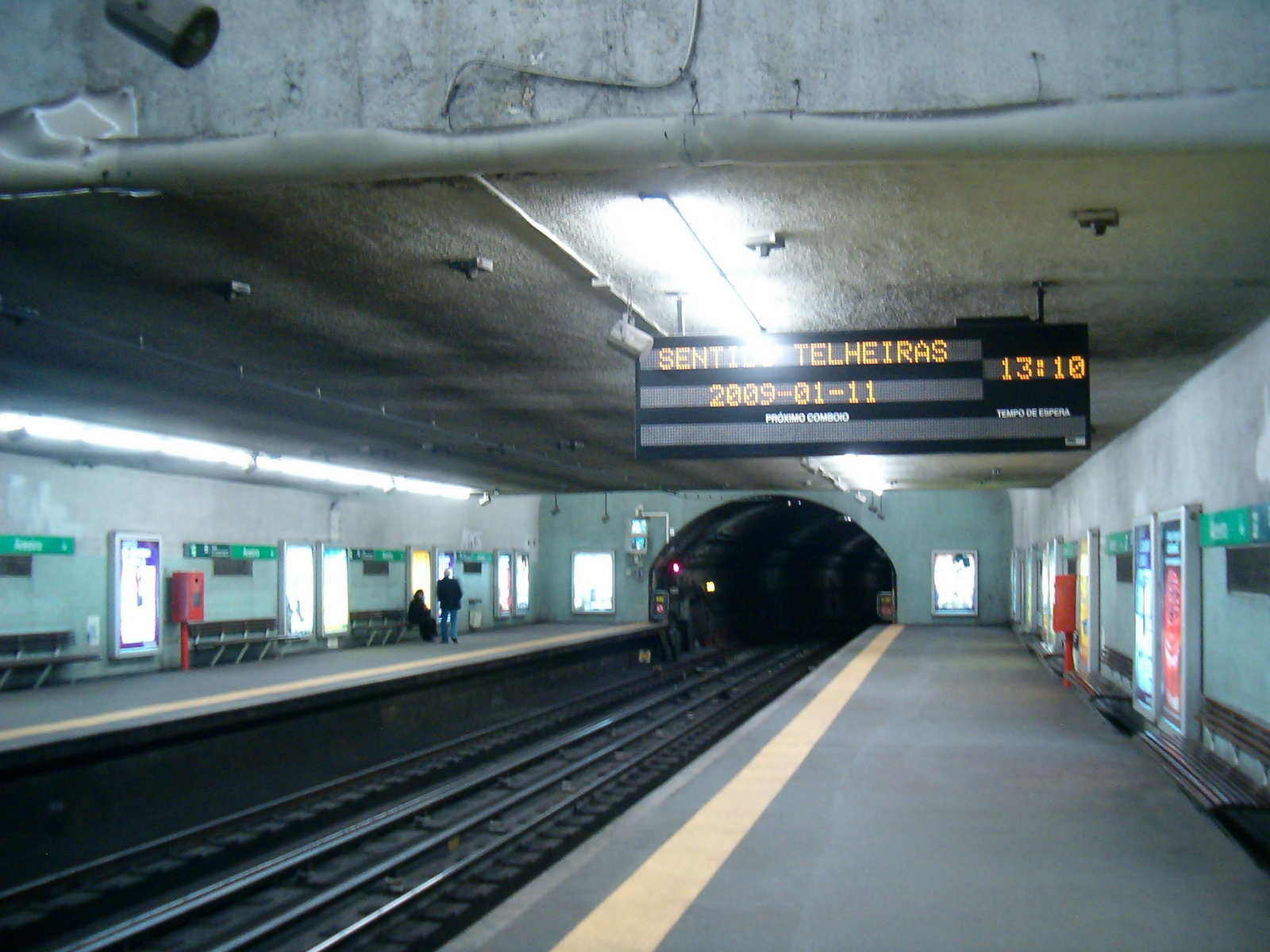

General information
- Location: Praça Francisco Sá Carneiro, Lisbon; Portugal
- Coordinates: 38°44′34″N 9°08′01″W
- Owner: Government-owned corporation
- Operator: Metropolitano de Lisboa, EPE
- Line: Green Line
- Platforms: 2 side platforms
- Tracks: 2
- Connections: Roma-Areeiro

Construction
- Structure type: Underground
- Accessible: Yes
- Architect: Dinis Gomes

Other information
- Station code: AE
- Fare zone: L

History
- Opened: 18 June 1972 (54 years ago)

Services
Preceding station	Lisbon Metro	Following station
Roma towards Telheiras	Green Line	Alameda towards Cais do Sodré
Route map
Location

Areeiro is a station on the Green Line of the Lisbon Metro serving the Areeiro neighbourhood. The station is located in the Praça Francisco Sá Carneiro, just south of the Roma-Areeiro railway station.

== History ==
The station was designed by the architect Denis Gomes with art installations by the painter Maria Keil.

== Connections ==
=== Urban buses ===
==== Carris ====
- 206 Cais do Sodré ⇄ Senhor Roubado (Metro) (morning service)
- 208 Cais do Sodré ⇄ Estação Oriente (Interface) (morning service)
- 705 Estação Oriente (Interface) ⇄ Estação Roma-Areeiro
- 708 Martim Moniz ⇄ Parque das Nações Norte
- 717 Praça do Chile ⇄ Fetais
- 720 Picheleira / Rua Faria Vasconcelos ⇄ Calvário
- 722 Praça de Londres ⇄ Portela - Rua dos Escritores
- 727 Estação Roma-Areeiro ⇄ Restelo - Av. das Descobertas
- 735 Cais do Sodré ⇄ Hospital Santa Maria
- 756 Olaias ⇄ Rua da Junqueira
- 793 Marvila ⇄ Estação Roma-Areeiro

==== Aerobus ====
- Linha 1 Aeroporto ⇄ Cais do Sodré

=== Suburban buses ===
==== Rodoviária de Lisboa ====
- 319 Lisboa (Areeiro) ⇄ Alverca (Zona Industrial)
- 320 Lisboa (Areeiro) ⇄ Alverca (Estação) via Forte da Casa
- 321 Lisboa (Areeiro) ⇄ Via Rara

==== Transportes Sul do Tejo ====
- 160 Almada ⇄ Lisboa (Praça do Areeiro) (via Alcântara)
- 161 Costa de Caparica ⇄ Lisboa (Praça do Areeiro) (via Alcântara)
- 190 Charneca de Caparica ⇄ Lisboa (Praça do Areeiro)

=== Rail ===
==== Comboios de Portugal ====
- Sintra ⇄ Lisboa - Oriente
- Sintra ⇄ Alverca
- Alcântara-Terra ⇄ Castanheira do Ribatejo

==== Fertagus ====
- Setúbal ⇄ Roma-Areeiro
- Coina ⇄ Roma-Areeiro

== See also ==
- List of Lisbon metro stations
