= Anjos Station =

Metro station in Lisbon, Portugal

Coordinates: 38.7264°N 9.1350°W

Anjos
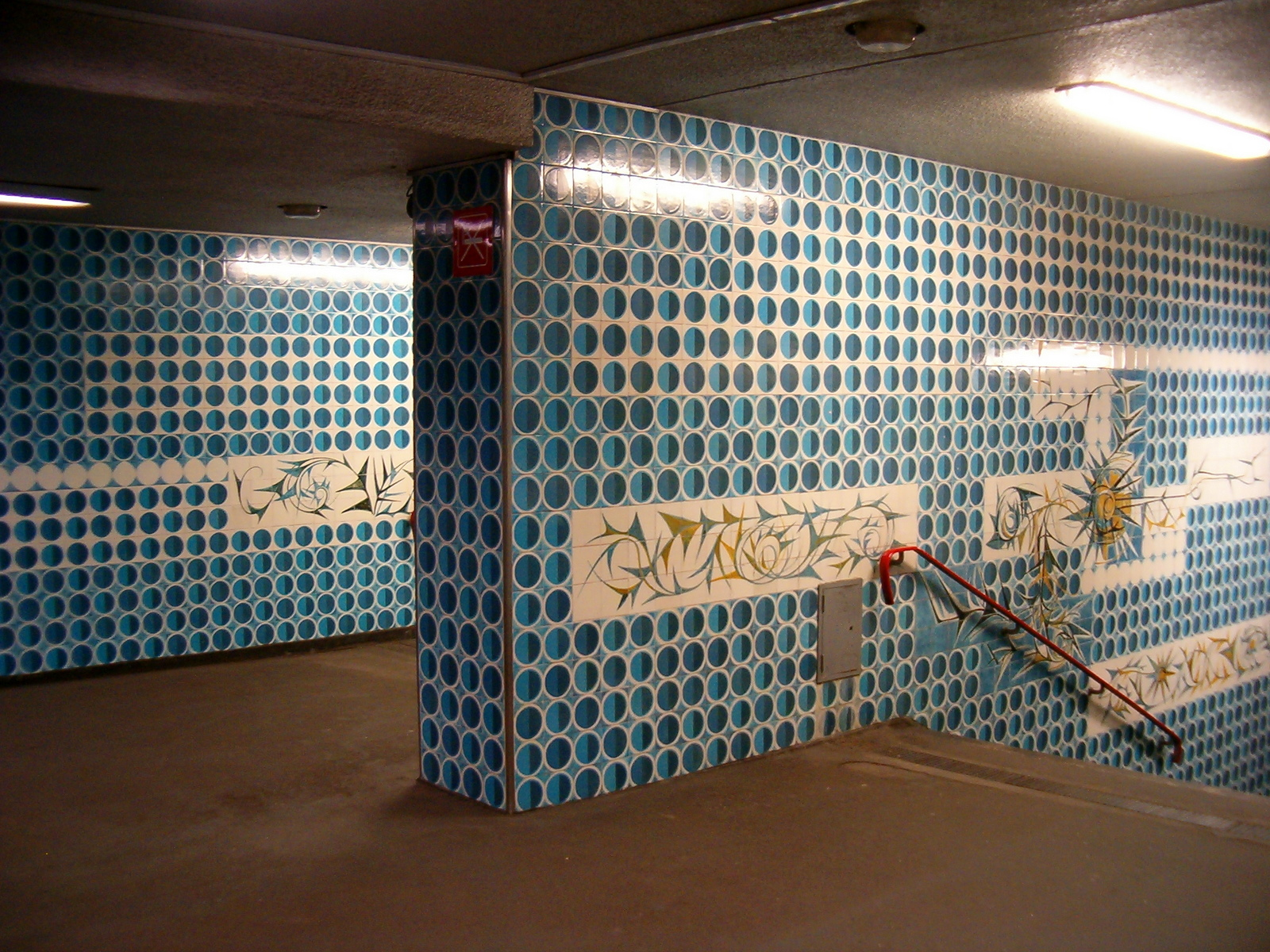

General information
- Location: Av. Almirante Reis, Lisbon; Portugal
- Owner: Government-owned corporation
- Operator: Metropolitano de Lisboa, EPE
- Line: Green Line
- Platforms: 2 side platforms
- Tracks: 2

Construction
- Structure type: Underground
- Accessible: No
- Architect: Dinis Gomes

Other information
- Station code: AN
- Fare zone: L

History
- Opened: September 28, 1966 (59 years ago)

Services
Preceding station	Lisbon Metro	Following station
Arroios towards Telheiras	Green Line	Intendente towards Cais do Sodré
Route map
Location

Anjos is a station on the Green Line of the Lisbon Metro. The station is located on the Almirante Reis Avenue, close to Monte Agudo. It takes its name from the historic Anjos parish.

== History ==
The station was designed by the architect Denis Gomes with art installations by the painter Maria Keil.

== Connections ==
=== Urban buses ===
==== Carris ====
- 208 Cais do Sodré ⇄ Estação Oriente (Interface) (morning service)
- 708 Martim Moniz ⇄ Parque das Nações Norte
- 712 Estação Santa Apolónia ⇄ Alcântara Mar (Museu do Oriente)
- 726 Sapadores ⇄ Pontinha Centro
- 730 Picheleira (Quinta do Lavrado) ⇄ Picoas

==== Aerobus ====
- Linha 1 Aeroporto ⇄ Cais do Sodré

== See also ==
- List of Lisbon metro stations
