= Alameda Station =

Metro station in Lisbon, Portugal

Alameda
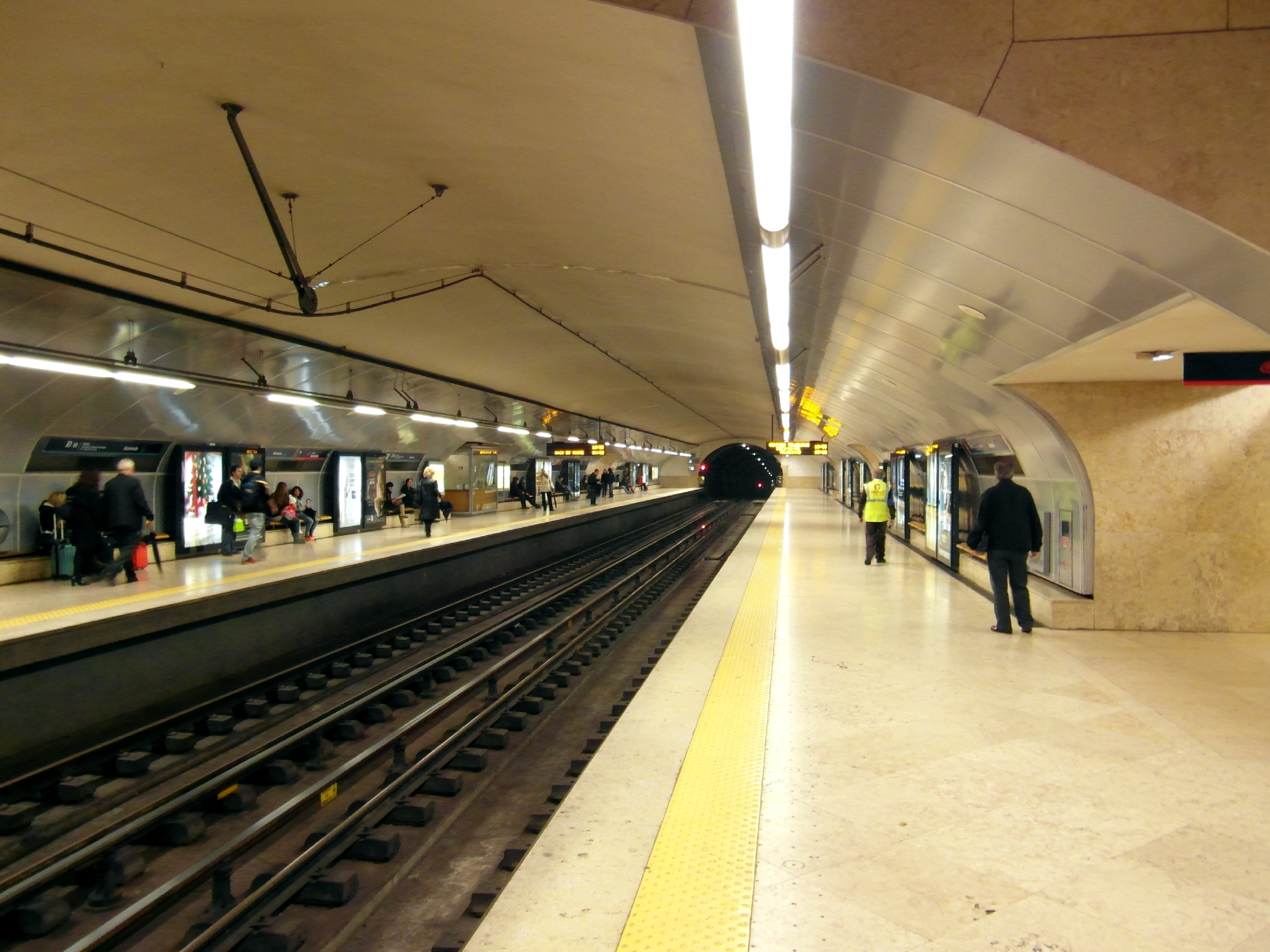

General information
- Location: Av. Almirante Reis, Lisbon; Portugal
- Coordinates: 38°44′12″N 9°08′02″W
- Owner: Government-owned corporation
- Operator: Metropolitano de Lisboa, EPE
- Line: Green Line Red Line
- Platforms: 4 side platforms
- Tracks: 4

Construction
- Structure type: Underground
- Accessible: yes
- Architect: Green Line: Dinis Gomes; Red Line: Manuel Taínha

Other information
- Station code: AM
- Fare zone: L

History
- Opened: Green Line: June 18, 1972 (54 years ago); Red Line: May 19, 1998 (28 years ago)

Services
Preceding station	Lisbon Metro	Following station
Areeiro towards Telheiras	Green Line	Arroios towards Cais do Sodré
Saldanha towards São Sebastião	Red Line	Olaias towards Aeroporto
Route map
Location

Alameda is a station on the Green and Red Lines of the Lisbon Metro. The station is located on Avenida Almirante Reis at Alameda Dom Afonso Henriques, east of the Instituto Superior Técnico.

== History ==
This section of the Green Line opened in June 1972 together with Arroios, Areeiro, Roma and Alvalade stations. The original architectural design of the station was by Dinis Gomes with installation art by the plastic artist Maria Keil. Full refurbishment of the station was completed in March 1998, which involved extending the piers of the existing station for the construction of the Red Line. The architect for this project was Manuel Tainha and the artist was Luís Noronha da Costa.

The Red Line station opened in May 1998 in conjunction with Olaias, Bela Vista, Chelas and Oriente stations, with a view to extending the network to the area of Expo '98. The architectural design for this is also by Manuel Tainha and the art work by plastic artists Costa Pinheiro and Juhana Blomstedt, and sculptor Alberto Carneiro.

Fire and a large explosion on the morning of October 19, 1997, during the refurbishment of the station, killed two workers.

== Connections ==
=== Urban buses ===
==== Carris ====
- 206 Cais do Sodré ⇄ Senhor Roubado (Metro) (morning service)
- 706 Cais do Sodré ⇄ Estação Santa Apolónia
- 708 Martim Moniz ⇄ Parque das Nações Norte
- 713 Alameda D. A. Henriques ⇄ Estação Campolide
- 716 Alameda D. A. Henriques ⇄ Benfica - Al. Padre Álvaro Proença
- 717 Praça do Chile ⇄ Fetais
- 718 ISEL ⇄ Al. Afonso Henriques
- 720 Picheleira / Rua Faria Vasconcelos ⇄ Calvário
- 735 Cais do Sodré ⇄ Hospital Santa Maria

==== Aerobus ====
- Linha 1 Aeroporto ⇄ Cais do Sodré

== See also ==
- List of Lisbon metro stations
