= Roma Station (Lisbon Metro) =

Metro station in Lisbon, Portugal

Roma
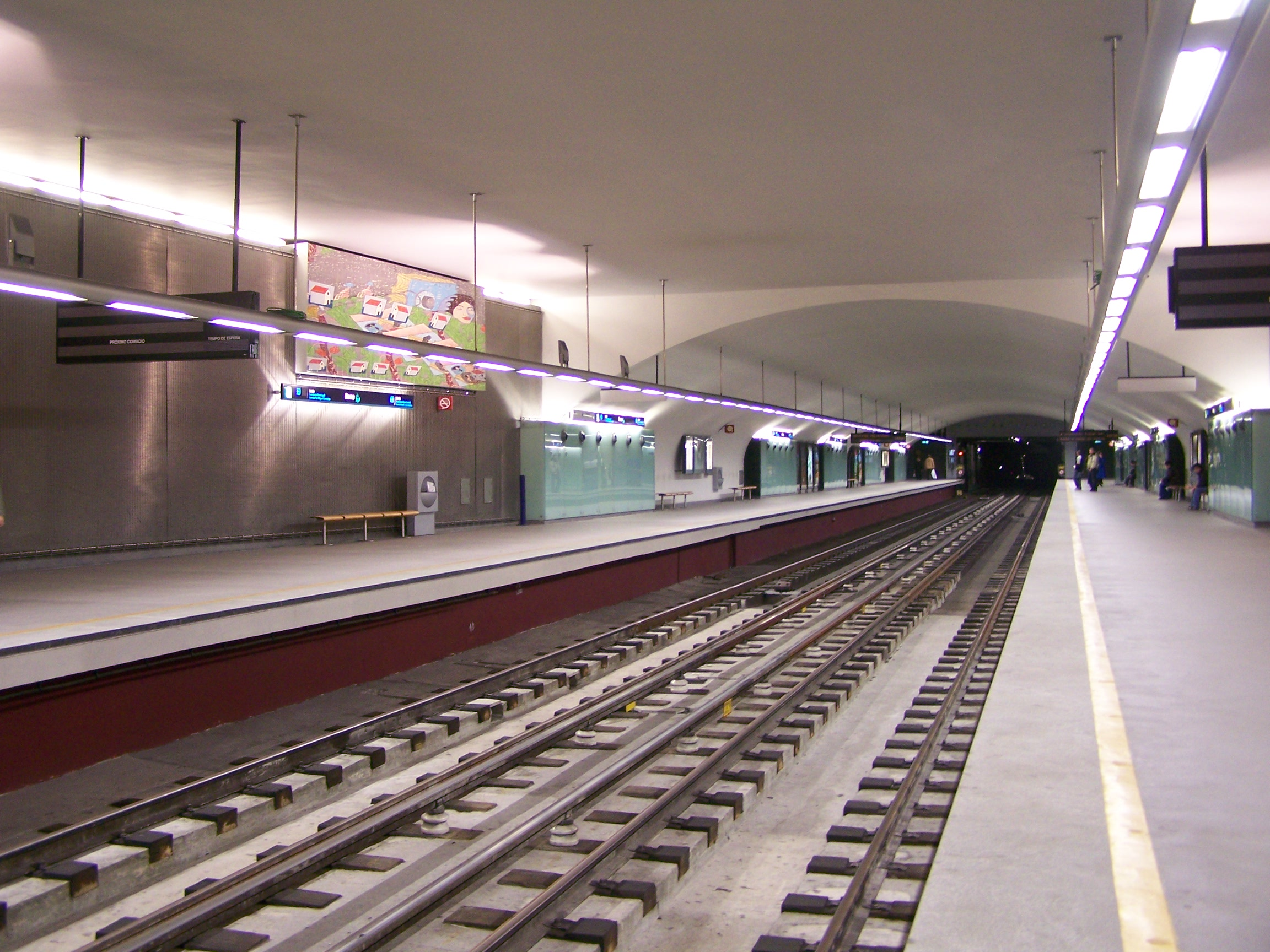

General information
- Location: Avenida de Roma, Lisbon; Portugal
- Coordinates: 38°44′56″N 9°08′30″W
- Owner: Government-owned corporation
- Operator: Metropolitano de Lisboa, EPE
- Line: Green Line
- Platforms: 2 side platforms
- Tracks: 2
- Connections: Roma-Areeiro

Construction
- Structure type: Underground
- Accessible: Yes
- Architect: Falcão e Cunha

Other information
- Station code: RM
- Fare zone: L

History
- Opened: June 18, 1972 (54 years ago)

Services
Preceding station	Lisbon Metro	Following station
Alvalade towards Telheiras	Green Line	Areeiro towards Cais do Sodré
Route map
Location

Roma is a station on the Green Line of the Lisbon Metro. The station is located on Avenida de Roma, near the intersection with Avenida dos Estados Unidos da América, enabling access to the Roma-Areeiro railway station nearby.

== History ==
The original structure was designed by the architect Denis Gomes with art installations by the painter Maria Keil. The stations was expanded and refurbished in 2010 by the architect Ana Nascimento, with art installations by painters Lurdes de Castro, René Bertholo and Maria Keil.

== Connections ==
=== Urban buses ===
==== Carris ====
- 206 Cais do Sodré ⇄ Senhor Roubado (Metro) (rede da madrugada)
- 727 Estação Roma-Areeiro ⇄ Restelo - Av. das Descobertas
- 735 Cais do Sodré ⇄ Hospital Santa Maria
- 767 Campo Mártires da Pátria ⇄ Reboleira (Metro)

=== Rail ===
==== Comboios de Portugal ====
- Sintra ⇄ Lisboa - Oriente
- Sintra ⇄ Alverca
- Alcântara-Terra ⇄ Castanheira do Ribatejo

==== Fertagus ====
- Setúbal ⇄ Roma-Areeiro
- Coina ⇄ Roma-Areeiro

== See also ==
- List of Lisbon metro stations
