= Arroios Station =

Metro station in Lisbon, Portugal

Coordinates: 38.7335°N 9.1345°W

Arroios
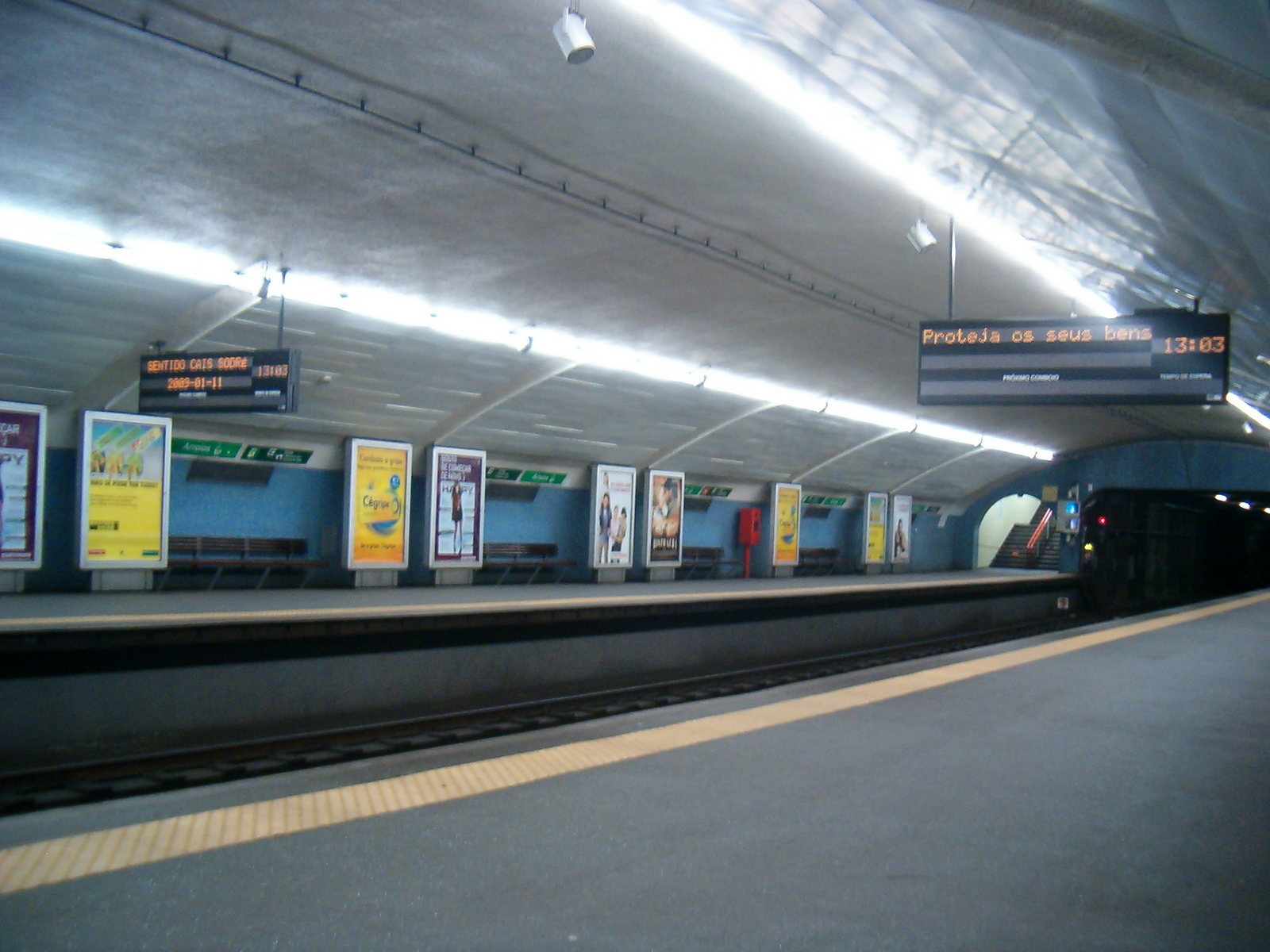

General information
- Location: Av. Almirante Reis, Lisbon; Portugal
- Owner: Government-owned corporation
- Operator: Metropolitano de Lisboa, EPE
- Line: Green Line
- Platforms: 2 side platforms
- Tracks: 2

Construction
- Structure type: Underground
- Accessible: Yes
- Architect: Dinis Gomes

Other information
- Station code: AR
- Fare zone: L

History
- Opened: 18 June 1972 (54 years ago)
- Rebuilt: 2017–2021

Services
Preceding station	Lisbon Metro	Following station
Alameda towards Telheiras	Green Line	Anjos towards Cais do Sodré
Route map
Location

Arroios is a station on the Green Line of the Lisbon Metro. The station is located on Avenida Almirante Reis, in Arroios neighbourhood.

== History ==
The station, which opened on 18 June 1972, was designed by the architect Denis Gomes with art installations by the painter Maria Keil.

On 19 July 2017, the station was closed for extensive renovations; the station's platforms only had room for 4 cars, requiring use of selective door operation. The platforms were expanded from 75 to 105 metres, enabling all stations on the Green Line to be able to support six-car trains. The station reopened on 14 September 2021.

== Connections ==
=== Urban buses ===
==== Carris ====
- 206 Cais do Sodré ⇄ Senhor Roubado (Metro) (morning service)
- 208 Cais do Sodré ⇄ Estação Oriente (Interface) (morning service)
- 706 Cais do Sodré ⇄ Estação Santa Apolónia
- 708 Martim Moniz ⇄ Parque das Nações Norte
- 717 Praça do Chile ⇄ Fetais
- 718 ISEL ⇄ Al. Afonso Henriques
- 735 Cais do Sodré ⇄ Hospital Santa Maria
- 742 Bairro Madre Deus (Escola) ⇄ Casalinho da Ajuda
- 797 Sapadores - Circulação

==== Aerobus ====
- Linha 1 Aeroporto ⇄ Cais do Sodré

== See also ==
- List of Lisbon metro stations
