= Alvalade Station =

Metro station in Lisbon, Portugal

Alvalade
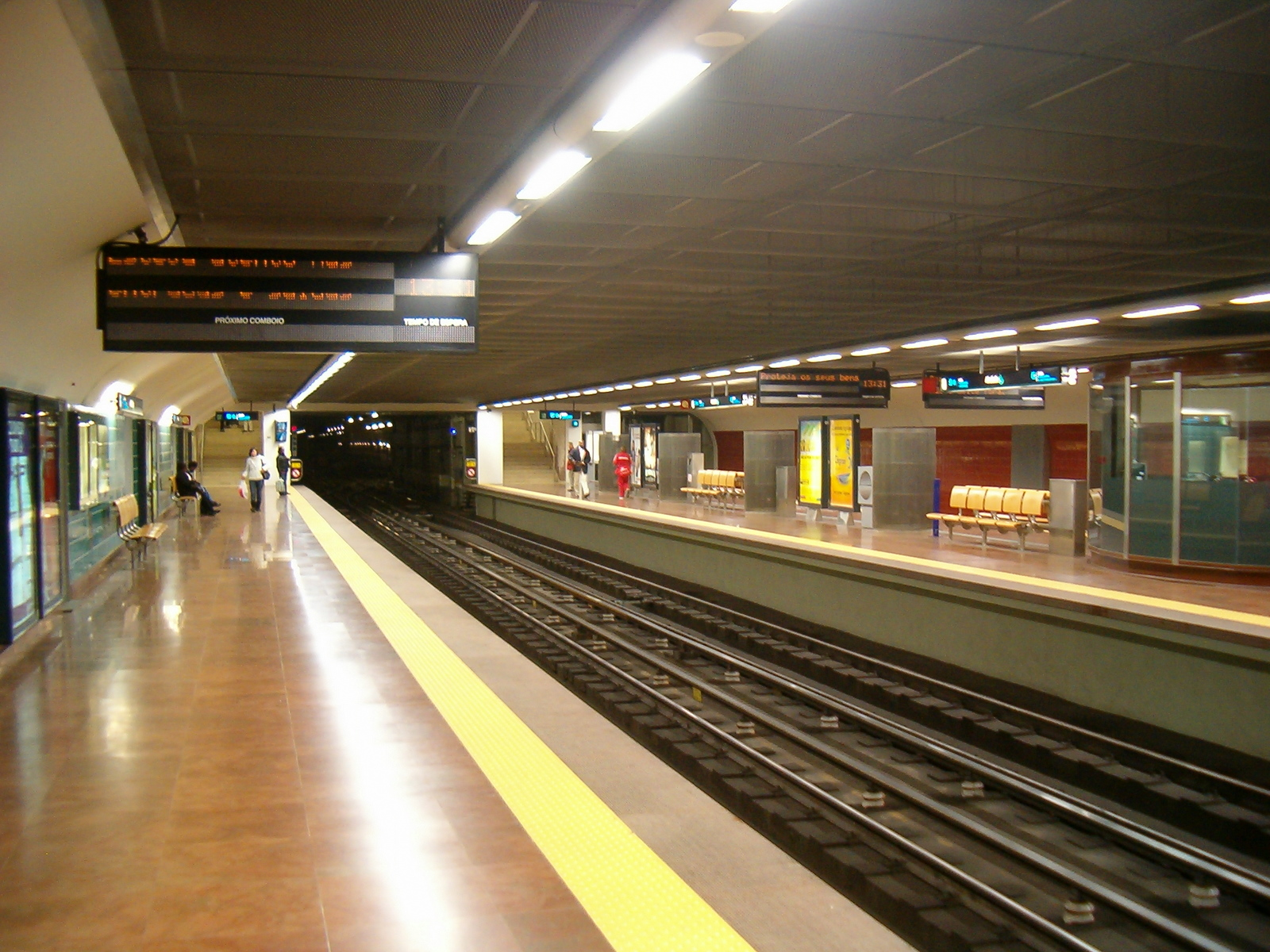

General information
- Location: Av. de Roma, Lisbon; Portugal
- Coordinates: 38°45′12″N 9°08′39″W
- Platforms: one side platform and one island platform
- Tracks: 3

Construction
- Structure type: Underground
- Accessible: yes
- Architect: Dinis Gomes

Other information
- Station code: AL

History
- Opened: 18 June 1972 (54 years ago)

Services
Preceding station	Lisbon Metro	Following station
Campo Grande towards Telheiras	Green Line	Roma towards Cais do Sodré
Route map
Location

Alvalade is a station on the Green Line of the Lisbon Metro. The station is located under Avenida de Roma, at the intersection with Avenida da Igreja in the Alvalade neighbourhood.

== History ==
The original 1972 design of the station was by the architect Denis Gomes with art work by Maria Keil. On 17 August 2006 the south lobby was opened based on a renovation project designed by the architect Sanchez Jorge with art installations by Bela Silva; the remodeled north lobby would be completed on 25 October 2007, this time with assistance from the original artist Maria Keil. The station was also equipped to be able to serve passengers with physical disabilities; lifts provide access to the platforms.

== Connections ==
=== Urban buses ===
==== Carris ====
- 206 Cais do Sodré ⇄ Senhor Roubado (Metro) (morning service)
- 735 Cais do Sodré ⇄ Hospital Santa Maria
- 755 Poço do Bispo ⇄ Sete Rios
- 767 Campo Mártires da Pátria ⇄ Reboleira (Metro)

== See also ==
- List of Lisbon metro stations
