= Rato Station =

Metro station in Lisbon, Portugal

Rato
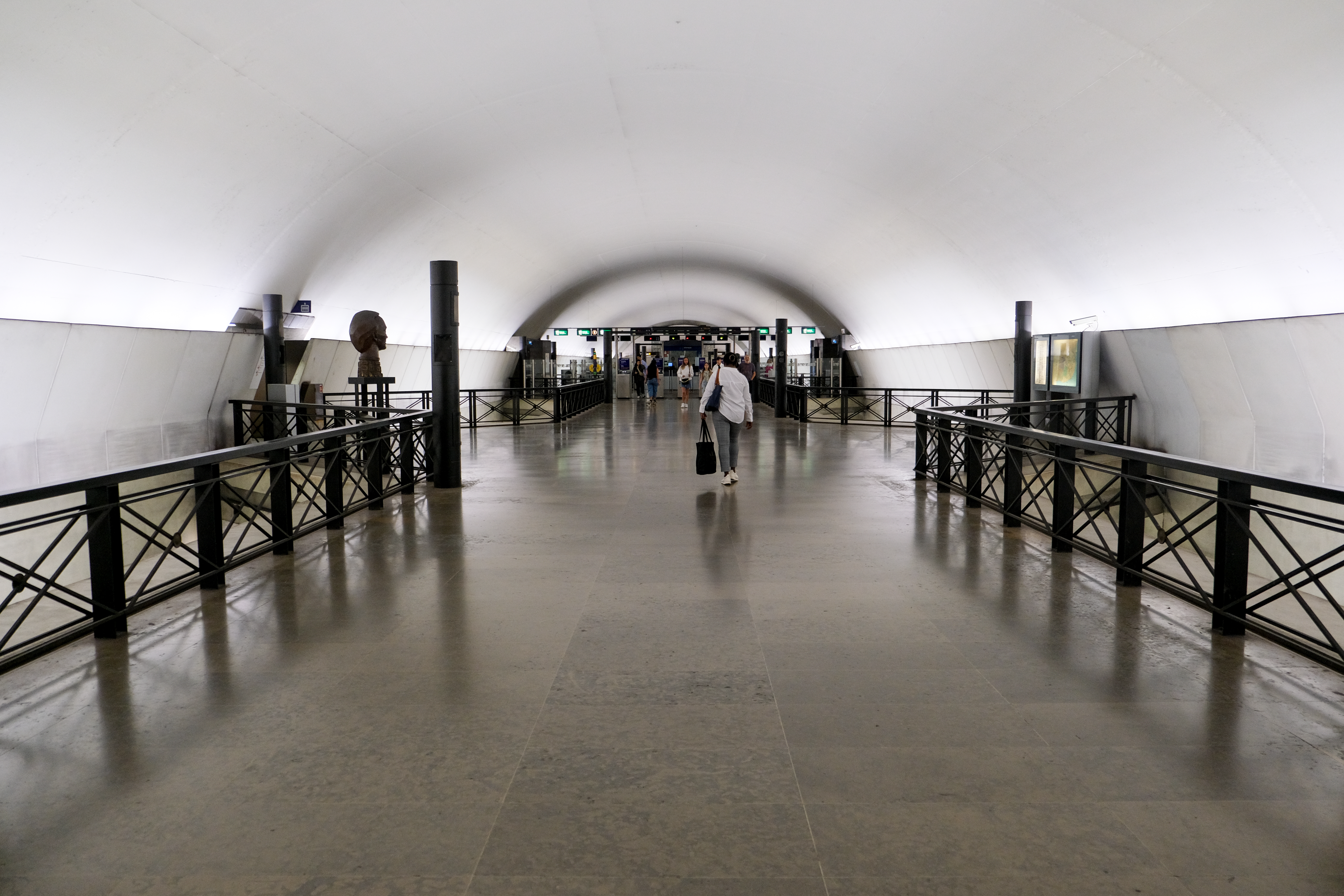

General information
- Location: Largo do Rato, Lisbon; Portugal
- Coordinates: 38°43′12″N 9°9′21″W
- Owner: Government-owned corporation
- Operator: Metropolitano de Lisboa, EPE
- Line: Yellow Line
- Platforms: 2 side platforms
- Tracks: 2

Construction
- Structure type: Underground
- Accessible: yes
- Architect: Sanchez Jorge

Other information
- Station code: RA
- Fare zone: L

History
- Opened: 29 October 1997 (28 years ago)

Services
| Preceding station | Lisbon Metro | Following station |
|---|---|---|
| Marquês de Pombal towards Odivelas | Yellow Line | Terminus |
Future service
| Estrela towards Telheiras | Green Line | Terminus |
Route map
Location

Rato station is the southern terminus of the Yellow Line of the Lisbon Metro.

== History ==
The station opened on 29 December 1997 and is located on Largo do Rato.

The architectural design of the station is by Sanchez Jorge.

== Connections ==
=== Urban buses ===
==== Carris ====
- 202 Cais do Sodré ⇄ Bairro Padre Cruz
- 706 Cais do Sodré ⇄ Estação Santa Apolónia
- 706 Restauradores ⇄ Campo de Ourique (Prazeres)
- 713 Alameda D. A. Henriques ⇄ Estação Campolide
- 720 Picheleira/Rua Faria Vasconcelos ⇄ Calvário
- 727 Estação Roma-Areeiro ⇄ Restelo - Av. das Descobertas
- 738 Quinta dos Barros ⇄ Alto de Santo Amaro
- 758 Cais do Sodré ⇄ Portas de Benfica
- 774 Campo de Ourique (Prazeres) ⇄ Gomes Freire

== See also ==
- List of Lisbon metro stations
