= Centro Vasco da Gama =

Shopping mall in Lisbon, Portugal

Coordinates: 38°46′4″N 9°5′49″W

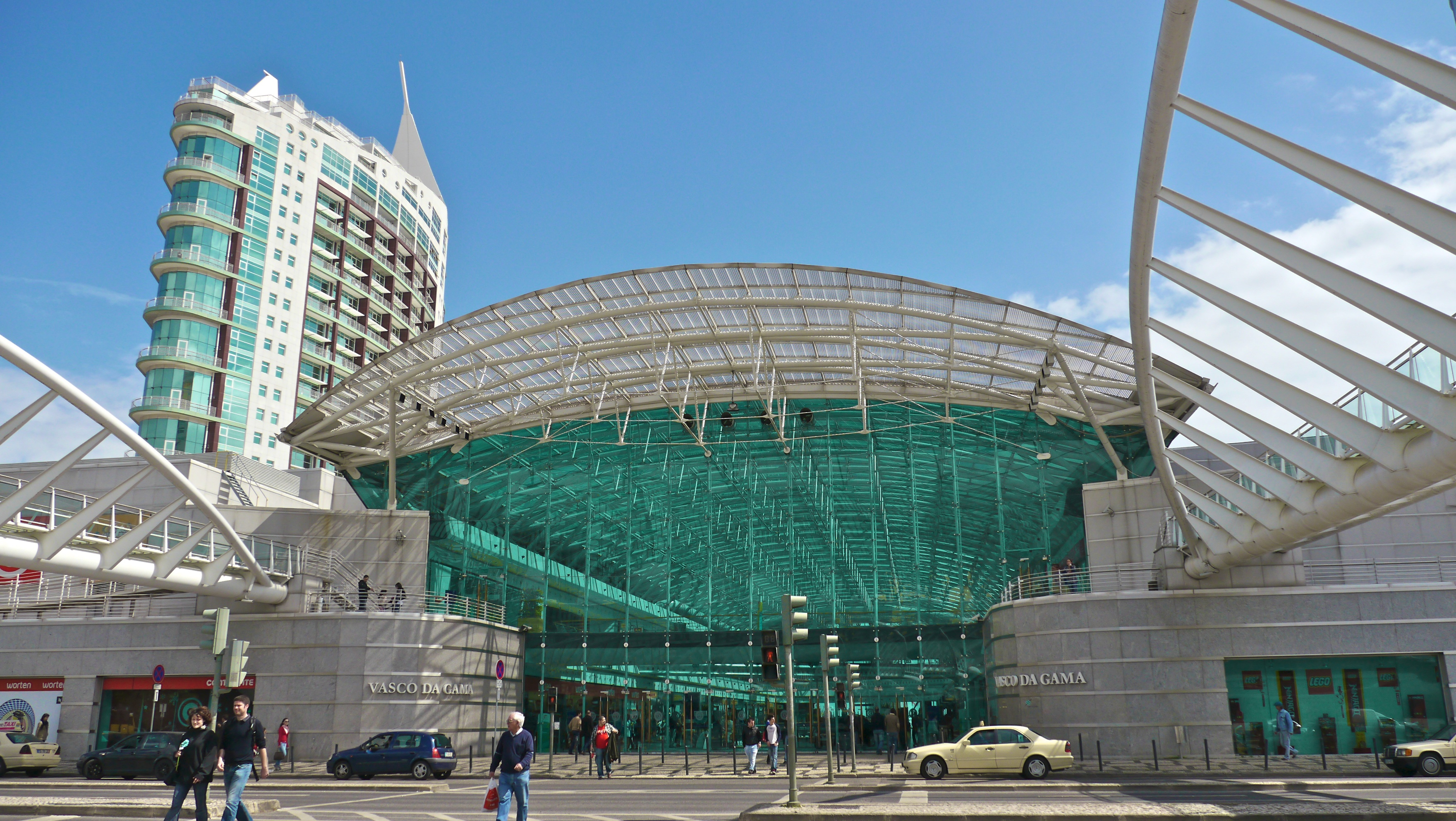
Centro Vasco da Gama

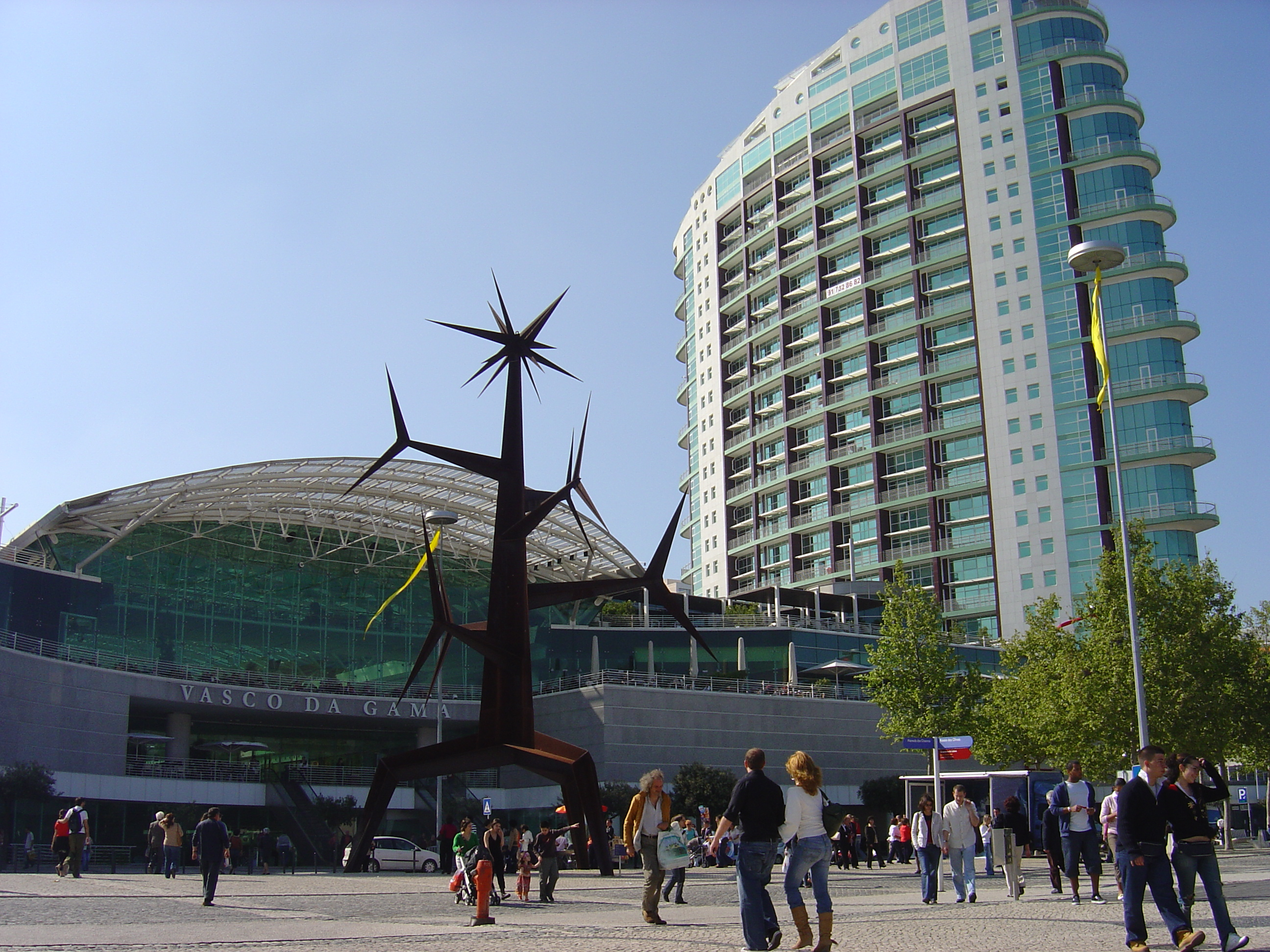
Centro Vasco da Gama

Centro Vasco da Gama is a shopping mall in Parque das Nações, Lisbon named for Portuguese explorer Vasco da Gama. The mall known for its unique architecture, extensive retail options, and integration with public transportation. Originally built for Expo '98, it features over 170 stores, numerous restaurants, a cinema, and a health club, all under a distinctive glass roof with views of the Tagus River. It's easily accessible via the Oriente train and metro station, making it a major hub for shopping and leisure.

The mall was designed by architect José Quintela, and its design was more technological in nature compared to Colombo Centre.
