= Henrique Sotero =

Portuguese rapist

The Telheiras rapist (Violador de Telheiras), real name Henrique Paulino Sotero (born 1980), is a Portuguese engineer and violent sex offender who admitted responsibility for around 40 rapes in the Greater Lisbon area from 2008 to 2009. His victims, almost all under 20 years old, mostly underage girls (13 – 17 years old), were attacked in isolated places and raped at knife-point. A Lisboner born in 1980 (30 years old when arrested), Sotero had a degree in chemical engineering awarded by the Lisbon-based Instituto Superior Técnico, and worked as a data analyst for ZON Multimédia. At the time of the scandal he was living with his long-time girlfriend in a recently purchased flat and planned to marry her. Before then he lived with his divorced mother. Henrique became known as the Telheiras rapist after Telheiras neighbourhood and subway station, Lisbon, the area where some of his crimes occurred. The rapist had the habit of attacking on Tuesdays, and, when interrogated by the Portuguese Judiciary Police (PJ), said that he could not control his sexual impulses. He was arrested on Friday, March 5, 2010, and detained at the PJ prison in Lisbon, where he remained until his case was heard in court. The rapist sought psychiatric help since October 2009. People who knew him said they were in shock after finding out that he was the man who had become known as the Telheiras rapist. The case caught the attention of the Portuguese media even before the arrest, and it was widely covered by major newspapers, radio and television networks both before and after the identification of the criminal. On September 13, 2011, Henrique Sotero, nicknamed the Telheiras rapist, was sentenced to 25 years in prison.
