= Alto dos Moinhos Station =

Metro station in Lisbon, Portugal

Alto dos Moinhos
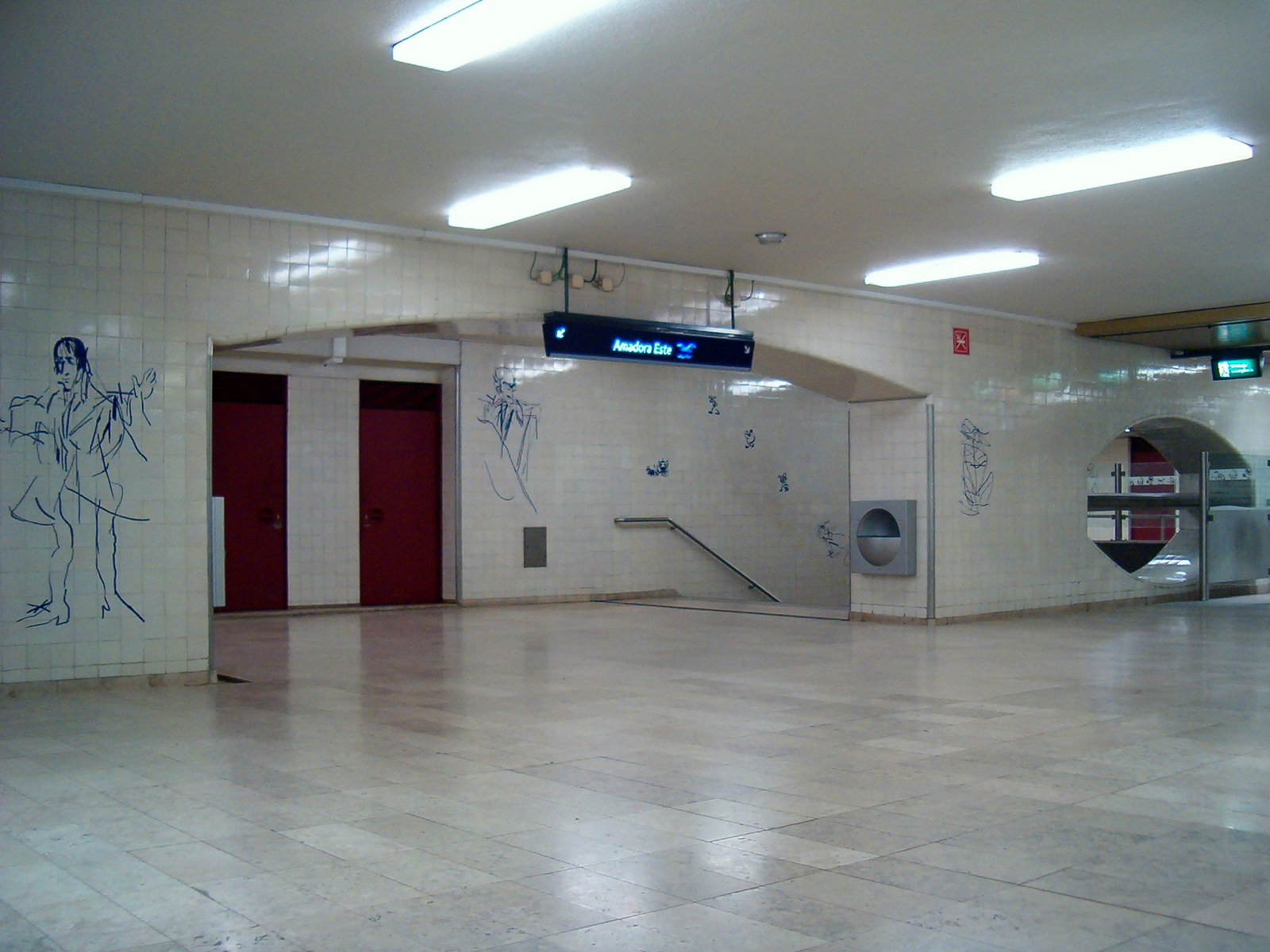

General information
- Location: Rua João de Freitas Branco, Lisbon; Portugal
- Coordinates: 38°44′58″N 9°10′47″W
- Owner: Government-owned corporation
- Operator: Metropolitano de Lisboa, EPE
- Line: Blue Line
- Platforms: 2 side platforms
- Tracks: 2

Construction
- Structure type: Underground
- Accessible: No
- Architect: Ezequiel Nicolau

Other information
- Station code: AH
- Fare zone: L

History
- Opened: October 14, 1988 (37 years ago)

Services
Preceding station	Lisbon Metro	Following station
Colégio Militar/Luz towards Reboleira	Blue Line	Laranjeiras towards Santa Apolónia
Route map
Location

Alto dos Moinhos station is part of the Blue Line of the Lisbon Metro and is located close to Estádio da Luz, home of SL Benfica. It is 8 km (5.0 mi) from the Lisbon neighbourhood of the same name.

== History ==
The station opened in October 14, 1988, in conjunction with the Colégio Militar and Laranjeiras stations, and it is located on Rua João de Freitas Branco, under the Avenida Lusíada viaduct.

The architectural design of the station is by Ezequiel Nicolau. Since July 26, 1994, the Museu da Música is located inside this station.

== Connections ==
=== Urban buses ===
==== Carris ====
- 754 Campo Pequeno ⇄ Afragide
- 768 Cidade Universitária ⇄ Quinta dos Alcoutins

== See also ==
- List of Lisbon metro stations
