= Museu Nacional da Música =

Museum of Music
- Museu da Música
- Location: Palace of Mafra, Portugal
- Coordinates: 38.7494°N 9.1797°W
- Key holdings: 1725 Stradivarius cello once owned and played by King Luís I of Portugal

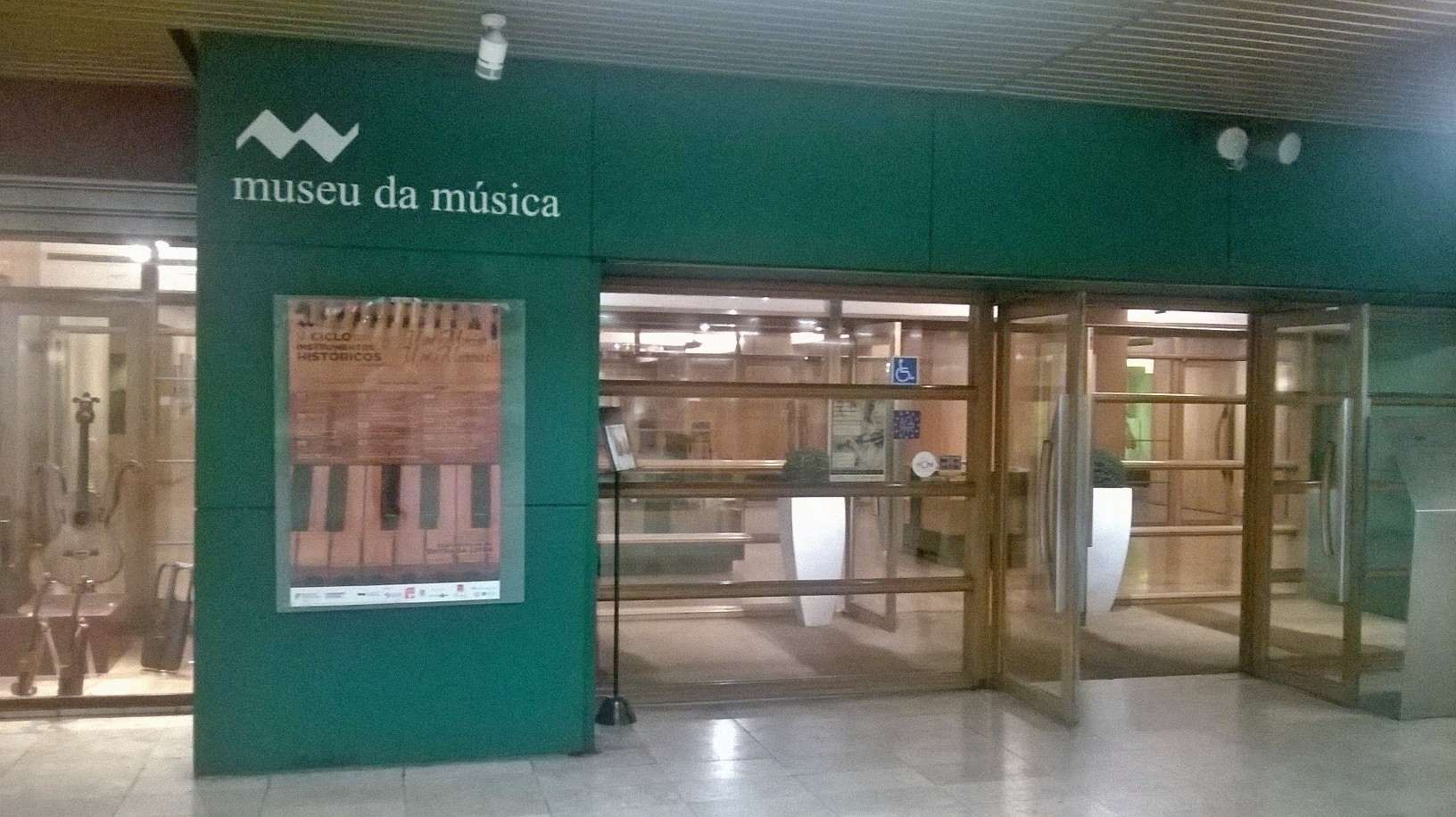
Main entrance from the Alto dos Moinhos underground station

The Museu da Música ("Museum of Music") is a museum in the Palace of Mafra, Portugal. The museum primarily features musical instruments; among its holdings is a 1725 Stradivarius cello once owned and played by King Luís I of Portugal (ruled 1861–1889.

== See also ==
- List of music museums
