= Laranjeiras Station =

Metro station in Lisbon, Portugal

Laranjeiras
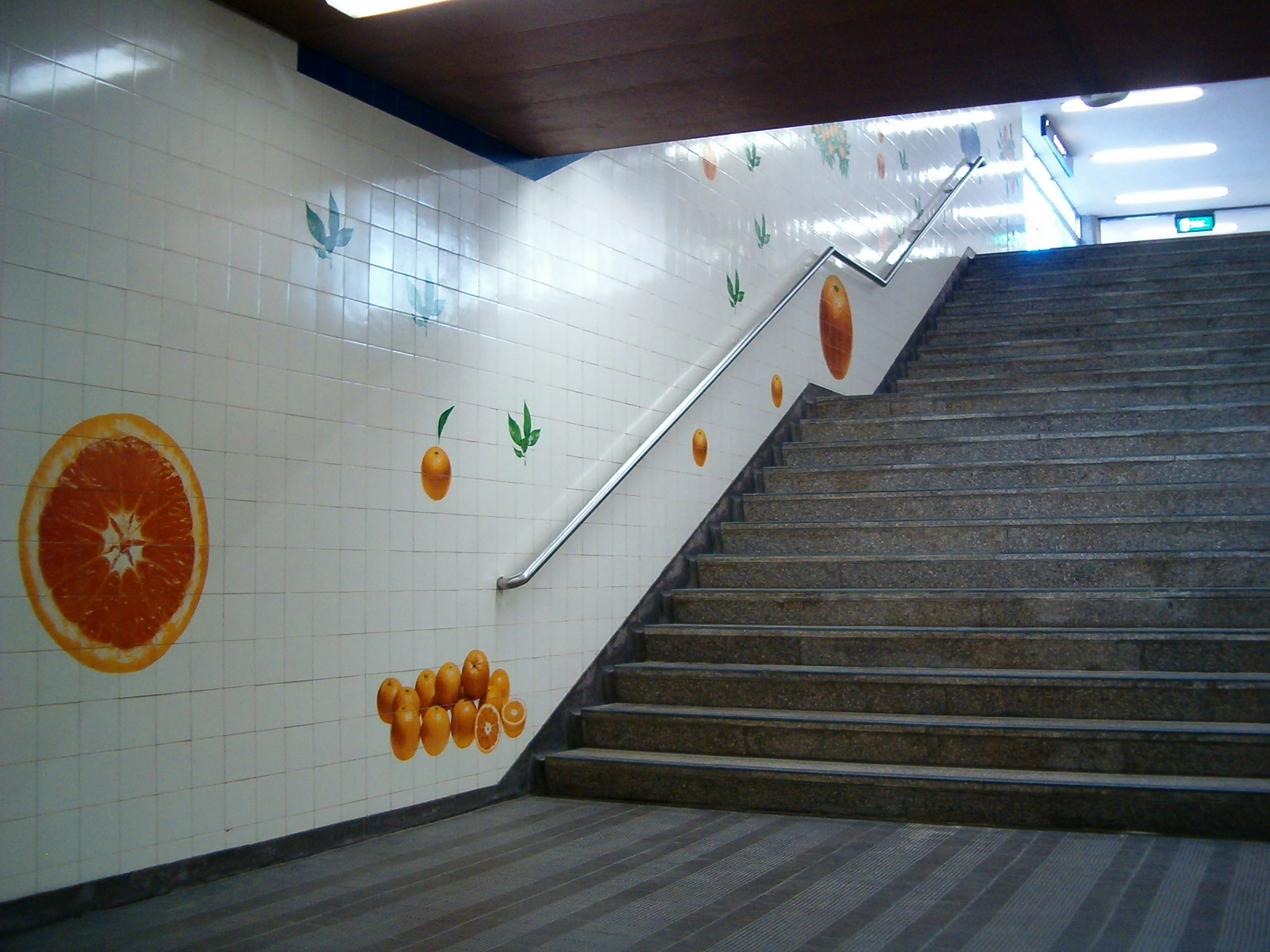

General information
- Location: Estrada das Laranjeiras, Lisbon; Portugal
- Coordinates: 38°44′53″N 9°10′19″W
- Owner: Government-owned corporation
- Operator: Metropolitano de Lisboa, EPE
- Line: Blue Line
- Platforms: 2 side platforms
- Tracks: 2

Construction
- Structure type: Underground
- Accessible: No
- Architect: António J. Mendes

Other information
- Station code: LA
- Fare zone: L

History
- Opened: 14 October 1988 (37 years ago)

Services
Preceding station	Lisbon Metro	Following station
Alto dos Moinhos towards Reboleira	Blue Line	Jardim Zoológico towards Santa Apolónia
Route map
Location

Laranjeiras station is part of the Blue Line of the Lisbon Metro and is located in the Palma de Baixo neighbourhood.

== History ==
Laranjeiras station opened on 14 October 1988 in conjunction with the Colégio Militar and Alto dos Moinhos stations. It is located on Estrada das Laranjeiras, after which it is named.

The architectural design of the station is by António J. Mendes.

== Connections ==
=== Urban buses ===
==== Carris ====
- 701 Campo Grande (Metro) ⇄ Campo de Ourique (Prazeres)
- 726 Sapadores ⇄ Pontinha Centro
- 764 Cidade Universitária ⇄ Damaia de Cima

== See also ==
- List of Lisbon metro stations
