= Colégio Militar/Luz Station =

Metro station in Lisbon, Portugal

Colégio Militar/Luz
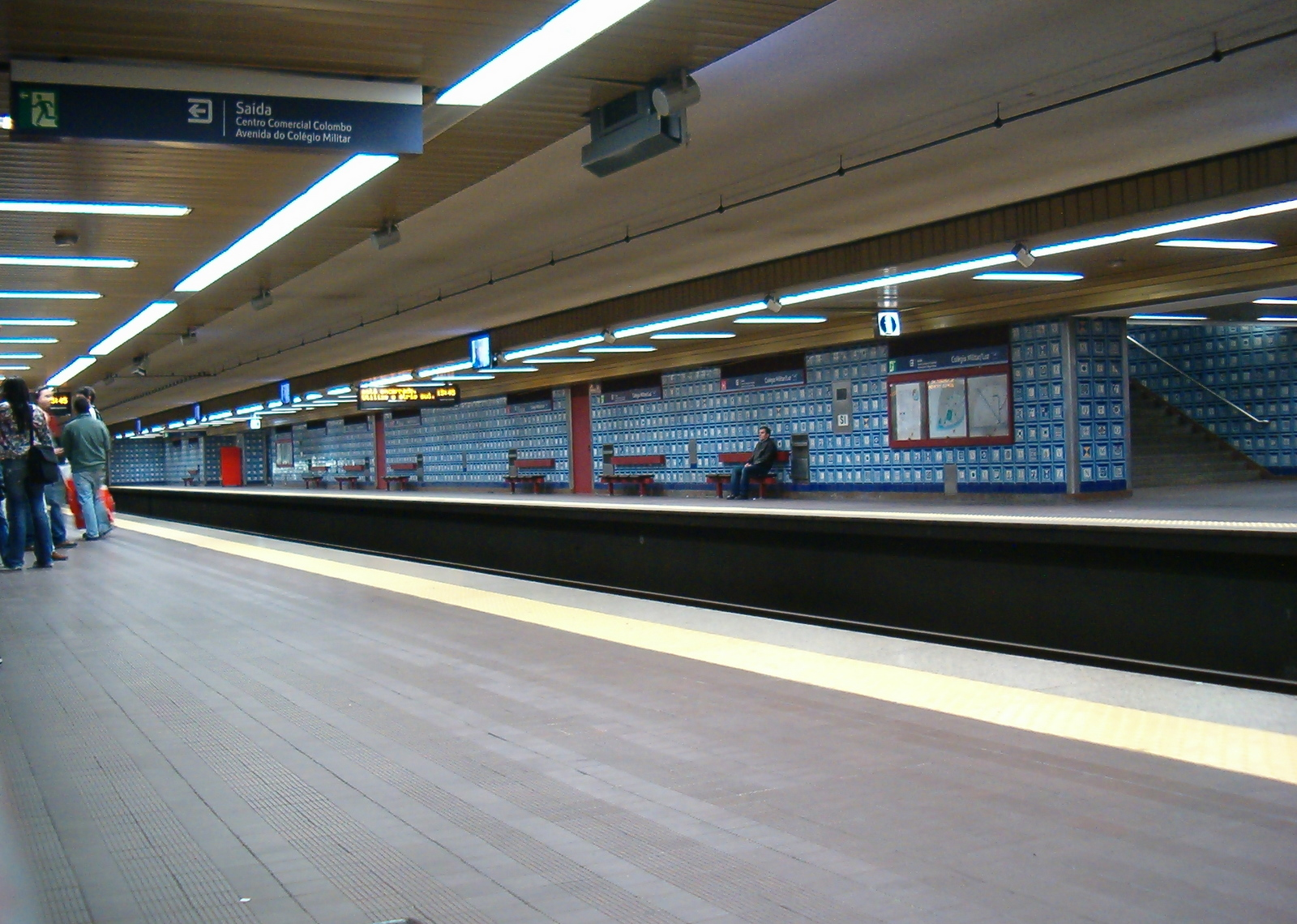

General information
- Location: Avenida do Colégio Militar, Lisbon; Portugal
- Coordinates: 38°45′9″N 9°11′20″W
- Owner: Government-owned corporation
- Operator: Metropolitano de Lisboa, EPE
- Line: Blue Line
- Platforms: 2 side platforms
- Tracks: 2

Construction
- Structure type: Underground
- Accessible: Yes
- Architect: António J. Mendes

Other information
- Station code: CM
- Fare zone: L

History
- Opened: 14 October 1988 (37 years ago)
- Rebuilt: 2019–2020

Services
Preceding station	Lisbon Metro	Following station
Carnide towards Reboleira	Blue Line	Alto dos Moinhos towards Santa Apolónia
Route map
Location

Colégio Militar/Luz is a metro station in Lisbon, Portugal. It is part of the Blue Line of the Lisbon Metro.

== History ==
The station opened on 14 October 1988, in conjunction with the Alto dos Moinhos and Laranjeiras stations, and it is located on Avenida do Colégio Militar, close to the military school from which it takes its name and Estádio da Luz, home of S.L. Benfica. Built over it is an important bus terminal and the shopping mall Colombo Centre.

The architectural design of the station is by António J. Mendes.

Throughout 2019, lifts were expected to be added to this station, making the station accessible for persons with disabilities.

== Connections ==
=== Urban buses ===
==== Carris ====
- 703 Charneca ⇄ Bairro de Santa Cruz
- 729 Bairro Padre Cruz ⇄ Algés
- 750 Estação Oriente (Interface) ⇄ Algés
- 764 Cidade Universitária ⇄ Damaia de Cima
- 765 Colégio Militar (Metro) ⇄ Rua João Ortigão Ramos
- 767 Campo Mártires da Pátria ⇄ Reboleira (Metro)
- 799 Colégio Militar (Metro) ⇄ Alfragide Norte

=== Suburban buses ===
==== Rodoviária de Lisboa ====
- 210 Lisboa (Colégio Militar) ⇄ Caneças (Jardim)

=== Vimeca / Lisboa Transportes ===
- 101 Lisboa (Colégio Militar) ⇄ Tercena
- 128 Casal da Mira (Dolce Vita Tejo) ⇄ Lisboa (Colégio Militar)
- 132 A-da-Beja (Largo) ⇄ Lisboa (Colégio Militar)
- 142 Casal da Mira (Dolce Vita Tejo) ⇄ Lisboa (Colégio Militar)
- 163 Lisboa (Colégio Militar) ⇄ Massamá (Casal do Olival)

== See also ==
- List of Lisbon metro stations
