= Estádio da Luz =

Football stadium in Lisbon, Portugal

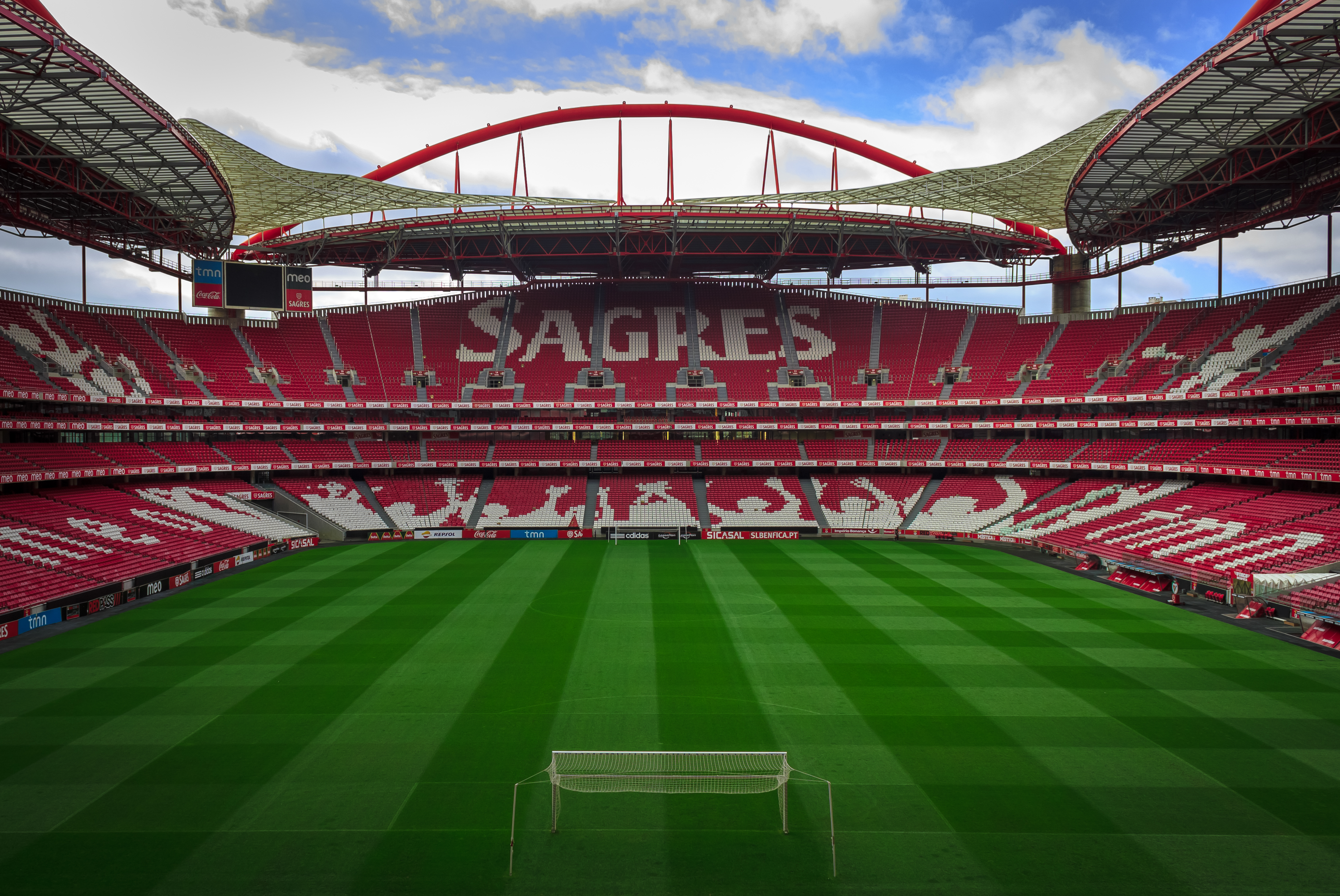
- UEFA
- Interactive map of Estádio da Luz
- Full name: Estádio do Sport Lisboa e Benfica
- Address: Av. Eusébio da Silva Ferreira, 1500-313
- Location: Lisbon, Portugal
- Coordinates: 38.7527°N 9.1847°W
- Owner: Benfica
- Operator: Benfica
- Capacity: 68,100
- Executive suites: 156
- Surface: Grass
- Scoreboard: Yes
- Record attendance: 66,387 (17 February 2026); SL Benfica 0–1 Real Madrid
- Field size: 105 x 68 m
- Public transit: Azul at Alto dos Moinhos; Azul at Colégio Militar/Luz

Construction
- Groundbreaking: 2003
- Opened: 25 October 2003
- Cost: €160 million
- Architect: HOK Sport (now Populous)

Tenants
- Benfica (2003–present); Benfica B (2003–2006, 2012–2013); Benfica women (2018–present; selected matches); Portugal national football team (selected matches)

Website
- slbenfica.pt

The Estádio da Luz (Portuguese pronunciation: [ɨˈʃtaðju ðɐ ˈluʃ]), officially named Estádio do Sport Lisboa e Benfica, is a multi-purpose stadium located in Lisbon, Portugal. It is owned by association football club Sport Lisboa e Benfica, and hosts the club's home matches.

Opened on 25 October 2003 with an exhibition match between Benfica and Uruguayan club Nacional, it replaced the original Estádio da Luz, which between 1985 and 1994 had a capacity of 120,000 seats. The seating capacity of the new stadium is currently set at 68,100. The stadium was designed by HOK Sport Venue Event (now Populous) and had a construction cost of €160 million, of which €22,596,688 was supported by the Government of Portugal for the UEFA Euro 2004.

A UEFA category four stadium and one of the biggest stadiums by capacity in Europe (the biggest in Portugal), Estádio da Luz hosted several matches of the UEFA Euro 2004, including its final, as well as the 2014 and 2020 finals of the UEFA Champions League. It was elected the most beautiful stadium of Europe in a 2014 online poll by L'Équipe. By its fifteenth birthday, Estádio do Sport Lisboa e Benfica Luz had welcomed more than 17 million spectators. The stadium is one of the potential venues for the 2030 FIFA World Cup, which Portugal will co-host along with Morocco and Spain.

== Naming ==
While the previous Benfica stadium was also officially named "Estádio do Sport Lisboa e Benfica", both the old and the new stadia are invariably referred to by their unofficial name, Estádio da Luz. Luz is the name of the neighborhood the stadium was built on, on the border between the parishes of Benfica and Carnide, which itself derives its name from the nearby Igreja de Nossa Senhora da Luz (Church of Our Lady of Light). This unofficial name caught on soon after the original stadium's construction; the people of Lisbon used to simply call it a Luz ("the Light"). Therefore, the stadium's common name became "Estádio da Luz", which is usually anglicised to "Stadium of Light". This translation, however, could be argued to be inaccurate, since Luz refers not to "light" but to the original address of the stadium: Estrada da Luz ("Road of Light").

== Characteristics ==
Architect Damon Lavelle, from HOK Sport Venue Event (now Populous), designed the stadium to focus on light and transparency. Its polycarbonate roof allows the sunlight to penetrate the stadium in order to illuminate it. The roof, which is supported by tie-beams of four steel arches, seems to float on the underlying tribunes. The arches are 43 metres (141 feet) high and help define the look of the stadium, after having been shaped to be similar to the wavy profile of its three tiers. According to Lavelle, the seating capacity may be increased up from 64,642 to 80,000. However, the most realistic option is to expand by selling standing places, which would require a change in the law.

In June 2024, Benfica announced that it would increase the stadium's capacity to nearly 66,000 spectators by adding 950 seats in a row of seats around the stadium reserved for people with motor disabilities.

In July 2025, Benfica concluded renovations and increased the stadium capacity to 68,100 spectators.

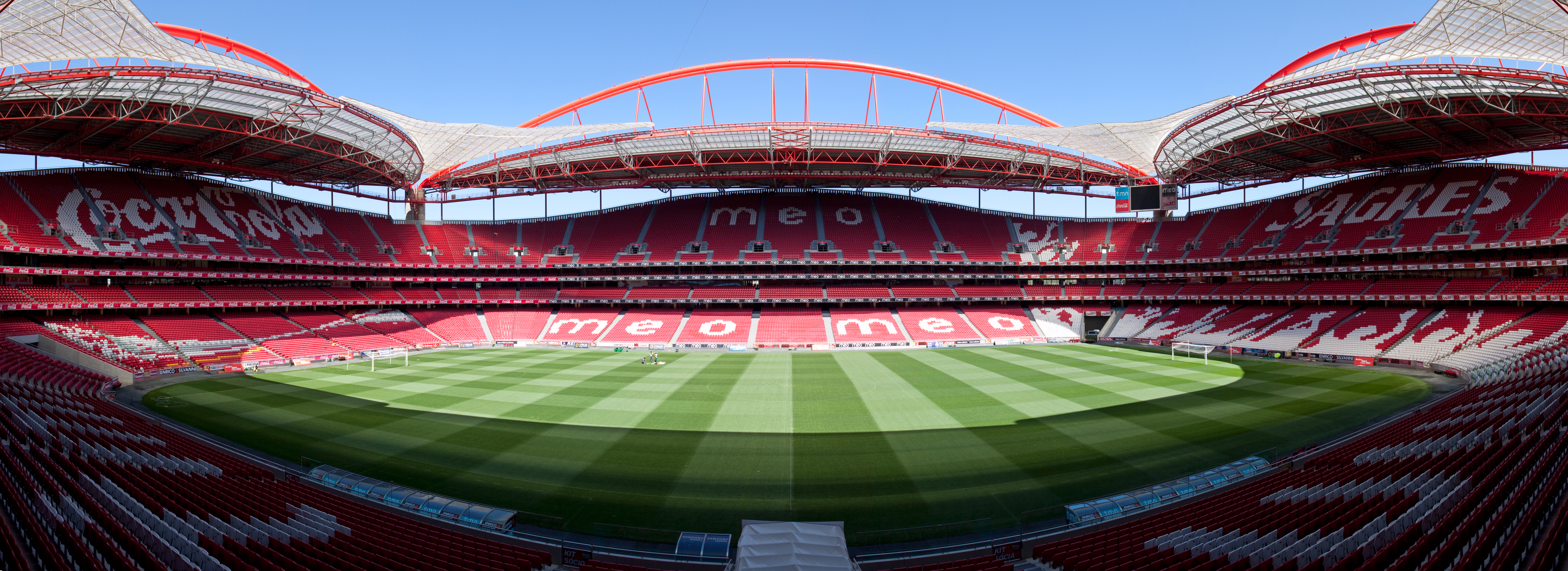
A panorama of the Estádio da Luz on 30 July 2009

== Sports events ==
=== Opening game ===
25 October 2003
21:05 WEST

| Benfica (Portugal) | 2–1 | (Uruguay) Nacional |
|---|---|---|
| Nuno Gomes 7', 47' | Report | Mello 11' |

Attendance: 65,400
Referee: Pedro Proença (Portugal)

In the opening match, Benfica beat Uruguayan side Nacional 2–1 with goals from Nuno Gomes, who became the first ever scorer at the Estádio da Luz.

=== UEFA Euro 2004 Final ===
4 July 2004
19:45 WEST

| Portugal | 0–1 | Greece |
|---|---|---|
| | Report | Charisteas 57' |

Attendance: 62,865
Referee: Markus Merk (Germany)

=== 2014 UEFA Champions League final ===
24 May 2014
19:45 WEST

| Real Madrid (Spain) | 4–1 (a.e.t.) | (Spain) Atlético Madrid |
|---|---|---|
| Ramos 90+3'; Bale 110'; Marcelo 118'; Ronaldo 120' (pen.) | Report | Godín 36' |

Attendance: 60,976
Referee: Björn Kuipers (Netherlands)

=== 2019–20 UEFA Champions League ===
Quarter-finals

14 August 2020
20:00 WEST

| Barcelona (Spain) | 2–8 | (Germany) Bayern Munich |
|---|---|---|
| Alaba 7' (o.g.); Suárez 57' | Report | Müller 4', 31'; Perišić 22'; Gnabry 27'; Kimmich 63'; Lewandowski 82'; Coutinho 85', 89' |

Attendance: 0 (Note: The match was played behind closed doors to comply with restrictions during the COVID-19 pandemic.)
Referee: Damir Skomina (Slovenia)

Final

23 August 2020
20:00 WEST

| Paris Saint-Germain (France) | 0–1 | (Germany) Bayern Munich |
|---|---|---|
| | Report | Coman 59' |

Attendance: 0
Referee: Daniele Orsato (Italy)

=== Highest attendance official match ===
17 February 2026
20:00 WET

| Benfica (Portugal) | 0–1 | (Spain) Real Madrid |
|---|---|---|
| | Report | Vinicius Júnior 50' |

Attendance: 66,387
Referee: François Letexier (France)

The official record was broken in the Round of 32 match of the 2025–26 Champions League.

=== Portugal national team matches ===
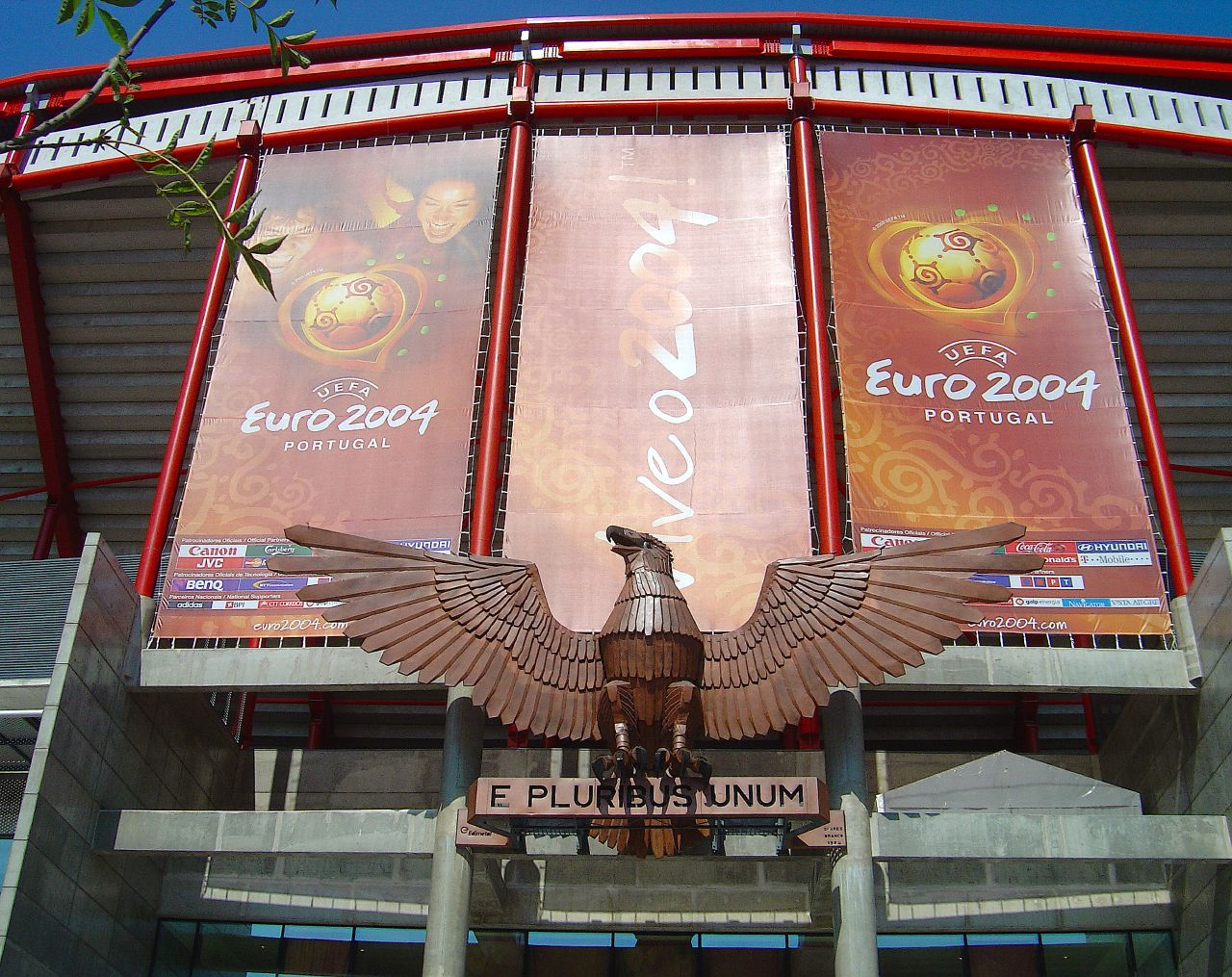
Entrance of the stadium during UEFA Euro 2004

The following national team matches were held in the stadium.

| # | Date | Score | Opponent | Competition |
|---|---|---|---|---|
| 1. | 16 June 2004 | 2–0 | Russia | Euro 2004 Group Stage |
| 2. | 24 June 2004 | 2–2 | England | Euro 2004 Quarter-Finals |
| 3. | 4 July 2004 | 0–1 | Greece | Euro 2004 Final |
| 4. | 4 June 2005 | 2–0 | Slovakia | 2006 World Cup qualification |
| 5. | 8 September 2007 | 2–2 | Poland | Euro 2008 qualifying |
| 6. | 10 October 2009 | 3–0 | Hungary | 2010 World Cup qualification |
| 7. | 14 November 2009 | 1–0 | Bosnia and Herzegovina | 2010 World Cup UEFA play-offs |
| 8. | 17 November 2010 | 4–0 | Spain | Friendly |
| 9. | 4 June 2011 | 1–0 | Norway | Euro 2012 qualifying |
| 10. | 15 November 2011 | 6–2 | Bosnia and Herzegovina | Euro 2012 qualifying play-offs |
| 11. | 2 June 2012 | 1–3 | Turkey | Friendly |
| 12. | 7 June 2013 | 1–0 | Russia | 2014 World Cup qualification |
| 13. | 15 November 2013 | 1–0 | Sweden | 2014 World Cup UEFA play-offs |
| 14. | 29 March 2015 | 2–1 | Serbia | Euro 2016 qualifying |
| 15. | 8 June 2016 | 7–0 | Estonia | Friendly |
| 16. | 25 March 2017 | 3–0 | Hungary | 2018 World Cup qualification |
| 17. | 10 October 2017 | 2–0 | Switzerland | 2018 World Cup qualification |
| 18. | 7 June 2018 | 3–0 | Algeria | Friendly |
| 19. | 10 September 2018 | 1–0 | Italy | 2018–19 UEFA Nations League |
| 20. | 22 March 2019 | 0–0 | Ukraine | Euro 2020 qualifying |
| 21. | 25 March 2019 | 1–1 | Serbia | Euro 2020 qualifying |
| 22. | 11 November 2020 | 7–0 | Andorra | Friendly |
| 23. | 14 November 2020 | 0–1 | France | 2020–21 UEFA Nations League |
| 24. | 14 November 2021 | 1–2 | Serbia | 2022 FIFA World Cup qualification |
| 25. | 17 June 2023 | 3–0 | Bosnia and Herzegovina | UEFA Euro 2024 qualifying |
| 26. | 5 September 2024 | 2–1 | Croatia | 2024–25 UEFA Nations League |
| 27. | 8 September 2024 | 2–1 | Scotland | 2024–25 UEFA Nations League |

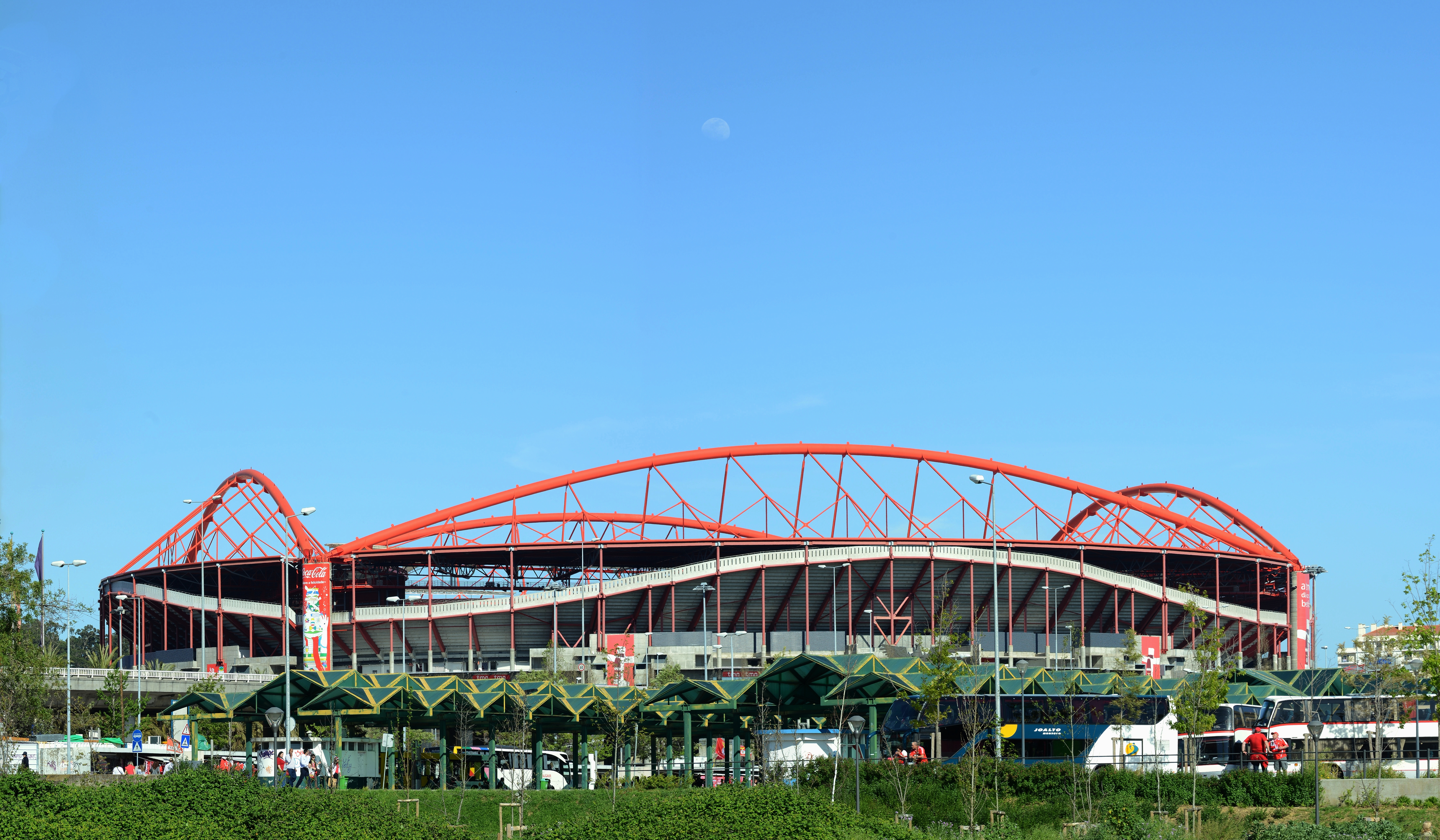
The exterior of Estádio da Luz in 2013

=== UEFA Euro 2004 ===
| Date | Team #1 | Result | Team #2 | Round | Attendance |
|---|---|---|---|---|---|
| 13 June 2004 | France | 2–1 | England | Group B | 62,487 |
| 16 June 2004 | Russia | 0–2 | Portugal | Group A | 59,273 |
| 21 June 2004 | Croatia | 2–4 | England | Group B | 57,047 |
| 24 June 2004 | Portugal | 2–2 (6–5 p) | England | Quarter-finals | 62,564 |
| 4 July 2004 | Portugal | 0–1 | Greece | Final | 62,864 |

=== Benfica matches in UEFA competitions ===
Games played before 1 August 2026

*2003–04 UEFA Cup
- 3–1 Molde
- 1–0 Rosenborg
- 0–0 Inter Milan
- 2004–05
- 1–0 Anderlecht (UEFA Champions League)
- 2–0 Dukla Banská Bystrica (UEFA Cup)
- 4–2 Heerenveen
- 2–0 Dinamo Zagreb
- 1–1 CSKA Moscow
- 2005–06 UEFA Champions League
- 1–0 Lille
- 0–1 Villarreal
- 2–1 Manchester United
- 1–0 Liverpool
- 0–0 Barcelona
- 2006–07
- 3–0 Austria Wien (UEFA Champions League)
- 0–1 Manchester United
- 3–0 Celtic
- 3–1 Copenhagen
- 1–0 Dinamo București (UEFA Cup)
- 3–1 Paris Saint-Germain
- 0–0 Espanyol
- 2007–08
- 2–1 Copenhagen (UEFA Champions League)
- 0–1 Shakhtar Donetsk
- 1–0 Celtic
- 1–1 Milan
- 1–0 Nürnberg (UEFA Cup)
- 1–2 Getafe
- 2008–09 UEFA Cup
- 2–0 Napoli
- 0–2 Galatasaray
- 0–1 Metalist Kharkiv
- 2009–10 UEFA Europa League
- 4–0 Vorskla
- 2–0 BATE Borisov
- 5–0 Everton
- 2–1 AEK Athens
- 4–0 Hertha Berlin
- 1–1 Marseille
- 2–1 Liverpool
- 2010–11
- 2–0 Hapoel (UEFA Champions League)
- 4–3 Lyon
- 1–2 Schalke 04
- 2–1 Stuttgart (UEFA Europa League)
- 2–1 Paris Saint-Germain
- 4–1 PSV Eindhoven
- 2–1 Braga
- 2011–12 UEFA Champions League
- 2–0 Trabzonspor
- 3–1 Twente
- 1–1 Manchester United
- 1–1 Basel
- 1–0 Oțelul Galați
- 2–0 Zenit
- 0–1 Chelsea
- 2012–13
- 0–2 Barcelona (UEFA Champions League)
- 2–0 Spartak Moscow
- 2–1 Celtic
- 2–1 Bayer Leverkusen (UEFA Europa League)
- 1–0 Bordeaux
- 3–1 Newcastle United
- 3–1 Fenerbahçe
- 2013–14
- 2–0 Anderlecht (UEFA Champions League)
- 1–1 Olympiacos
- 2–1 Paris Saint-Germain
- 3–0 PAOK (UEFA Europa League)
- 2–2 Tottenham
- 2–0 AZ Alkmaar
- 2–1 Juventus
- 2014–15 UEFA Champions League
- 0–2 Zenit
- 1–0 Monaco
- 0–0 Bayer Leverkusen
- 2015–16 UEFA Champions League
- 2–0 Astana
- 2–1 Galatasaray
- 1–2 Atlético Madrid
- 1–0 Zenit
- 2–2 Bayern Munich
- 2016–17 UEFA Champions League
- 1–1 Beşiktaş
- 1–0 Dynamo Kyiv
- 1–2 Napoli
- 1–0 Borussia Dortmund
- 2017–18 UEFA Champions League
- 1–2 CSKA Moscow
- 0–1 Manchester United
- 0–2 Basel
- 2018–19
- 1–0 Fenerbahçe (UEFA Champions League)
- 1–1 PAOK
- 0–2 Bayern Munich
- 1–1 Ajax
- 1–0 AEK Athens
- 0–0 Galatasaray (UEFA Europa League)
- 3–0 Dinamo Zagreb
- 4–2 Eintracht Frankfurt
- 2019–20
- 1–2 RB Leipzig (UEFA Champions League)
- 2–1 Lyon
- 3–0 Zenit
- 3–3 Shakhtar Donetsk (UEFA Europa League)
- 2020–21 UEFA Europa League
- 3–0 Standard Liège
- 3–3 Rangers
- 4–0 Lech Poznań
- 2021–22 UEFA Champions League
- 2–0 Spartak Moscow
- 2–1 PSV Eindhoven
- 3–0 Barcelona
- 0–4 Bayern Munich
- 2–0 Dynamo Kyiv
- 2–2 Ajax
- 1–3 Liverpool
- 2022–23 UEFA Champions League
- 4–1 Midtjylland
- 3–0 Dynamo Kyiv
- 1–0 Maccabi Haifa
- 1–1 Paris Saint-Germain
- 4–3 Juventus
- 5–1 Club Brugge
- 0–2 Inter Milan
- 2023–24
- 0–2 Red Bull Salzburg (UEFA Champions League)
- 0–1 Real Sociedad
- 2–1 Toulouse (UEFA Europa League)
- 2–2 Rangers
- 2–1 Marseille
- 2024–25 (UEFA Champions League)
- 4–0 Atlético Madrid
- 1–3 Feyenoord
- 4–5 Barcelona
- 0–1 Barcelona
- 2025-26 (UEFA Champions League)
- 2–0 Nice
- 1–0 Fenerbahçe
- 2–3 Qarabağ FK
- 0–1 Bayer Leverkusen
- 2–0 SSC Napoli
- 4–2 Real Madrid
- 0–1 Real Madrid
- 2026-27 (UEFA Europa League)
- ?—? Sankt Gallen

- All-time statistics

117 matches: 75 wins, 21 draws, 28 losses
212 goals scored, 115 goals conceded

== Other events ==
=== Ceremonies ===
| Date | Organizing entity | Event | Total audience |
|---|---|---|---|
| 7 July 2007 | New 7 Wonders Foundation | New 7 Wonders of the World | 50,000 |

=== Concerts ===
| Date | Artist/band | Concert tour | Total audience |
|---|---|---|---|
| 1–2 June 2019 | Ed Sheeran | ÷ Tour | 120,716 |
| 26 June 2023 | Rammstein | Rammstein Stadium Tour | 50,000 |
| 24–25 May 2024 | Taylor Swift | The Eras Tour | 120,000 |
| 7 June 2025 | Calema | Tournée 15 anos | 60,000 |
| 26 June 2025 | Imagine Dragons | Loom World Tour | 60,000 |
| 26–27 May 2026 | Bad Bunny | Debí Tirar Más Fotos World Tour | 120,000 |
| 7 July 2026 | Iron Maiden | Run for Your Lives World Tour | 60,000 |
| 18 June 2027 | Karol G | Viajando Por El Mundo Tropitour | |

=== Religious meetings ===
| Date | Organizing entity | Event | Total audience |
|---|---|---|---|
| 28–30 June 2019 | International Convention of Jehovah's Witnesses | Love Never Fails | 63,390 |
| 4 August 2023 | World Youth Day | The Change | 44,000 |

== See also ==
- List of football stadiums in Portugal
- Lists of stadiums

== Notes ==
| Preceded by De Kuip; Rotterdam | UEFA European Championship; Final venue 2004 | Succeeded by Ernst-Happel-Stadion; Vienna |
| Preceded by Wembley Stadium; London | UEFA Champions League; Final venue 2014 | Succeeded by Olympiastadion; Berlin |
| Preceded by Metropolitano Stadium; Madrid | UEFA Champions League; Final venue 2020 | Succeeded by Estádio do Dragão; Porto |
