= Colombo Centre =

Shopping mall in Lisbon, Portugal

Coordinates: 38°45′16″N 9°11′18″W

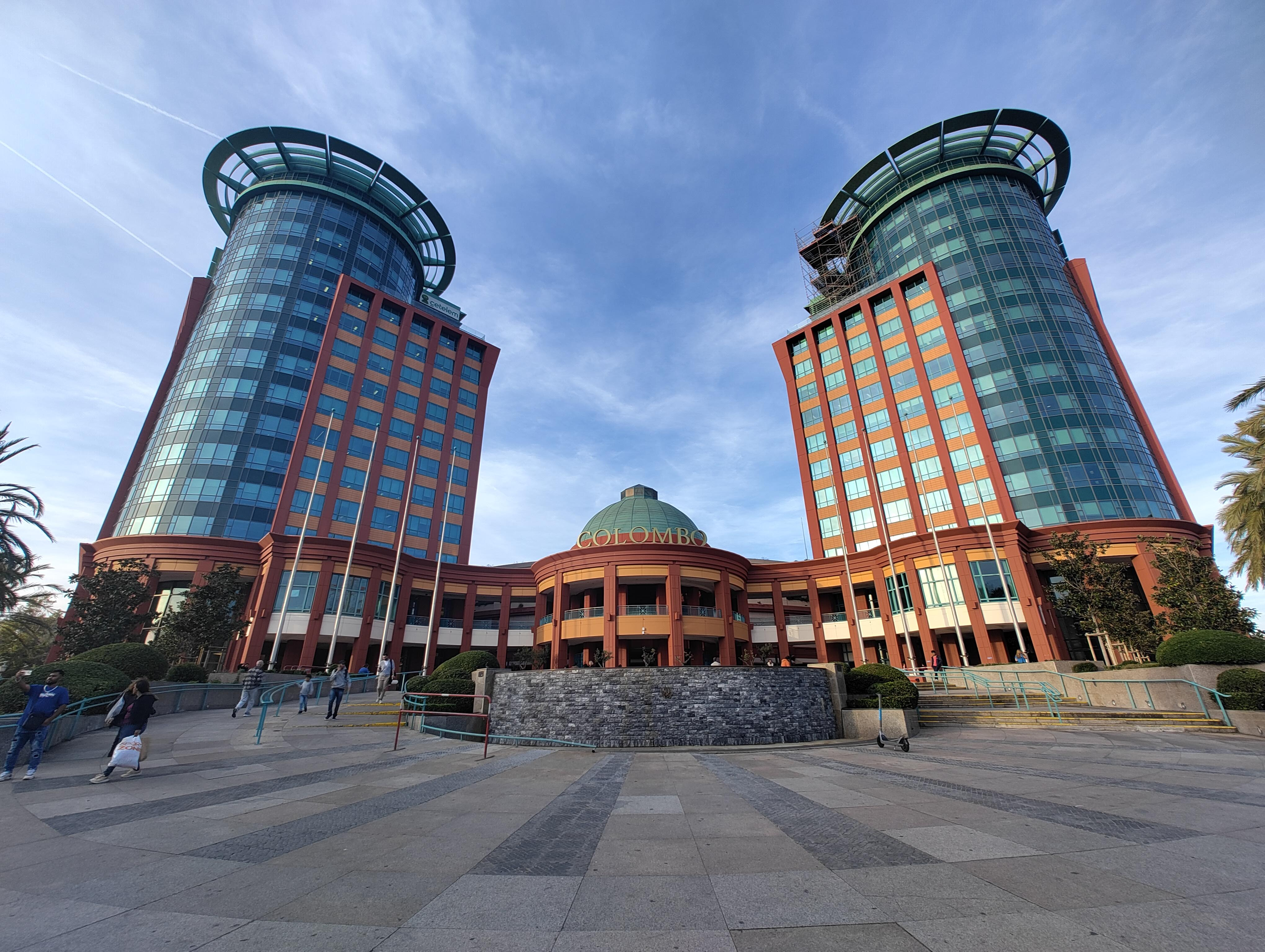
South entrance of Colombo Centre in November 2023

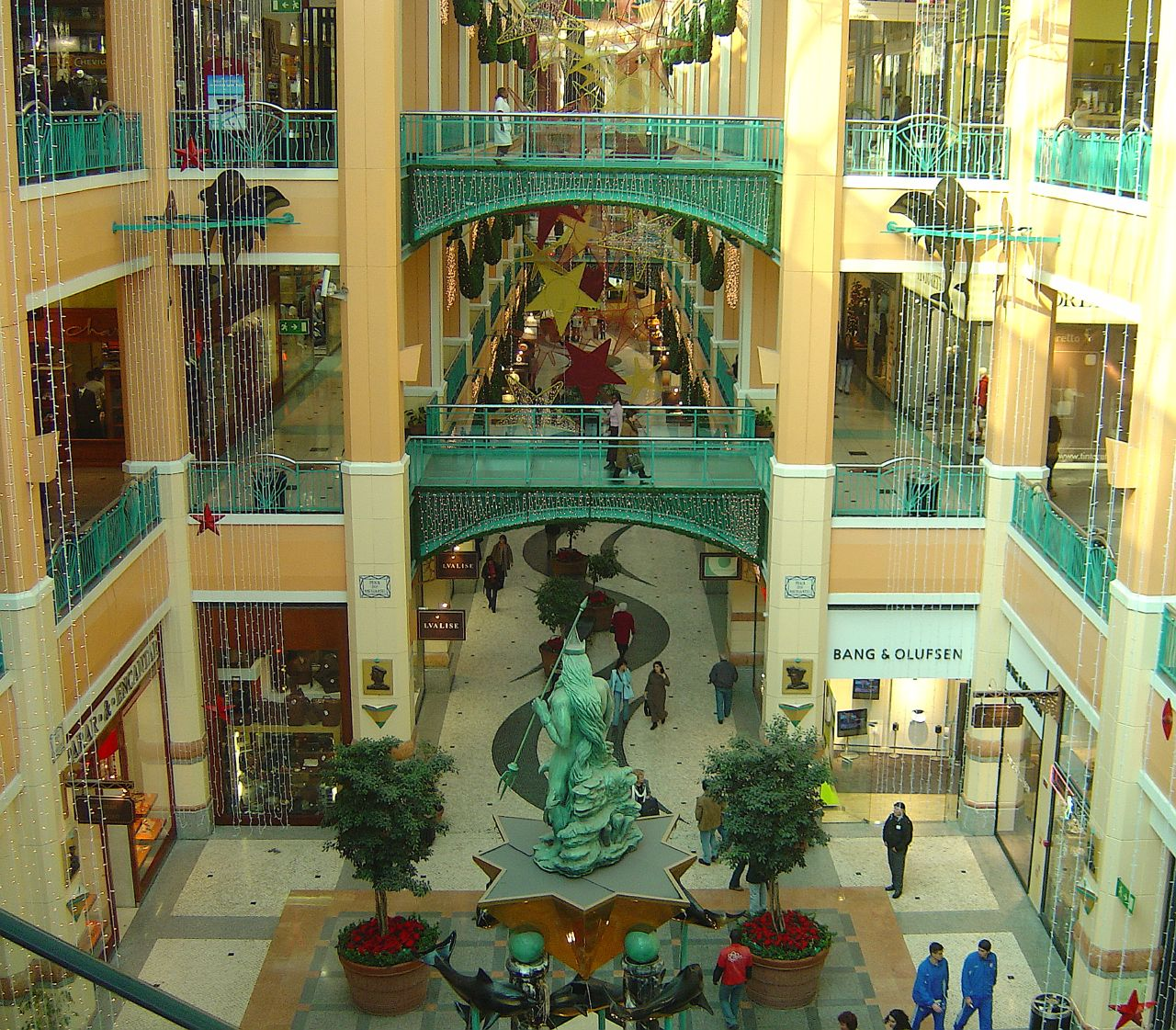
View from the top floor - note the maritime artwork.

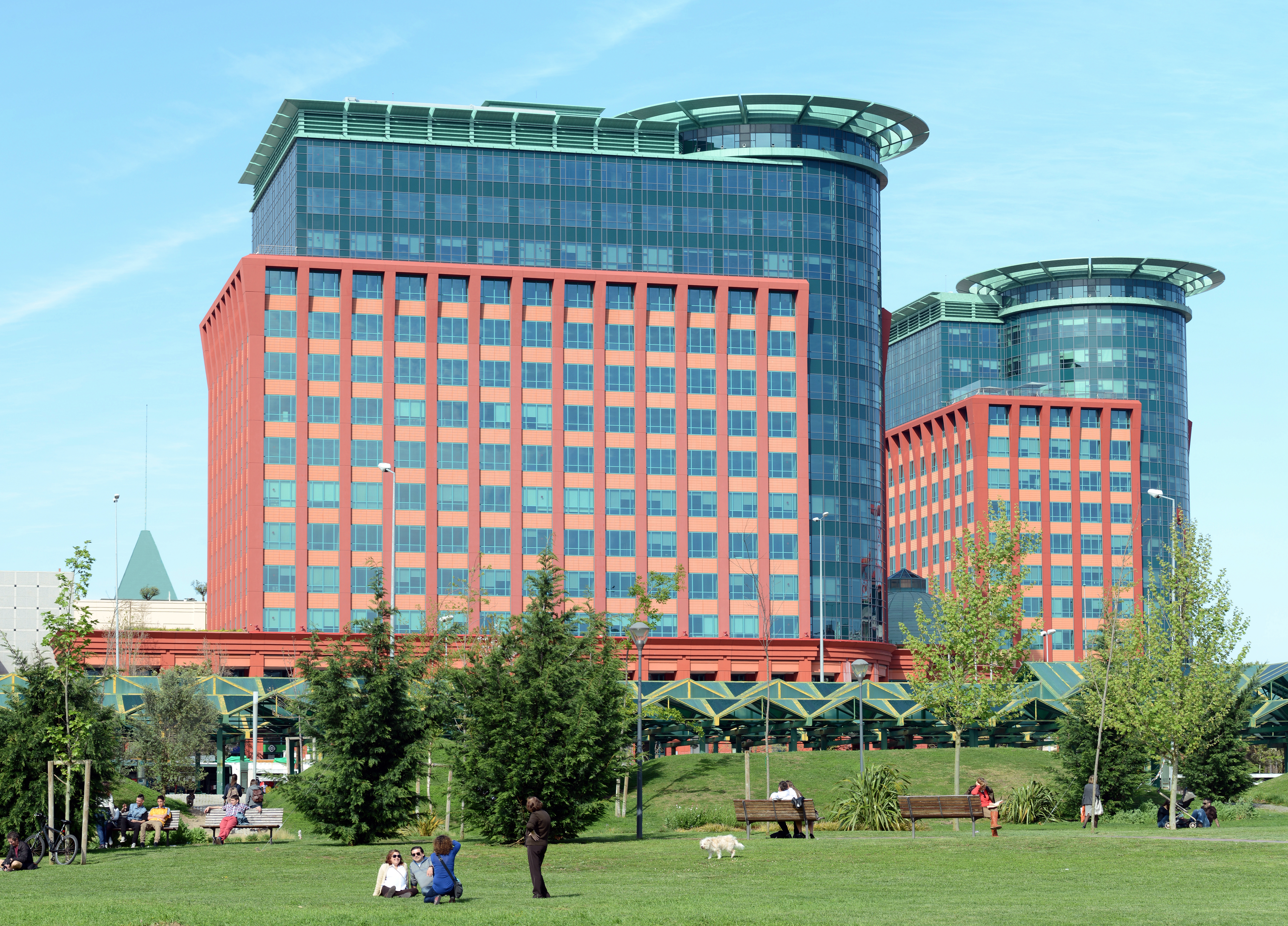

The Colombo Centre (Portuguese: Centro Colombo) is a shopping mall located in the parish of Carnide in Lisbon and attracts many visitors. It is situated next to the Lusíada avenue and the Segunda Circular; there is a bus terminal next to the building and the Lisbon Metro station Colégio Militar/Luz allows visitors easy access to Colombo.

== Etymology ==
The name Colombo was suggested in the late 80s when it was in the planning stages. It was expected to open in 1992, coinciding with the 500th anniversary of Christopher Columbus' voyage to the Americas. At the time, there was a theory that suggested that Columbus was Portuguese. The choice of the name was also pivotal for its architecture.

== History ==
It was conceived by architect José Quintela, who also worked for other Sonae Sierra malls. The concept was presented to the public in 1994 while groundbreaking took place in 1995. It opened on 15 September 1997. Portugal's first Fnac opened there on 28 February 1998.

The architecture of the space, as well as its original decoration, was themed to the Age of Discovery, one of the most important periods in the history of Portugal. The squares and hallways inside the mall have names alluding to the Elizabethan era, such as "Avenue of the Discoveries" and "Tropic of Cancer Square". From 2007 and 2009, the mall renovated its interior design completely, mixing contemporary concepts with the originals.

This mall has been designed with environmental concerns in mind, therefore it has implemented several policies towards energy saving, waste recycling and others.

== Shops ==
It has shoe shining, clothing stores, food stores, stationery stores, a chapel, and a supermarket. Additionally there are 9 cinema screens, a bowling alley, an outdoor garden and over 60 restaurants. It is the biggest shopping mall of the Iberian Peninsula by total number of stores. It has more stores than any other shopping mall in Portugal, having stores such as Fnac, Zara, Sport Zone, Adidas Originals and the largest Primark store in Portugal.

The mall has 119 725 m^{2} and 340 stores.

The Towers of Colombo, which were seen in the initial project as an integral part of the Centro Colombo, were only started in 2007 due to an embargo by the Lisbon city council, which was ultimately decided in court. "Torre Oriente" (East Tower) was finished first and "Torre Ocidente" (West Tower) finished in 2011.
