= Martim Moniz Station =

Metro station in Lisbon, Portugal

Coordinates: 38.7168°N 9.1357°W

Martim Moniz
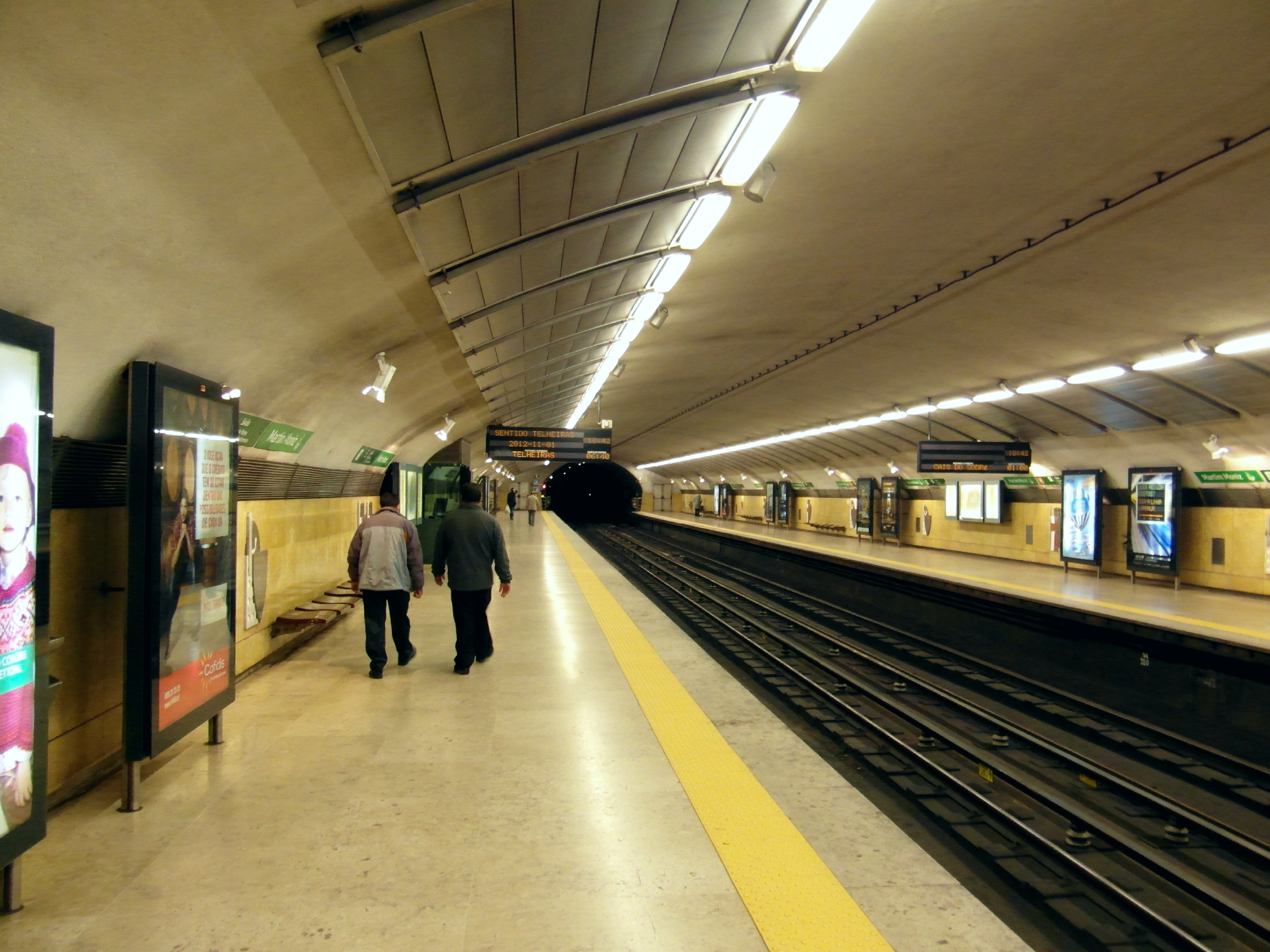

General information
- Location: Praça do Martim Moniz, Lisbon; Portugal
- Owner: Government-owned corporation
- Operator: Metropolitano de Lisboa, EPE
- Line: Green Line
- Platforms: 2 side platforms
- Tracks: 2

Construction
- Structure type: Underground
- Accessible: No
- Architect: Dinis Gomes

Other information
- Station code: MM
- Fare zone: L

History
- Opened: 26 September 1966 (59 years ago)

Services
Preceding station	Lisbon Metro	Following station
Intendente towards Telheiras	Green Line	Rossio towards Cais do Sodré
Route map
Location

Martim Moniz is a station on the Green Line of the Lisbon Metro. The station is located in the Martim Moniz Square.

== History ==
The station was designed by the architect Denis Gomes with art installations by the painter Maria Keil.

== Connections ==
=== Urban buses ===
==== Carris ====
- 12E Praça da Figueira - circulação
- 28E Martim Moniz ⇄ Campo de Ourique (Prazeres)
- 208 Cais do Sodré ⇄ Estação Oriente (Interface) (morning service)
- 708 Martim Moniz ⇄ Parque das Nações Norte
- 734 Martim Moniz ⇄ Santa Apolónia
- 760 Gomes Freire ⇄ Cemitério da Ajuda

==== Aerobus ====
- Linha 1 Aeroporto ⇄ Cais do Sodré

== See also ==
- List of Lisbon metro stations
