= Cidade Universitária Station (Lisbon Metro) =

Lisbon Metro Station

Cidade Universitária
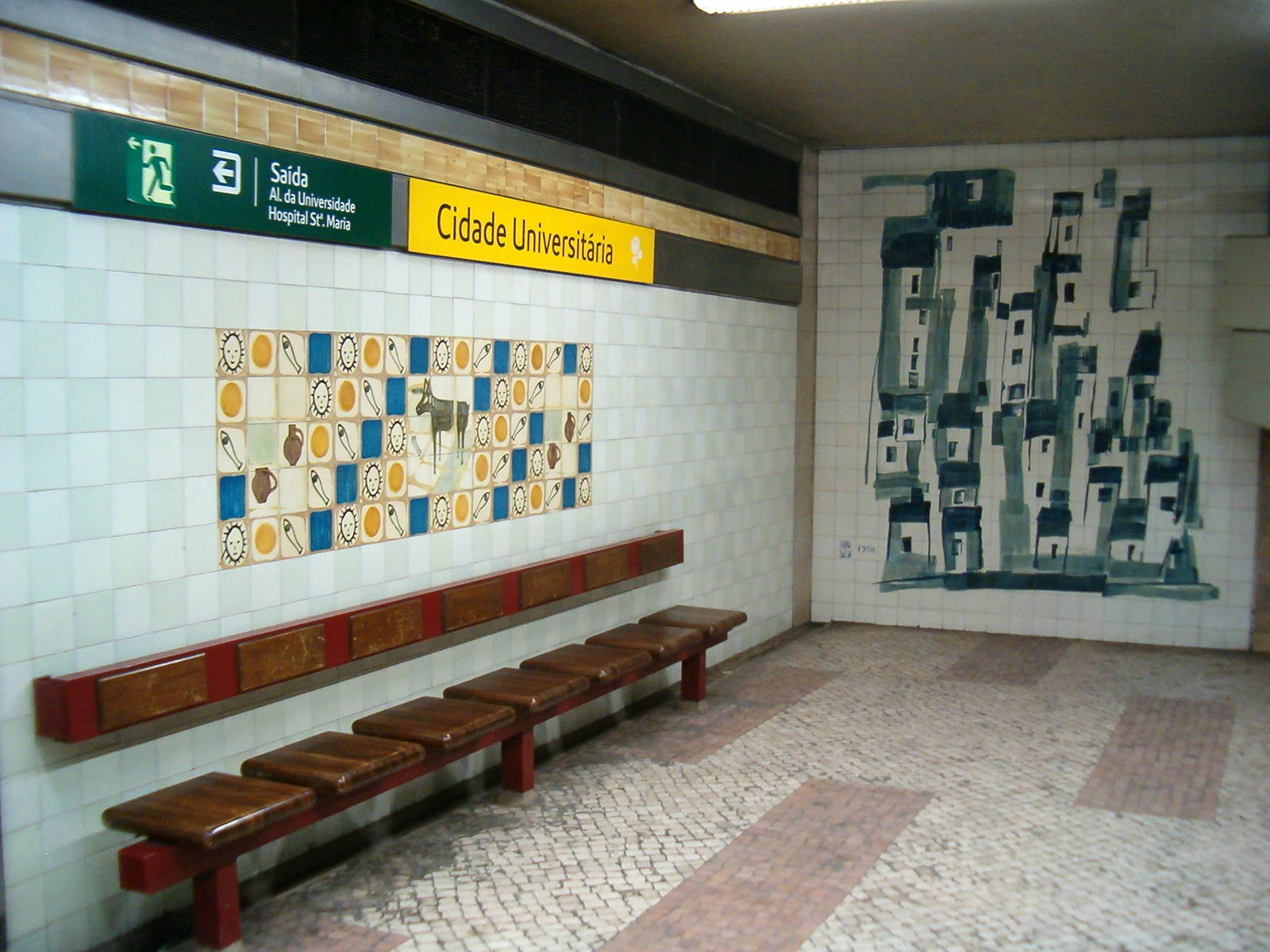

General information
- Location: Avenida Professor Gama Pinto, Lisbon; Portugal
- Coordinates: 38°45′6″N 9°9′32″W
- Owner: Government-owned corporation
- Operator: Metropolitano de Lisboa, EPE
- Line: Yellow Line
- Platforms: 2 side platforms
- Tracks: 2

Construction
- Structure type: Underground
- Accessible: Yes
- Architect: Sanchez Jorge

Other information
- Station code: CU
- Fare zone: L

History
- Opened: October 14, 1988 (37 years ago)

Services
Preceding station	Lisbon Metro	Following station
Campo Grande towards Odivelas	Yellow Line	Entre Campos towards Rato
Route map
Location

Cidade Universitária station is part of the Yellow Line of the Lisbon Metro.

== History ==
The station opened on October 14, 1988. It is located on Avenida Professor Gama Pinto. It serves the main campus of the University of Lisbon, hence its name.

The architectural design of the original station is by Sanchez.

== Connections ==
=== Urban buses ===
==== Carris ====
- 731 Av. José Malhoa ⇄ Moscavide Centro
- 735 Cais do Sodré ⇄ Hospital Santa Maria
- 738 Quinta dos Barros ⇄ Alto de Santo Amaro
- 755 Poço do Bispo ⇄ Sete Rios
- 764 Cidade Universitária ⇄ Damaia de Cima
- 768 Cidade Universitária ⇄ Quinta dos Alcoutins

==== Transportes Sul do Tejo ====
- 176 Almada (Praça S. J. Batista) ⇄ Lisboa (Cidade Universitária) (via Alcântara)

== See also ==
- List of Lisbon metro stations
