= Telheiras Station =

Metro station in Lisbon, Portugal

Telheiras
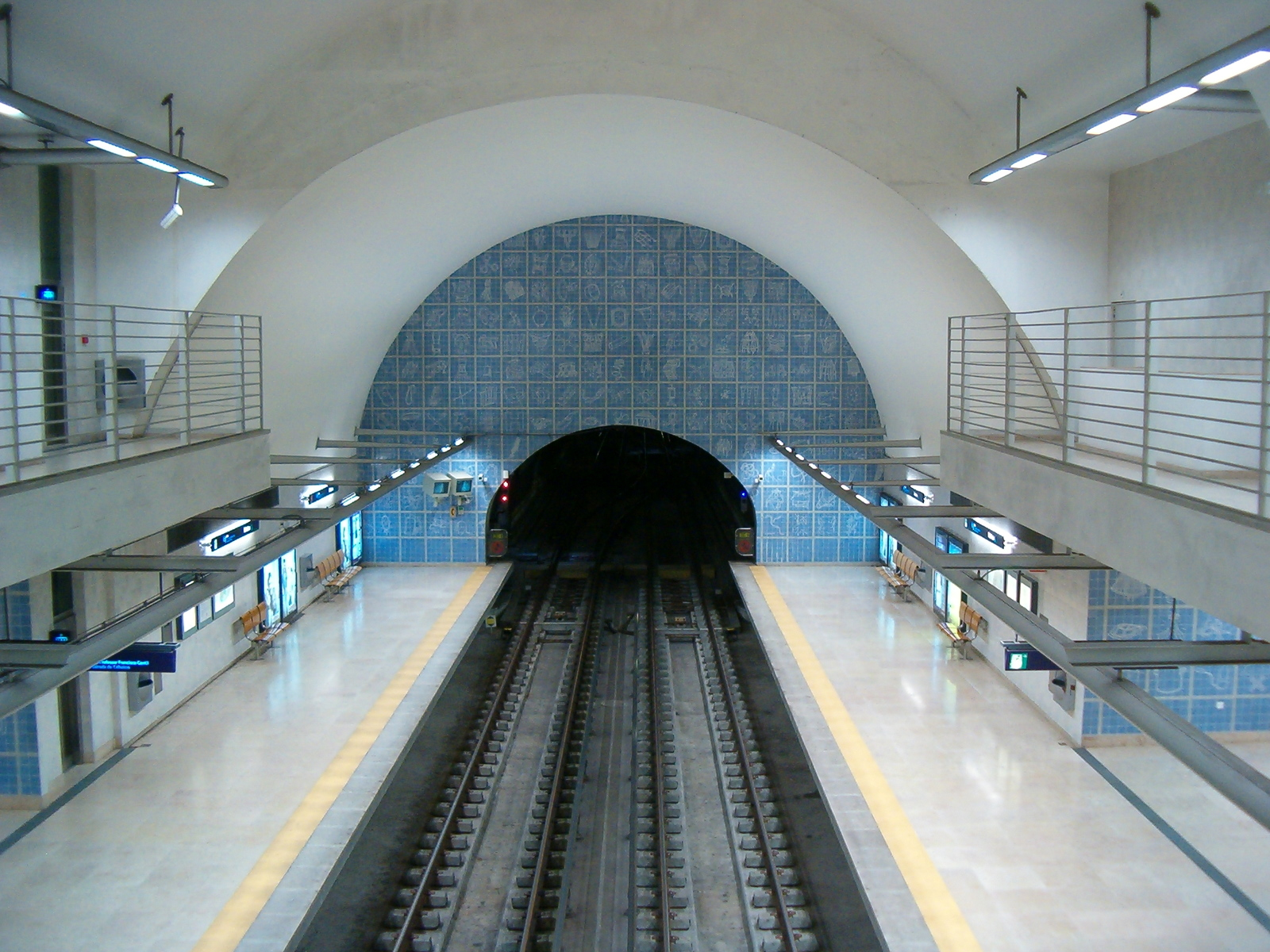

General information
- Location: Rua Prof. Francisco Gentil, Lisbon; Portugal
- Coordinates: 38°45′37″N 9°09′58″W
- Owner: Government-owned corporation
- Operator: Metropolitano de Lisboa, EPE
- Line: Green Line
- Platforms: 2 side platforms
- Tracks: 2

Construction
- Structure type: Underground
- Accessible: yes
- Architect: Duarte Nuno Simões

Other information
- Station code: TE
- Fare zone: L

History
- Opened: 2 November 2002 (23 years ago)

Services
Preceding station	Lisbon Metro	Following station
Terminus	Green Line	Campo Grande towards Cais do Sodré
Route map
Location

Telheiras station is the northern terminus on the Green Line of the Lisbon Metro. The station is located between Rua Prof. Francisco Gentil and Estrada de Telheiras, next to Azinhaga do Areeiro.

The architectural design of the station is by Duarte Nuno Simões and the art installations are by Eduardo Batarda.

== Connections ==
=== Urban buses ===
==== Carris ====
- 747 Campo Grande (Metro) ⇄ Pontinha (Metro)
- 767 Campo Mártires da Pátria ⇄ Reboleira (Metro)
- 778 Campo Grande (Metro) ⇄ Paço do Lumiar

== See also ==
- List of Lisbon metro stations
- Henrique Sotero
