= Maria Keil =

Portuguese artist (1914–2012)

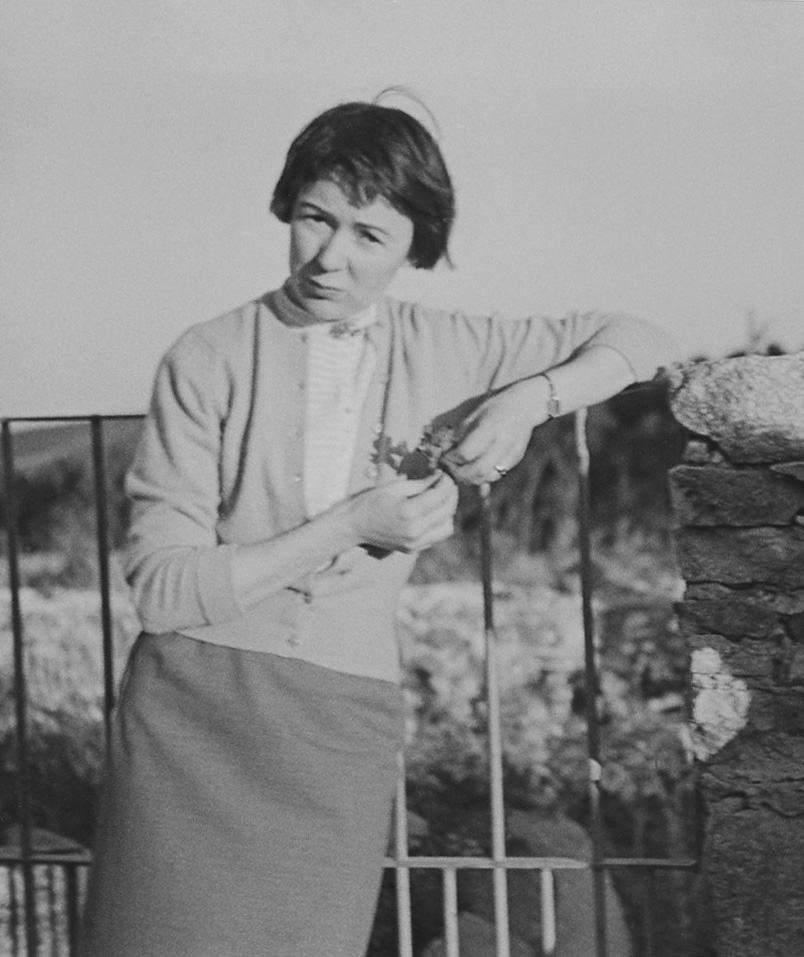
- Maria Keil in 1955
- Born: Maria Pires da Silva; 9 August 1914; Silves, Portugal
- Died: 10 June 2012 (aged 97); Lisbon, Portugal
- Known for: Painting, drawing, tapestry
- Movement: Modernism
- Spouse: Francisco Keil do Amaral (m. 1933; died 1975)
- Children: 1

Maria Keil (9 August 1914 – 10 June 2012) was a Portuguese visual artist. She was part of the second generation of Portuguese modernist painters and produced a vast body of diverse work that included painting, drawing and illustration, azulejo tiles, graphic and furniture design, tapestry and scenography. Particularly noteworthy was her activity as an illustrator, as well as the crucial role she played in the contemporary renewal of traditional tile art in Portugal.

== Early life and education ==
Maria Pires da Silva was born in Silves, in the Portuguese region of Algarve, daughter of Francisco da Silva Pires and Maria José Silva. From 1929 she attended the Preparatory Course at the Lisbon School of Fine Arts and then the painting course (which she did not complete), where she was a student of Veloso Salgado. Her art was characterized by the diversity of techniques and means of expression. Throughout her life she engaged in many areas, including painting and drawing, illustration, graphic arts, printmaking, tiles, tapestry, furniture, decoration, scenography and costumes.

In 1933 she married the architect Francisco Keil do Amaral and two years later her only son, Francisco Pires Keil do Amaral (or Pitum Keil do Amaral), was born.

== Career ==
In 1936 she became a member of the ETP (Technical Advertising Studio, then run by José Rocha), establishing friendship with Carlos Botelho, Fred Kradolfer, Ofélia Marques and Bernardo Marques. In the following year, she visited Paris during the construction of the Portuguese Pavilion of the Paris International Exhibition of 1937 (of which her husband was the architect). She made a piece for Room IV on the theme of Overseas (Salle IV - Outremer).

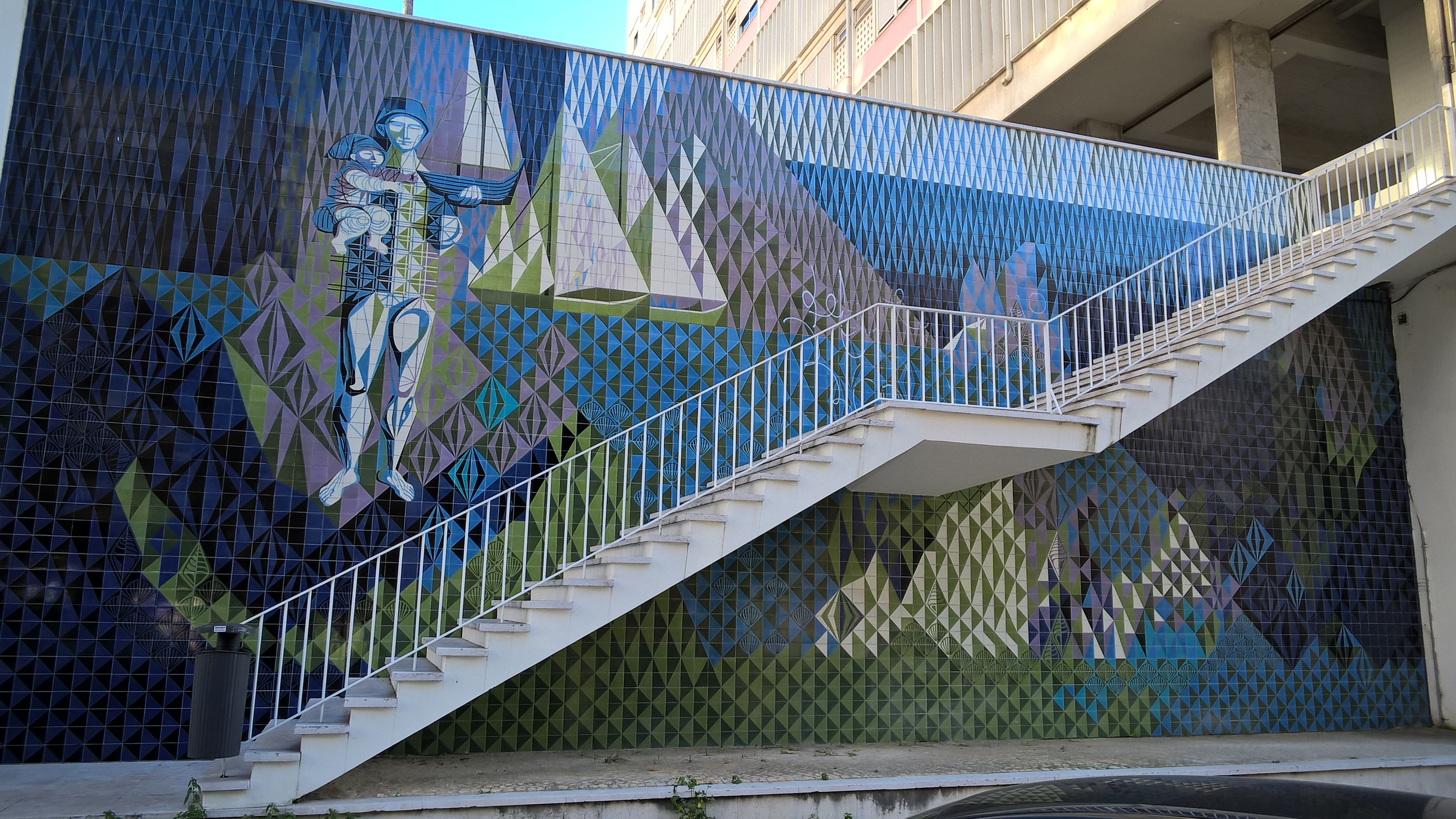
The Sea, 1958–59, azulejos panel, Av. Infante Santo, Lisbon

She exhibited individually for the first time in 1939 (as there were no art galleries, the exhibition took place at Galeria Larbom, a furniture store on Rua do Ouro, Lisbon). The same year she participated in the Secretariado da Propaganda Nacional (SPN) IV Modern Art Exhibition. She also participated in the SPN shows of the next two years, winning the Souza-Cardoso Revelation Prize in 1941 with Self Portrait, 1941.

In 1940, she designed sets and costumes for the ballet Lenda das Amendoeiras, presented at the debut show of the Verde Gaio Ballet Company.

Between 1946 and 1956 she regularly participated in the exhibitions of the Sociedade Nacional de Belas Artes (SNBA) in Lisbon. She held an individual exhibition in 1945 and, again, in 1955. "This was a historic exhibition, as it marked pioneering levels of innovation in the fields of furniture and, above all, tiles in Portuguese art". In this exhibition she highlighted the work of designing furniture for domestic interiors and for commercial spaces related to restaurants and hotels, to which she dedicated herself from the beginning of the 1940s until the middle of the following decade. There followed a long hiatus in which she dedicated herself to a wide range of activities, before she next exhibited solo in 1983.

Keil concentrated on book illustrations during this period. She wrote and illustrated books for both children and adults, with publications of her own text and images, or illustrating works by Matilde Rosa Araújo, Aquilino Ribeiro, Sophia de Mello Breyner Andresen, José Gomes Ferreira, Augusto Abelaira, Mário Dionísio, José Rodrigues Miguéis, Ilse Losa, among others.

Another key aspect of her work, where she came to distinguished herself, was the azulejo tile. She began to explore this ouvre in the early 1950s. Keil became one of the main figures in the modernising of this traditional art form. The tile panel O mar, on Avenida Infante Santo, Lisbon, and the extensive collaboration with the Metropolitano de Lisboa (Lisbon Metro) is a highlight of her significant body of work in this genre. Beginning in 1957, her work in the field would continue until c. 1972, with the decoration of the last stations of the first phase of the metro: Arroios, Alameda, Areeiro, Roma and Alvalade. Keil created the panels for all the initial stations with the exception of Avenida. From 1977, some of these panels were totally or partially destroyed, due to the expansion of several stations, including Saldanha, Restauradores and Intendente. In 1978 she participated in the travelling exhibition 5 Centuries of Tiles in Portugal (Rio de Janeiro, São Paulo, Brasília and Caracas). From then on, her work became a part of the main exhibitions (in Portugal and abroad) dedicated to the art of tiles in Portugal. In 1989, the Museu Nacional do Azulejo organized a comprehensive exhibition on this aspect of her work.

On 9 April 1981, she was awarded the rank of Commander of the Military Order of Sant'Iago da Espada.

Maria Keil died in Lisbon on 10 June 2012, at the age of 97.

== Style and works ==
The initial stages of her work were closely linked to the graphic arts and her participation in the Technical Studio of Advertising (formed by José Rocha). It is there that she learnt the about renewing the art Portuguese tiles, initially inspired by the example of Fred Kradolfer.

Oscillating between the direct, simple and immediate image, and the fusion of spaces or even the subtle surrealization of the narrative, Maria Keil starts "from a real situation, […] takes from her only what already brings her a touch of unreality. Then, and based on that, she sketches figures of a new reality that is characteristic of her art." This desire for clarification is present in her self-portrait of 1941, dominated by the "architectural presence" of the figure, which functions as the axis of the composition, controlling and dominating "her own presence, through the discreet theatricality of small gestures".

Her first experiences in working with azulejo tiles dated back to 1954, working with the TAP Air Portugal delegation in Paris and the Aerogare de Luanda in Angola. Her choice of working with tiles stemmed from the support of the new generation of architects, including her husband, Keil do Amaral, but also had personal motivations. She commented that "after the second exhibition, I came to the conclusion that it was not worth continuing with painting, the world is full of good painting […]. Architecture is a very serious thing, I found it more useful to do things for architecture".

Her first major work in this field dates from 1958 to 1959 (with preparatory studies dating from 1956 to 1958) and is entitled O mar (The Sea). Blues and greens predominate with figurative allusions of the fisherman with his son, boats, shells with the entire panel dominated by geometric patterns. Critics considered that "her cultural reference is not located in the pictorial panels, historians or naturalists of erudite production, but in its determinant borders where the possibilities of geometry and colour are transmuted into rhythms".

For the vast work for the Metropolitano de Lisboa metro line (1957 – c. 1972), Keil opted for strictly abstract forms.

== Azulejos/Lisbon Metro ==
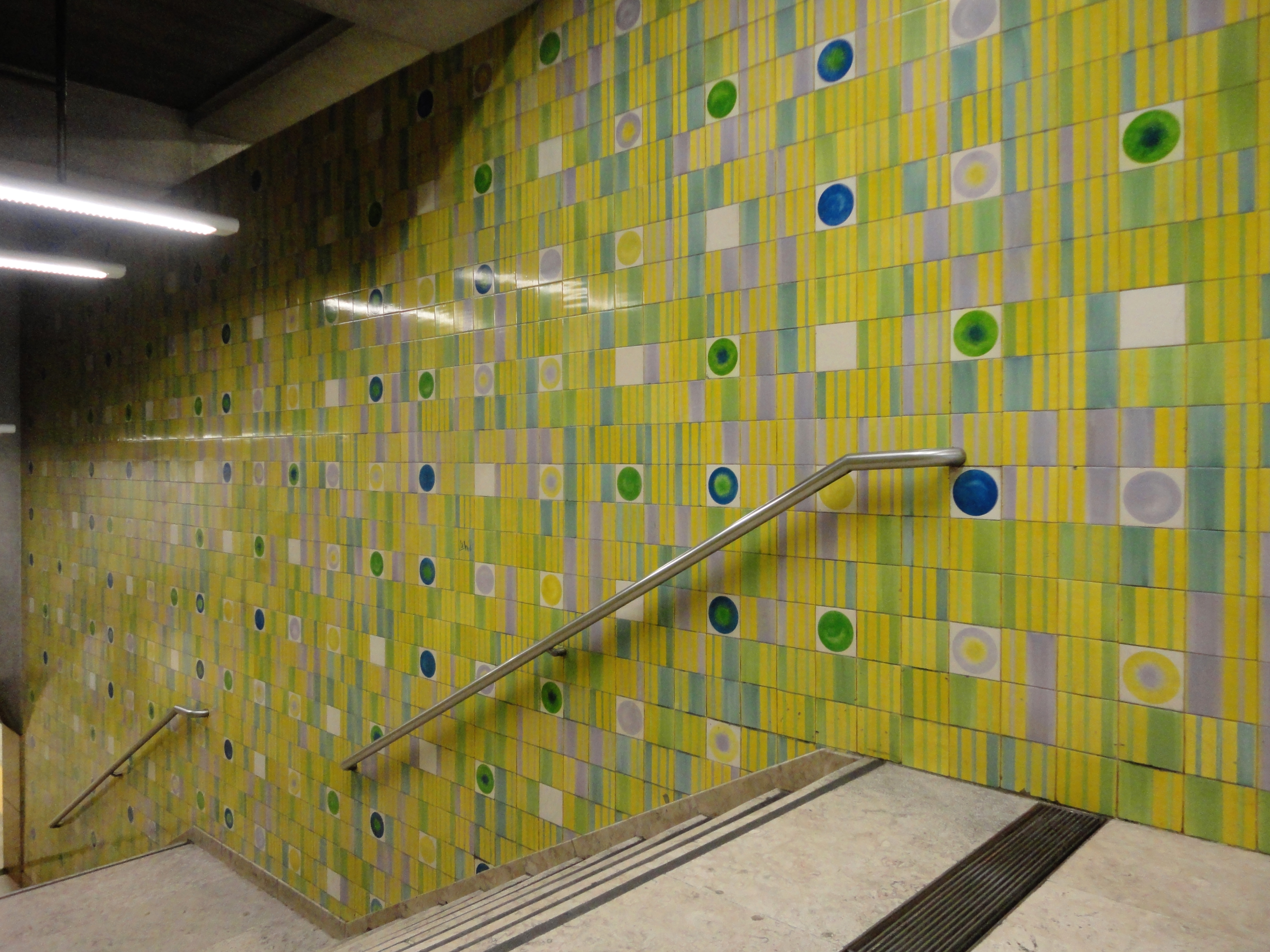
Martim Moniz (Lisbon Metro)

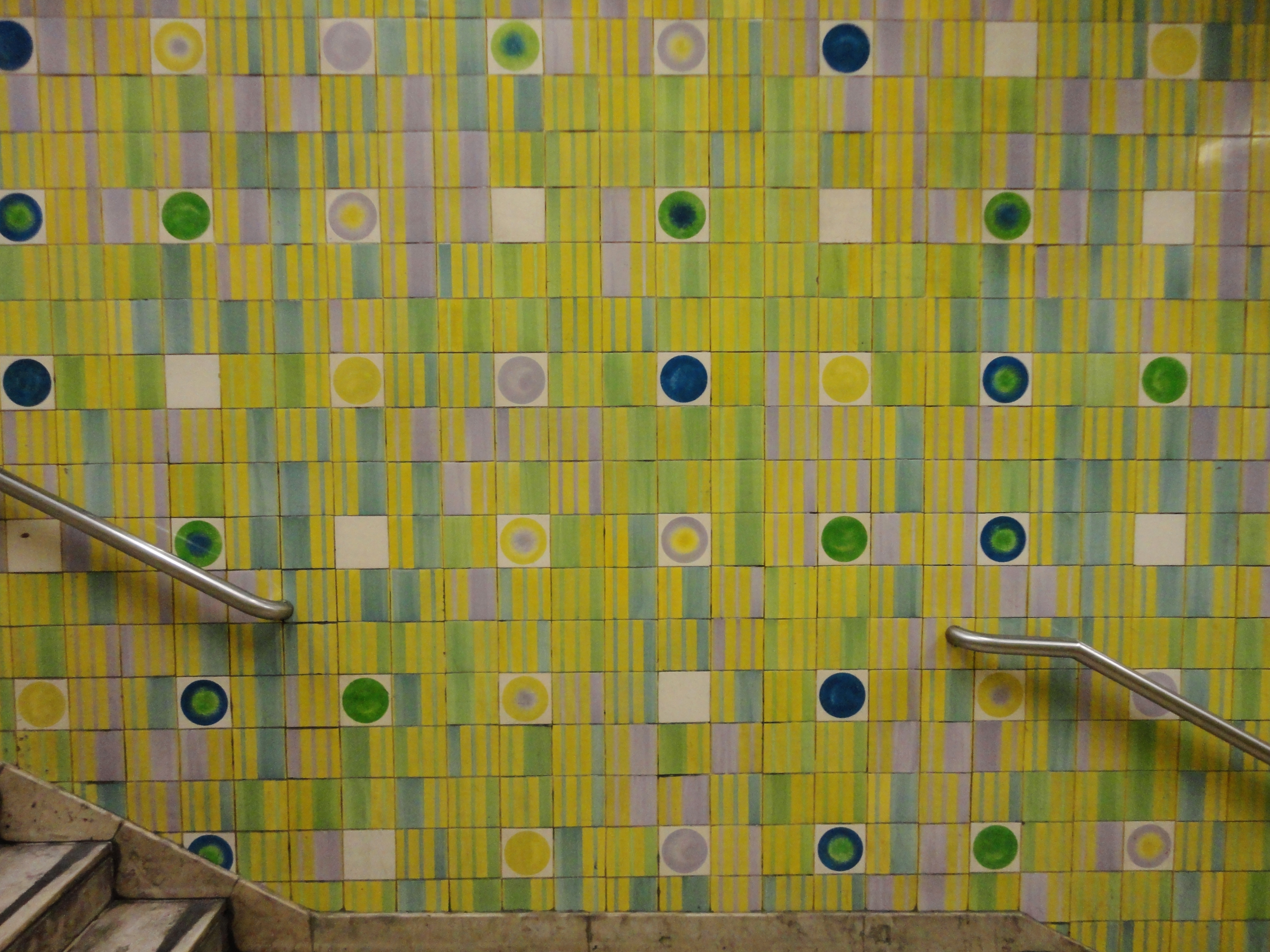
Martim Moniz (Lisbon Metro)

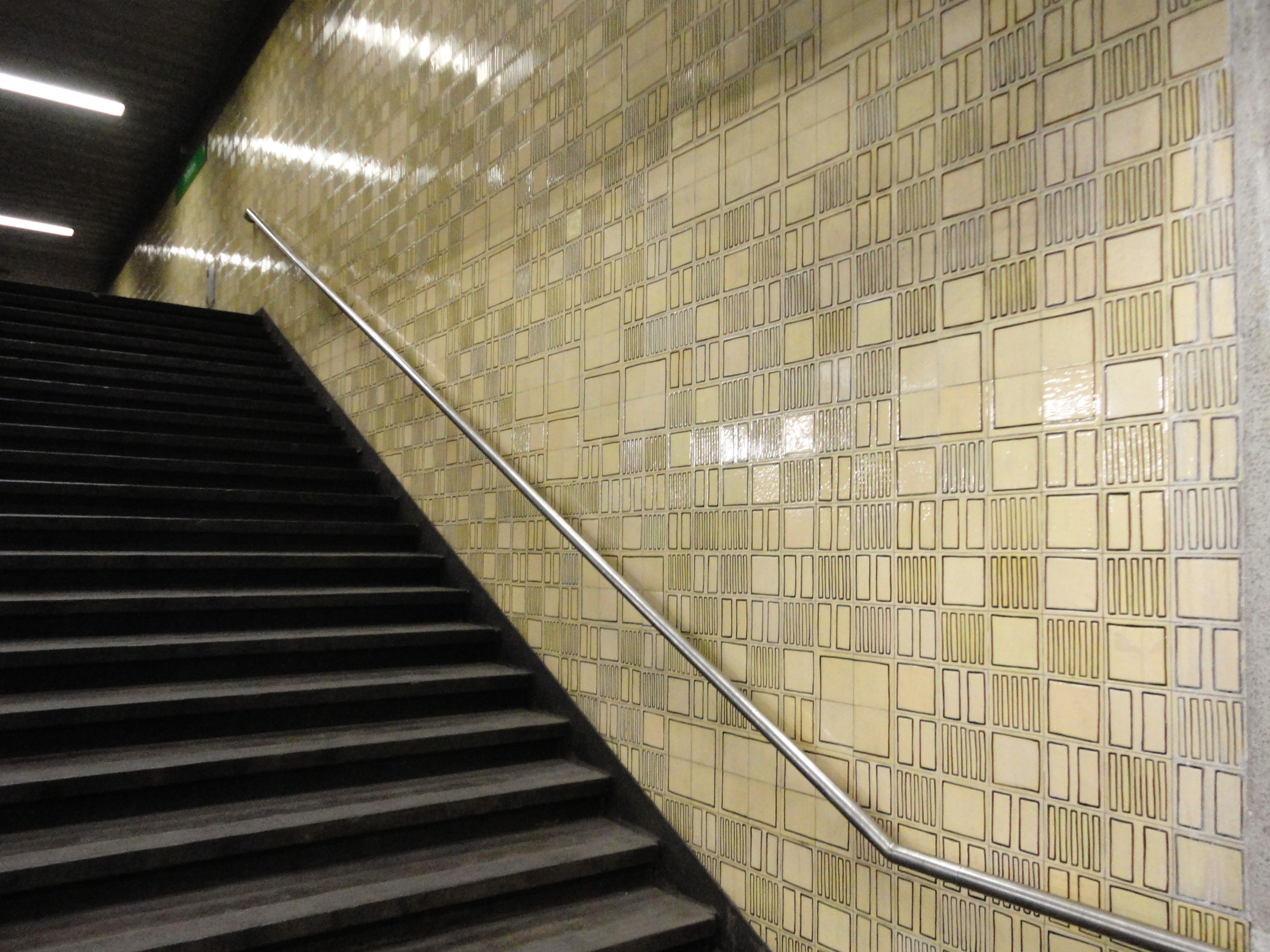
Intendente (Lisbon Metro)

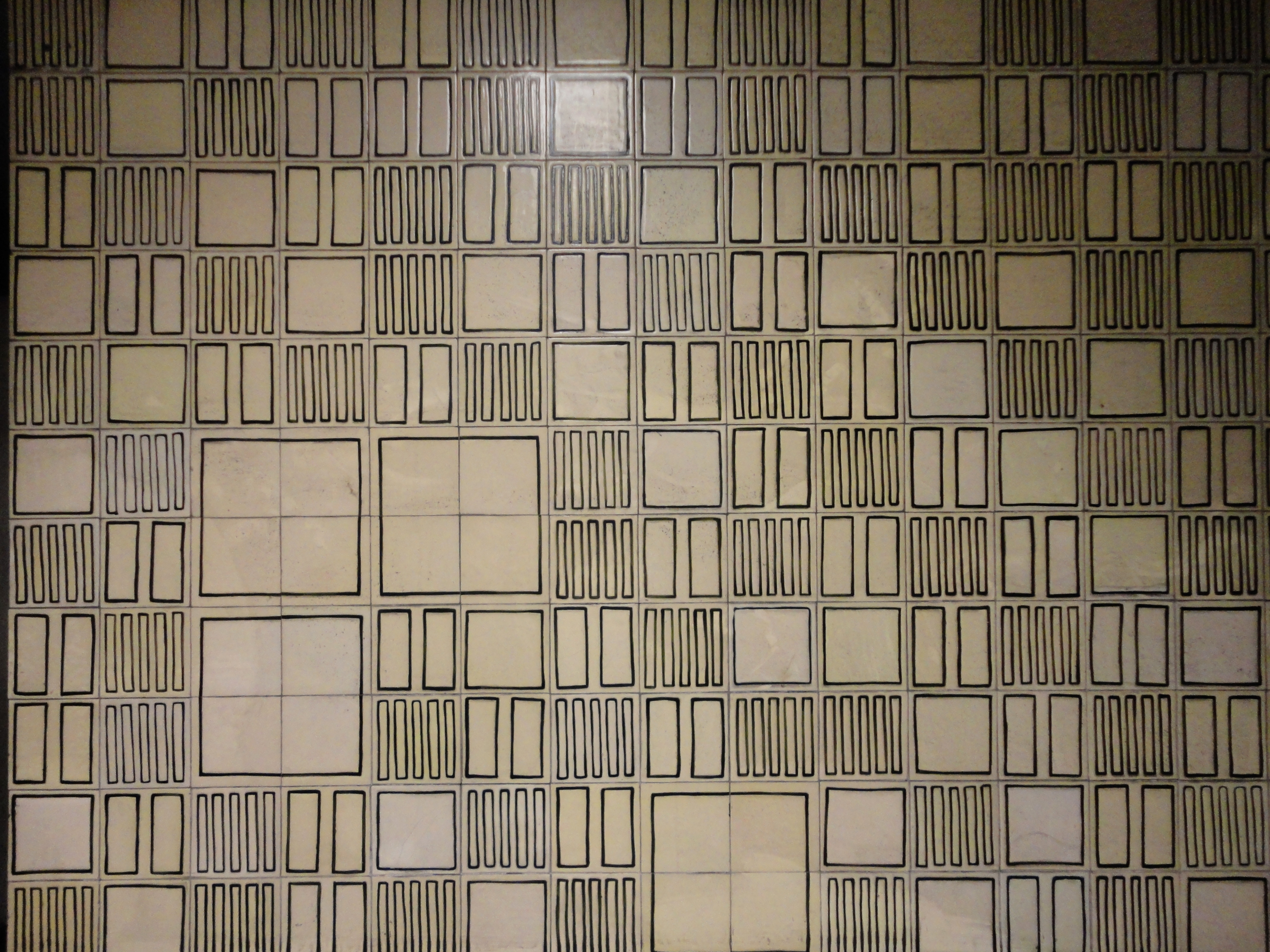
Intendente (Lisbon Metro)

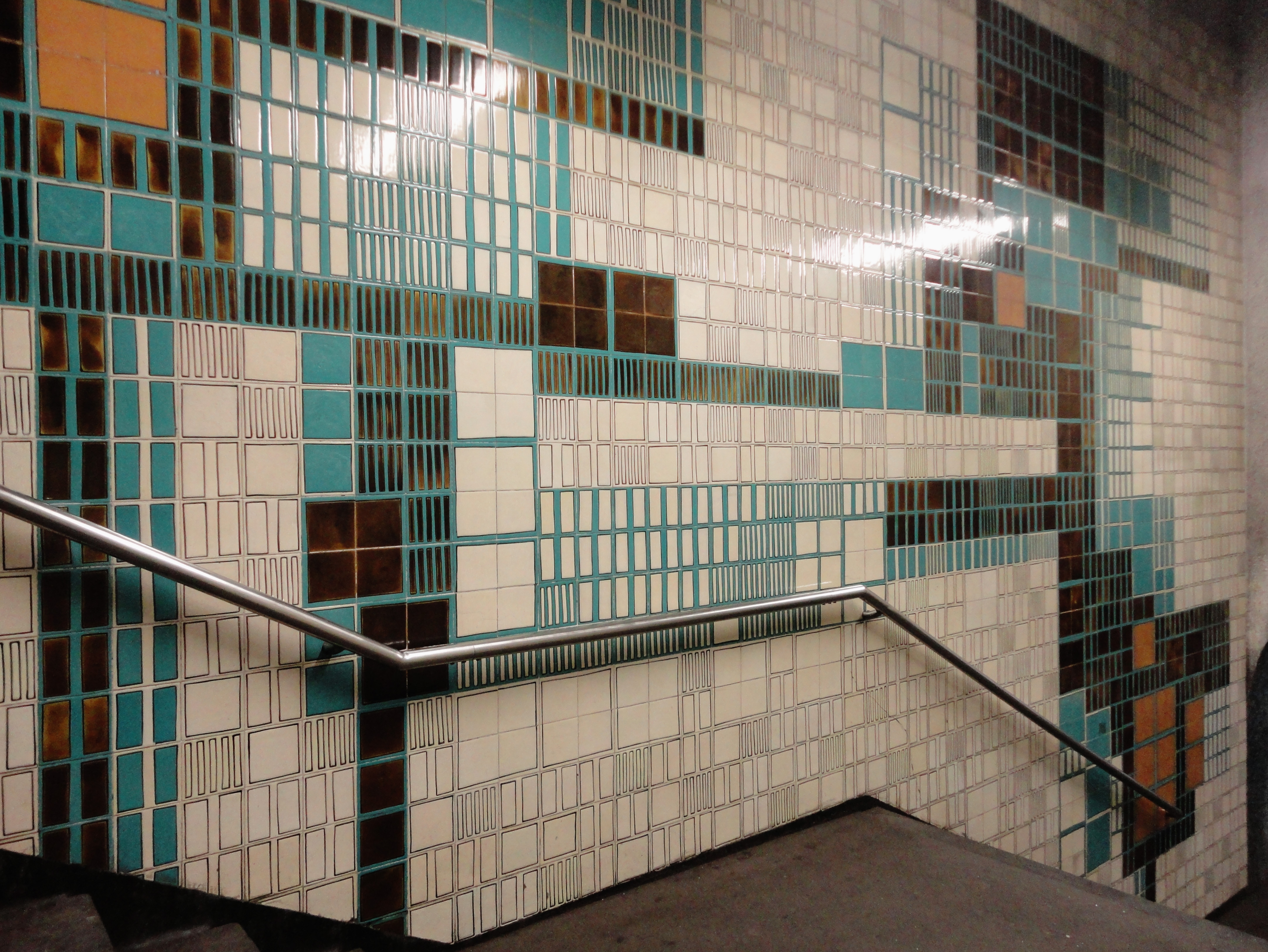
Intendente (Lisbon Metro)

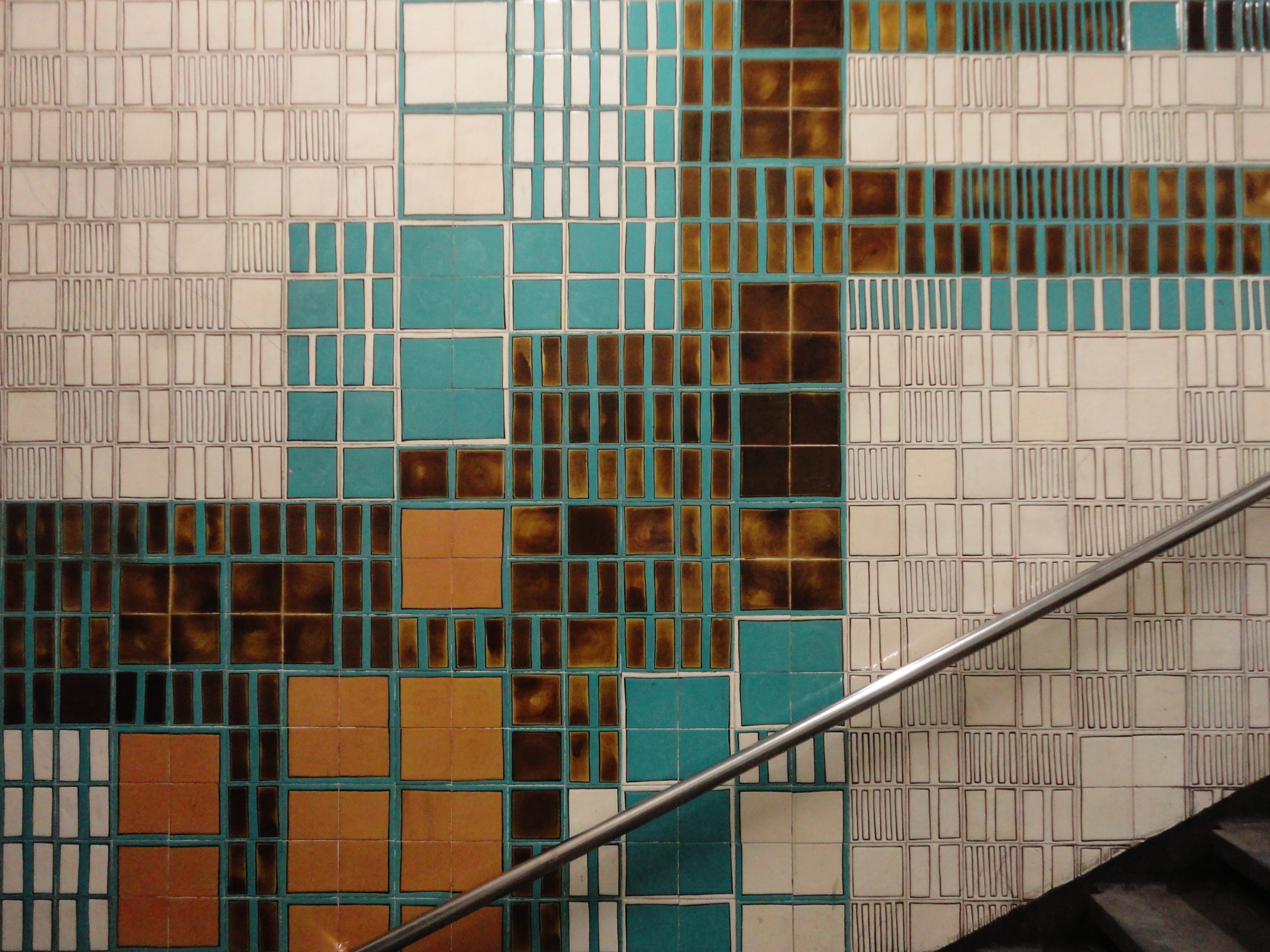
Intendente (Lisbon Metro)

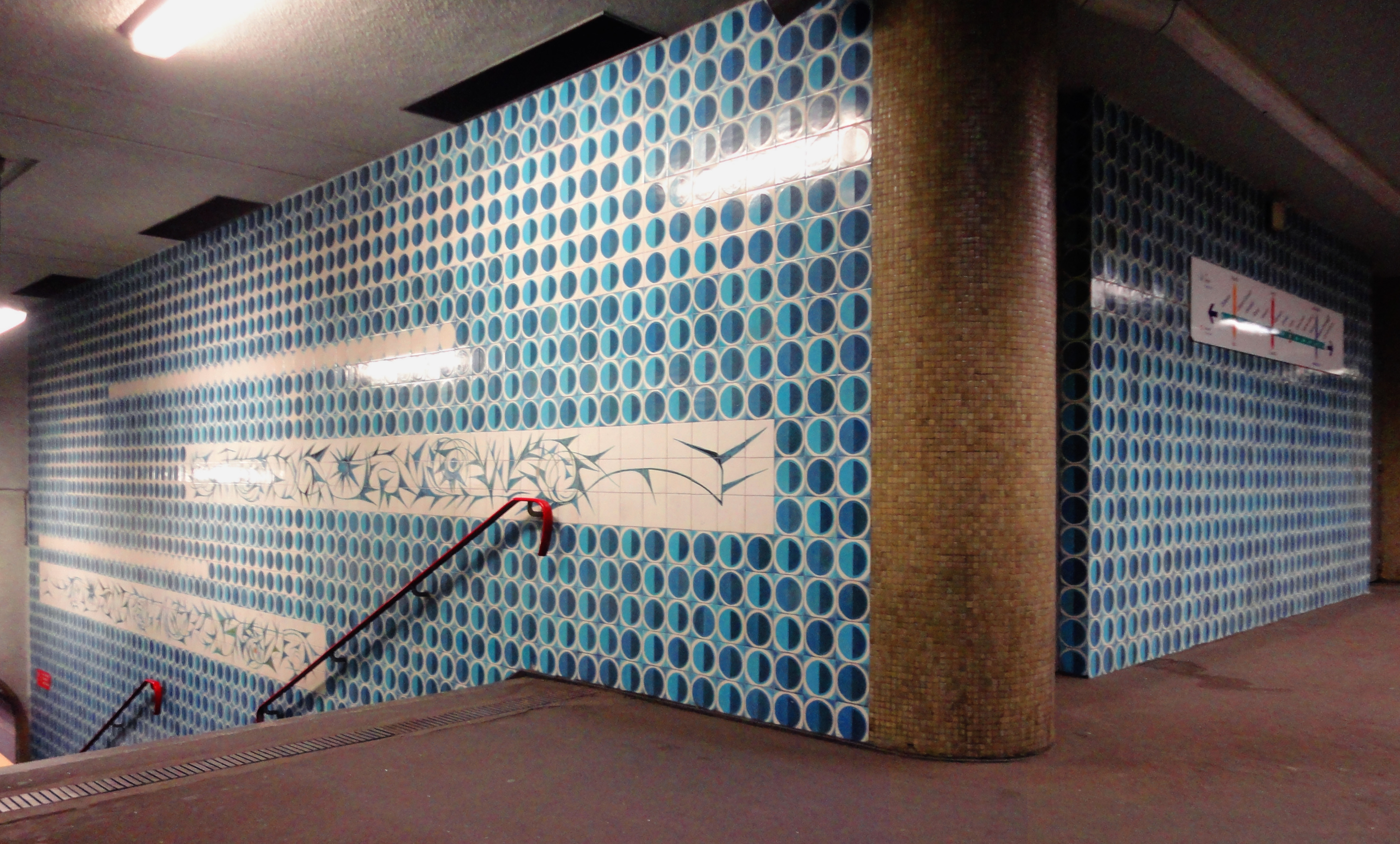
Anjos (Lisbon Metro)

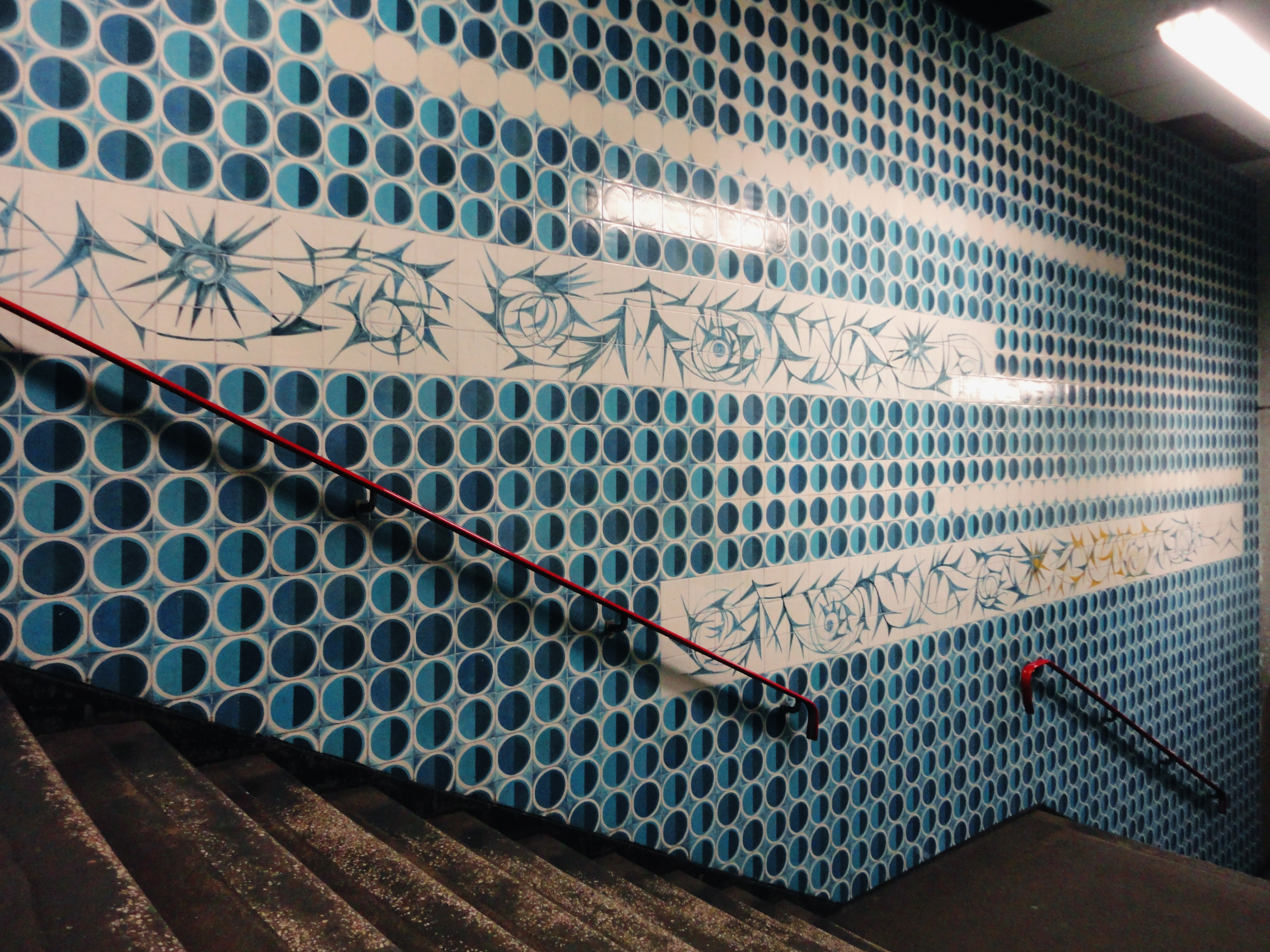
Anjos (Lisbon Metro)

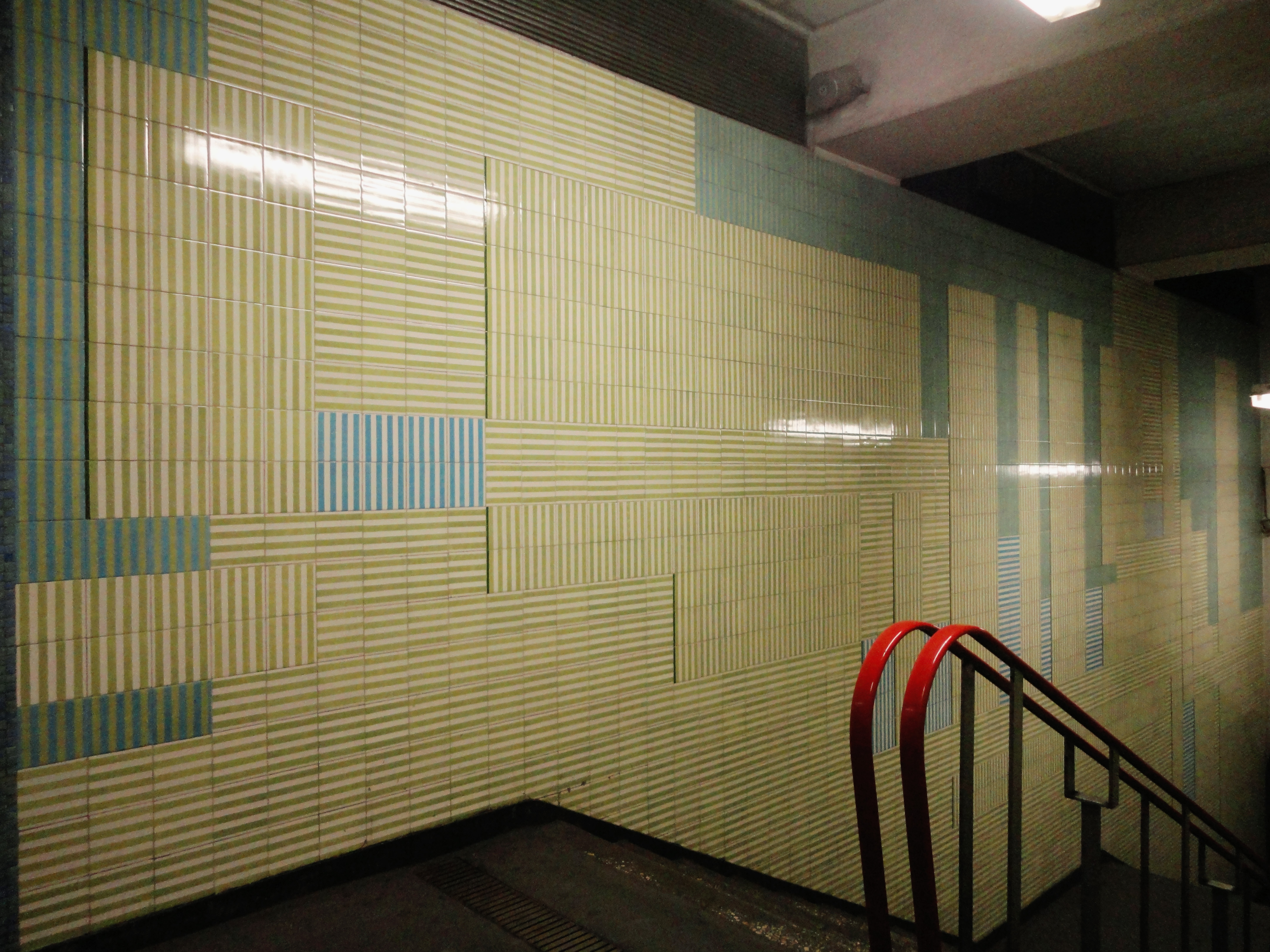
Arroios (Lisbon Metro)

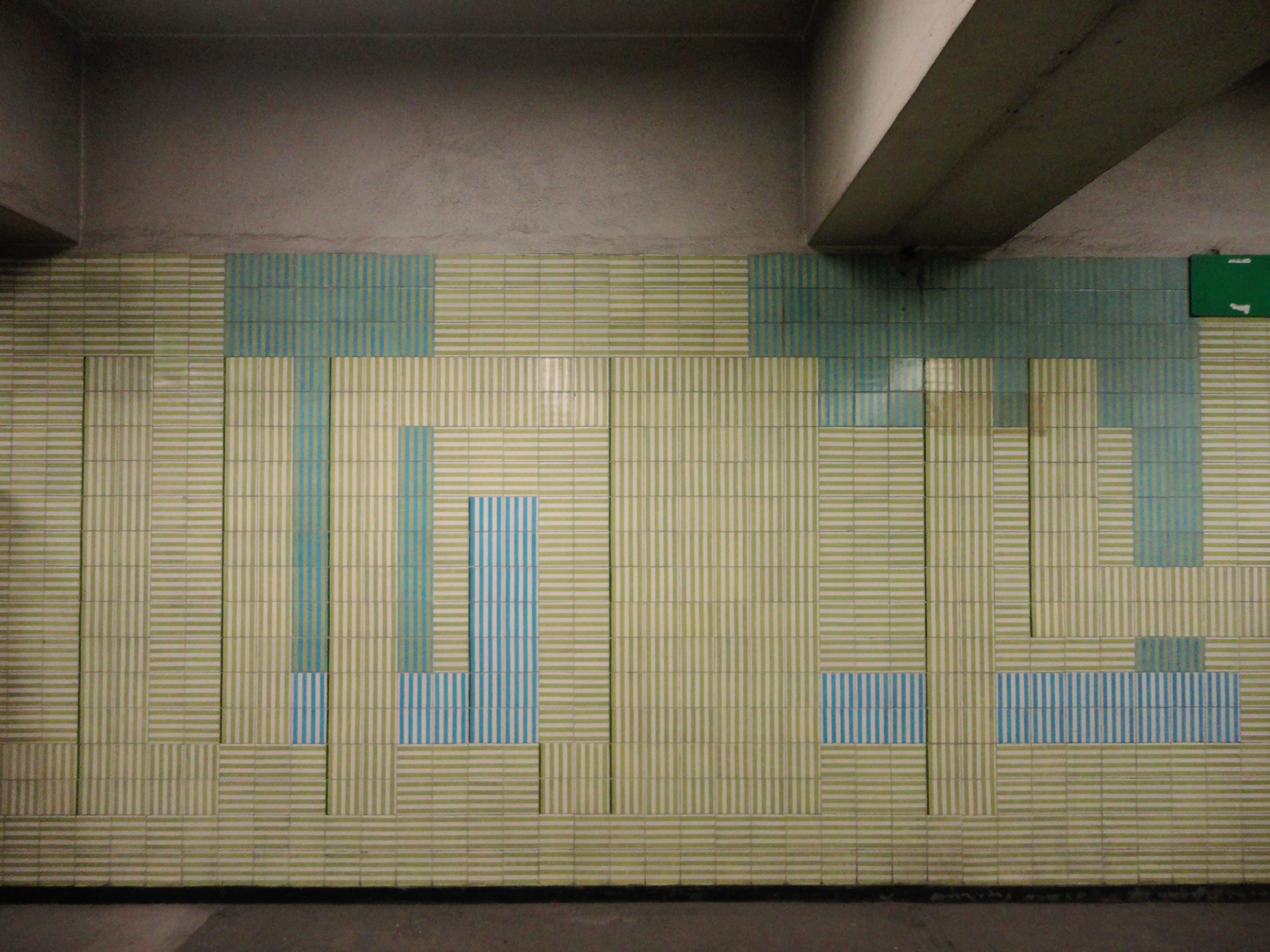
Arroios (Lisbon Metro)

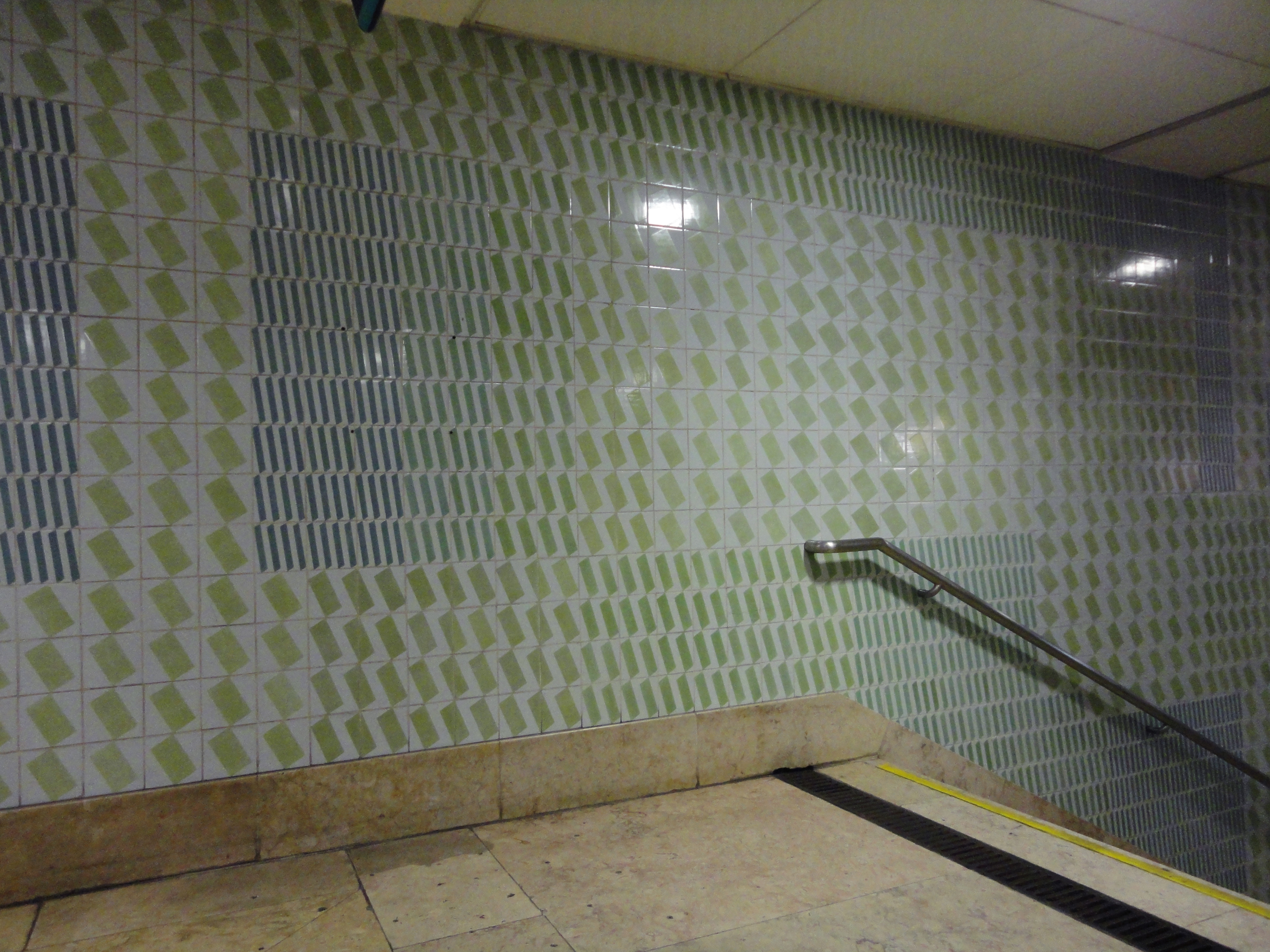
Alameda (Lisbon Metro)

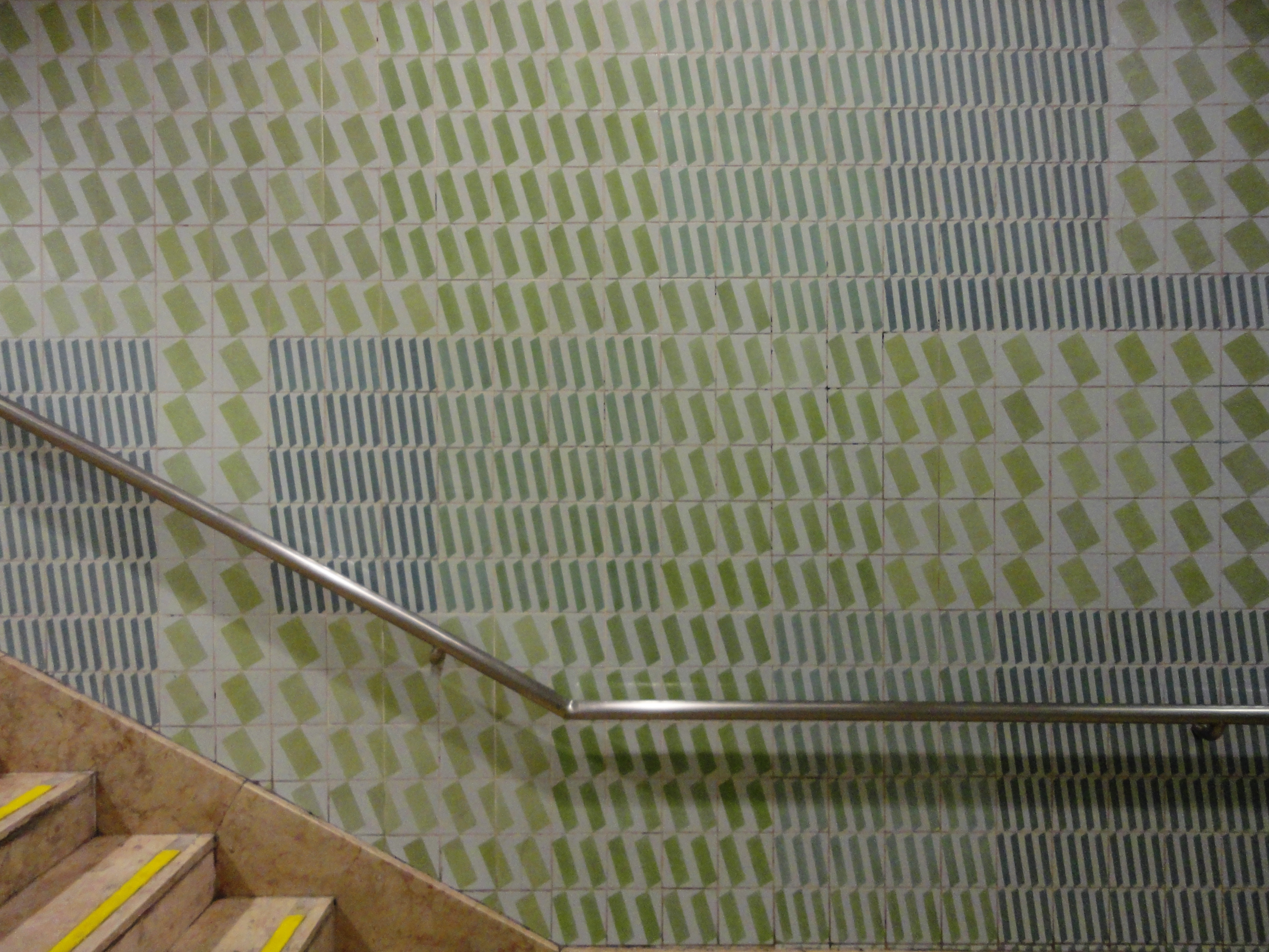
Alameda (Lisbon Metro)

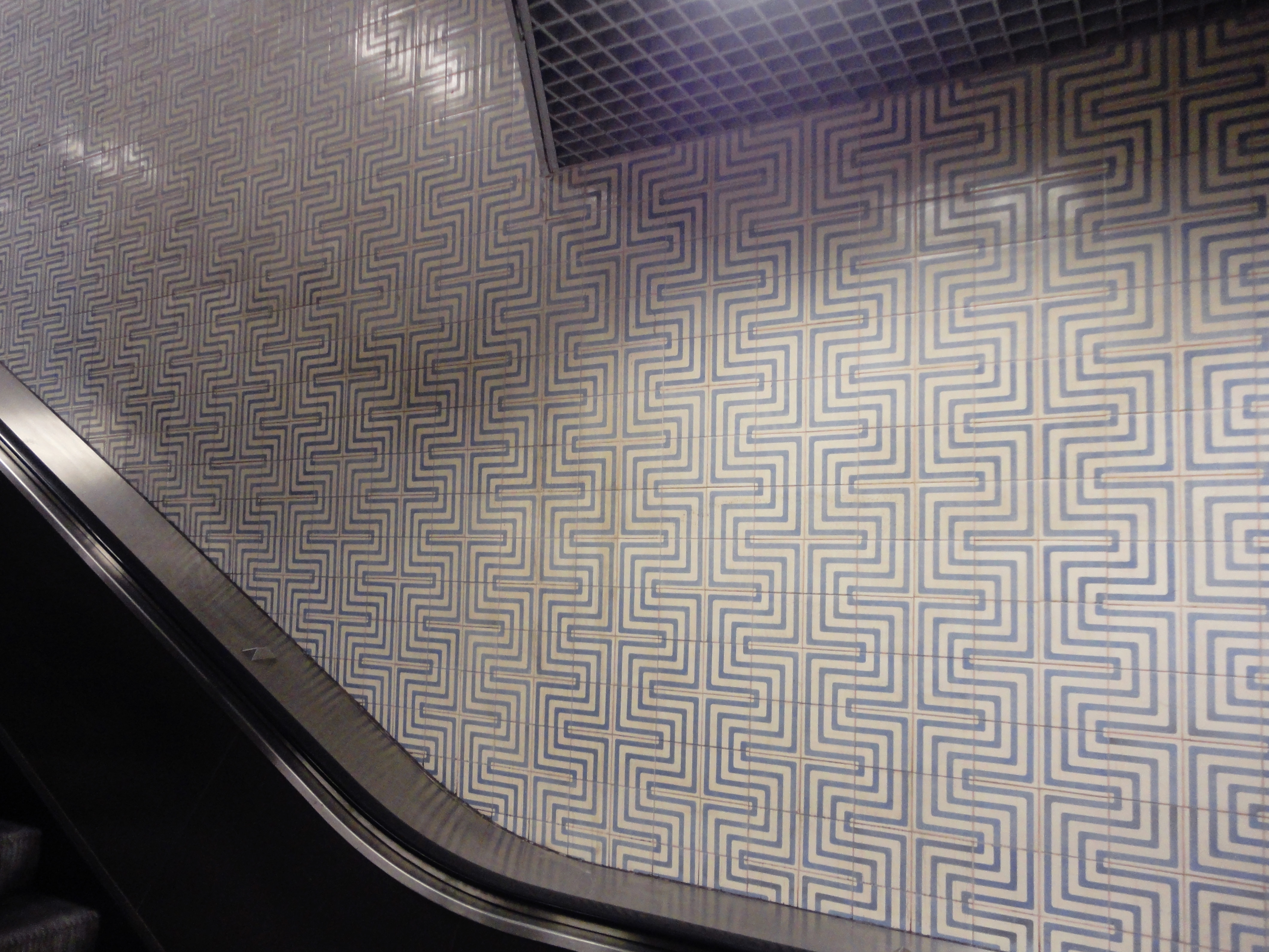
Restauradores (Lisbon Metro)

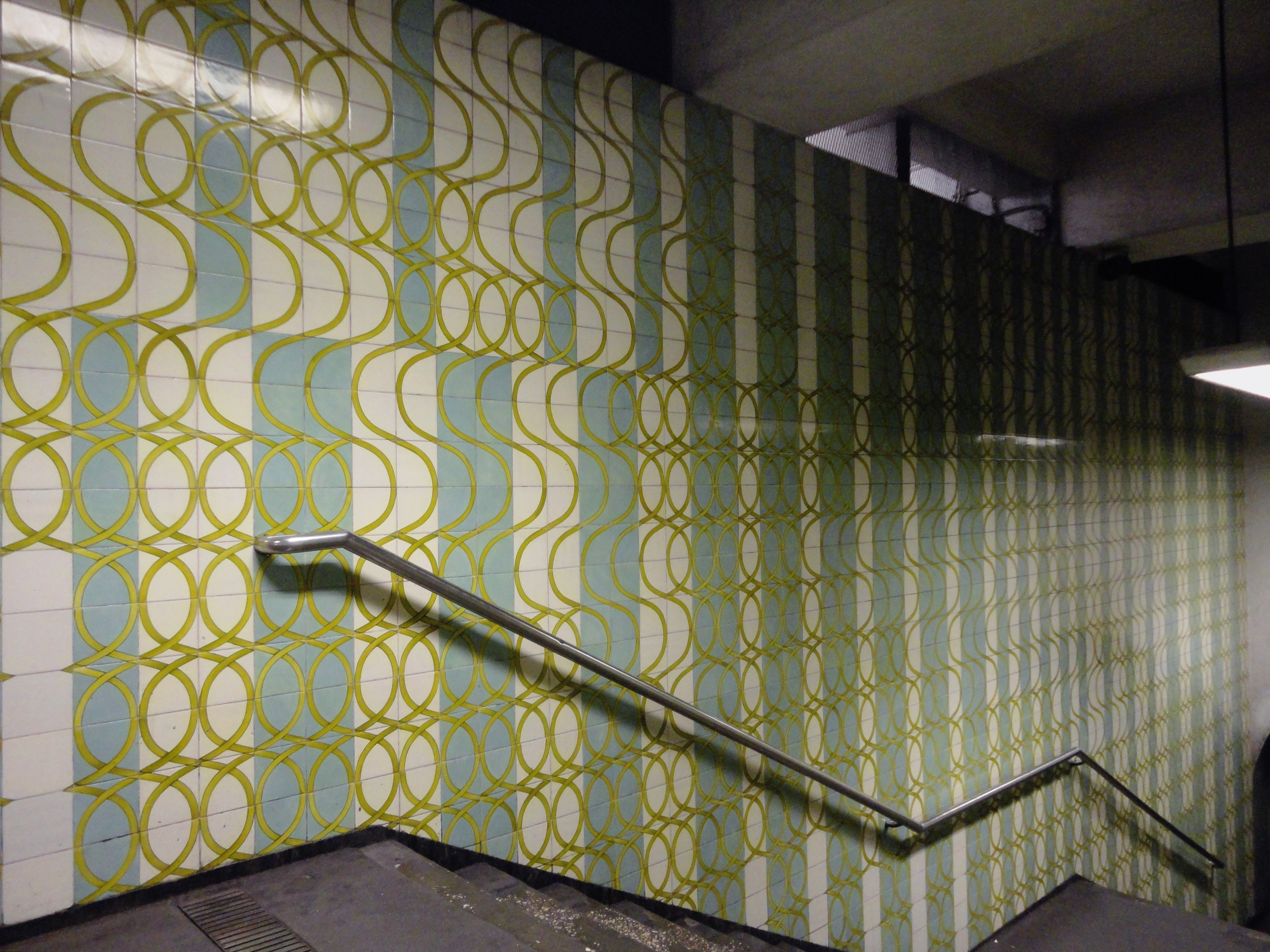
Areeiro (Lisbon Metro)

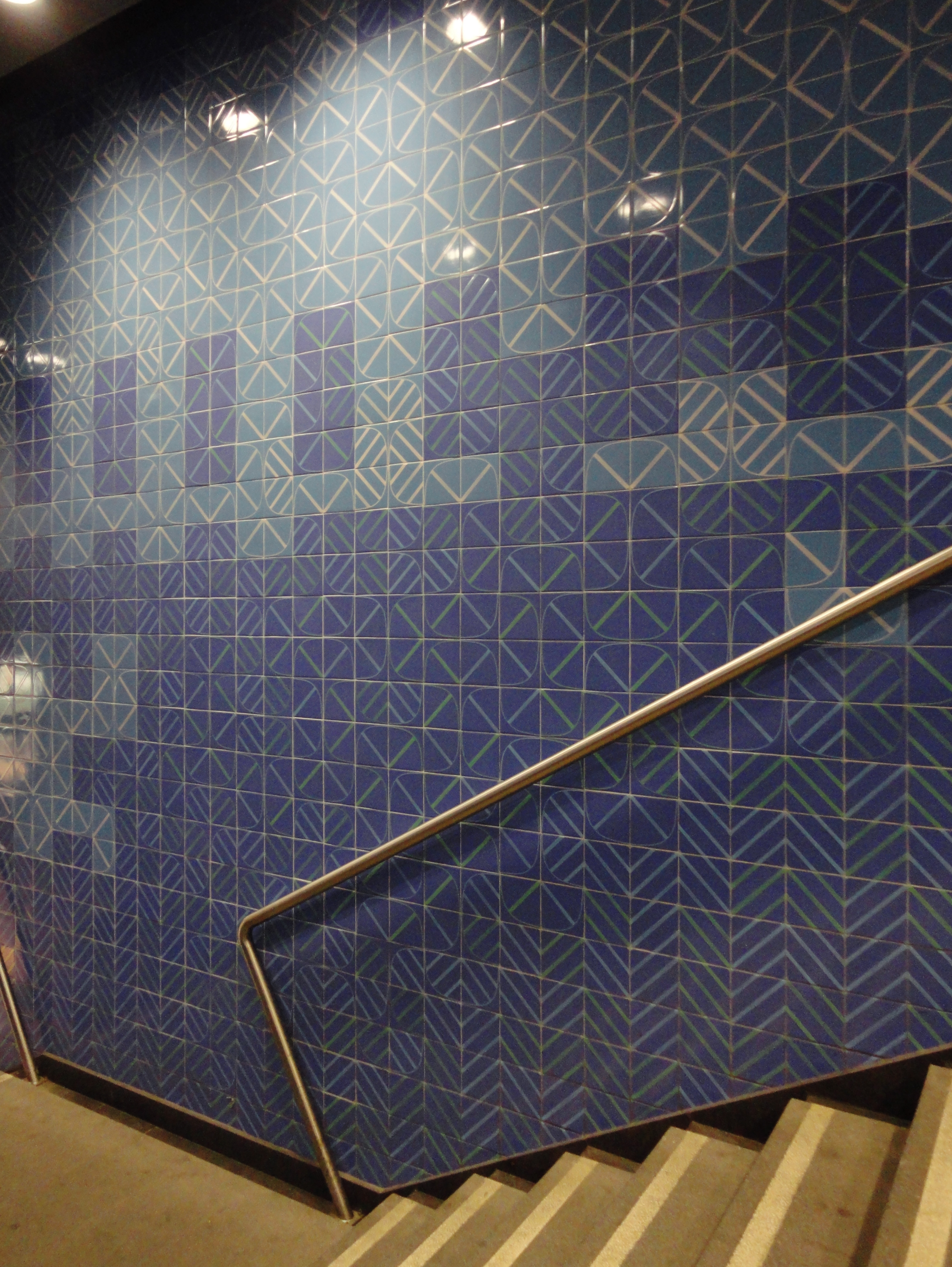
Roma (Lisbon Metro)

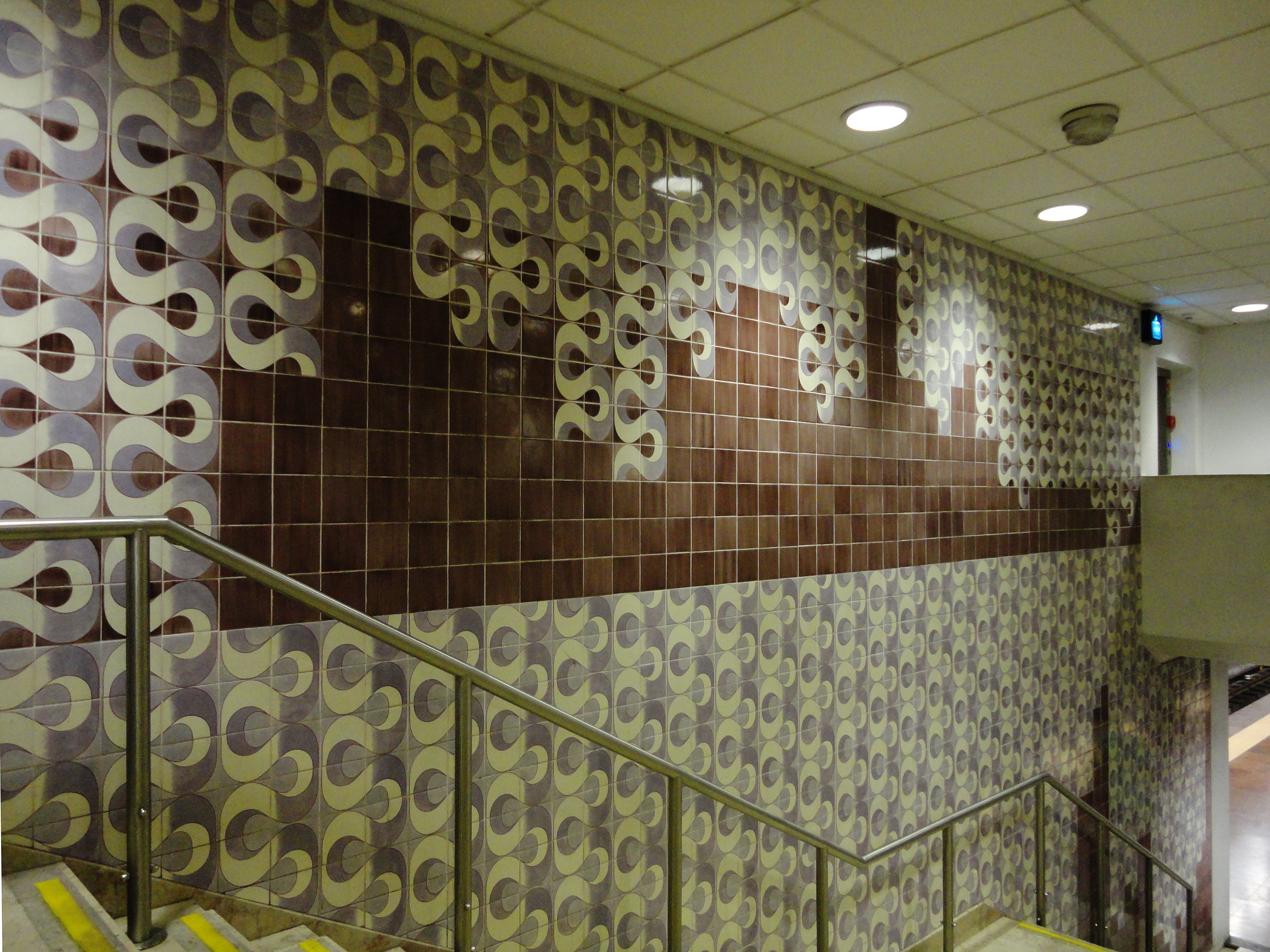
Alvalade (Lisbon Metro)

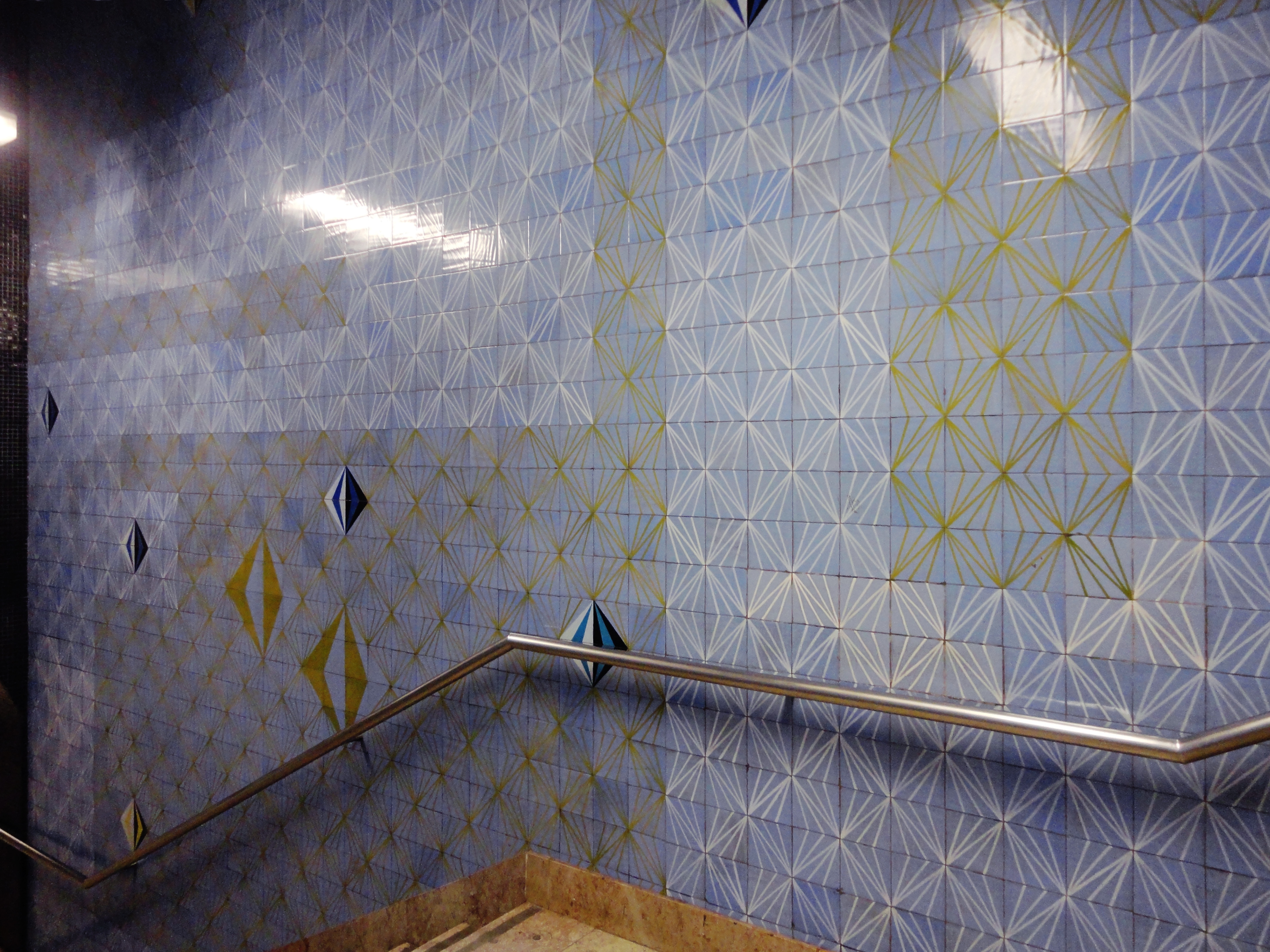
Campo Pequeno (Lisbon Metro)

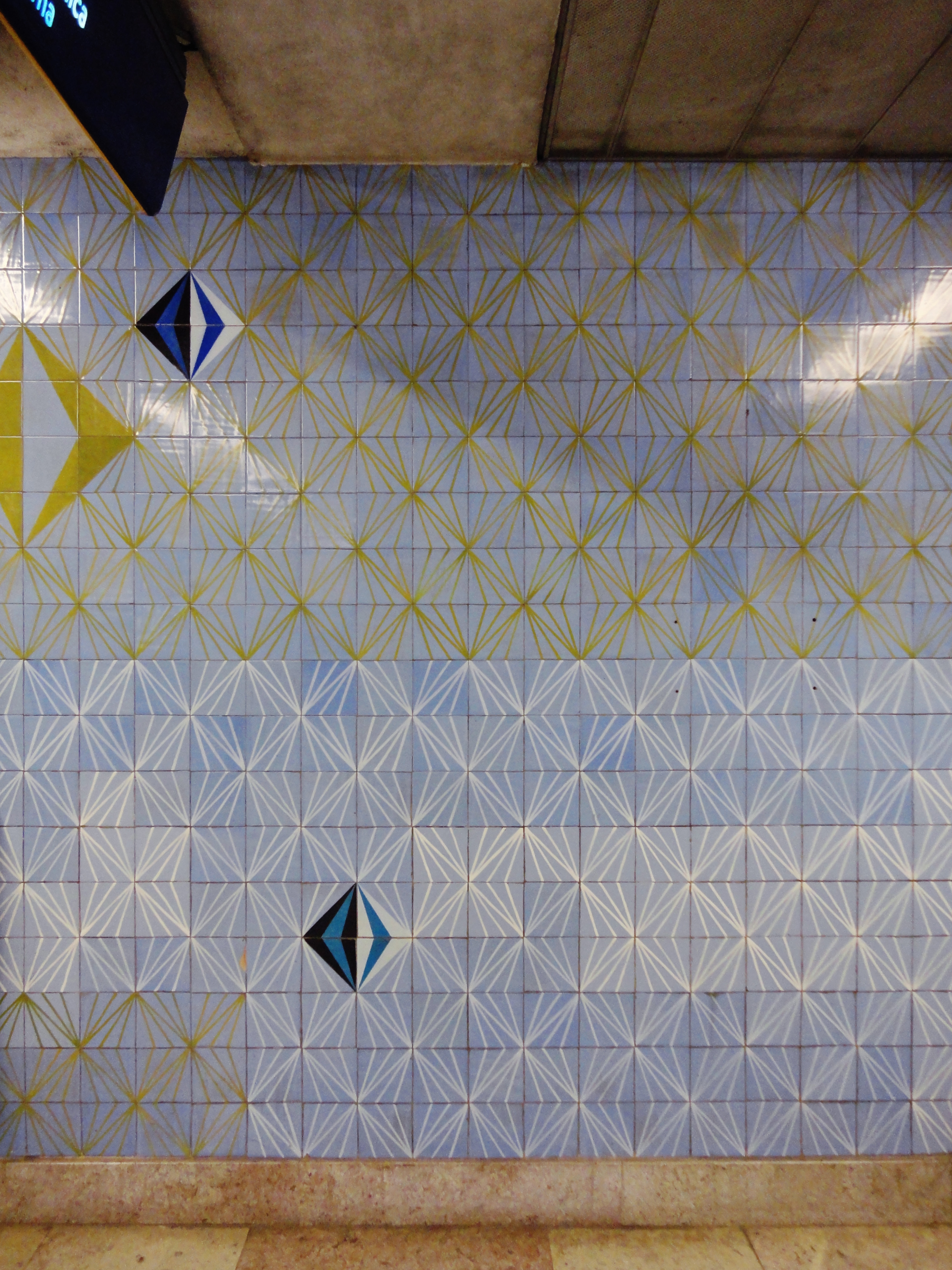
Campo Pequeno (Lisbon Metro)

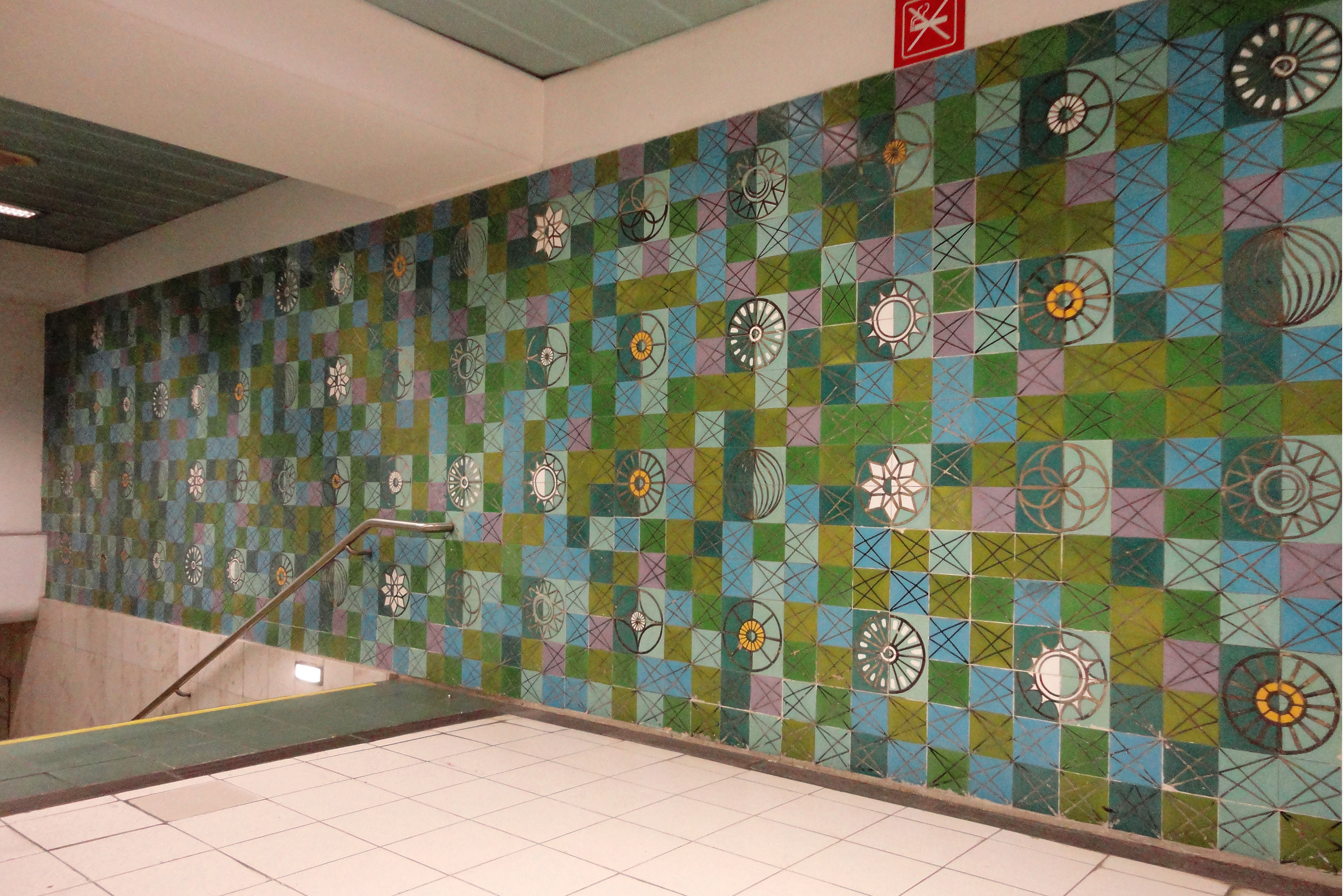
Rossio (Lisbon Metro)

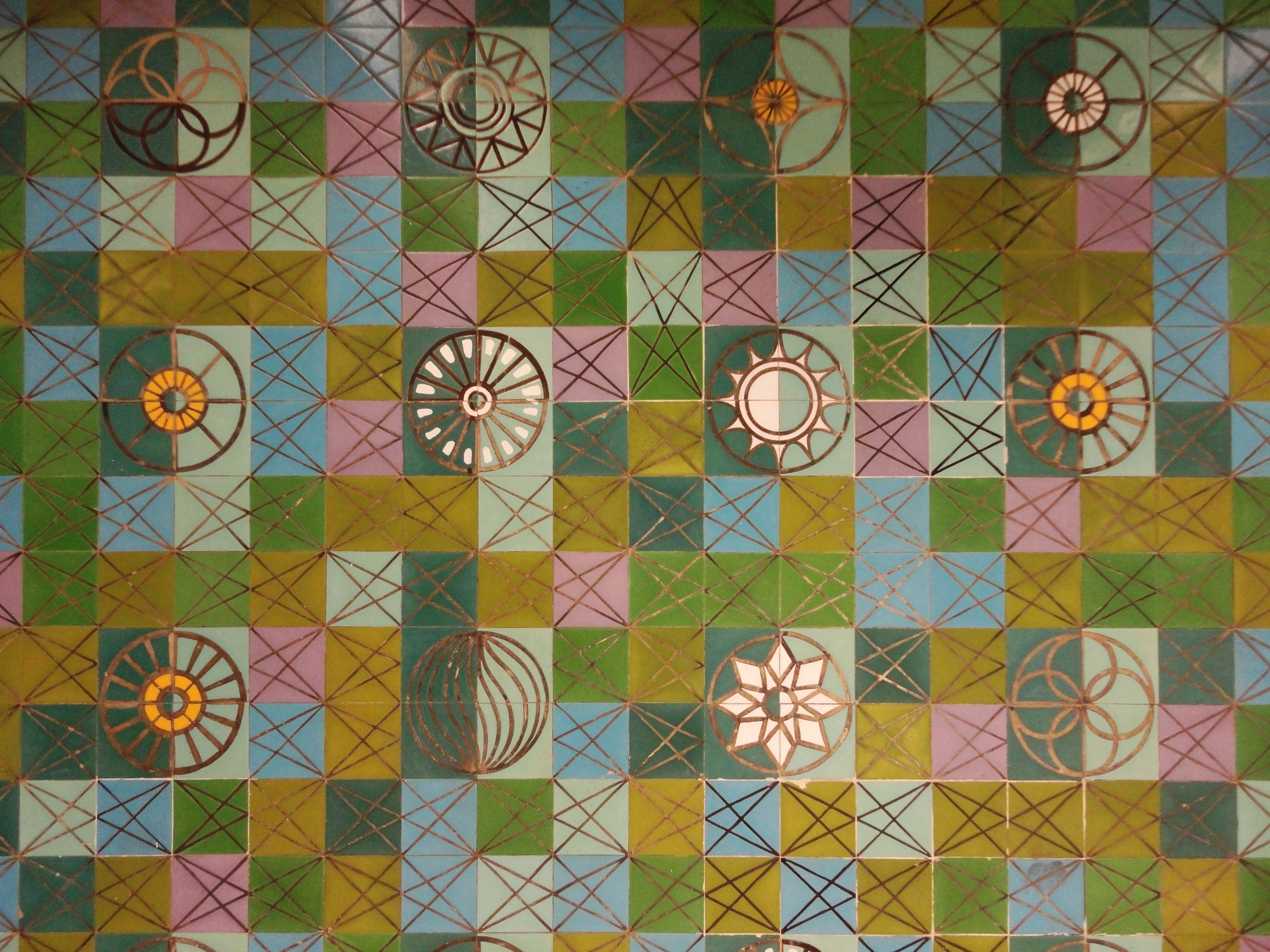
Metro Lisboa Rossio

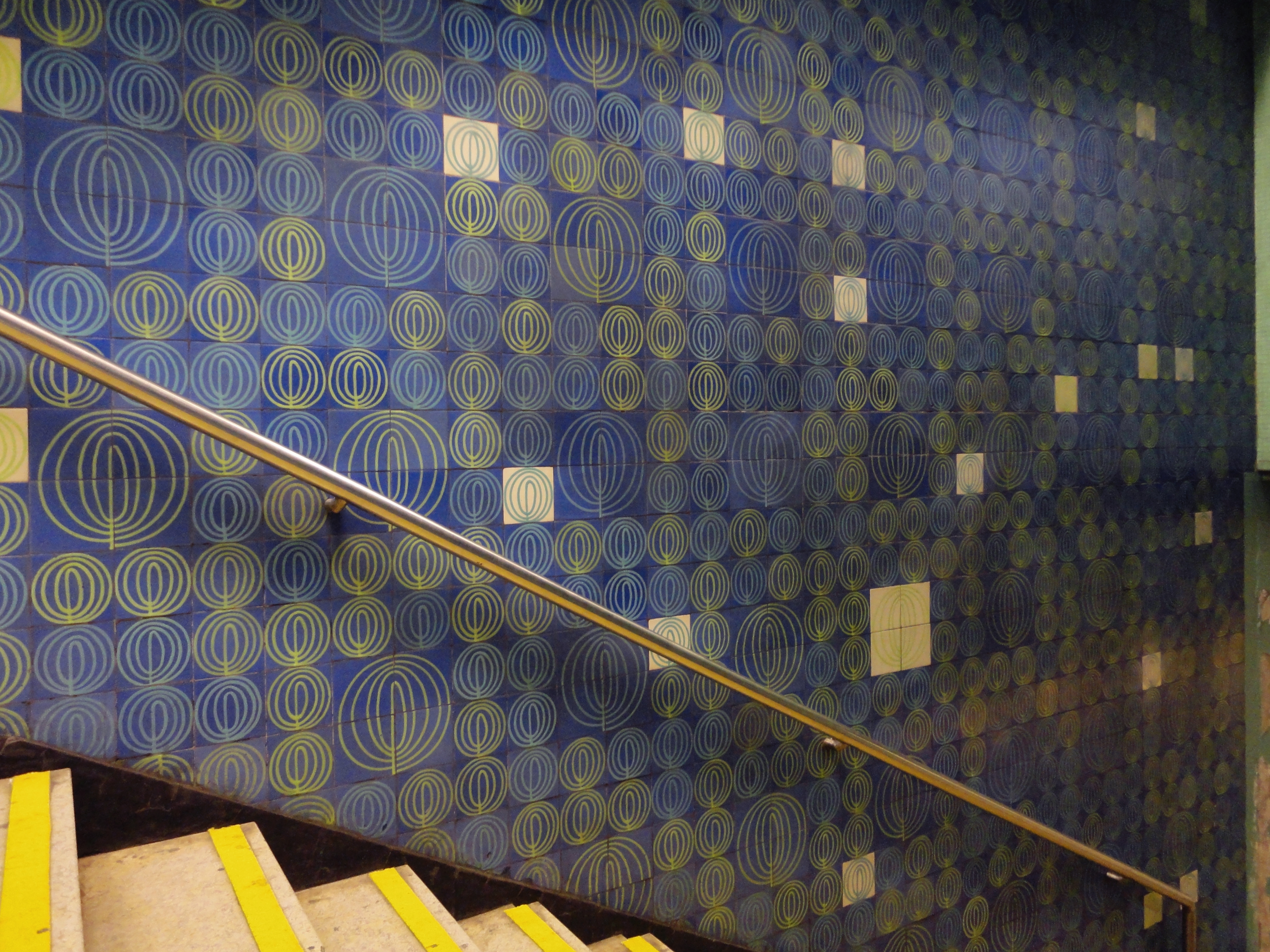
Marquês de Pombal (Lisbon Metro)

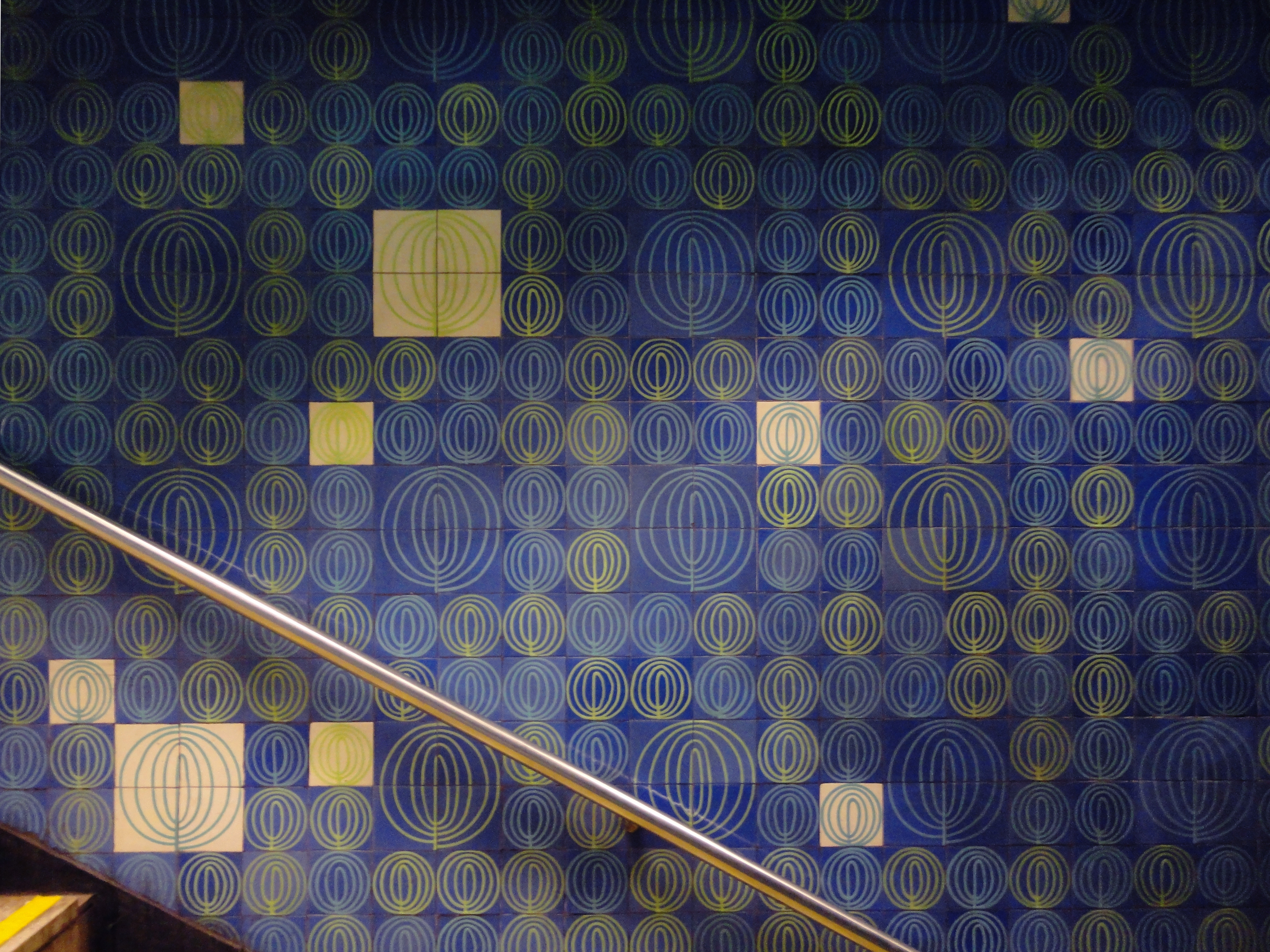
Marquês de Pombal (Lisbon Metro)

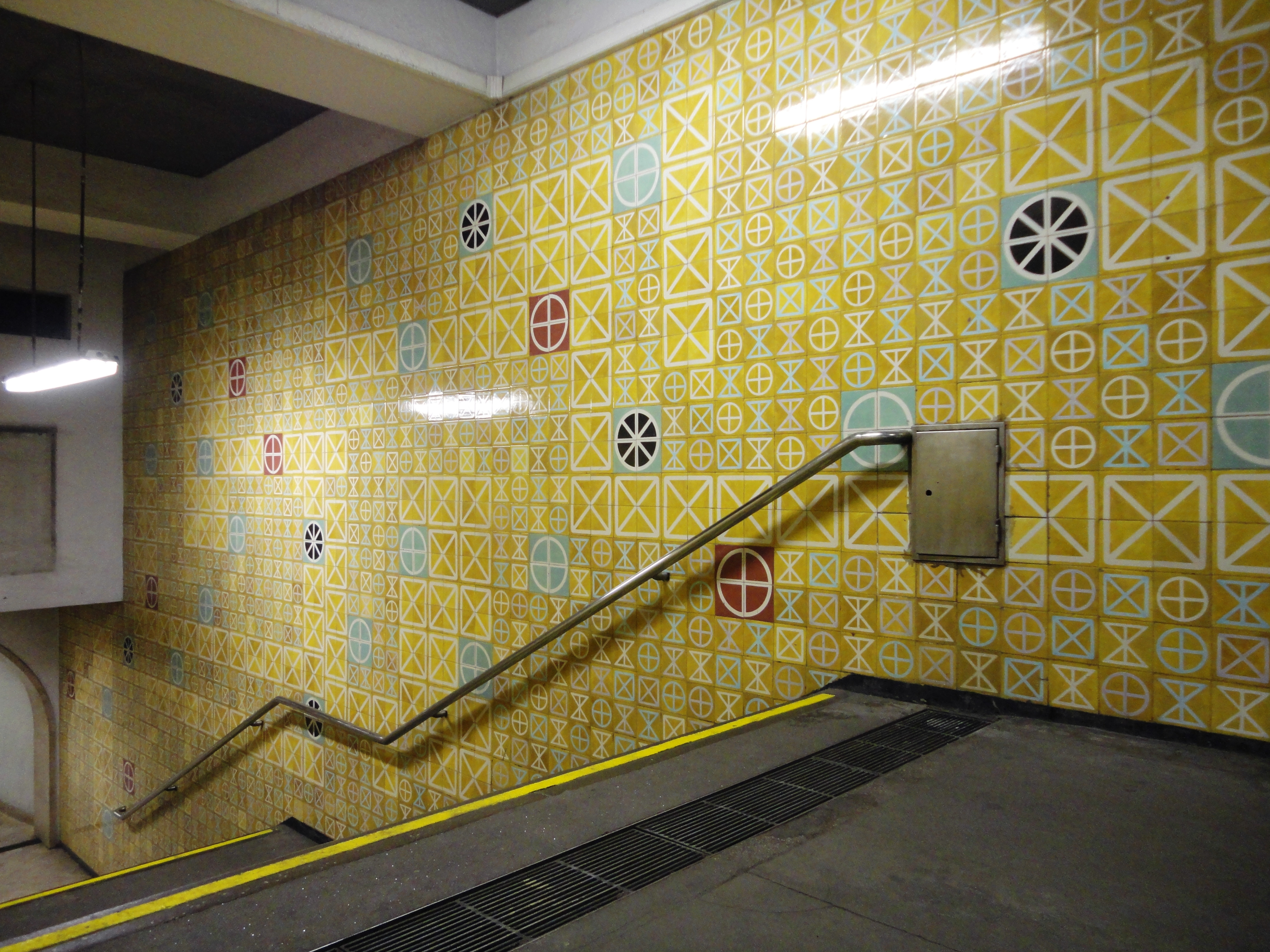
Entre Campos (Lisbon Metro)

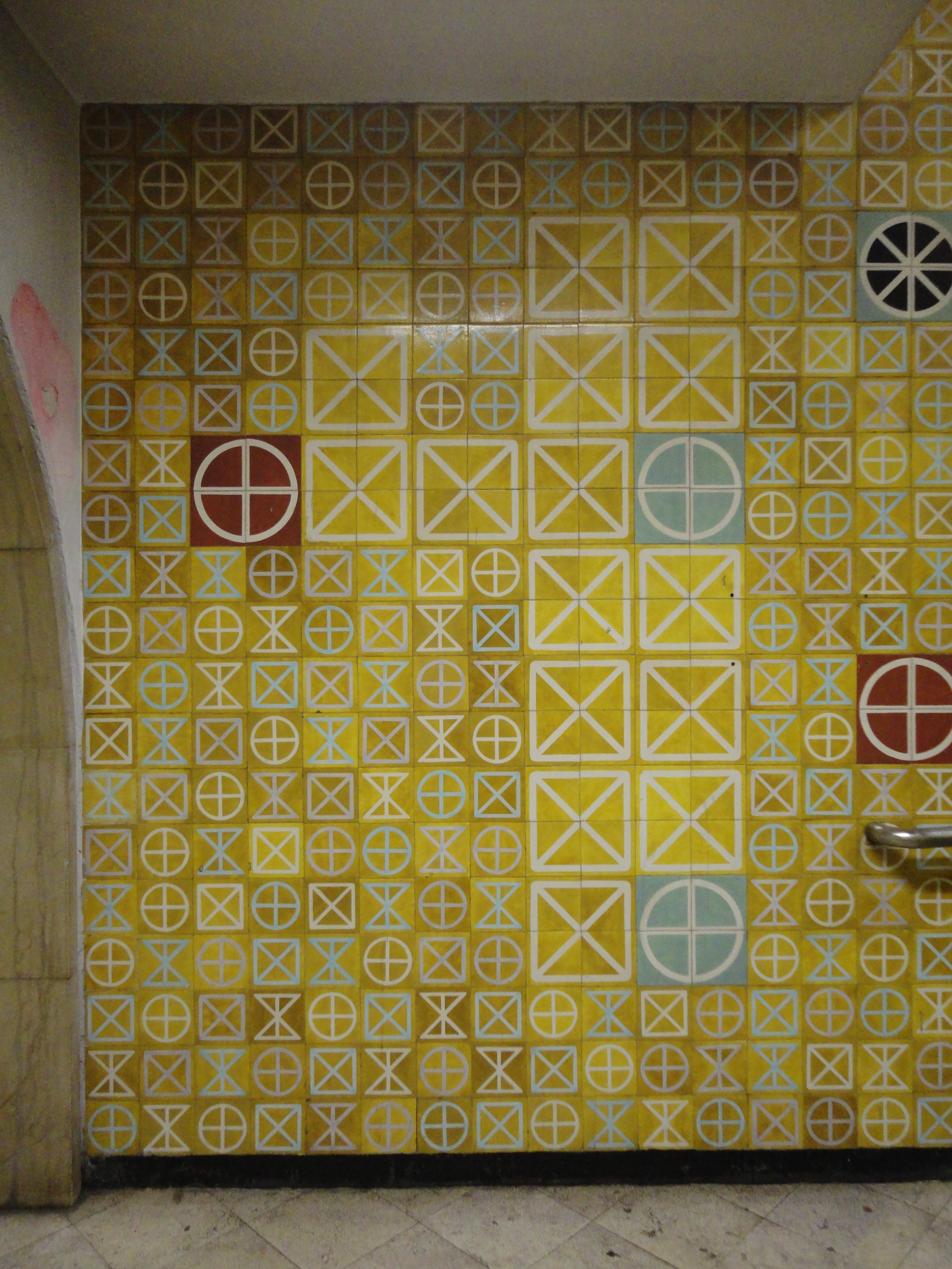
Entre Campos (Lisbon Metro)

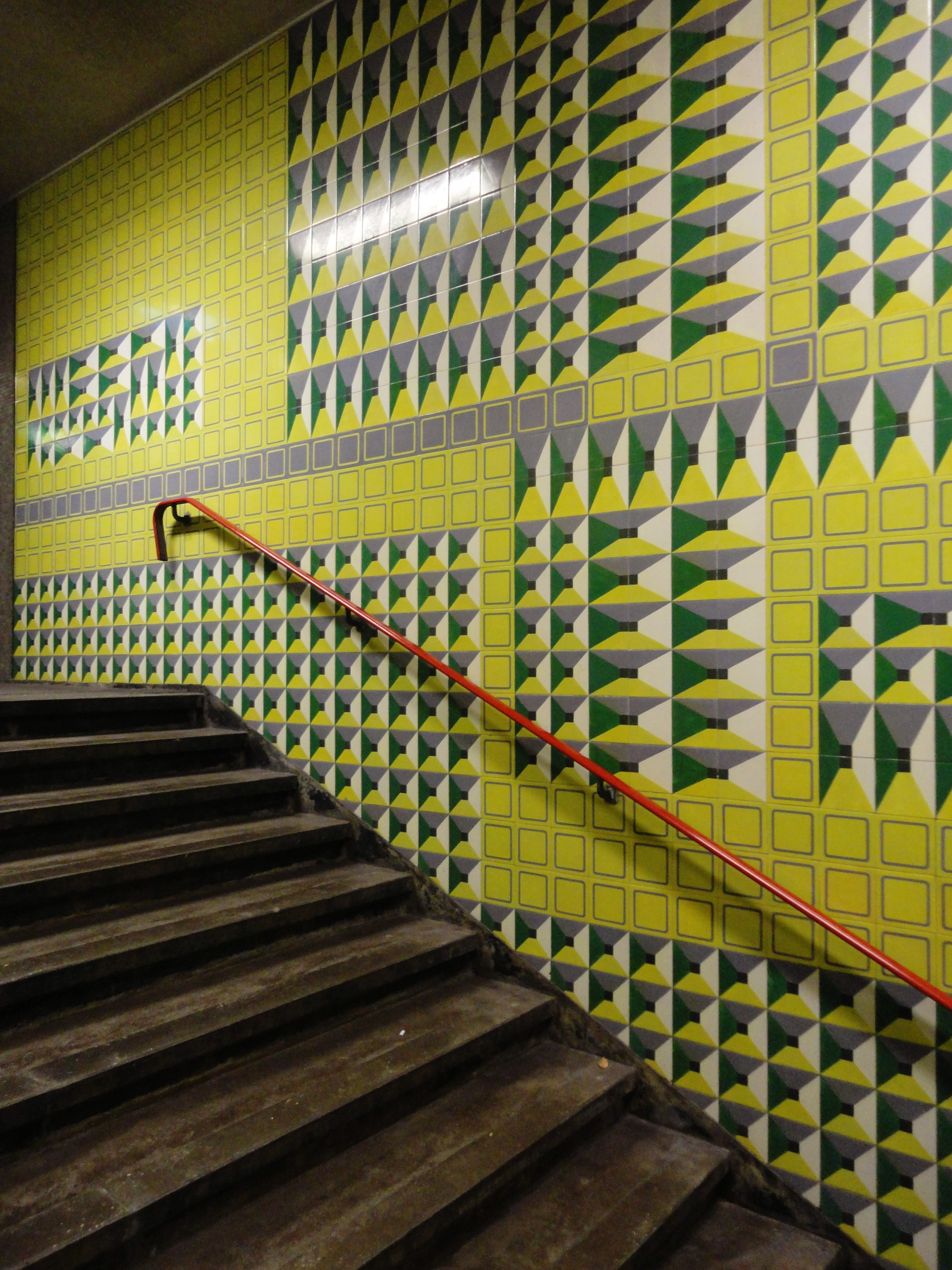
Praça de Espanha (Lisbon Metro)

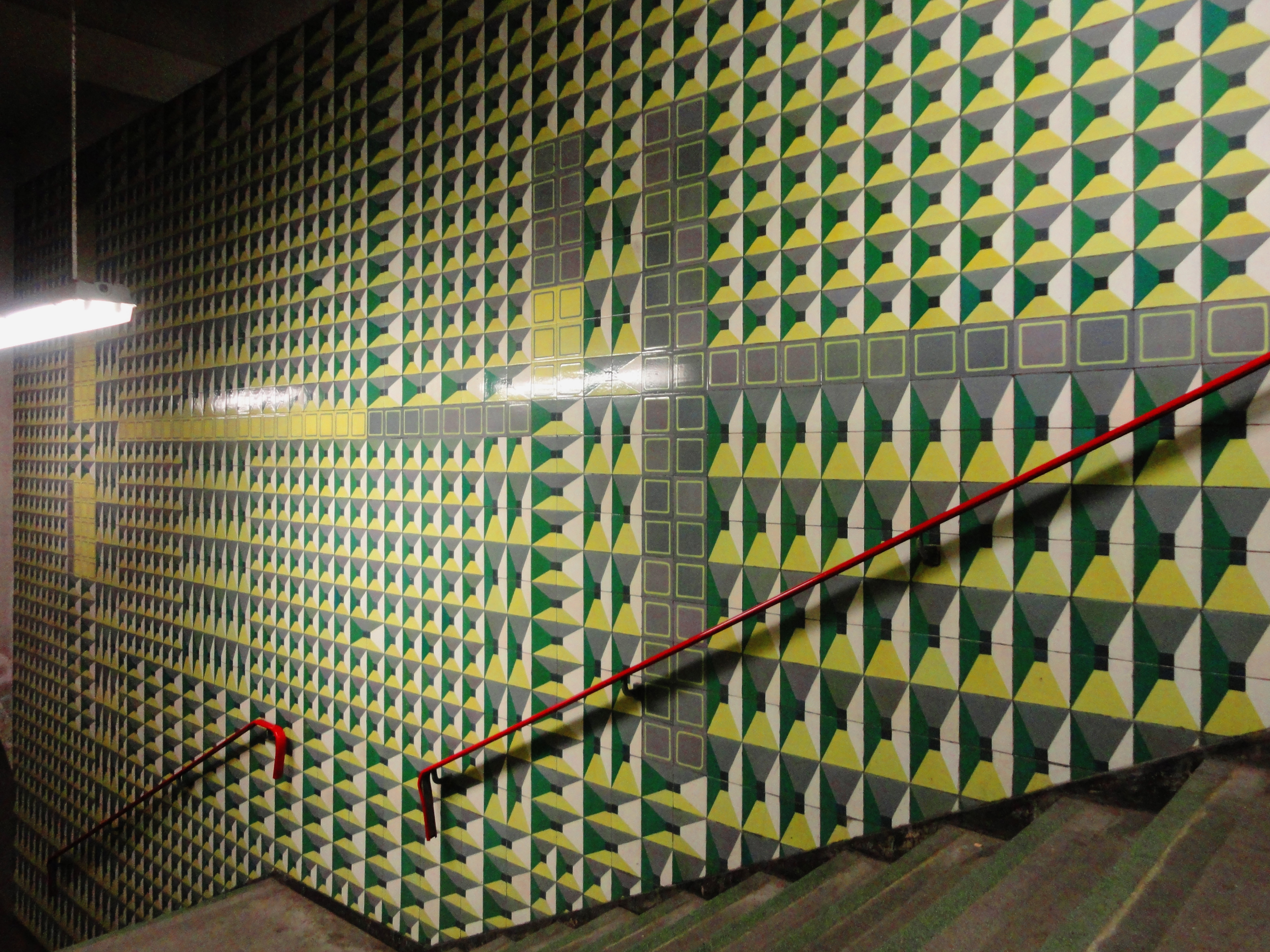
Praça de Espanha (Lisbon Metro)

== Awards and recognition ==
- Souza-Cardoso Award, SPN, 1941.
- Acquisition Grand Prix, National Academy of Fine Arts (2009)
- In 2020, the Portuguese Ministry of Culture took on the responsibility of inventorying and studying its estate. This agreement, signed with her son Francisco Keil do Amaral known as Pitum, also contemplates the deposition and exhibition of it in one of the museums under the responsibility of the Directorate-General for Cultural Heritage (DGPC).
- In 2013, the Museum of the Presidency of the Republic organized the posthumous exhibition On purpose – Maria Keil at the Cascais Citadel Palace, in partnership with the Cascais municipality. It presented a retrospective and comprehensive view of her works.
- A library is named after her in Lumiar, Lisbon.
