= Carlos Botelho =

Portuguese painter and cartoonist (1899–1982)

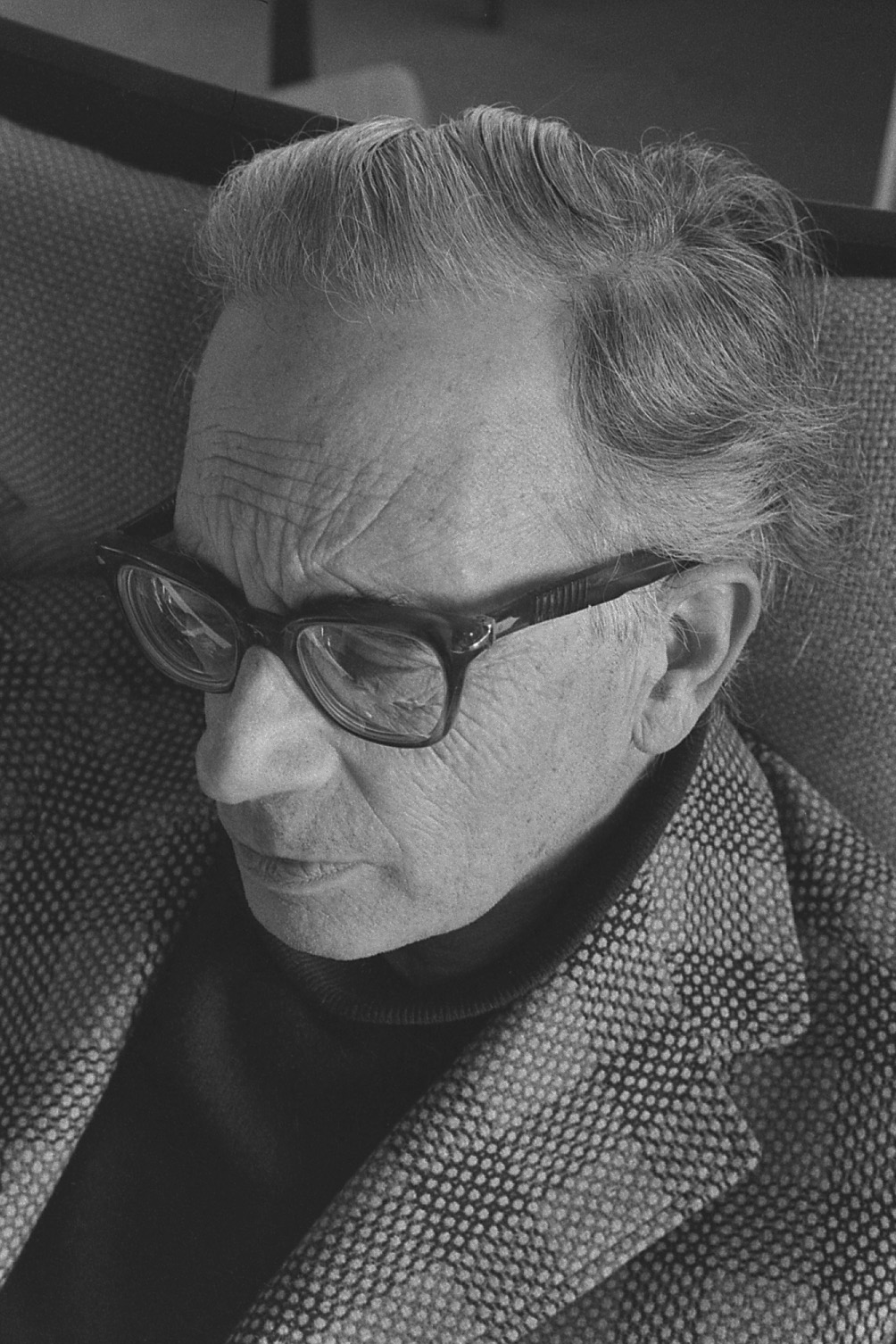
Carlos Botelho, 1971

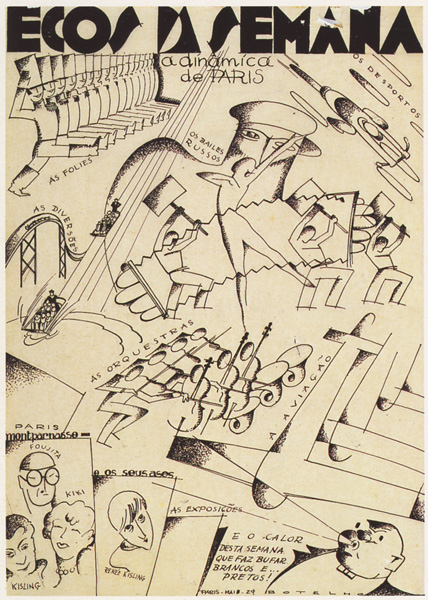
Echoes of the Week - In Paris, May 1929, Indian ink on paper, 44.5 × 30.5 cm

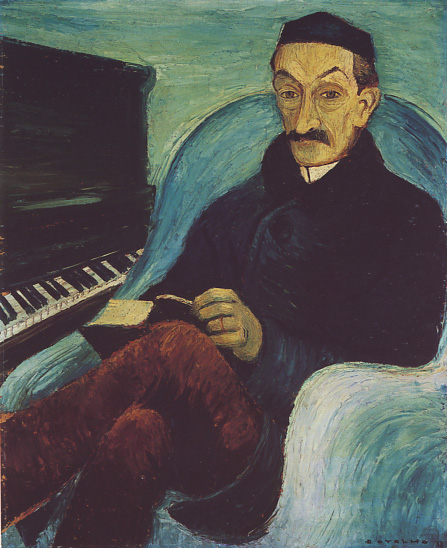
My Father, 1937, oil on board, 73 × 60 cm

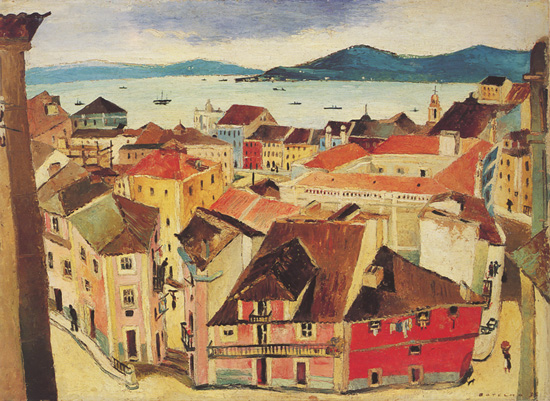
Lisbon Bouquet, 1935, oil on canvas, 72 × 100 cm

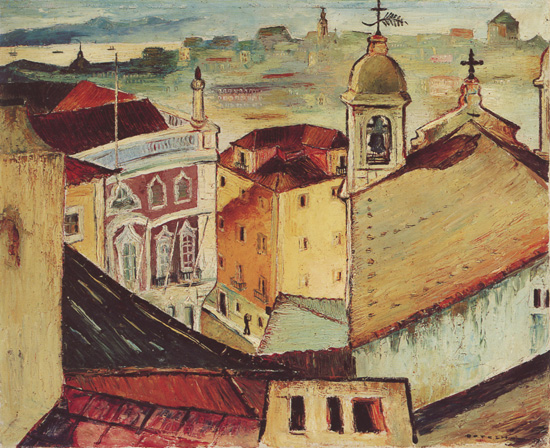
Lisbon – S. Cristóvão, 1937, oil on canvas, 62 × 78 cm

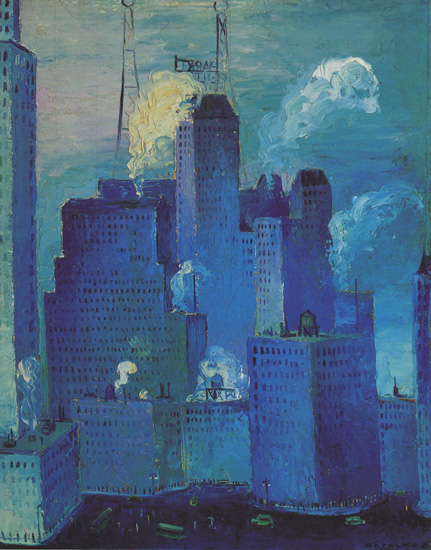
Nocturnal – New York, 1940, oil on board, 78 × 61 cm

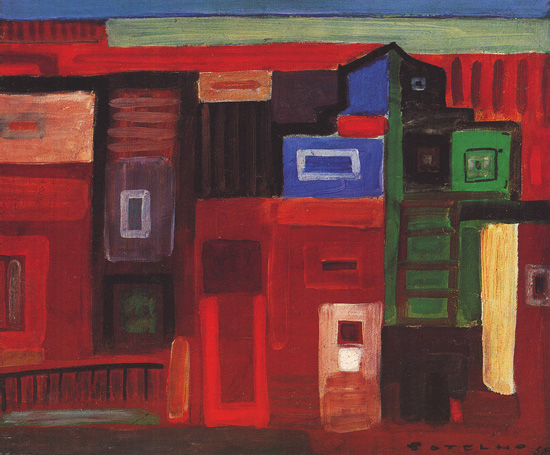
Old Bunch of Houses, 1958, tempera on canvas, 46 × 55 cm

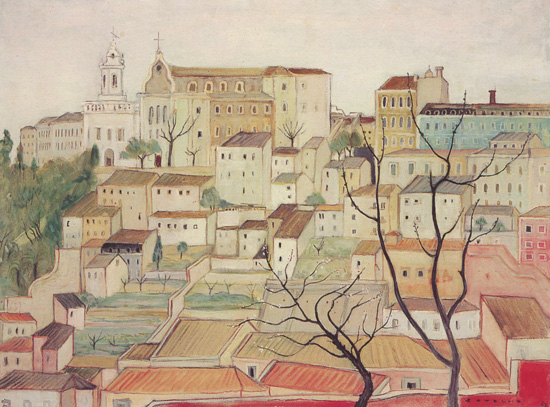
Lisbon, 1962, oil on canvas, 54 × 76.5 cm

Carlos Botelho (18 September 1899, in Lisbon – 18 August 1982, in Lisbon) was a Portuguese painter, illustrator, comics artist, political cartoonist, satirist and caricaturist, whose works are shown at the Chiado Museum and at the Modern Art Centre José de Azeredo Perdigão / Calouste Gulbenkian Foundation, in Lisbon. Botelho was one of the most relevant Portuguese artists of his generation.

== Early years ==
Carlos Botelho was an only child to parents who were musicians, and it was music that dominated his childhood. His father died in 1910.

He attended secondary school at the Pedro Nunes Grammar School, in Lisbon, which is where he held his first solo exhibition and befriends Bento de Jesus Caraça and Luís Ernâni Dias Amado. He enrolled in the Lisbon School of Fine Arts, which he abandoned after a short time, ending his conventional training. Botelho was an self-taught artist.

He marries Beatriz Santos Botelho in 1922. The marriage bore two children: José Rafael and Raquel.

Between 1926 and 1929 he regularly drew comic strips for the children’s weekly ABCzinho, "and is the author of almost the entire front and back pages of each issue, in color".

In 1928, he started a comic page in the weekly publication Sempre Fixe, a collaboration that he maintained for over 22 years and which was the stage for a caustic criticism of a vast range of issues, going from trivial matters of daily life in Lisbon to some of the most relevant events in international life, in a "style that mixed up chronicle, autobiography, journalism, and satire", making it an early example of autobiographical comics. On 8 December 1950, the date when he ended that monumental cycle of work, his Ecos da Semana (Echoes of the Week) made a total of about 1,200 pages, "in a continuous discourse with no intervals or holidays".

"Ecos da Semana are a double, and triple, diary – of the author, between his 29 and 51 years of age, and of a country, or of a world"; but they are also "a diary of the unsaid". In a country strangled by censorship, "national politics is excluded from commentary; […] such were the rules of the game" [2]. This did not stop him, for example, from "confronting the build-up to World War II, through remarkable, crushing drawings making fun of Mussolini and Hitler".

In 1929, Botelho is a well-known humorist. That year he left for Paris, where he attended the Free Academies like the Grande Chaumière; that was the turning point in his career, leading him to definitively opt for painting: "Botelho’s first painting of Lisbon is from 1929: a view from the cupola of the Estrela Basilica, geometrically constructed, with a dense matter […], using expressive thickness of paint".

== Maturity ==
Throughout the 1930s, Botelho had several stays abroad, working on the Portuguese participation in major international exhibitions. He worked on the Portugal pavilion at the International and Colonial Exhibition of Vincennes, Paris, 1930–1931, and on the Portugal stand at the Lyon International Fair, 1935. From 1937 on, he was a member, along with Bernardo Marques and Fred Kradolfer, of the SPN (Secretariat for National Propaganda) team of decorators charged with producing the Portugal pavilions at the exhibition of Paris, New York and San Francisco: International Exhibition of Arts and Techniques, Paris, 1937; 1939 New York World's Fair; Golden Gate International Exposition, San Francisco, California, 1939.

In 1930, he set up in his studio in the Costa do Castelo, next to St George’s Castle, Lisbon, in the house that his wife, a primary education teacher, had a right to due to her position. The location of the house, where he lived until 1949, no doubt influenced his subject matter, providing him with subjects and references that marked his artistic career.

In 1937, during his stay in Paris, he visits a retrospective of the work of Van Gogh which leaves him "extremely impressed", strengthening the expressive violence of his painting; and he discovers Ensor on a brief visit to Flanders.

In 1938, he received the Amadeo de Souza-Cardoso prize for the portrait of his father.

In 1939, he won 1st Prize at the International Contemporary Art Exposition, San Francisco, U.S., which allowed him to buy the land and later build his house-studio in Buzano, Parede (near to Lisbon).

In 1940, he was a member of the decorating team for the Portuguese World Exhibition, Lisbon; and at the 5th Modern Art Exhibition, SPN, Lisbon, he received the Columbano Prize.

In 1949, he left the house in the Costa do Castelo, and he settled in Buzano.

From 1955 on, he returned to Lisbon to live, now far from the historic centre, in the new neighborhood of Areeiro.

In 1969, he retired from his position in the Technical Services of the SNI (National Information Secretariat), Palácio Foz, where he had worked since the 1940s.

== Work ==
"For Botelho the thirties are a thrilling decade full of extremely dense production", and his painting is formally characterized by a strong connection to expressionism. Within it one can detect three different strands of subject matter:

Firstly, the urban landscape of the city in which he was born and lived. Lisbon soon stands out as the "predominant iconography, even the body of the deepening of the painter’s recourses and of their successive poetics". It is not, however, the almost single path we find in his later work: "landscape is enunciated […] as a possibility in this recently-started career, but it is not yet the imperative matrix of the future". Botelho will also paint other cities: Paris, Florence, Amsterdam, New Orleans and, above all, New York: "In terms of Portuguese art at the end of the […] nineteen thirties, these paintings are located at the vanguard of everything that was being done at the time".

Alongside the urban landscapes, and "intending to free himself from the strict appreciation that had consecrated him as a humorist", Botelho turned his attention to the social realm in works that thematically and stylistically bring him close to the "expressionist painting of the Northern European tradition, enunciating a sense of research that could be connoted to Van Gogh’s Dutch period". His acrobats, his blind men and fishermen are solid and dense figures, showing us another facet of his work.

The third path that will occupy him throughout the initial decade is the portrait, which will culminate in the portraits of Beatriz, his parents and his children. And if the portrait of Botelho’s father, from 1937, is "an axial moment in his work", the portraits of his children are the final step in the autonomization of his approach: "No concession to the conventional taste in these two portraits, no sentimentality for the models, but rather a brusqueness of gesture and of attitude, as if his intimate relationship with them in no way affected his desire for painting".

From the 1930s onwards, Botelho’s Lisbon becomes an intensely personal realm, capable of revealing something profound, granting us "the view of an archetypical city whose beauty is the mediating form of the truth of a people or of its specific anthropology […]. With a great simplicity of processes and effects, [Botelho] created a plastic universe as the symbolic and imaginative mirror of one of the most significant facets of the Portuguese spirit". He records the city, "but, more deeply, he invents it, shifting the accidents and the places, subjecting them to a plastic demand. Yet we deeply acknowledge that this “painted” city is as real, or more real (?), than the existing one".

His painting will subtly change. The softening of the expressionist intensity opens up paths to a different poetic dimension and to a new awareness of the canvas’ flatness. In the 1950s that option becomes radicalized: "Botelho starts out from modernist principles, like the autonomy of the line [or] the rejection of Renaissance perspective”, in “different” works in which he more than ever comes close to abstraction.

The formal principles he investigates in these works will reappear shortly after under a different guise in the formal structuring of the urban landscapes that occupy him until the end: "The last productive clash came with the affirmation of abstractionism in the 1950s, via the Paris school and Vieira da Silva, and this was decisive for the cycles of his long final production: he did not cut off the metaphorical body of Lisbon [...] but disciplined it in rhymes and chromatic spatialities in which light is the determining referent.

== Exhibitions and collections ==
Botelho exhibited his work in numerous solo and group exhibitions, among which one may highlight: 25th Venice Biennial, 1950; 1st Sao Paulo Biennial, 1951; 3rd Sao Paulo Biennial, São Paulo, Brazil, 1955; 4th Sao Paulo Biennial, 1957; 1st Exhibition of Fine Arts, Calouste Gulbenkian Foundation, Lisbon, 1957; 50 Years of Modern Art, Brussels, 1958; 30th Venice Biennial; 2nd Exhibition of Fine Arts, Calouste Gulbenkian Foundation, Lisbon, 1961; 8th Sao Paulo Biennial, 1965; etc.

He is represented in many public and private collections, such as: Lisbon City Council (Câmara Municipal de Lisboa); Chiado Museum, Lisbon; Modern Art Centre José de Azeredo Perdigão, Calouste Gulbenkian Foundation, Lisbon; Sao Paulo Museum of Modern Art, São Paulo, Brazil; etc.

== Bibliography ==
- Botelho, Carlos; GUSMÃO, Adriano de - Carlos Botelho. Lisboa: Edições Ática (Coleção Hifen), 1947.
- Botelho, Carlos - Carlos Botelho: os anos diferentes. Lisboa: Livros Horizonte, 1994. ISBN 972-24-0861-5
- Botelho, Carlos - Botelho: centenário do nascimento. Lisboa: Fundação Arpad Szenes - Vieira da Silva, 1999. ISBN 972-8467-04-4
- BOTELHO, Carlos – Botelho, Desenho: Exposição Comemorativa do Centenário do Nascimento. Almada: Casa da Cerca, Centro de Arte Contenporânea, 1999. ISBN 972-8392-62-1
- "Botelho, Carlos" in Phaidon Dictionary of Twentieth-Century Art. London, New York, Phaidon Press, 1973, p. 46.
- MENDES, Manuel – Carlos Botelho. Lisboa : Artis, 1959. (OCLC 12326185)
- QUADROS, António – A Pintura de Carlos Botelho. In: BOTELHO, Carlos – Carlos Botelho. Lisboa: Editorial Notícias, 1964. (OCLC 2482092)
- 640343)
- SILVA, Raquel Henriques da; Botelho, Manuel, Carlos Botelho. Lisboa: Editorial Presença, 1995. ISBN 972-23-1978-7
