= Manuel Botelho =

Portuguese artist (born 1950)

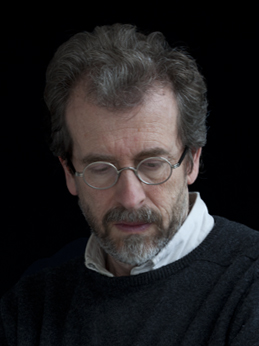
- Botelho in 2009
- Born: 1950 (age 75–76); Lisbon, Portugal
- Education: Byam Shaw School of Art; Slade School of Fine Art
- Occupation: Artist
- Website: www.manuelbotelho.com

Manuel Botelho (born 1950, Lisbon) is a Portuguese artist. He lives and works in Estoril, Portugal, and teaches at the Faculty of Fine Arts, University of Lisbon.

Botelho was born in Lisbon, Portugal. He studied architecture at the Lisbon School of Fine Arts from 1968–76, and painting at the Byam Shaw School of Art (1983–85) and the Slade School of Fine Art (1985–87), London. In 2005 he held a retrospective exhibition at the Modern Art Centre, Calouste Gulbenkian Foundation, Lisbon.

== Artistic practice ==
Botelho's work has always been concerned with the socio-political realm, and his 1969 collages focused on the May 1968 Paris uprisings and the Vietnam War. From 1970 to 1983 he was mainly involved in architecture, with his art practice remaining marginal and intermittent.

After moving to London in 1983 – where he kept a studio until 1996 – his work became more allegorical and more concerned with questions of personal and collective identity, and his interest in the unveiling of the unconscious was closely linked to his fascination for Goya: "His poetics and iconography spring from the adolescent revelation of Goya's Black Paintings [...] at the Prado Museum."

His early 1980s works were often closely linked to his own life, speaking of loss or separation. Simultaneously, he searched for his roots in the past, and he found himself reflecting on how the present seemed haunted by the memories of 41 years of oppression (Salazar and Caetano's dictatorship – 1933–1974): "We sense it is not Botelho' personal nightmare, but a collective one; the subject he is taking on is the ruinous fabric of a whole society." At the Byam Shaw School of Art Botelho "created a new vision of oppression with a cast of archetypal characters, led by the figure of the Priest/Bishop/Dictator", and by the time he arrived at the Slade, he "was discovering a genuine iconography – a world of donkeys and hovels, of peasants working the fields with primitive tools, of crumbling stone – built walls – a pre-industrial past that stands as a metaphor for modern Portugal".

This dark vision slowly eased off, and the "themes of aggression and domination [gave] way to a more intimate and personal iconography"; the formal quest, the structuring of the picture plane and the push and pull of pictorial space became top priorities as he revisited Picasso's synthetic cubism in paintings where "eroticism, or the more generalized sensuality of the relationship between mother and child" became main themes.

As he distanced himself from cubism, his drawing became more subtle and sensitive, and a dynamic sense of movement liberated his figures from gravity and immobility. By the late 1990s his multi-layered representations alluded to a wide range of subject matter, from present-day life to traditional religious themes, "bridging the gap between sacred and profane, contemporary temporality and timelessness".

In 2006 he "resorted to a new medium, photography, to build a body of work that nevertheless reflects the main characteristics of his practice: examination of historical issues, references to the Western pictorial tradition, and figuration as a stylistic signature". For his long-term project Confidential/Declassified, on the Portuguese Colonial War (1961–74), he spent 15 months at the Lisbon Military Museum taking photographs that depict the weaponry of both the Portuguese and the African forces, from improvised single-shot firearms to the G3 and AK-47 rifles. And in subsequent series he reinstated a type of narrative that relates to his earlier painting, "using elements drawn from a concrete war [...] to deal with that particular war, as well as all other wars; and also [...] war as an abstract reality". Examining a traumatic event through an allegorical narrative, "Botelho probes Portuguese collective consciousness with sensitivity without failing to point out the political turmoil of the colonial era".

His 2011–12 works include large-scale 3D pieces made with campaign tent cloths and the sound installation "Letters of Love and Longing", based on the letters exchanged between a soldier in Portuguese Guinea and his girlfriend in Lisbon: "sounding like a radio soap opera [...] the text locates us in time and in space, showing us the dimension of feelings: Portugal and Guinea, nineteen-sixties and Colonial War, love and death, jealousy and hope".

== Solo exhibitions ==
Botelho has regularly exhibited since 1986.

He has held solo exhibitions at galleries and museums, such as: Calouste Gulbenkian Foundation, Lisbon (1986, 1994); National Museum of Ancient Art, Lisbon (2000); Modern Art Center José de Azeredo Perdigão, Calouste Gulbenkian Foundation, Lisbon (2005); Elvas Contemporary Art Museum, Elvas (2008); EDP Foundation, Lisbon (2008); Lagos Cultural Centre, Lagos, Portugal (2005, 2009); Cascais Cultural Centre, Cascais (2011); etc.

And in galleries such as: Módulo, Lisbon (1987, 1989, 1991, 1995, 1998, 2001, 2003); Módulo, Oporto (1987, 1988, 1990, 1991, 1994, 1996, 1998, 2001); Flowers East, London (1992); Lisboa 20/Miguel Nabinho, Lisbon (2006, 2008, 2009); Fernando Santos, Oporto (2009); etc.

== Sources ==
- FREITAS, Maria Helena – Manuel Botelho: The Praise of Painting. In: BOTELHO, Manuel – Manuel Botelho: Pintura 1990–94. Lisbon: Calouste Gulbenkian Foundation, 1994.
- AMADO, Miguel – Manuel Botelho, 2008, Artforum Online
- HYMAN, Timothy. In: BOTELHO, Manuel – Manuel Botelho: Pintura e Desenho 84/86. Lisbon: Calouste Gulbenkian Foundation, 1986.
- PINHARANDA, João – Book of Errors [2000]. In BOTELHO, Manuel – Manuel Botelho: Painting and Drawing. Lisbon: Estar Editora Lda., 2000. ISBN 972-8095-78-3
- PINHARANDA, João – World Life and Self-Portraits [2005]. In: BOTELHO, Manuel – Manuel Botelho: Desenho e Pintura, 1984–2004. Lisbon: Calouste Gulbenkian Foundation, 2005. ISBN 972-635-162-6
- PINHARANDA, João – Manuel Botelho's Secret Reports [2008]. In: BOTELHO, Manuel – Confidential/Declassified II: Combat Rations. Lisbon: Fundação EDP, 2008.
- PINHARANDA, João – Tell me what it was like… [2011]. In BOTELHO, Manuel – Manuel Botelho: Letters of Love and Longing. Cascais: Centro Cultural de Cascais, 2011. ISBN 978-972-8986-49-0.
- PORFÍRIO, José Luís – Visitation. In: Manuel Botelho: Pintura e desenho 1997–2000. Lisbon: Museu Nacional de Arte Antiga (National Museum of Ancient Art), 2000.
- ROSENGARTEN, Ruth. In: BOTELHO, Manuel – Manuel Botelho. London: Flowers East, 1992.
