= Ofélia Marques =

Portuguese artist

- Born: Ofélia Gonçalves Pereira da Cruz; 14 November 1902; Lisbon, Portugal
- Died: 17 December 1952 (aged 50); Lisbon, Portugal
- Known for: Painting, drawing, illustrations, caricatures
- Movement: Modernism
- Spouse: Bernardo Marques

Ofélia Marques (1902–1952) was a Portuguese modernist painter, caricaturist and illustrator, best known in her lifetime for her illustrations of children's books.

== Early life ==
Ofélia Gonçalves Pereira da Cruz, later known as Ofélia Marques, was born in the Portuguese capital of Lisbon on 14 November 1902. In 1911, she was enrolled at Lyceum Maria Pia in Lisbon. One of the first women to attend university in Portugal, she enrolled in the Romance languages philology course at the Faculty of Arts of the University of Lisbon. However, she abandoned her degree in the 3rd year and never graduated. From then on, she dedicated herself to an artistic career. This decision is likely to have been influenced by her friendship with the artist, Bernardo Marques, who later became her husband. Part of the modernist school, her paintings were first exhibited in 1926 at the 2nd Salão de Outono (Autumn salon) of the Sociedade Nacional de Belas Artes in Lisbon.

== Artistic career ==
Marques illustrated for several magazines, albeit sporadically. She collaborated with Atlântico, Panorama, Revista de Portugal and Informação. In Civilização, in 1928, she illustrated the first children's stories by Rosa Silvestre (a pseudonym of the feminist leader Maria Lamas) and also collaborated with Lamas in Biblioteca dos Pequeninos in 1931. In 1925, she illustrated the first edition of Aventuras Maravilhosas de João Sem Medo (The marvellous adventures of João Without Fear), by José Gomes Ferreira. After that, she became increasingly known for her illustrations of children's books and short stories by Portuguese authors. Apart from Ferreira, she also worked with Fernanda de Castro and Natércia Freire.

Having been stereotyped as a child painter, in the 1930s she created a range of, often scathing, caricatures of friends, imagining them as children. After her first exhibition in 1926 she continued to exhibit, in more than a dozen exhibitions, but never had a solo exhibition, apparently because of her lack of interest in organizing one. In 1946 she exhibited at the First Exposição Geral de Artes Plásticas (General Exhibition of Plastic Arts) held by the Sociedade Nacional de Belas Artes in Lisbon. In parallel with the work she did for public exhibition and sale, she also did, privately, self-portraits and erotic drawings. In her erotic and often lesbian scenes she was transgressing the puritanical morality imposed on Portuguese women at that time by the Estado Novo dictatorship.

== Awards ==
In 1940 she was awarded the Souza-Cardosa prize for her portrait of the poet, Luísa d'Eça Leal.

== Death ==
Ofélia Marques divorced her husband in the 1940s. On 17 December 1952, she committed suicide.

== Legacy ==
Posthumously, Marques has been represented in about twenty exhibitions, in some of them with works seen for the first time. A retrospective was held in Almada in 2002. Her lesbian paintings were particularly evident in the exhibition Tudo O Que Eu Quero (All I want) at the Calouste Gulbenkian Museum in Lisbon in 2021, an exhibition of the work of 40 women, which was part of the cultural program of the Portuguese Presidency of the Council of the European Union in that year. A street in Caparica in Almada was named after her.
