= Bernardo Marques =

Portuguese artist (1898–1962)

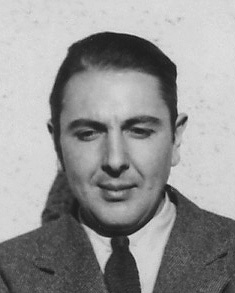
Bernardo Marques (1939)

Bernardo Loureiro Marques (Silves, 1898 - Lisbon, 1962), was a Portuguese painter, illustrator, graphic artist and caricaturist. He was one of the most relevant Portuguese artists of his generation. He was married to the painter, Ofélia Marques.

Mainly a self-taught artist, Bernardo Marques emerged in the 1920s as a graphic artist and caricaturist. In 1929, he visited Berlin and was deeply influenced by German expressionism (Georg Grosz in particular). His work thereafter became formally and thematically stronger.

Later his drawing became lighter and more poetic; he shifted his attention from people to things, particularly landscape. His final mode reveals highly sensitive visions of Lisbon, Sintra and the Algarve.

== Bibliography ==
- Marques, Bernardo – Bernardo Marques: Obras de 1950 a 1960. Lisbon: Calouste Gulbenkian Foundation, 1966.
- Marques, Bernardo – Bernardo Marques. Lisbon: Calouste Gulbenkian Foundation, Lisboa, 1989.
- Marques, Bernardo – Bernardo Marques. Macau: Fundação Oriente, 1991.
- Ruivo, Marina Bairrão - Bernardo Marques, 1898-1962. Lisbon: Ed. Presença, 1993.
