= Instituto Nacional de Estatística =

Instituto Nacional de Estatística (Portuguese for "National Institute for Statistics") may refer to:

- Instituto Nacional de Estatística (Cape Verde) - the national statistical agency of Cape Verde
- Instituto Nacional de Estatística (Mozambique) - the national statistical agency of Mozambique
- Instituto Nacional de Estatística (Portugal) - the national statistical agency of Portugal
- Instituto Nacional de Estatística (São Tomé and Príncipe) - the national statistical agency of São Tomé and Príncipe
- Instituto Nacional de Estatística - the original name of the present Instituto Brasileiro de Geografia e Estatística, the national statistical agency of Brazil
