= Alto do Pina, Lisbon =

Quarter and former civil parish in Lisbon, Portugal

Alto do Pina
- Quarter and former civil parish
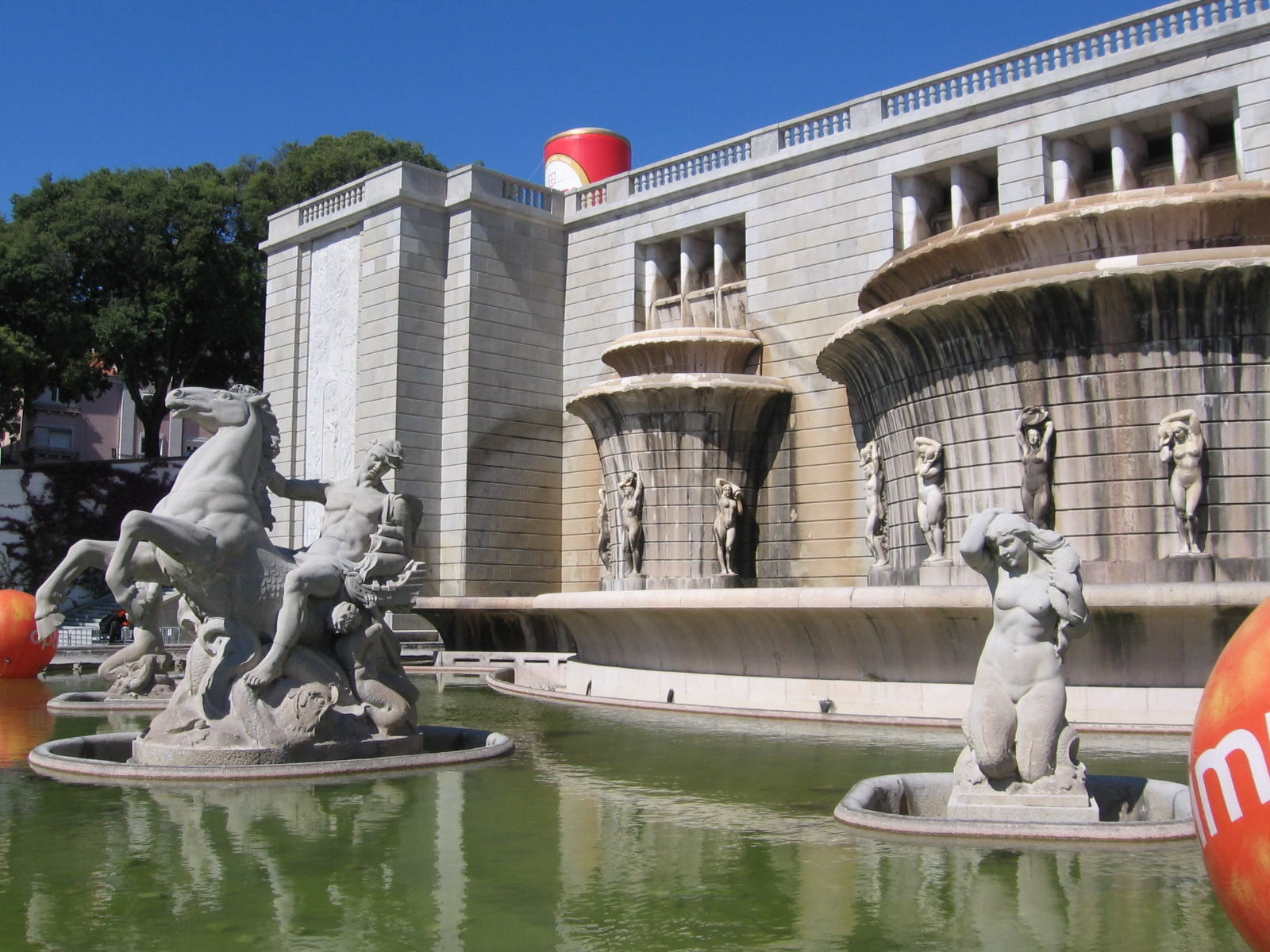
- Fonte Luminosa at the eastern end of Alameda D.Afonso Henriques

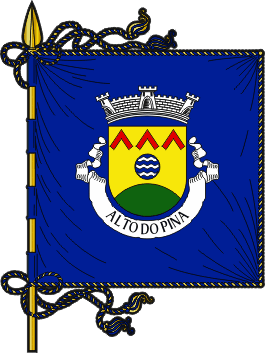
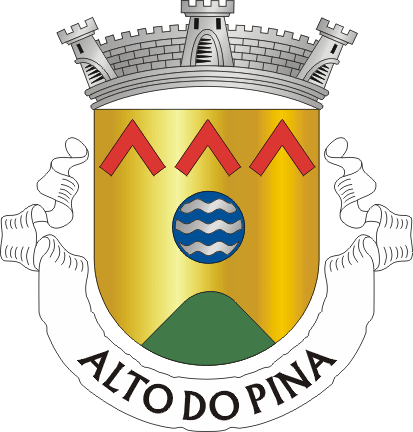
- Flag Coat of arms
- Interactive map of Alto do Pina
- Location within Portugal
- Coordinates: 38.740°N 9.128°W
- Country: Portugal
- Metro area: Lisbon
- Region: Greater Lisbon
- District: Lisbon
- Municipality: Lisbon
- Admin. district: 4th
- Creation: 7 February 1959
- Dissolution: 8 November 2012

Government
  - Type: Civil parish
  - Body: Junta (executive) and Assembly (deliberative)
  - President (last, 2009-12): Fernando Braamcamp (Lisboa com Sentido (PSD-CDS–PP-MPT-PPM)
  - President of the Assembly (last): Diogo da Silva Cunha (PSD)

Area
  - Total: 0.84 km^{2} (0.32 sq mi)

Population (2011)
  - Total: 10,333
  - Density: 12,000/km^{2} (32,000/sq mi)
- Time zone: UTC+00:00 (WET)
  - Summer (DST): UTC+01:00 (WEST)
- Postal code: 1900
- Patron Saints: Twelve Apostles (Note: Until 1 July 1972, the patron saint was Saint Thérèse of the Child Jesus)
- Former seat: Rua Abade Faria, 37; 1900-044 Lisboa
- Former website: jf-altodopina.pt
- Now part of: Areeiro (UIT Centre)

Alto do Pina (Portuguese pronunciation: [ˈaltu ðu ˈpinɐ]) is a Portuguese quarter and former civil parish, located in the municipality of Lisbon. Located in the centre of the city, the former parish territory had a population of 10,333 inhabitants within an area of 0.84 km^{2}. Inside the city, its name is associated mostly with its success in the yearly Marchas Populares contest.

One of the twelve civil parishes created from the administrative reform of the city approved in February 1959 from lands belonging to Beato, Marvila and Penha de França, Alto do Pina would ultimately be merged with the neighbouring São João de Deus parish in the 2012 administrative reforms, to create a new territory named Areeiro. (Note: Save for a small exchange for territorial correction with Beato over the Técnico sporting field. The interactive map on this Wiki already has this change marked on its borders, despite only occurring in the 2012 reform.)

Local landmarks include the Fonte Luminosa (Glowing Fountain), where a major rally was held by the Portuguese Socialist Party during the post-revolutionary period of 1975, attacking the influence of the Portuguese Communist Party. Also located in Alto do Pina are the ruins of the vacation house of the consort king of Portugal Ferdinand II.

== Toponymy ==
Alto do Pina's name derives from an old farm estate called Quinta (or Arraial) do Pina, existing between the 18th century and the mid-1930s. It is called such after its owner, according to a document dated 1747, a Tomás de Pina. Leaving no descendents, it later passed to his nephew and in 1764 appears as the property of a Captain João Álvares de Pina e Mello. Its location is described as between the Cabeço de Alperche (Penha de França) and "Monte Coxo" (close to Olaias), near the Ladeira do Pina.

Indeed, in Duarte Fava's cartography from 1807 a road marked at the crest of the hill as "Arrayal do Pina" is visible vertically crossing what is now Rua Cristóvão Falcão in the top-right corner of the map. Later, in Silva Pinto's 1911 depiction, the road is staightened out to become the southern section of Rua Barão de Sabrosa with an considerably sized estate visible, in the same area of smaller edifices in Fava's depictions. A perpendicular road leading westbound to the valley in which Avenida Almirante Reis now travels can be seen in both, which would equate to the aforementioned Ladeira, of which now only remains a small dead-end street (Calçada da Ladeira). Both it and the estate are last seen in the 1940 municipal map, prior to the complete execution of the Alameda project.

The name came to represent the hill as well as the neighbourhoods on the L-shaped slope and crest of what is now the eastern half of Alameda, hence the selection of the civil parish name in 1959.

It must be noted however, a good portion of the area and indeed the one that is most recognised under this name - the Bairro do Alto do Pina - is outside the former freguesia's limits, in territory that belonged to São João, now Penha de França. In fact, under the drawn borders, the aforementioned estate described would be in this territory as it is just South of the border. Simultaneous to this fact, in the area of the former parish, it has lost usage in some parts to other toponyms in the area such as Alameda and Areeiro.

== History ==
=== Early history and city expansion ===
The first mentions of settlements in the area now known as Alto do Pina go back to the during the reign of King John I, Master of Avis (king of Portugal, 1385-1433), due to the existence of fertile land of quality for agriculture and nearby streams. Some estates would begin to appear and with the 1755 earthquake in the 18th century, it would become a sought after area by the noblemen and bourgeoisie of the city for their country homes, during the reconstruction of the city. In this period, its landscape would be characterised by these farms and homesteads, divided by sinuous country lanes, of which there are some vestigial traces in the landscape and local toponymy. In Duarte Fava's previously mentioned 1807 map, we can see where the civil parish lied was at that time marked by a fork in the road close to where Areeiro is today, where the "Estrada da Penha para a Quinta do Areeiro" (road from Penha to Quinta do Areeiro) met the Estrada de Sacavém, one of the main roads leading from the city. This stretch of road from Areeiro to Sacavém was, at the time and well into the 20th century, particularly notable for some of its taverns and inns which were renowned in the area.

The city's expansion toward the area began in the second half of the 19th century with the Industrial Revolution, however, it would take until the 20th century for the city to reach it. In October 1911, a local landowner named Joaquim Gonzalez Garrido gets approval to build a "workers village" (Vila Operária) at Quinta do Bacalhau, initially named after it and later called Bairro Garrido. Originally composed of single storey houses, it was municipalised in 1920 and later demolished for the Alameda project. (Note: As visible in photographs deposited at the Lisbon Photographic Archive) Adjacent to this was another project in motion in the early decades of the century, by the Sociedade "Bairro dos Aliados", named after the neighbourhood in question. At the end of the First Republic the first municipal controlled-costs neighbourhoods of its kind are conceptualised with one for the families of municipal workers being placed in Alto do Pina. However, this neighbourhood would only be complete during the start of the dictatorship, being built between 1927 and 1935 and would therefore be named Bairro Municipal Presidente Carmona. In 1928, an agreement between the municipality and the then owners of Quinta das Ameias sought to construct the Bairro Popular do Casal Vistoso, but this was never actualised.

=== Mid-20th century ===
After decades of planning and advances by the mid-1930s, one of the principal axes, Avenida Almirante Reis, reached what would become the civil parish of Alto do Pina with a review of its planning. It is during this period that the wide Alameda Dom Afonso Henriques is opened, on the western end crowned by an athenean-like hill of knowledge in Instituto Superior Técnico and in the other the "Luminous Fountain". Ahead of the city's expansion northward, a revision of the Almirante Reis plan was drawn in 1938, by the hand of architect Faria da Costa [pt], (Note: Also responsible for the design of the Bairro do Areeiro urbanization plan, known as "Urbanização da Zona Compreendida entre a Alameda D. Afonso Henriques e a Linha Férrea de Cintura" (Urbanization of the Area between Alameda D.Afonso Henriques and the Cintura Railway Line) between 1938 and 1946) in turn conceptualised within the overall early city plans by Étienne de Gröer [pt]. At the time, the project above Praça do Chile [pt][es] had already begun and expanding the city in this direction had only one major impediment, that being the connection to the previously executed Avenida Guerra Junqueiro. (Note: The avenue ends in the northwestern sector of Alameda, in its valley. It belonged to São João de Deus, now Areeiro)

While this western half of the new section would be devoted to a more upper-class setting, Alto do Pina's section would be a continuation of the style and more modest environment established southeast of Alameda, around the Arroios Market, which while they weren't built with any particular identity, later became known as Bairro dos Actores. Alto do Pina therefore keeps itself closer to the area's routes, housing citizens of a more popular nature. Despite this difference in construction, the westernmost city blocks leading from the avenue attempt to create no visual barrier or difference with the other side of Almirante Reis. The avenue was finally complete with the inauguration of the Areeiro square in 1943 and would continue its axis onward towards the recently built Lisbon Airport. Also notable in this time period is the fact that a considerable amount of the wave of public works of the 1930s and 40s in the Estado Novo have their origin precisely in Alto do Pina and Areeiro, through the various sand quarries in the northern areas of the parish territory, in particularly at Quinta da Montanha, the effects of which were still visible in the early 2000s, namely Alameda's Fonte Luminosa.

At the end of the 1940s, a new urban plan was also created, though it was never formally approved by the central government. Among many of its introductions for the modern, post-Second War European city of 1948 would be the creation of several circular roads, though this idea was largely unfollowed. The territory of Alto do Pina would contend with two, the 3rd and 4th Circulars. The third, projected to connect the Benfica Radial [pt] at Sete Rios to the port at Beato would end up theoretically intersecting the civil parish of Alto do Pina as its northeastern border and the fourth, between Alcântara and Xabregas, would cross the civil parish in Areeiro and the crest of the hill, in what is now Avenida Afonso Costa. Neither project would be complete eastward in its original form beyond Alto do Pina.

By the mid-20th century, the city had consolidated most of the land around its two main axes (Liberdade/República and Almirante Reis) and this meant that management of these new city areas had to differ from how it had been conducted until that point, leading to the administrative reorganization of 1959, in which the freguesia of Alto do Pina is created. Duarte Pacheco and the regime's idealized Lisbon had grown significantly in size during its period, but the city's growth and attractiveness had also led to the creation of many clandestine neighbourhoods or shanty towns, which were a notable phenomena in the two major urban areas during the 1960s and 1970s. The Pina hillcrest, which had not seen construction as an area in the direct cusp of the city centre became an attractive area for these areas to grow - Casal Vistoso, Quinta do Bacalhau and Monte Coxo on the Vale da Montanha hillside were all notable examples of the period. Simultaneously, further along the hillside, Alto do Pina's out-of-parish-southern arm would border one of the most prominent cases, Quinta da Curraleira [pt] which would only be resolved in the new millennium. Other projects were still completed in this period, nonetheless, as is the case of the Bairro da GNR, which was inaugurated in 1966.

=== Late-20th century and the new millennium ===
After the Carnation Revolution in 1974, the face of Alto do Pina would change significantly as the opposite hillside finally started to gain formal construction from the 1970s onward. During the transitory governments, one of the principal preocupations was that of housing through several mechanisms, alongside the pre-existing FFH (Housing Promotion Fund, Fundo de Fomento da Habitação, 1969-1982). One of the novelties was that of the short-lived SAAL[pt] which helped execute self-construction initiatives allied to many known and upcoming architects. In the civil parish, an association proposed and got approval for the Portugal Novo neighbourhood, which was meant to clean up Monte Coxo and the Quinta do Bacalhau situation.

== Geography ==
Alto do Pina is located at the edge of what is traditionally considered central Lisbon, although during its existence as a civil parish, it was part of the 4th Administrative District (bairro administrativo) of the city and therefore grouped with the eastern parishes. Its territory was bordered to the west by São João de Deus, to the north-west by Alvalade, to the north-east by Marvila, to the south-east by São João and to the south by São Jorge de Arroios.

Strictly speaking, it was delimited in Alameda Dom Afonso Henriques to the South; Avenida Almirante Reis, Areeiro and Avenida Almirante Gago Coutinho to the West with a slight detour after the Cintura Line. Its northern/north-eastern border would have been the 3rd circular as per the Urbanization Plan of 1948, but this was never built, and to the south-east on its access to Olaias, though this once again was not executed and therefore crossed Avenida Carlos Pinhão, before reaching Rua Aquiles Machado, Calçada da Picheleira, Rotunda das Olaias and Rua Cristóvão Falcão.

Meanwhile, it should be noted, the Bairro do Alto do Pina, effectively the southern arm of the area, in what was formerly São João is roughly situated between Rua Barão de Sabrosa, Avenida Morais Soares and Rua Engenheiro Santos Simões.

=== Physical geography ===
Located at one of the north-eastern corners of central Lisbon, as the name suggests it is perched atop a hill, here curved from the south to the north-west of the civil parish territory, with its respective slopes leading into two valleys which consequently mark its territory - the Arroios Valley (Note: Sometimes also referred to as Vale da (Avenida) Almirante Reis after the avenue goes along it.) in its south-west corner, to which the inclines concentrate on to form the Alameda in the civil parish; and, the Areeiro Valley (also known at points as Vale da Montanha, literally Mountain Valley) to the north and east. This physical feature which in turn leads into the Chelas Valley forms, in its beginning, the basis for Avenida Almirante Gago Coutinho and in its steeper section where the Cintura railway line runs.

Geomorphologically speaking the civil parish is located on the edges of the larger Tagus-Sado meso-cenozoic basin and is present on the Geological Map of Portugal as composed by rocks of a sedimentary nature - "conglomerates, sandstones, biocalcarenites, siltstones and mudstones" - originating in the Miocene epoch. In the more detailed Geological Map of Lisbon, it becomes the notable that the hill in which Alto do Pina is located is composed of several different sedimentary layers, aside its alluvial nature in its two defining valleys.

=== Human geography ===
The area of the freguesia of Alto do Pina is primarily composed by its homonymous area, Casal Vistoso as well as parts of the areas of Alameda, Areeiro and Olaias; which can collectively have sub-neighbourhoods present (in portuguese equally called bairros):

Alto do Pina

- Bairro dos Actores/Atores (Norte/northern section) - Collective name of the two neighbourhoods that sandwich Alameda, of which the northern one belongs to Alto do Pina. The section within the civil parish is framed by Rua Actriz Virgínia to the north, Rua Actor João Rosa, Rua Casimiro Freire and Rua João de Menezes to the east; Alameda to the south and Avenida Almirante Reis to the west. Its name comes from the fact that a good portion of the streets are named after actors, though when it was projected in 1932, there was no intention of an identity being part of a larger plan to expand the city northward. It is notable for its art deco style, typical of its building period.
- Bairro dos Aliados - Neighbourhood east of Bairro dos Actores and west of Rua Barão de Sabrosa. Constructed on a part of the old Quinta do Bacalhau estate by the Sociedade Bairro dos Aliados, it was planned in the 1910s and executed in the following years. Its name like others in the city are a result of a wave of post-First World War names.
- Bairro Capitão Galvão (until 1975, Bairro [Municipal] Presidente Carmona) - Composed solely of the city block centered around Rua Capitão Henrique Galvão, it is an early attempt as social housing with controlled costs, meant for the families of Lisbon municipal workers, executed 1927-1935. Shortly after the revolution, its name was changed in honour of Captain Henrique Galvão to distance itself from the regime, though the name didn't stick. Due to its minuscule size, it is a name disappearing from the city map and consciousness.
- Bairro da G.N.R./"da Guarda" (ao Alto do Pina) - Mid-20th-century buildings inaugurated in 1966 for the 55th anniversary of the Guard. Mostly five storeys high, between Rua Barão de Sabrosa and Azinhaga Fonte do Louro, south of Rua Egas Moniz, designed by architect Vasco Regaleira [pt]. Named such after its original composition, families of National Republican Guard officers.

Alameda - area directly around the tree-lined Alameda D.Afonso Henriques and prior to the administrative reform, an area shared between four civil parishes.

Areeiro and Casal Vistoso - Areeiro is at the crest of the aforementioned plateau, marked by an originally homonymous square (now Praça Francisco Sá Carneiro) crowning the Avenida Almirante Reis axis and prior to reform was shared with São João de Deus, before they fused into a civil parish of this name.

Olaias

- Bairro das Olaias (northern part - Encosta das Olaias) - located south and southeast of Rua Américo Durão up to the civil parish border and centered on Avenida Engenheiro Arantes e Oliveira. The section of Olaias within the civil parish is also known and was originally marketed as "(Conjunto Habitacional da) Encosta das Olaias". Designed by local architect Tomás Taveira, they follow the contour lines of the territory and are marked by his now-recognisable multi-coloured façades. It was awarded the municipal Prémio Valmor [pt] in 1982.
- Bairro Portugal Novo - sometimes but rarely still also recognised under the name Monte Coxo (Note: Which was formerly alternatively known as Quinta do Coxo, da Coxa or Quinta de José Coxo. The name "Quinta do Monte Coxo" appears in mid-century municipal cartography dated 1970.. Also recognised/referred to as Bairro SAAL da Quinta do Bacalhau.), an older name toponym falling into disuse, it consists of the group of buildings surrounded by Rua Al Berto and Rua Américo Durão, next to Casal Vistoso and "behind" Avenida Engenheiro Arantes e Oliveira. Originating in the ambitious post-revolution SAAL[pt] housing scheme by the Portugal Novo Cooperative, to resolve the shack problem in the area, with a project drawn by architect Manuel Vicente [pt]. Its construction was plagued by several issues leading to an incomplete execution and legalization and by the late 1980s what had been built was entering a state of disrepair and marginalization. In the 1990s, the municipality through their housing company Gebalis sought to complete the implantation of housing areas, although not according to the original plan. The situation worsened in the original neighbourhood and became a situation of growing concern for the municipality, which in the 21st century has tried to take measures to remediate the situation. In 2017, a petition asking for the municipalization of the area was approved for discussion at the municipal assembly and by 2021, the national Council of Ministers announced its regularization. In 2025, the municipality announced a contest for a "New Portugal Novo", with the purpose of urban rehabilitation and resolution of the original neighbourhood's issues. The neighbourhood can effectively be subdivided in three spaces - the central cooperative-era buildings and the 1990s «Bairro(s) Gebalis das Olaias» in the two northernmost blocks and the southernmost corner block. Overall, the neighbourhoods are characterised by considerable diversity and its history, as well as the civil parishes as a whole have made it a base for several municipal and social service institutions.

== Demographics ==
Historical population of Alto do Pina
Year	1960	1970	1981	1991	2001	2011
Pop.	12,570	10,594	13,110	12,654	10,253	10,333
±%	—	−15.7%	+23.7%	−3.5%	−19.0%	+0.8%
Source: INE

At the time of the last census prior to the administrative reorganization, Alto do Pina had a population of 10,333, a slight growth from the value ten years prior contrary to the city as a whole. In its time as a civil parish, the value fluctuated highly, reaching its peak in the 1981 census.

== Politics and Administration ==
The civil parish created in 1959 had its former seat on Rua Abade Faria, 37; a corner building on the crossing with Rua Egas Moniz. After its extinction in 2012, it continues to be used for local government as a delegation of the new Areeiro civil parish. The name "Alto do Pina" is still noticeable on the façade through some tilework above the door.

In elections, which were run from 1976 at a local level, four parties participated in all ten editions of local elections - PCP (under different coalitions), PS, PPD/PSD and CDS-PP. Although in the first edition the centre-left Socialist Party won the election, from the following election in 1979 onward the civil parish, was won by PSD or a PSD-led coalition. Participation while strong in the late 1970s and 1980s, peaking with a 70 per cent turnout in 1982 in what was one of the most closely contested elections in the civil parish, later fell to under half the electorate by 1993 and revolved close to the half-way mark until its extinction in 2012.

Full summary of local elections for Alto do Pina
Election	CDS-PP	PPD/ PSD	PPM	MPT	MDP	FEPU/ APU/ CDU	PS	UDP	PSR	BE	PCTP-MRPP	GDUPs	I/B	Turnout
1976	22.40	17.44			FEPU	15.98	36.45				1.02	4.40	2.29	49.48
1979	56.29				APU	20.29	21.97						1.44	65.24
1982	22.50	27.02			APU	20.51	25.72						4.25	70.20
1985	15.05	31.86			APU	20.12	18.05	1.24					3.67	56.62
1989	53.86				39.56			1.65					5.10	51.38
1993	9.29	43.84				43.27							3.30	43.27
1997	54.21					40.00							5.79	48.26
2001	7.82	52.19				31.96				4.57			3.45	49.48
2005	6.89	47.89				8.85	24.69			7.50			4.13	48.67
2009	50.36					7.86	32.76			5.36			3.66	48.96
Source: SGMAI

== Heraldry ==
The heraldic arms of Alto do Pina were approved in 2004. They consist of «a shield or, with a heraldic fountain between three trusses gules in chief, displayed in a row and a mound vert, firm and shifting from the tip. Mural crown argent of three towers, with the legend in sable "ALTO DO PINA".» The flag consists of a blue field with the arms in its centre.

The heraldic fountain is meant to depict the Fonte Luminosa, treated as the ex-libris of the parish and the mound represents the name "Alto do Pina". The three trusses here are a representation of what are considered to be the three population nuclei of the parish - first, the Bairro dos Actores, Alameda, Avenida Almirante Reis and Areeiro; second Olaias, Avenida Afonso Costa and Casal Vistoso; and thirdly the neighbourhoods originally built as social housing such as Bairro Portugal Novo and Alto da Pina itself.

== Heritage ==
=== Local landmarks ===
- Casa dos Plátanos - Rua Barão de Sabrosa, 271 (1921, expanded 1958 in project by Ressano Garcia [pt]. Currently houses children's early educational and social assistance services)
- Church of the Holy Twelve Apostles and of their Queen (Igreja dos Santos Doze Apóstolos e da Sua Rainha) - Rua Barão de Sabrosa, 221 (projected 1939, Arq.º Raúl Tojal [pt]. Former parochial church of Alto do Pina)
- Monumental or Luminous Fountain of Alameda [pt] (Fonte Luminosa ou Monumental da Alameda) (1939-1948, architect Carlos Rebello de Andrade [pt], sculptures Diogo de Macedo and Maximiano Alves, relief work Jorge Barradas, hydraulic work Carles Buïgas. Executed both for the commemorations of the 1940 Centenaries as well as completion of the Tagus channel, which secured a safe and stable water supply to the city. It features representations of the Tagus and its lyrical nymphs - the Tágides [pt] - and at the time of its inauguration was considered the largest fountain in Europe.) (Note: Shared with the civil parish of São João, now Penha de França)
- Monument to Afonso Costa - (Inaugurated 1994, Pedro Ramos, concrete and bronze; consists of an abstract sculpture over a small reflecting pool. Located in a small "island" garden in the middle of the avenue of the same name,)
- Monument to Francisco Sá Carneiro, Areeiro - (Inaugurated 1991, project execution Soares Branco [pt]. Built by public subscription in the square also rebaptised in his honour.) (Note: Shared with the civil parish of São João de Deus, with which it fused to become to Areeiro)
- Olaias Station (1998, architect Tomás Taveira, plastic interventions Tomás Taveira, Pedro Cabrita Reis, Graça Pereira Coutinho, Rui Sanchez, Pedro Calapez and António Paiolo. Red line-Lisbon Metro station renowned for its colourful tilework, play with light and artwork.) (Note: Shared with the civil parish of Beato)
- Ruins of Casal Vistoso or Quinta das Ameias (Ruínas do Casal Vistoso ou Quinta das Ameias) (Ruins of the main building of a 17th century estate that at one point was supposedly the country house of Ferdinand II and the Countess of Edla. Abandoned at some point in the second half of the 20th century. Located on Avenida Afonso Costa, near Areeiro.)

=== In the neighbourhood, but not the civil parish ===
Although this article centres on the civil parish, this list attempts to also mention places of local relevance in the Bairro do Alto do Pina:

- Church of St.John, the Evangelist (Igreja de São João Evangelista) - Rua Barão de Sabrosa, 21 (Inaugurated late 20th c., adapted from a former cinema, Max-Cine/Cine Oriente, projected by Jacinto Bettencourt and Deolindo Vieira, opened 1931. Former parochial church of São João)
- Fountain of Alto do Pina (Chafariz do Alto do Pina) - crossing of Rua Sabino de Sousa and Rua 4 de Agosto. (Small 20th c. fountain)
