= Instituto Nacional de Estatística (Portugal) =

Portuguese government institution

Statistics Portugal
- Instituto Nacional de Estatística, I.P.
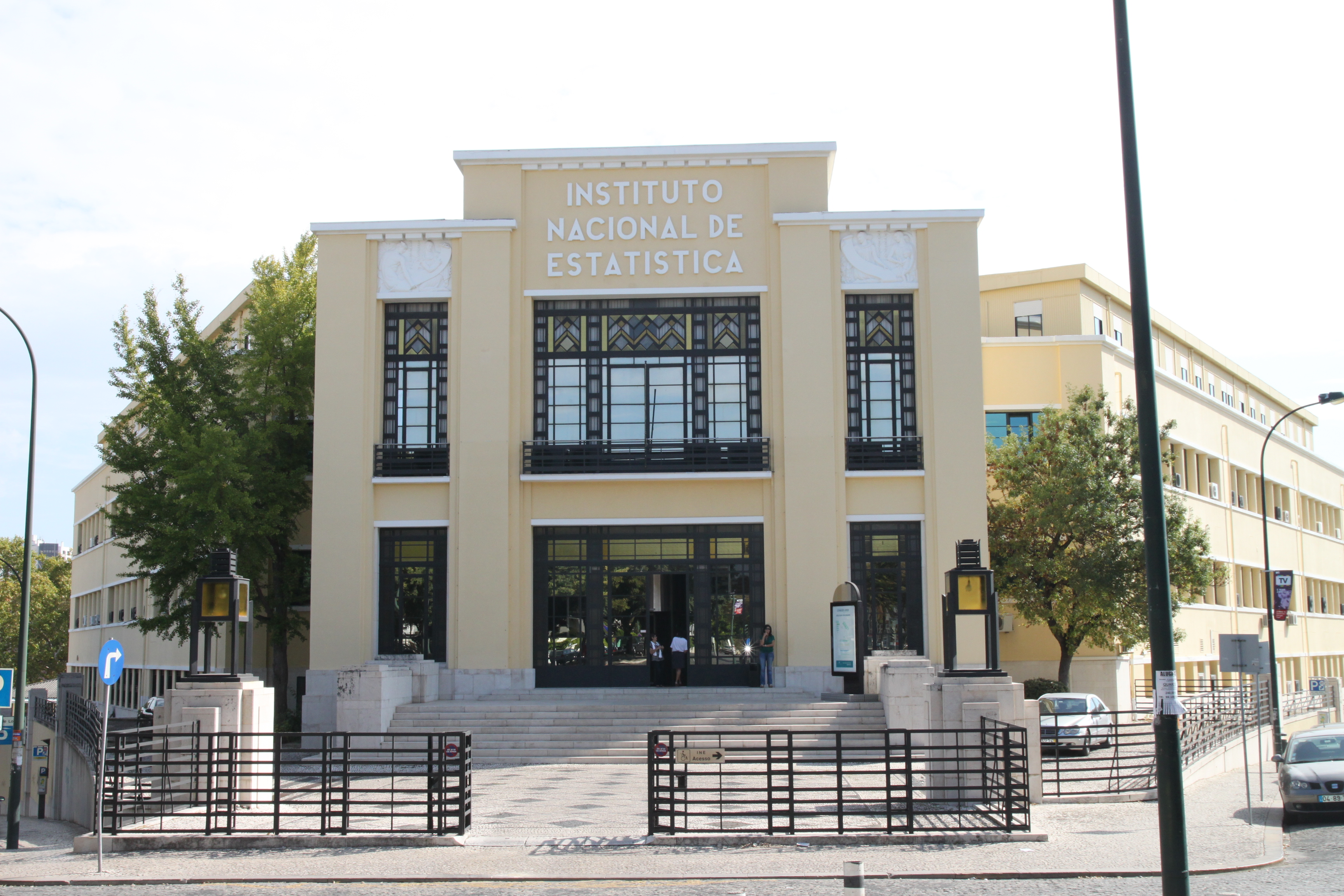
- The INE building with its art deco style, in the civil parish of Areeiro, central Lisbon

Institute overview
- Formed: 23 May 1935 (91 years ago)
- Type: Public institute with special regime
- Jurisdiction: Portugal
- Headquarters: Avenida António José de Almeida, Lisbon; 38°44′19″N 9°08′16″W
- Employees: 687 (2026)
- Annual budget: € 53.013 million (2026)
- Institute executive: António Rua, President
- Parent institute: Government of Portugal, National Statistics System, Eurostat
- Website: ine.pt

The Instituto Nacional de Estatística or INE (Portuguese for "National Institute for Statistics"), also branded as Statistics Portugal in English, is the government institute for national statistics of Portugal.

INE is one of the components of the portuguese National Statistical System [pt] (SEN, Sistema de Estatística Nacional), which also includes the Higher Council of Statistics (CSE), the Bank of Portugal and the regional statistical services of the autonomous regions of the Azores and Madeira. It is a public institute with its own special regime and is therefore not under any specific unit of the State although it does respond directly to the Presidency of the Council of Ministers. Furthermore, it is directly represented in the Social and Economic Council (CES) [pt] of Portugal and its operations integrate the Eurostat european statistics framework system.

INE is based out of Lisbon, having four regional delegations in each of the remaining territories outside the Lisbon region - Porto (Edifício Scala - North), Coimbra (Casa das Andorinhas - Centre), Évora (Alentejo) and Faro (Algarve).

The name "Instituto Nacional de Estatística" and the corresponding acronym "INE" is also used as the designation of the central statistical services of several other countries of the Community of Portuguese Language Countries, such as Angola [pt], Cape Verde, Guinea-Bissau [pt], Mozambique [pt] and São Tomé and Príncipe.

== History ==
The first population census known to be done in what is known as Portugal today was conducted in the year 1 AD by order of the roman emperor Caesar Augustus, covering the province of Lusitania. After the foundation of the independent Portugal, many censuses were conducted, one of the first relevant known being the Roll of the Crossbowmen done in the 13th century by order of King Afonso III.

During the 19th century, the statistical study of the territory would become more formal and regular. In 1815, the Commission for Statistics and Registry of the Realm (CECR, Comissão de Estatística e Cadastro do Reino), which would later become a permanent structure in 1836 as the CPECR. It would be in this period that the first modern census in Portugal, done according to the scientific methodology established by the First International Statistical Congress, was carried out in 1864. The second census would be published in 1878 and from 1890 onward takes place in regular intervals.

With the Implantation of the Republic in 1910, the CPECR was replaced in 1911 by the Direcção-Geral de Estatística ('Directorate-General for Statistics'), which would last until its restructuring into the current INE on 23 May 1935.

== Products ==
INE's work consists in the production and treatment of statistical data and indicators. Aside from its indicators and census and related reports, it also publishes the REVSTAT journal (short for REVista eSTATística).

The institution's main and most well known product are the decennial census (censos/recenseamentos). As previously stated, the country's first modern census occurred in 1864, but only in 1890 would it begin to happen as a regularly scheduled event. In 1981, it shifted to years finishing in one - the last recorded census was in 2021, with the next expected to fall in 2031. Parallel to the demographic census, INE also performs the housing census since 1960. This information is typically presented through municipal and freguesia levels and later as part of the EU statistics framework through NUTS, has its most vital statistics presented in several other ways.

Through the BGRI (Base Geográfica de Referenciação de Informação, Geograhic Base for Information Referencing - originally BGRE, "...de Referenciação Estatística"). Since 1991, basic information is also made available through even more detailed statistical sectors and subsectors within the civil parishes. Data can also be find via square kilometre GRIDs and through "lugares estatísticos" (statistical localities, or, settlements). This data presentation allows some approximation to the proper areas of settlements, although as of the 2021 model, this interpretation should be handled with care as these may be frequently divided into smaller settlements (for example, the Viana do Castelo settlement only accounts for the historic city centre) or continuous areas may be grouped together as one settlement (Matosinhos and Leça da Palmeira, as a clear example).

Related to statistical information in Portugal is the DICOFRE code system (Distrito + Concelho + Freguesia, also referred to as DTMNFR - Distrito, Município, Freguesia - by the Directorate-General of the Territory) which gives every single territory a specific code. The code is composed of a set of six digits, two for districts, two for municipalities and two for civil parishes; the three typical levels of administrations in the country. The first two digits, equivalent to the districts, are shared with the ISO 3166-2:PT entry, civil parishes both before and after the 2012-13 reorganization have distinct numbers and all entries are organized alphabetically within the territory level directly above. For example, the civil parish of Areeiro in Lisbon, where INE headquarters are located, has the Dicofre 110655 (district 11, municipality 06, civil parish 55) - prior to reorganization, it fell within São João de Deus which was 110643.

There is a third census, the agricultural census (recenseamento {or censos} agrário). Although its roots trace back to the middle of the century, it first officially happened in 1989 and has occurred in years ending in nine since, with the last edition occurring in 2019.

== Headquarters ==
INE is installed in an Art Deco building, designed specifically to serve as its headquarters by architect Porfírio Pardal Monteiro in 1931. Construction began in 1932, with the building opening in 1935. Being a landmark of early 20th-century Portuguese modernist architecture, INE's headquarters was classified as a public interest monument in 2013.

== See also ==
- Eurostat, the European statistics agency of which INE is a part of
- Office for National Statistics, the British statistics office
- Instituto Brasileiro de Geografia e Estatística, the Brazilian statistics institute
- Instituto Nacional de Estatística (Cape Verde)
- Instituto Nacional de Estatística (São Tomé and Príncipe)
