= Igreja de Santo Estêvão (Lisbon) =

Church in Lisbon, Portugal

Coordinates: 38°42′44″N 9°07′41″W

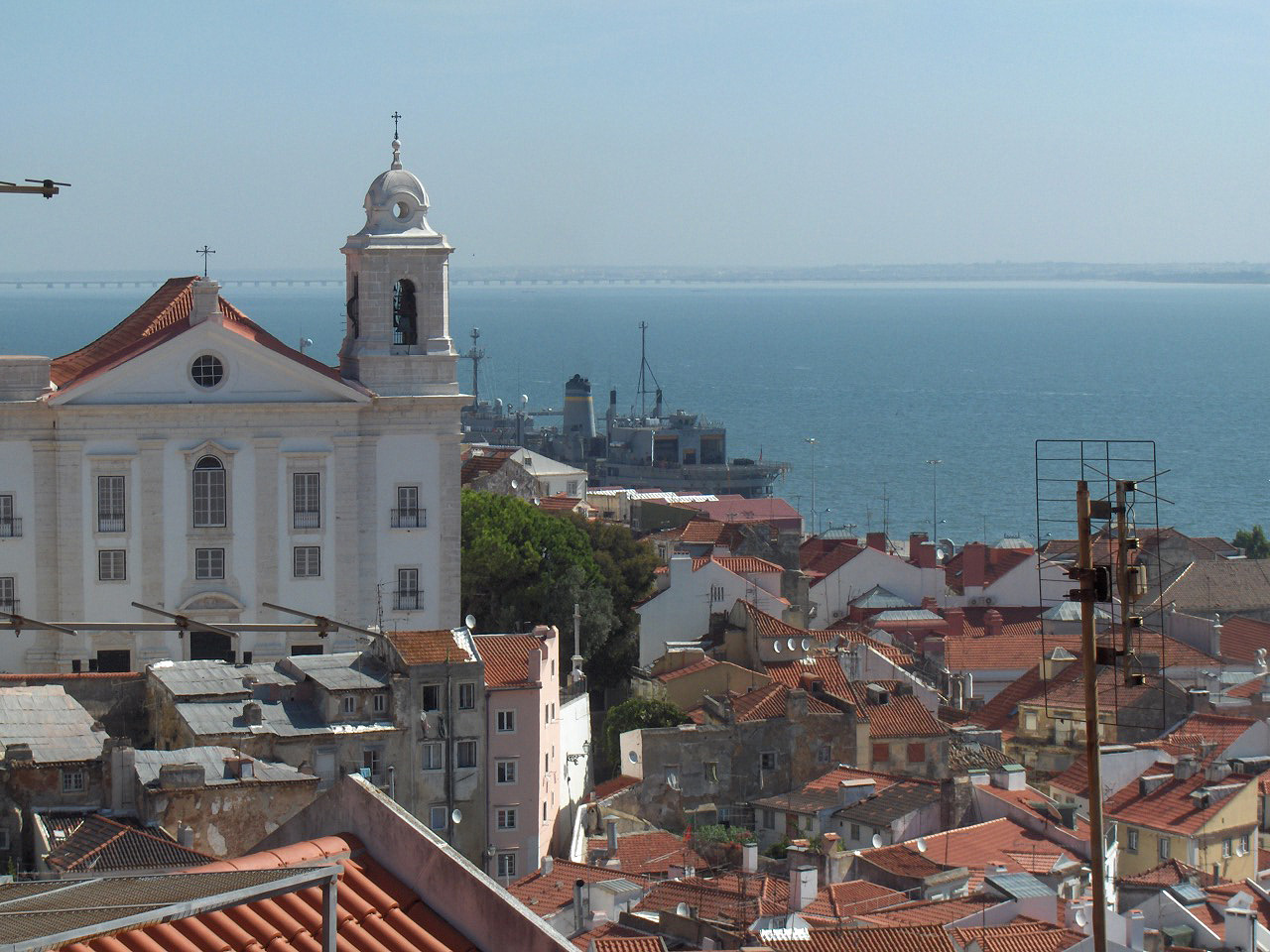
- View of the main façade of the church.

Religion
- Affiliation: Roman Catholic
- Diocese: Lisbon District
- Region: Lisboa Region
- Rite: Latin Rite

Location
- Location: Rua do espirito 16, Lisbon, 1100, Portugal .
- Municipality: Lisbon
- Interactive map of Igreja de Santo Estêvão

Architecture
- Style: Baroque
- Completed: 1833

Saint Stephen Church (Portuguese: Igreja de Santo Estêvão) is a church in Alfama district of Lisbon, Portugal. It is classified as a National Monument.

== History ==
The Santo Estêvão Church of the 12th century was reconstructed in 1733 in Baroque style by the architect Manuel da Costa Negreiros. After being damaged by 1755 Lisbon earthquake, the church was renovated, and reopened in 1773. It was classified as National Monument in 1918 according to the Decree № 5 046.

== Overview ==
The church is in rectangular shape. Its facade is divided into 3 parts by pilasters. The central one was crowned by a triangular pediment, surmounted with a cross and framed with 2 towers. One of the towers was destroyed as the result of the earthquake. Interior part of the Church is composed of main altar with a stone altarpiece along with wood ornaments and gold leaf alter, a group of sculptures carved by Jose de Almeida, side altars, statuary, and the tiles of old sacristy.

== See also ==
- List of churches in Portugal
- List of National Monuments of Portugal
