= Marchas Populares =

Portuguese traditional event

The Marchas Populares (Popular Marches) are a Portuguese tradition that dates back to 1932, when the first event took place in the capital city of Lisbon, under the direction of Leitão de Barros. It is one of several events that take place in the month of June as a celebration of the Portuguese Midsummer.

The Marchas are typically held at night, in the eve of a religious holiday. They consist of a thematic competition between teams that dress up with handmade outfits to march and dance through an open avenue or closed arena to the sound of popular music, mixing motifs of Portuguese summer culture, like "manjerico" and the sea. The participants of the several teams are usually residents of a certain neighbourhood, students, or members of a local organization.

== Marchas Populares de Lisboa ==
Although the Marchas are held at many towns and villages of Portugal, the most famous competition is the Marchas Populares de Lisboa, taking place each year during the official city holiday of St. Anthony, the Patron Saint of Lisbon, from the night of 12 June through 13 June. All districts of Lisbon become rivals for one night and compete for the podium of the contest, that is broadcast live on national television from the famous Avenida da Liberdade. The teams are sponsored by godparents, who are mediatic figures of the country or of the city of Lisbon. Some teams, like the child march of Voz do Operário, participate in the event as pure guests, and do not engage in the competition, that takes place exclusively among the neighbourhoods. During this night, the residents of the several districts of Lisbon typically go out to party in the street with friends and other residents, eating grilled sardines and drinking beer to the sound of Portuguese music. The Marchas de Lisboa form an iconic cultural duo with the Casamentos de Santo António (Weddings of Saint Anthony), that are hold during the morning and afternoon of 12 June. Like the Marchas, the civil and catholic weddings are also broadcast on national television. The married couples of the ceremony also participate in the Marches by walking through the Avenue.

Although the official showcase and event happens on 12 June, the preparation for the Marches starts months before, for the teams to design and practice their performance. A common misconception is that the judge does not score the teams during the Marches per se; instead, the voting process is held a few days earlier, with a private show held at a closed stadium like Altice Arena.

=== Podium of the Marchas Populares de Lisboa ===
The podium of the several editions of the Marchas Populares was the following:

Year	Podium		
Year	1st	2nd	3rd
1990	Alfama	Castelo	Marvila
1991	Madragoa	Alfama	Carnide
1992	Bica	Alfama	Madragoa
1993	Alfama	Campolide	Marvila
1994	Madragoa	Alcântara	Campolide
1995	Marvila	Madragoa	Bairro Alto
1996	Alfama	São Vicente	Marvila
1997	Alfama	Castelo e São Vicente ("ex-aequo")	—
1998	Alfama	Marvila	Madragoa
1999	Alfama	Marvila	Castelo
2000	Alfama	Marvila	Castelo
2001	Marvila	Alfama	Bica
2002	Marvila	Castelo	Bica
2003	Bica	Alfama	Mouraria
2004	Alfama	Alcântara	Madragoa
2005	Alfama	Mouraria	Madragoa
2006	Alfama	Madragoa	Alcântara
2007	Alfama	Marvila	Campolide
2008	Marvila	Alfama	Madragoa
2009	Alfama e Castelo (ex-aequo)	—	Madragoa e Marvila (ex-aequo)
2010	Alfama	Marvila	Bica
2011	Alto do Pina	Alfama	Madragoa
2012	Alto do Pina	Alfama	Alcântara
2013	Alfama	Alto do Pina	Bica
2014	Alfama	Alcântara	Bairro Alto
2015	Alto do Pina	Alfama	Alcântara
2016	Alfama	Penha de França	Alto do Pina
2017	Alfama	Bairro Alto	Madragoa
2018	Alfama	Bairro Alto	Madragoa
2019	Alto do Pina	Alfama	Penha de França
2020	In 2020 there were no Marches due to the COVID-19 pandemic		
2021	In 2021 there were no Marches due to the COVID-19 pandemic		
2022	Madragoa	Alcântara	Alto do Pina
2023	Bica	Bairro Alto	Alfama

==== Top places by neighbourhood ====
The following table shows the number of top places achieved by each district, from 1990 to 2023.

Neighbourhood	1st	2nd	3rd
Alfama	18	9	1
Marvila	4	5	4
Alto do Pina	4	1	2
Madragoa	3	2	9
Bica	4	–	4
Castelo	1	3	2
Alcântara	–	4	3
Bairro Alto	–	3	2
São Vicente	–	2	–
Campolide	–	1	2
Mouraria	–	1	1
Penha de França	–	1	1
Carnide	–	–	1
