= Areeiro =

Areeiro may refer to:

- Areeiro, Lisbon, a civil parish of Lisbon, Portugal
- Praça do Areeiro, former name of Praça Francisco Sá Carneiro, a square in Lisbon, Portugal
- Roma-Areeiro railway station, in Lisbon, Portugal
- Areeiro (Lisbon Metro) - a station of the Lisbon Metro
- Areeiro, Caparica, a neighbourhood of the parish of Caparica, Almada, Portugal
