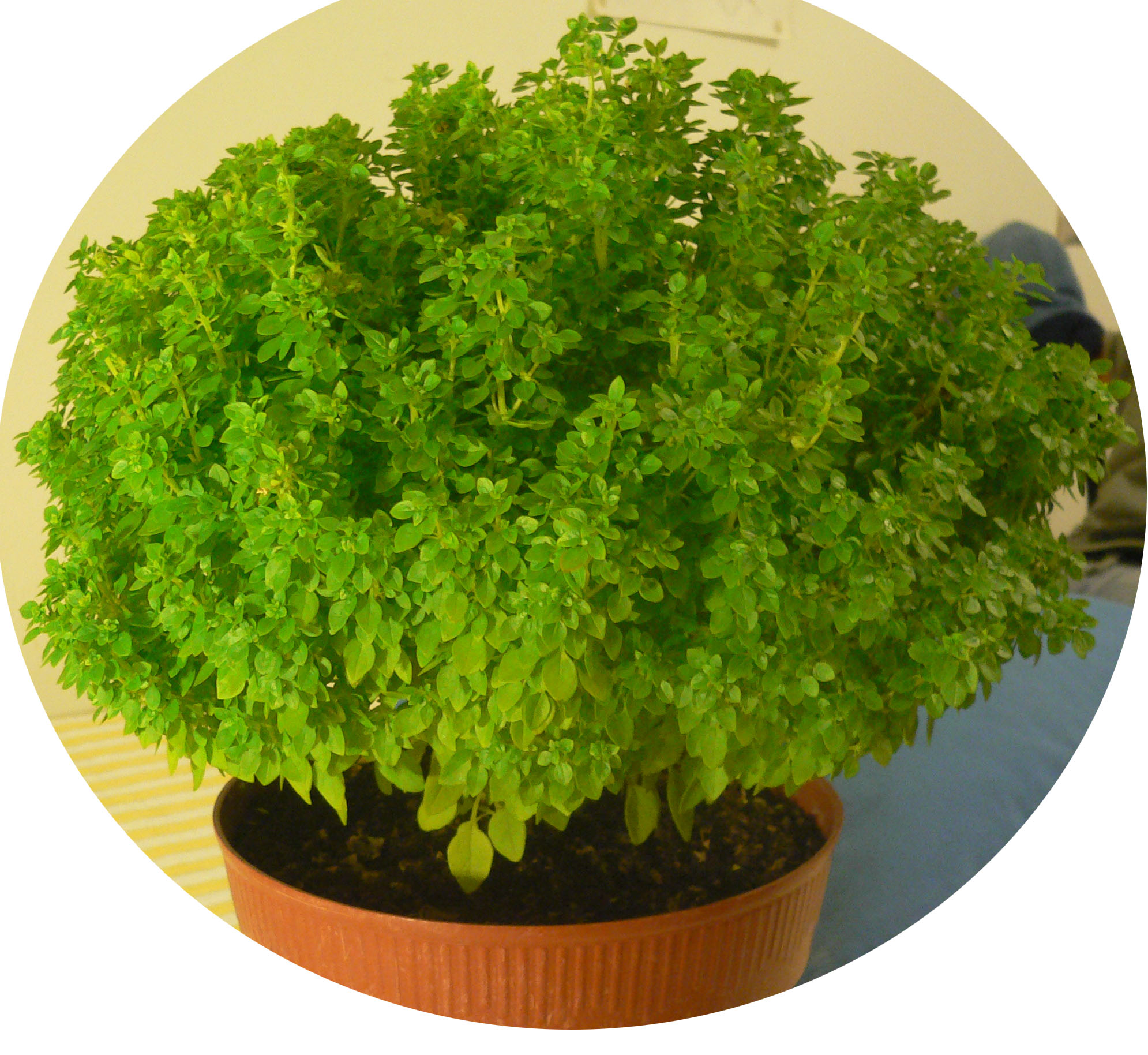

Scientific classification
- Kingdom: Plantae
- Clade: Tracheophytes
- Clade: Angiosperms
- Clade: Eudicots
- Clade: Asterids
- Order: Lamiales
- Family: Lamiaceae
- Genus: Ocimum
- Species: O. minimum

Binomial name
- Ocimum minimum L., 1753

= Ocimum minimum =

Species of flowering plant

Ocimum minimum is a species of plant in the family Lamiaceae. It is sometimes referred to as bush basil in reference to the way this perennial grows.

== Portugal ==
In Portuguese this plant is known as manjerico. In Portugal, it is an iconic figure of the country, widely sold in stores or in street fairs during the month of June due to the celebration of the Portuguese Midsummer, that goes by the name of Santos Populares. It is often a motif of Marchas Populares. Traditionally, the manjerico was bought by men as a gift to their lovers. The plant usually comes in a small flowerpot featuring a paper flower and a paper flag with a written poem, either dedicated to somebody or praising a specific town or holiday, or with verses featuring a humorous, provocative meaning.

The plant is praised for its characteristic pleasant smell. The cultural impact of manjerico is well depicted in Portuguese art, such as in poems by Fernando Pessoa or in fados by Amália Rodrigues.
