= National Institute of Statistics (Mozambique) =

Mozambique's principal government institution in charge of statistics and census data

- Instituto Nacional de Estatística

Agency overview
- Formed: August 28, 1996; 29 years ago
- Jurisdiction: Government of Mozambique
- Headquarters: Maputo, Mozambique; 25.967489°S 32.575914°E
- Agency executives: Maria Isaltina de Sales Lucas, President; Manuel da Costa Gaspar, Vice-presidente para o Pelouro Demográfico
- Parent agency: Cabinet of Mozambique
- Website: www.ine.gov.mz

The National Institute of Statistics (Portuguese: Instituto Nacional de Estatística, INE) is an agency belonging to the Government of Mozambique and the principal agency for the collection of statistics in the country. It was created under Presidential Decree nº 9/96, of August 28, 1996.
