= Beato =

Beato is a surname. Notable people with the surname include:

- Affonso Beato (born 1941), Brazilian cinematographer
- Antonio Beato (1835–1906), British-Italian photographer, brother of Felice
- Carmen Beato (born 1966), Mexican actress
- Felice Beato (1832–1909), British-Italian photographer
- Felice A. Beato, collective signature used by brothers Felice and Antonio Beato, pioneering photographers
- Gerónimo Beato (born 1995), Uruguayan footballer
- Pedro Beato (born 1986), Dominican baseball player
- Rick Beato (born 1962), American musician
