= Instituto Nacional de Estatística (Cape Verde) =

Cape Verde's national public statistics institute

The Instituto Nacional de Estatística (Portuguese for the National Statistics Institute, abbreviated as INE) is the public statistics institute of Cape Verde. Its current president is Osvaldo Rui Monteiro dos Reis Borges. The population censuses are held every first year of a decade; the most recent was in 2010. Its main office is on 18 Rua da Caixa Económica in the capital city of Praia.

== History ==
Until 1975, under Portuguese rule, statistics were done by the Provincial Statistics Bureau (Repartição Provincial de Estatística), part of the Instituto Nacional de Estatística of Portugal. When Cape Verde became independent, the Serviço Nacional de Estatística (SNE, Portuguese for the National Statistics Service) was established, part of the Ministry of Economy. Its first president was Edgard Chrysostome Pinto. At the end of 1985, the Directorate-General of Statistics was created. In 1996, the new law of the National Statistics System was approved, and the Istituto Nacional de Estatística (INE) was created under the direction of Francisco Fernandes Tavares.
