= António Palolo =

Portuguese artist and painter (1946–2000)

António Palolo (1946–2000) was a Portuguese artist and painter.

== Biography ==
Palolo was born in Évora in 1946. He held his first one-person exhibition in 1964 at 111 Gallery, Lisbon, with great success. His early works were closely connected to the Pop idiom, mingling figurative and geometric elements.

In the 1970s, he changed into a rigorous type of abstraction where he came closer than ever to the minimalist program; simultaneously, he expanded his art practice into experimental film, performance and video.

In the 1980s, Palolo's work briefly followed the international return to figurative expressionist painting; and in his final mode he synthesized the geometric structure of his 1970s painting with the subtlety of color and texture experienced in the eighties.

In 1995, Palolo held a large retrospective exhibition at the Modern Art Centre, Calouste Gulbenkian Foundation, Lisbon. He died in 2000 in Lisbon.
