= Areeiro, Lisbon =

Areeiro
- Civil parish
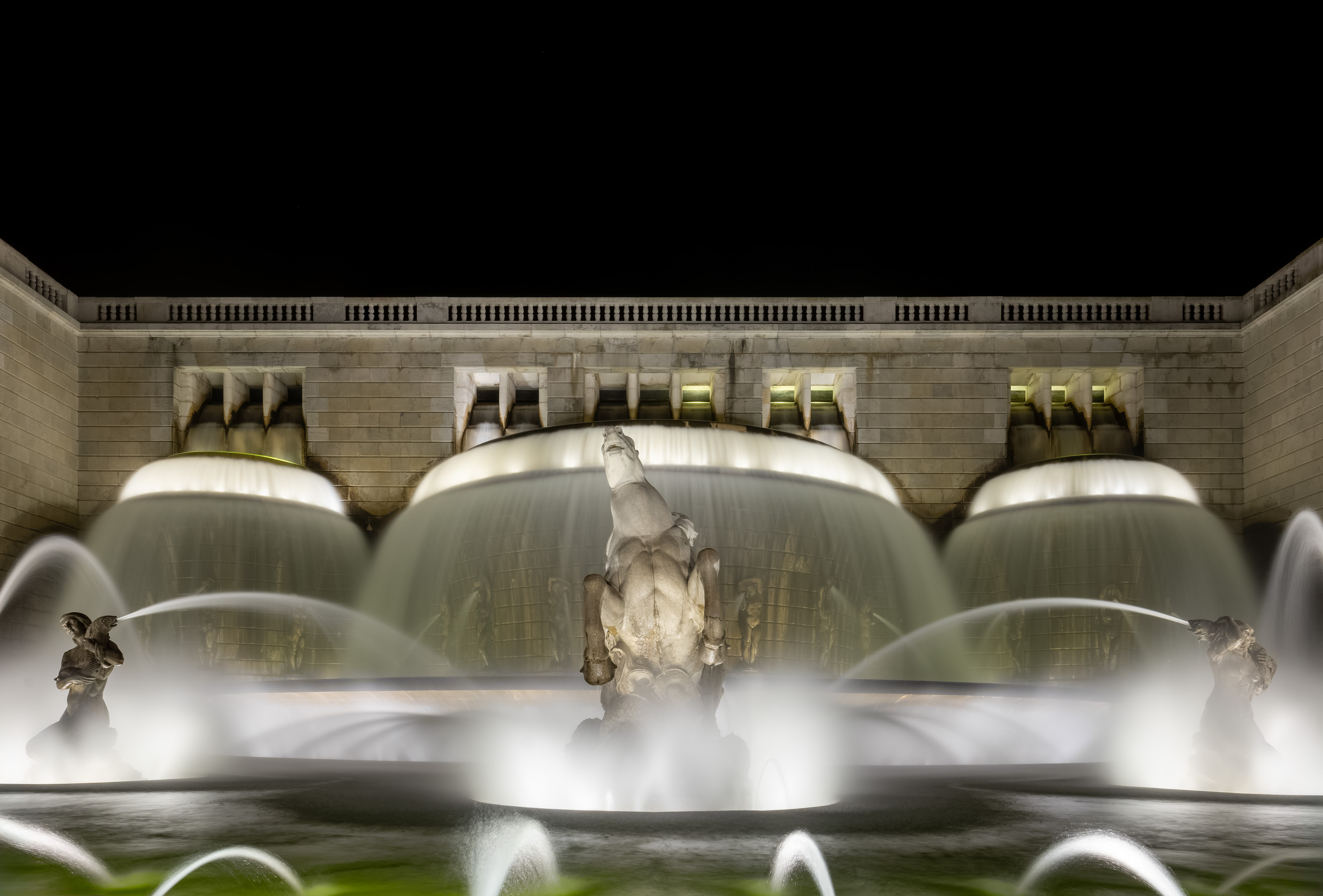
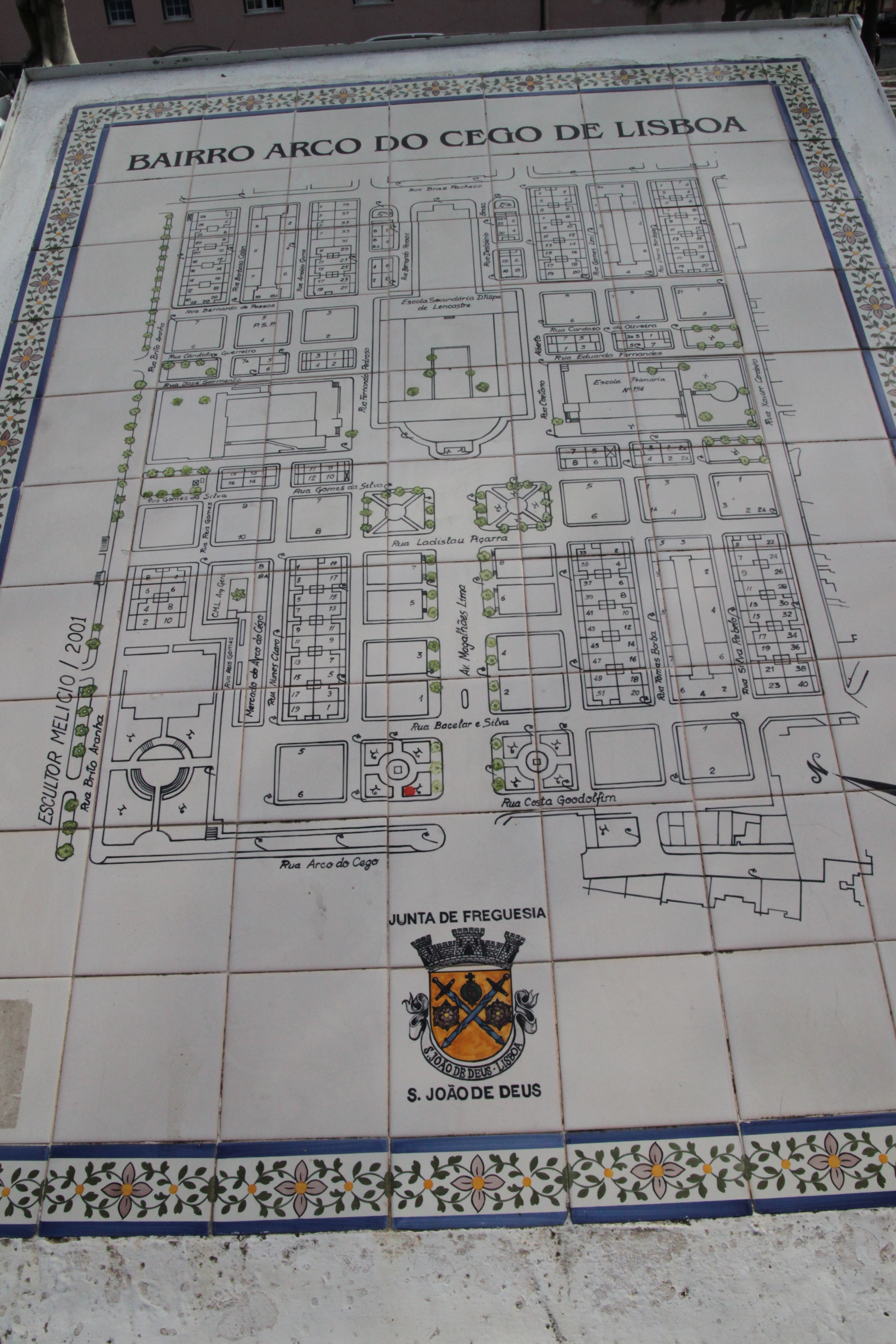
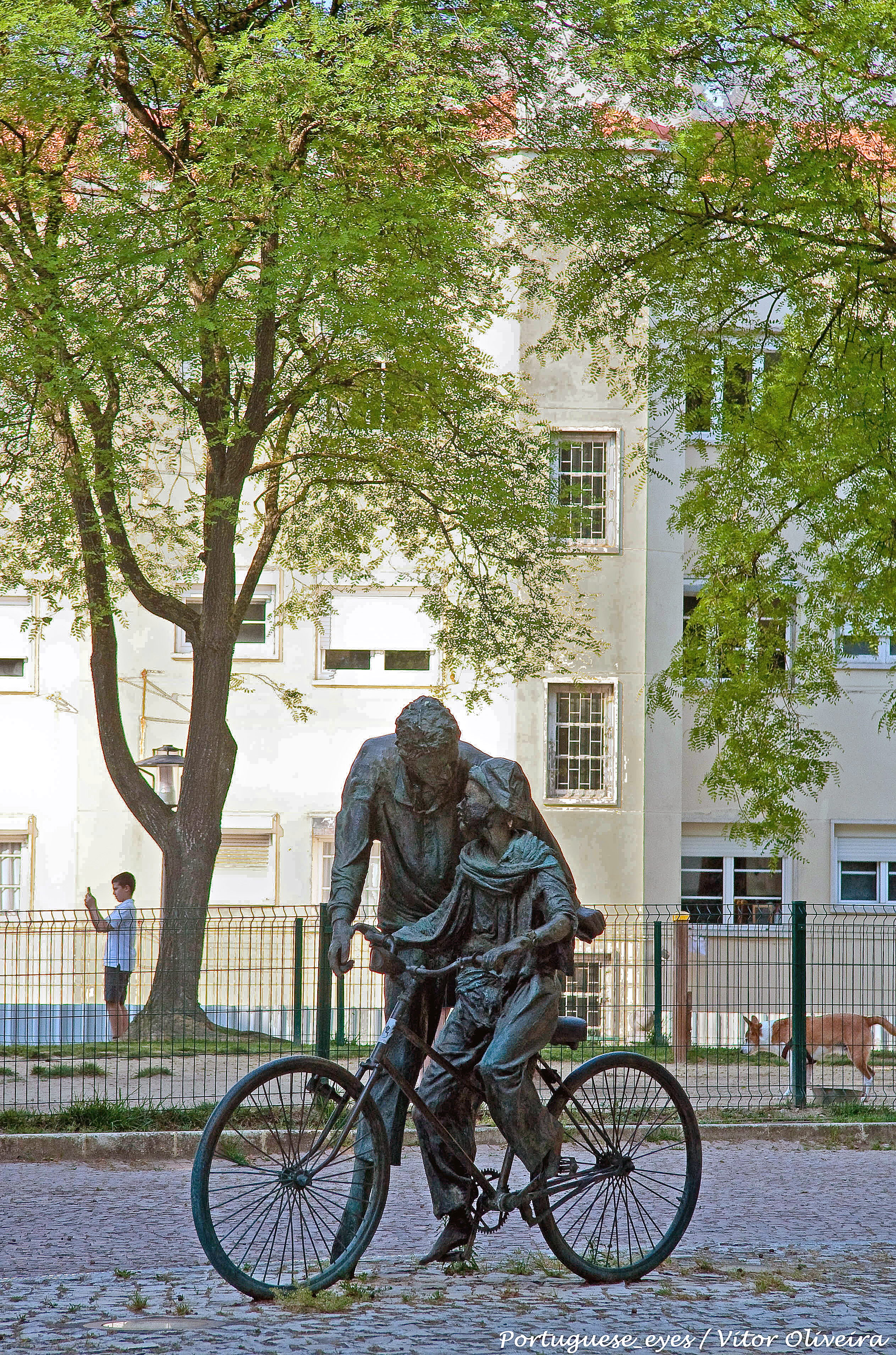
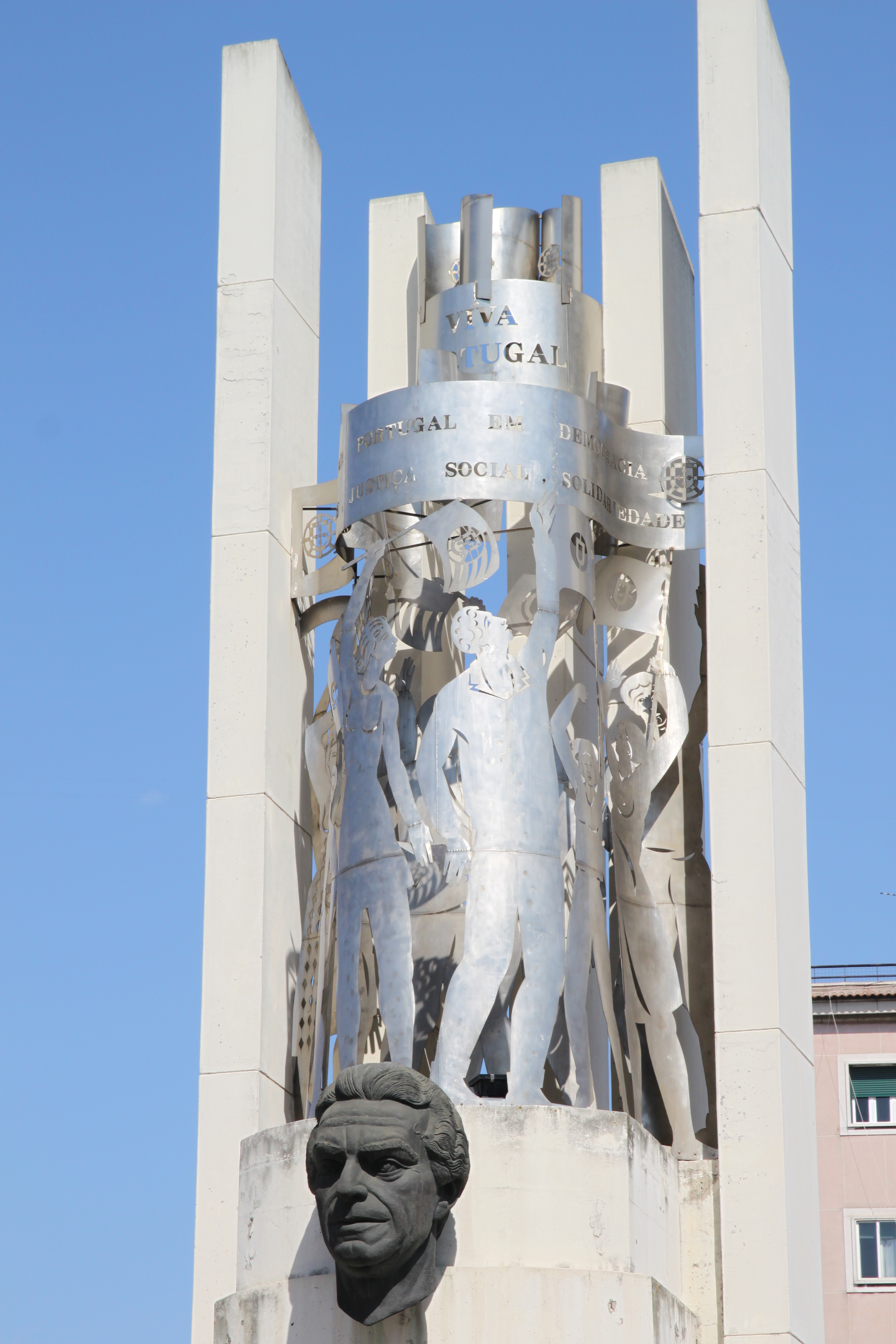
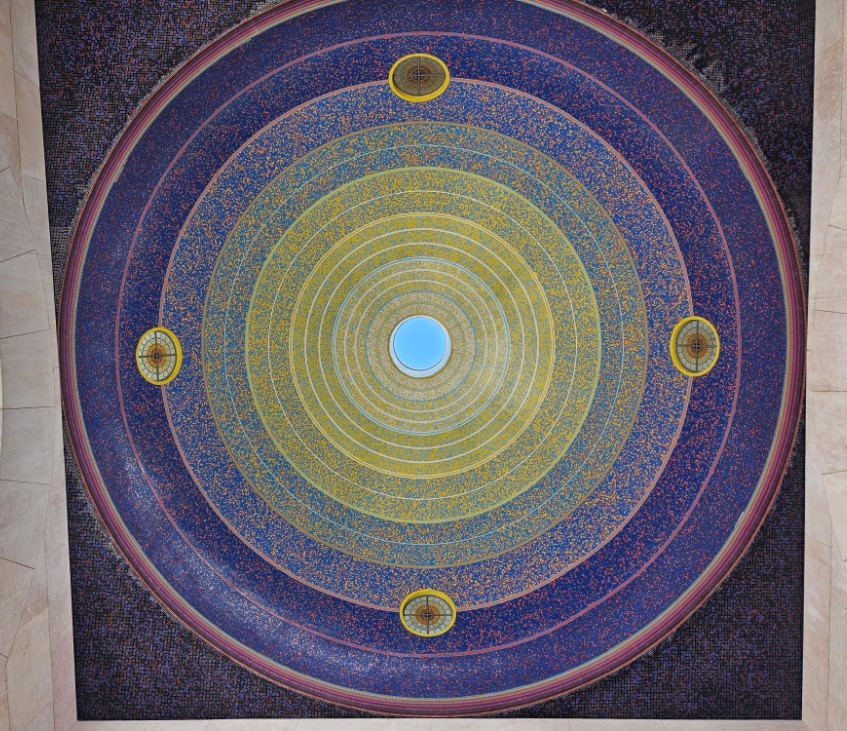
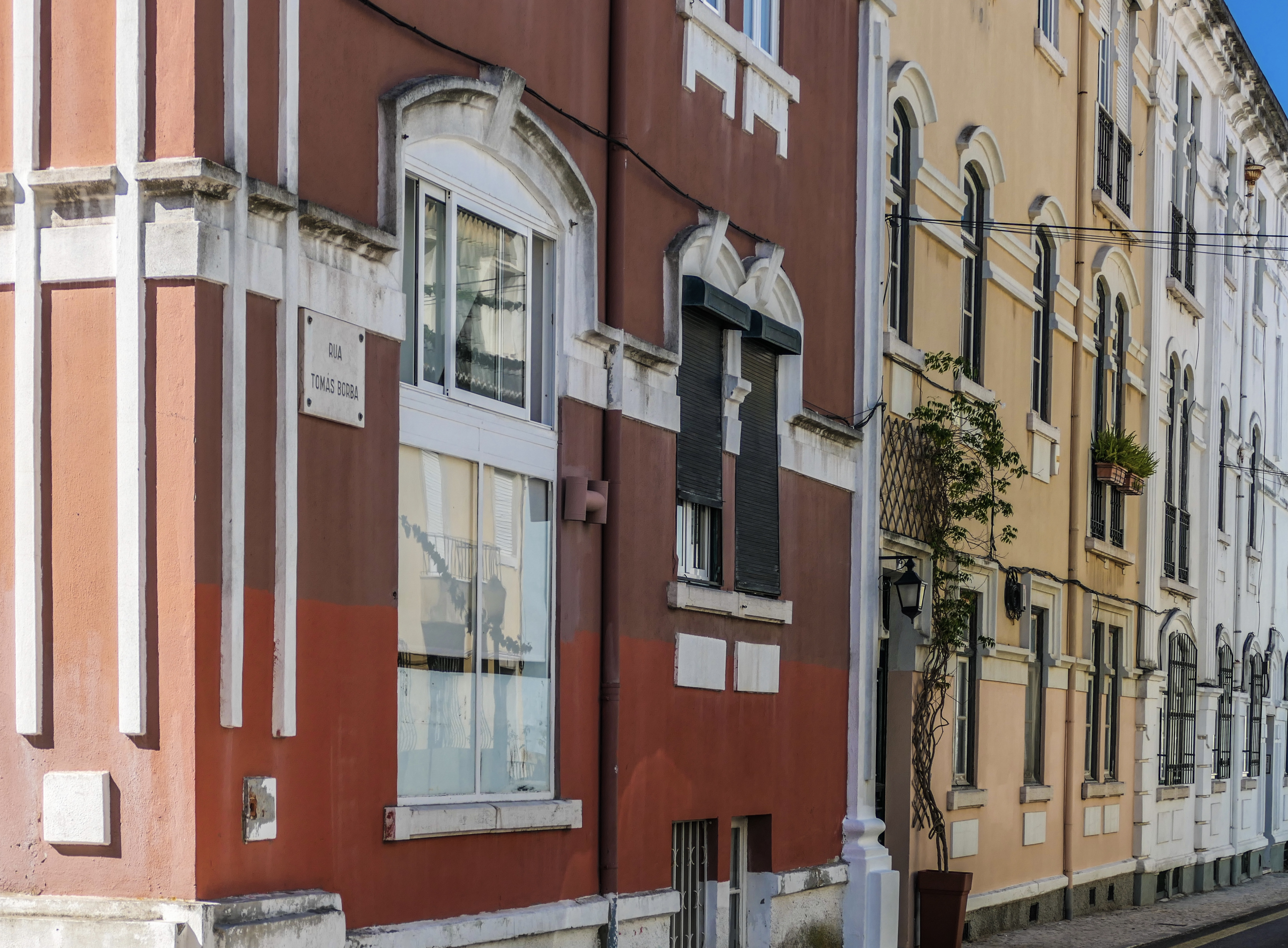
- Clockwise: Fonte Luminosa; Carneiro monument; Garden Fernando Pessa; Parish street view; Abóboda Celeste; Bairro Arco do Cego

- Coordinates: 38.742°N 9.134°W
- Country: Portugal
- Region: Lisbon
- Metropolitan area: Lisbon
- District: Lisbon
- Municipality: Lisbon

Area
  - Total: 1.74 km^{2} (0.67 sq mi)

Population (2021)
  - Total: 21,160
  - Density: 12,200/km^{2} (31,500/sq mi)
- Time zone: UTC+00:00 (WET)
  - Summer (DST): UTC+01:00 (WEST)
- Patron: John of God and the Twelve Apostles
- Website: www.jf-areeiro.pt

Areeiro (Portuguese pronunciation: [ɐˈɾjɐjɾu]) is a freguesia (civil parish) and typical quarter of Lisbon, the capital city of Portugal. Located in central Lisbon, Areeiro is east of Avenidas Novas, west of Marvila, south of Alvalade, and north of Beato, Penha de França, and Arroios. The population in 2021 was 21,160.

== History ==
This freguesia was created with the 2012 Administrative Reform of Lisbon, merging the former parishes of Alto do Pina and São João de Deus.

In 1959 both São João de Deus and Alto do Pina were amongst the 12 parishes created by the administrative reform of the city of Lisbon on February 7, 1959. It remained an independent parish until 2012.

== Demographics ==
Areeiro area before and after the 2012 Portuguese administrative reform

=== Historical resident population (before the 2012 Administrative Reform) ===
The resident population recorded according to Censuses carried over the years is shown in the following tables for the two parishes that today constitute Areeiro. It is noteworthy that the ancient parish of São João de Deus lost 15,145 people from 1960 to 2011 or 60.72% of its 1960 population, not having recorded a single population gain since 1960. Similarly, the ancient parish of Alto do Pina lost 2,237 people or 17.8% of its population from 1960 to 2011, with major population losses recorded in the nineties (-19%).

São João de Deus

Historical population
Year	Pop.	±%
1960	24,943	—
1970	18,892	−24.3%
1981	17,912	−5.2%
1991	13,309	−25.7%
2001	10,782	−19.0%
2011	9,798	−9.1%
Source: INE

Alto do Pina

Historical population
Year	Pop.	±%
1960	12,570	—
1970	10,852	−13.7%
1981	13,110	+20.8%
1991	12,654	−3.5%
2001	10,253	−19.0%
2011	10,333	+0.8%
Source: INE

=== Current resident population (after the 2012 Administrative Reform) ===
In the 2021 Portuguese Census was recorded the first demographic growth of the parish since 1960. In particular, from 2011 to 2021 the parish gained 1,029 people, recording a growth of +5.11%.

Former Parishes			Current Parish			
Parish	Population (2011)	Area (km^{2})	Parish	Population in 2011	Population in 2021	Area (km^{2})
São João de Deus	9,798	0.93	Areeiro	20,131	21,160	1.74
Alto do Pina	10,333	0.84	Areeiro	20,131	21,160	1.74

=== Demographic statistics ===
- Age

The last censuses show that the parish's population is ageing at a fast pace: in 2021 21.25% of the population was below 25 and, at the same time, almost a quarter (23.92%) of the residents was 65 or older.

Distribution of Population by Age Groups
Year	0-14 Years	0-14 Years %	15-24 Years	15-24 Years %	25-64 Years	25-64 Years %	> 65 Years	> 65 Years %
2021	2,279	10.77%	2,217	10.48%	11,102	52.47%	5,062	23.92%

- Religion
Religion in Areeiro (Census 2021)
1. Catholicism (63.9%)
2. Protestantism (2.06%)
3. Jehovah's Witnesses and Other Christian (1.56%)
4. Orthodoxy (0.49%)
5. Islam (1.12%)
6. Hinduism (2.01%)
7. Buddhism (0.42%)
8. Judaism (0.10%)
9. Other religions (0.41%)
10. No religion (28.0%)

The parish is predominantly catholic and 67.99% of the population aged 15 or above are followers of a Christian or Jeovah's Witness denomination as of 2021.

Around 27.96% of the population doesn't practice a religion and is thus non religious.

The presence of minor religions such as Islam, Hinduism and Buddhism (4.05% of the population amongst the three) is probably due to an increasing community of people coming from India, Pakistan, Bangladesh or Nepal.

- Immigration

In 2021, 7.86% of the population of the parish was constituted by foreigners. In particular, amongst men foreigners were 8.95% of the total. This means that in Areeiro there are 1,663 resident foreigners, a sharp increase from 2011, when there were 1,071 resident foreigners (5.32%). Since the foreign population increased by 592 people from 2011 to 2021 and given that the total population of the parish increased by 1,029 units in the same timespan, it is noteworthy that the total population growth was due for more than half to the increase in the number of resident foreigners, thus not counting people who have acquired Portuguese nationality in the meantime. The largest group of foreigners is constituted by the Brazilians (540 people or +53.41% since 2011), PALOP countries (170 people or +17.24% since 2011), Chinese (154 people or +50.98% since 2011) and people from the Indian Subcontinent, most notably Nepalis and Bangladeshis, totaling 261 people, or recording an increase of +455.32% since 2011.

Dealing with the foreign-born population, 15.27% of the parish's population was born abroad as of 2021. The most common countries of birth were PALOP countries (1,066 people), Brazil (813 people) and the Indian Subcontinent (325 people). Of the Portuguese nationals born abroad, the most common countries of birth were PALOP countries (908 people) and Brazil (267 people), all countries having ancient historical ties with Portugal as well as a rooted migration history towards the country, and who are, thus, more likely to have acquired Portuguese citizenship along the years.

Moreover, as of 2021 in the parish there were 2,410 people who have entered Portugal after 2010, constituting 11.39% of the population. Of those with recent migrant background, 23.03% were Portuguese nationals returning from a period of emigration abroad.

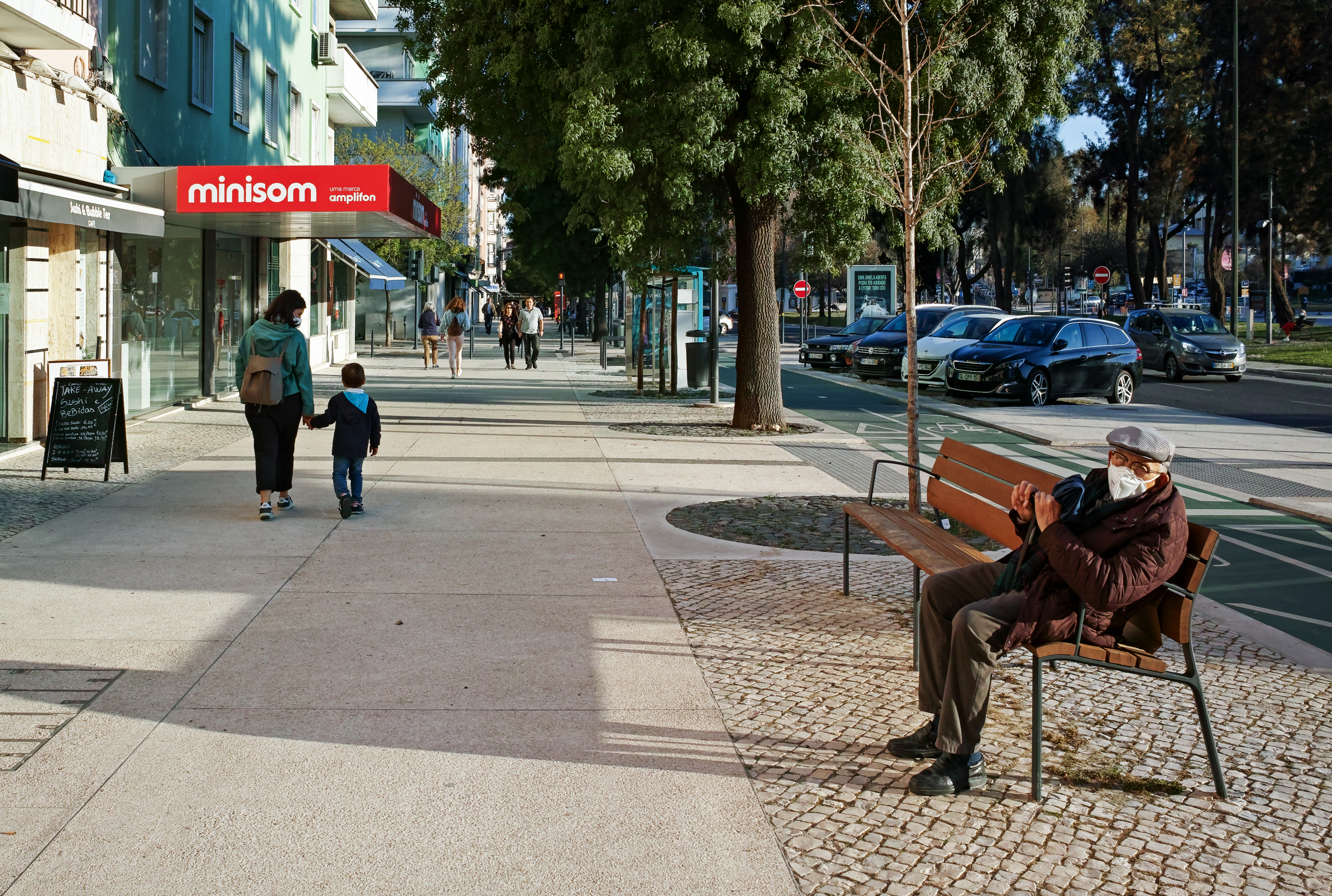
Elder in Praça de Londres. According to the 2021 Census, immigrants are younger than local residents.

Amongst the Portuguese, 3,753 had already lived abroad as of 2021 (19.25% of the Portuguese population). The majority of those having lived in Angola and Mozambique (1,194 people) entered Portugal in the Seventies (725 people or 60.72%), following the independence of the two former colonies (so called retornados). Those coming from countries hosting large Portuguese emigrant communities such as France, Spain, Germany, Switzerland, Luxembourg or Belgium (724 people) have mostly entered Portugal after 1991 (72.24%), probably due to the development of the Portuguese economy since its accession to the EU. 37.59% of the Portuguese nationals having lived in the UK and residing in the parish, has left the UK after 2016, (date of the Brexit referendum).

If the whole population (regardless of the nationality held) is taken into account, then 25.00% of the parish's population has already lived abroad for at least one year as of 2021, with EU countries, PALOP countries, Brazil and the United Kingdom being the most commonly cited countries of previous residence.

== Economy and Social conditions ==
=== Employment ===
In the parish of Areeiro there are 760 residents who, as of 2021, were unemployed. Of these, 42.63% received a state-fund subsidy or pension (41.34% in Lisbon). In 2021 the unemployment rate in the parish is slightly lower than the one recorded for Lisbon and for Portugal as a whole, standing at 7.31%. In the same year, Portugal as a whole had an unemployment rate of 8.13% that has progressively decreased to 6.1% in 2023. As the statistics dealing with unemployment at the parish level are available only every 10 years, the current (2023) unemployment rate in Areeiro is unknown. Amongst youth aged 15–24 the unemployment rate in 2021 in the parish stood at 15.53%, 16.86% lower than in the rest of the country.

On the other hand, in 2021 9,641 residents were employed, of which 72.34% were employees and 24.78% were independent workers. Below is the table showing the employment rate per age group. The low share of people aged 20–24 employed is due to the fact that many are still in education (e.g. university) while the low proportion of those in employment aged 60–64 is due to many being early pensioners.

2021 Census data	Age group								
2021 Census data	20-24	25-29	30-34	35-39	40-44	45-49	50-54	55-59	60-64
Share of people in employment	33.05%	77.92%	80.67%	82.35%	84.37%	83.15%	79.10%	74.98%	61.72%

Dealing with commuting, the residents of Areeiro spent 20.55 minutes of daily commuting, 2 minutes less than the average inhabitant of Lisbon.

=== Social conditions ===
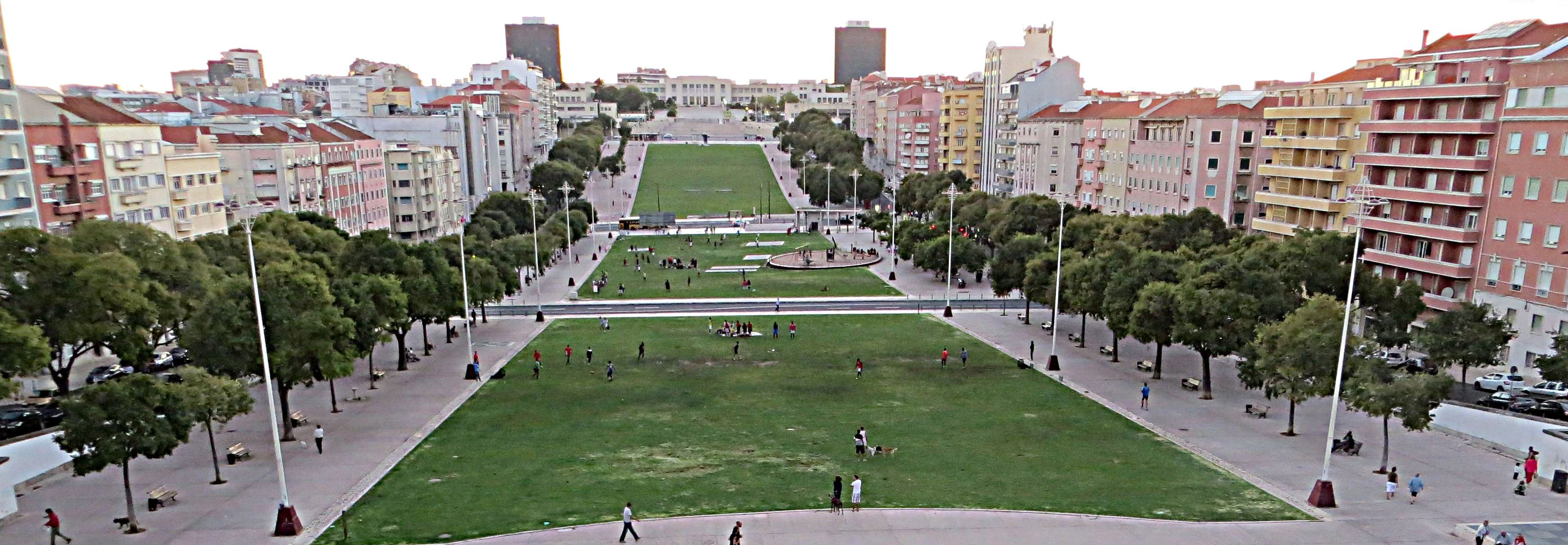
Alameda D.Afonso Henriques

Dealing with overcrowding in the parish's households, 4.82% of the population lives in accommodations where they have less than 15 m^{2} per capita (8.71% for Lisbon and 5.65% in Portugal as a whole), while 48.06% live in houses with more than 40 m^{2} per capita (39.64% for Lisbon and 46.84% in Portugal as a whole). There are 7,294.2 dwellings per km^{2} (3,200.5 for Lisbon and 64.9 in Portugal as a whole).

49.8% of the population lives in owned dwellings as of 2021; this is slightly lower than the values recorded both for Lisbon (50.3%) but significantly lower than the one recorded for Portugal (70%). The average height of a residential building in Areeiro is 5.2 floors as of 2021 and the average area of a dwelling stands at 106.16 m^{2} (with the average in Lisbon-city 93.07 m^{2} being and in Portugal 112.45 m^{2}).

The average monthly rent value of leased dwellings recorded in 2021 stood at €601.87, 27.82% higher than the Lisbon average in the same year (€470.87). It is nonetheless important to notice that the value of the rents is quite low because of many contracts stipulated decades ago, with 13.38% (25.34% in Lisbon) of the dwellers paying less than €150/month because of the rent-freezing system that was adopted in Portugal in the late XX century, allowing that many people, now mostly elders, don't have to pay high rents. Due to the housing crisis and inflation, in 2023 the average rent for new contracts (frozen contracts aren't concerned) stood in fact at €13/m^{2} in Areeiro, meaning that for the average 106.16 m^{2} dwelling are necessary around €1,380/month.

Dealing with housing prices, it is interesting to remark that if the median price per m^{2} stood at €1,803 for a house sold in early 2016, this value had risen to €3,559/m^{2} in early 2021 and to €4,072/m^{2} in 2023, experiencing a growth of +125.85% in just 7 years. In the same period the growth of house priced per m^{2} in Lisbon as a whole was +117.6%, from €1,875/m^{2} to €4,080/m^{2}.

Of the 1,377 residential buildings listed in the parish, 0.65% were built before 1919, 68.19% from 1919 to 1960, 22.95% from 1961 to 1990, 3.49% from 1991 to 2000 and 4.72% after 2001. Of the buildings built before 1919 55.56% had 1 to 3 floors, while in buildings built between 1981 and 2010 the proportion of buildings with 6 stories or more is 50.51%. Interestingly, the newer and higher the building the higher the probability of it being served by an elevator. For homes built before 1946, only 10.25% have access to an elevator as of 2021; this percentage ascends to 57.58% for buildings dating from 1981 to 2010. Always with regard to amenities, 25.61% of the houses had access to air conditioning (20.98% in Lisbon), 78.47% to heating (69.62% in Lisbon) and 23.88% to a parking place (28.04% in Lisbon).

As of 2021 there were 1,758 vacant dwelling in the parish. Of the vacant dwellings, 1,028 are vacant for rental or with the purpose of being sold, while 730 are vacant for other reasons, often abandoned, awaiting their demolition or because a reason for conflict among heirs. Moreover, as of 2023 247 apartments are registered as "Alojamento Local", meaning they have the license to be rent on platforms such as Booking.com or Airbnb.

In the parish there were no records of homeless people. The parish is nonetheless actively promoting initiatives aiming at helping people in situation of permanent of temporal homelessness.

== Landmarks ==
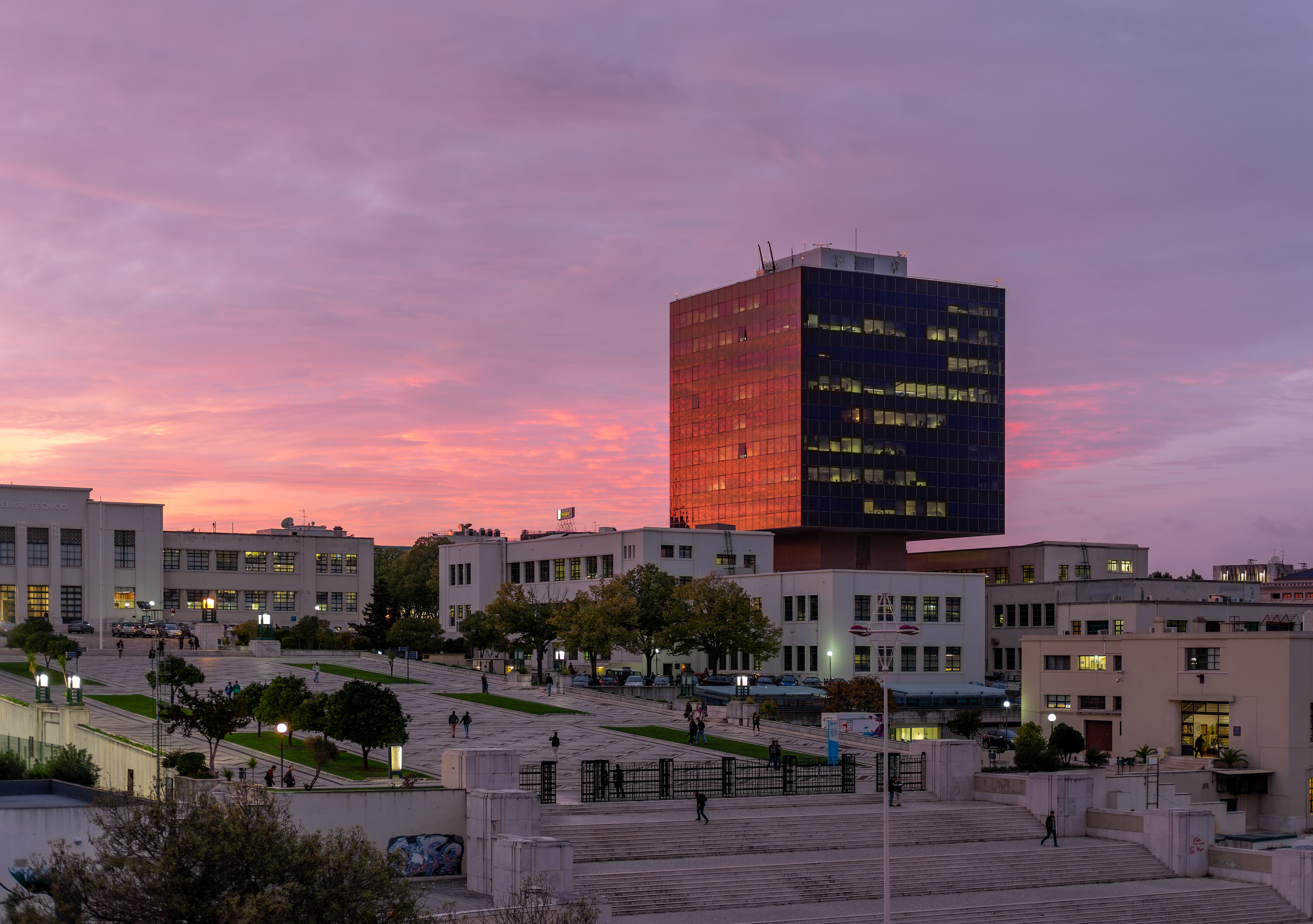
Instituto Superior Técnico at sunset

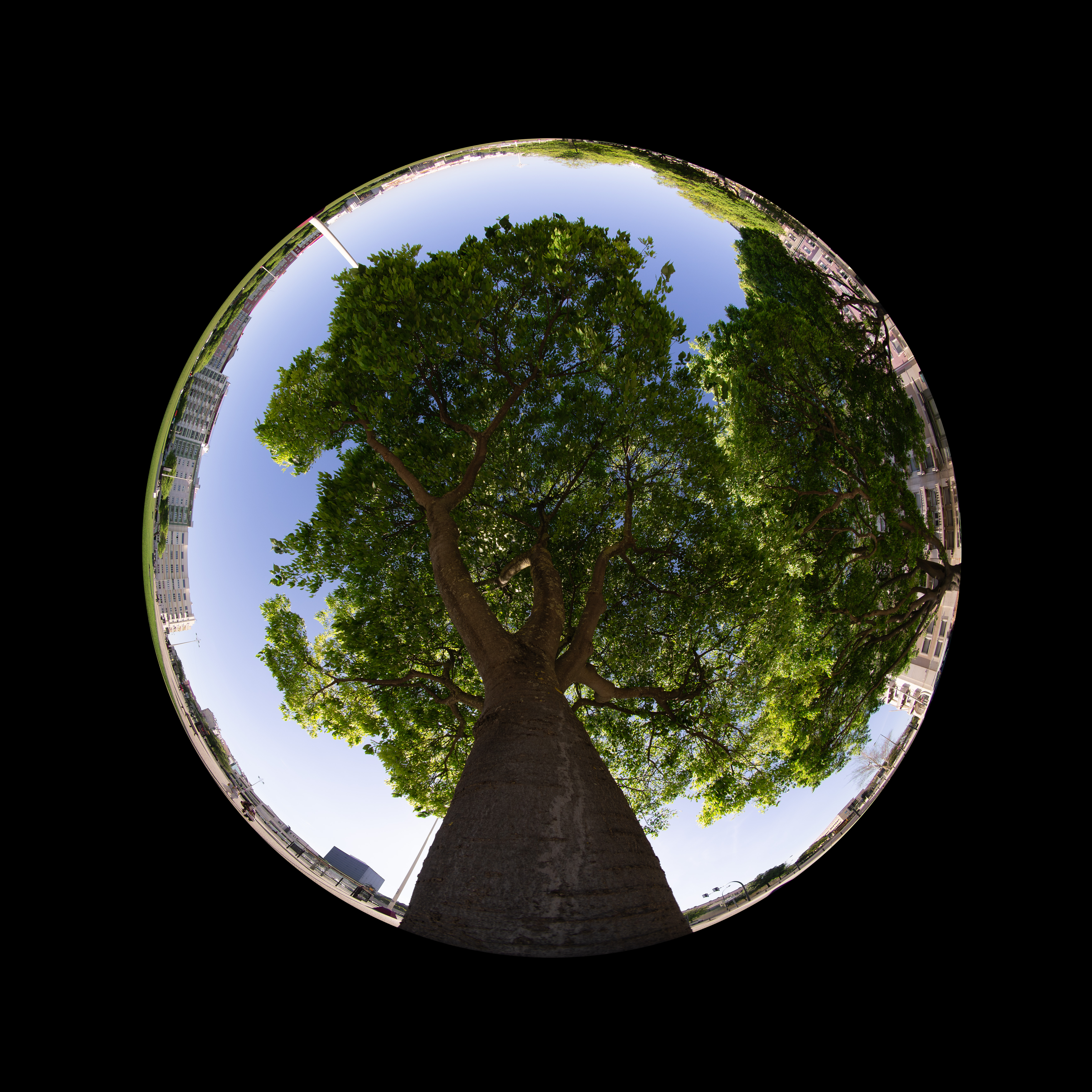
Fisheye image of Celtis australis, Alameda Dom Afonso Henriques

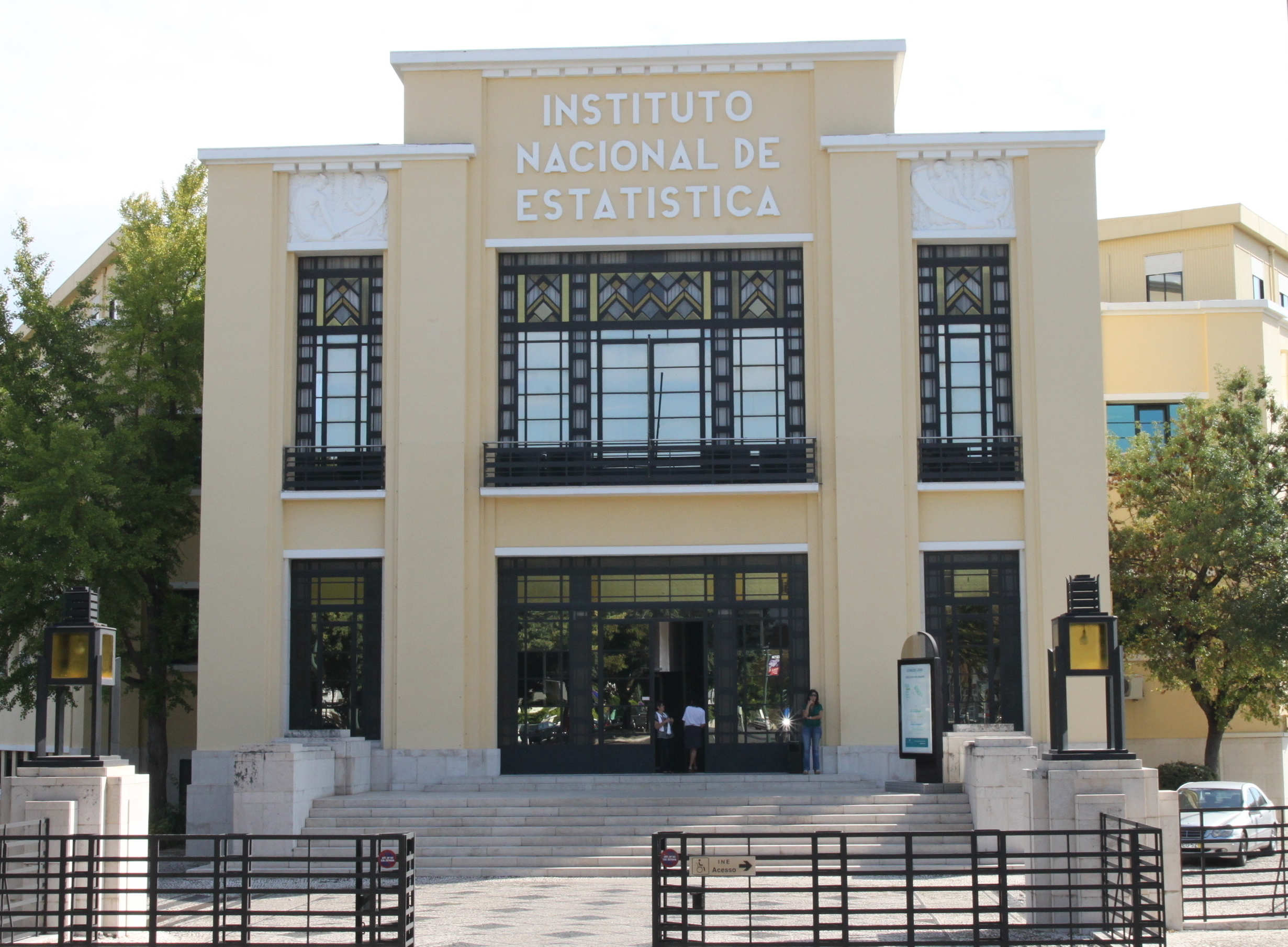
National Statistics Institute (INE)

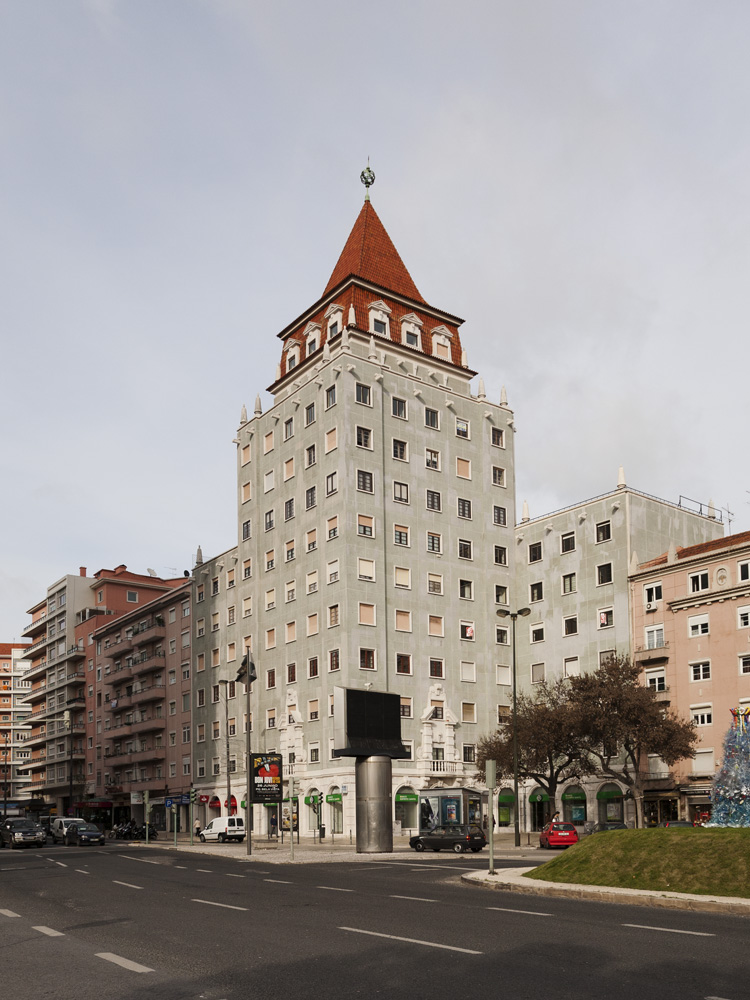
Torre nordeste, by Cassiano Branco

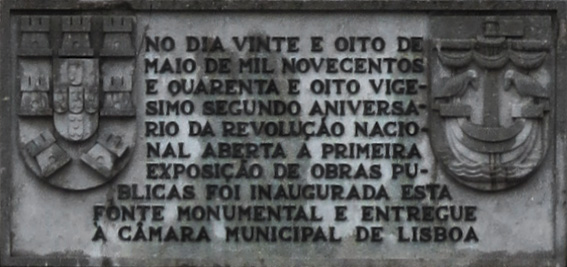
Plaque for the inauguration of Fonte Luminosa

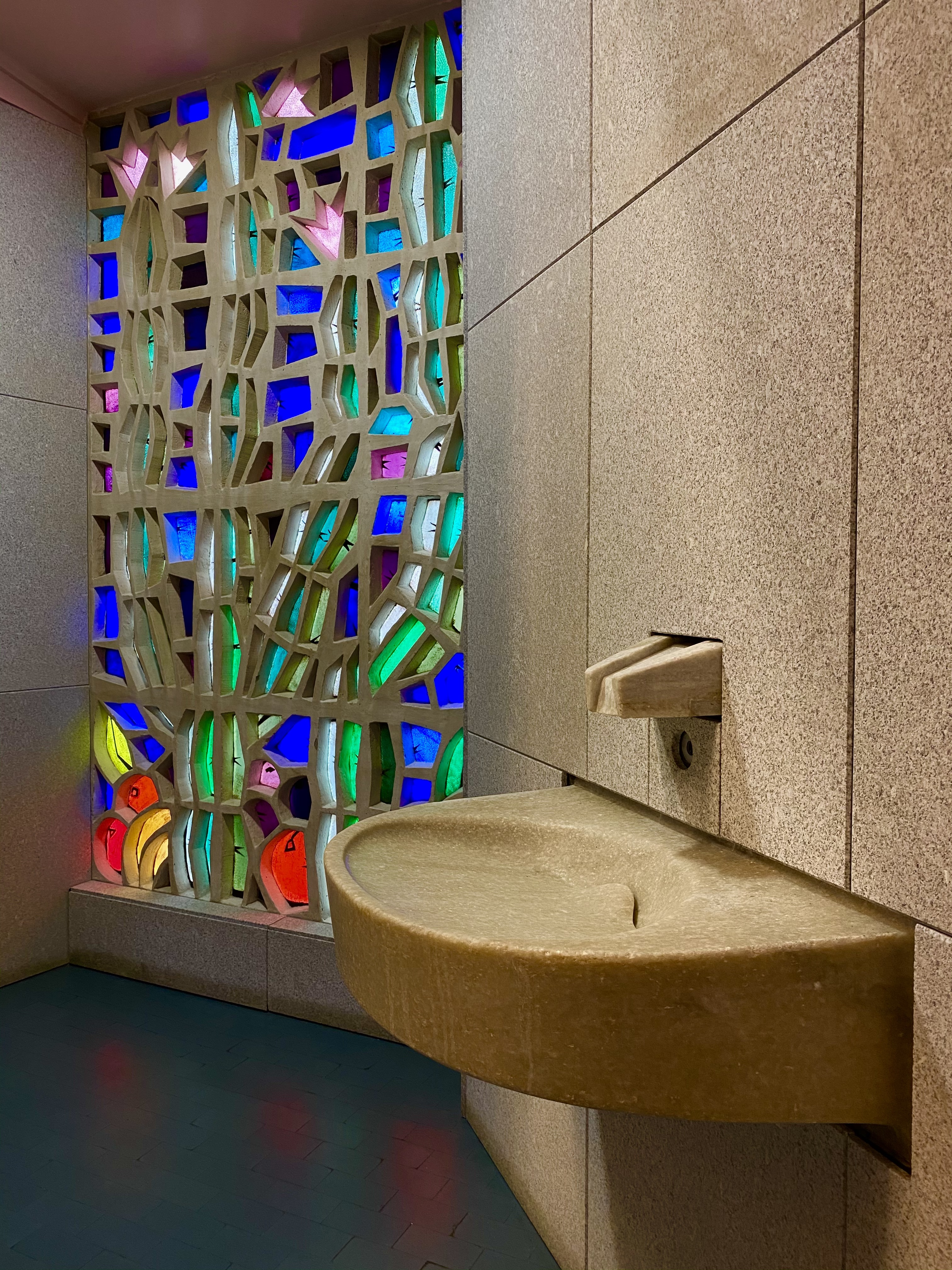
Jorge Ferreira Chaves, 1962

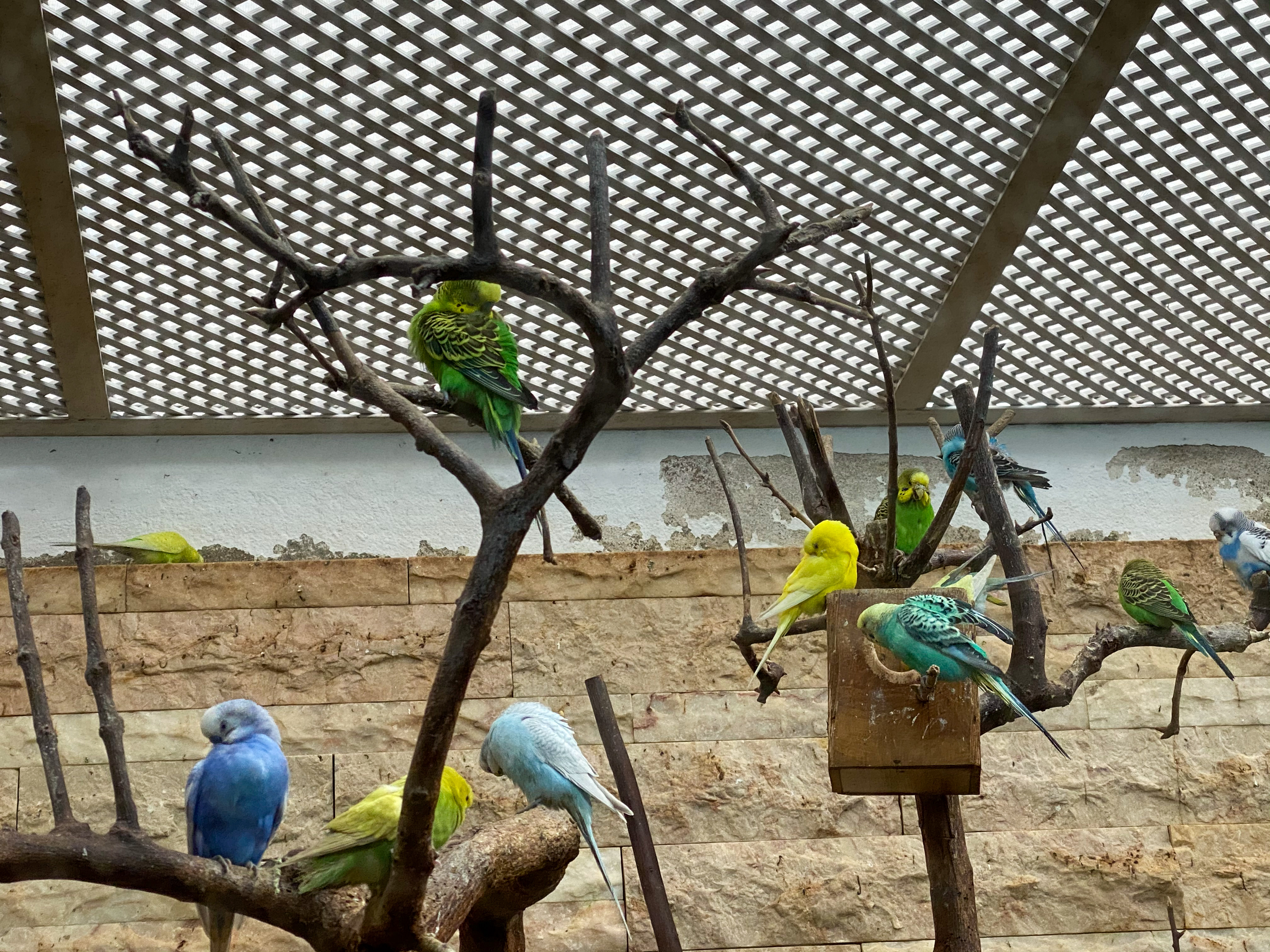
Parrots at Mexicana pastry shop

- Alameda Dom Afonso Henriques
- Avenida de Paris, Praça Pasteur, architectural complex designed by architects Raúl Chorão Ramalho, Alberto Pessoa, Lucínio Cruz and José Bastos .
- Avenida João XXI, architectural complex designed by architects Filipe Nobre de Figueiredo, José Segurado, Joaquim Ferreira (architect) and Guilherme Gomes
- Azulejo panels in Monteiro Torres
- Bairro social Arco do Cego: one of the first examples of social housing in Portugal, built between the period of the First Portuguese Republic and that of the Estado Novo
- Caixa Geral de Depósitos headquarters
- CGD garden monuments and sculptures
- Culturgest
- Esculturas do Vices-Reis da India
- Escola Secundária D. Filipa de Lencastre, an important work of Portuguese modernism, designed by the architect Jorge de Almeida Segurado
- Fonte Luminosa: Designed in 1938 by Carlos and Guilherme Rebelo de Andrade, with sculptures by Diogo de Macedo and Maximiano Alves. Inaugurated in 1943
- Fórum Lisboa
- House on Av. José António de Almeida, an important work of Portuguese modernism, designed by architect Luís Cristino da Silva.
- Igreja de São João de Deus, by architect António Lino
- Instituto Nacional de Estatística: Built in 1932 by architect P. Pardal Monteiro, featuring a distinguished grand hall adorned with a frieze by Henrique Franco and a staircase stained glass by Abel Manta. Still housing the National Institute of Statistics, responsible for statistical notation, compilation, coordination, and dissemination of data. The building, including its walls and grounds, is currently undergoing classification
- Instituto Superior Técnico Alameda campus, with a project by Porfírio Pardal Monteiro
- Padrão do Campo Pequeno: The Campo Pequeno Standard, ordered by Queen Saint Isabel in the 14th century, lost parts due to displacement. Remains a simple column with a commemorative plaque from Queen Isabel's intervention in a royal dispute
- Pastelaria, Café and Restaurante "Mexicana", designed by Jorge Ferreira Chaves and chairs designed by José Espinho
- Praça de Londres
- Praça do Areeiro, architectural complex designed by Luís Cristino da Silva
- Monument "António José de Almeida": Monument erected by architect Pardal Monteiro, sculpted by Leopoldo de Almeida, unveiled December 31, 1937, by government initiative at the junction of Av. Miguel Bombarda and Av. António José de Almeida. Depicts statesman António José de Almeida, with Republic figure
- Monument "Gato assanhado"
- Monument "A cadeira do poder", also known as "Ad Ephemeram Gloriam"
- Monument "A família": Hyper-realistic bronze sculpture set: a girl sits holding a butterfly; a lady sits on a bench; two boys, one standing beside the other riding a bicycle. Unveiled July 17, 2001, at Forum Lisboa Garden
- Monument "Afonso Costa", also featuring a small lake
- Monument "As Três Graças"
- Monument "Caracol"
- Monument "Contrapunto"
- Monument "Estátua de Figura masculina"
- Monument "Golden totem"
- Monument "João do Rio"
- Monument "O poeta e a Musa"
- Monument "Pelicano"
- Monument "S. João de Deus"
- Monument "Stuart Carvalhais"
- Monument to engineering
- Monument "São João de Deus"
- Monument to Francisco Sá Carneiro
- Monument to Guerra Junqueiro
- Quinta das Ameias ruins
- Statues honouring theater
- Torre Norte of Praça de Londres, designed by architect Cassiano Branco
- Torre Sul of Praça de Londres, headquarters of the Ministry of Social Security and Employment, designed by architect Sérgio Andrade Gomes (it was the tallest building in Lisbon at the time of its inauguration).

== Notable people ==
- Maria Isabel Barreno (1939–2016): Portuguese writer
