= São João de Deus, Lisbon =

São João de Deus
- Civil parish
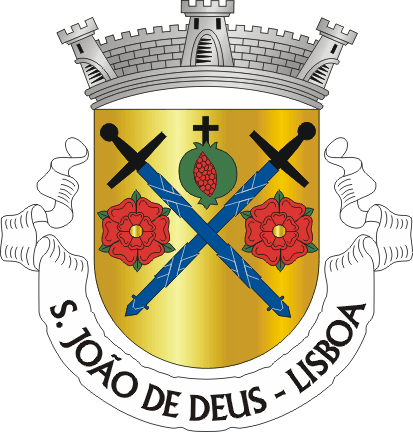
- Coat of arms

- Location in Portugal
- Coordinates: 38.44°N 9.08°W
- Country: Portugal
- Region: Lisbon
- Metropolitan area: Lisbon
- District: Lisbon
- Municipality: Lisbon
- Disbanded: 2012

Area
  - Total: 0.90 km^{2} (0.35 sq mi)

Population (2001)
  - Total: 10,782
  - Density: 12,000/km^{2} (31,000/sq mi)
- Time zone: UTC+00:00 (WET)
  - Summer (DST): UTC+01:00 (WEST)

São João de Deus (English: Saint John of God) was a Portuguese parish (freguesia) in the municipality of Lisbon. With the 2012 Administrative Reform, the parish merged with the Alto do Pina parish into a new one named Areeiro.

== Main sites ==
- São João de Deus Church
