= Graça Pereira Coutinho =

Portuguese visual artist (born 1949)

- Born: 1949 (age 76–77); Lisbon, Portugal
- Known for: Painting, sculpture, installation art

Graça Pereira Coutinho (born 1949) is a Portuguese visual artist who has lived in London since 1971.

== Early life and education ==
Coutinho was born in the Portuguese capital of Lisbon. She was the granddaughter of the Portuguese aviation pioneer, Gago Coutinho. She attended the sculpture course at the Lisbon School of Fine Arts (ESBAL) between 1966 and 1971. Becoming disillusioned with the extreme academicism of that institution, she moved to London in 1971, where she connected with other Portuguese artists living in England, many of whom had left Portugal because of the autocratic Estado Novo government of the time. There, she studied at St. Martins School of Art, taking a postgraduate course between 1974 and 1977. Having initially enrolled in the sculpture course, she switched to a postgraduate degree in painting. In 1974, she received a scholarship from the Inner London Education Authority (ILEA) and between 1975 and 1977 she received a scholarship from the Calouste Gulbenkian Foundation, Lisbon.

== Career ==
Coutinho has lived and worked in London since first moving there. Her art covers a variety of media, from painting and sculpture to photography and installation art. Her work has been said to be guided by principles of conceptual art, and to reference the works of Eva Hesse and Agnes Martin. She uses materials taken directly from the natural world (wood, earth, sand, water, straw, etc.), combined with threads and fabrics, plastic, glass, and other man-made materials. Her work has been said to reveal a particular "appreciation for precarious and ephemeral materials", which she uses in an unconventional way. She paints with her hands, never with brushes.

== Exhibitions ==
Coutinho has exhibited widely in Portugal, Brazil, Great Britain and elsewhere. Her solo exhibitions have included:

- 1975 – National Society of Fine Arts (SNBA), Lisbon
- 1978 – Galeria Módulo, Porto
- 1979 – Riverside Studios, London
- 1980 – Galeria Módulo, Lisbon
- 1983 – National Society of Fine Arts, Lisbon
- 1986 – Galeria Quadrum, Lisboa and Galeria Bertrand, Lisbon
- 1987 – The Showroom Gallery, London
- 1988 – Todd Gallery, London
- 1989, 1990 – Todd Gallery, London
- 1989 - Calouste Gulbenkian Foundation, Lisbon
- 1991 – De Warrande Cultural Centre, Turnhout, Belgium
- 1992 – Todd Gallery, London and Galeria Graça Fonseca, Lisbon
- 1995 – Galeria Graça Fonseca, Lisbon
- 1997 – Todd Gallery, London
- 1998 – Galeria Cesar, Lisbon; Galeria Gomes Alves, Guimarães
- 1999 – Galeria Porta 33, Funchal, Madeira
- 2000 – Cristina Guerra Contemporary Art, Lisbon
- 2002 – Pavilhão Branco, Museu da Cidade (Pimenta Palace), Lisbon, Portugal; Museu Histórico Nacional, Rio de Janeiro; Centro Britânico, S. Paulo; Centro Cultural ECCO, Brasília
- 2003 – Cristina Guerra Contemporary Art, Lisbon, Portugal; Estação das Docas, Belém, Brazil; Museu de Arte Contemporânea, Belém, Brazil; Palácio das Artes, Belo Horizonte, Brazil
- 2004 – Galeria João Esteves e Oliveira, Lisbon
- 2006 – Galeria Luís Serpa, Lisbon; Cristina Guerra Contemporany Art, Lisbon
- 2007 – Galeria Sete, Coimbra; Museu de Arte Sacra, Funchal
- 2008 – Galeria Quase – Espaço T, Porto
- 2009 – Galeria Carlos Carvalho, Lisbon
- 2010 – Galeria Gomes Alves, Guimarães

Between March and May 2024 she presented an exhibition in Lisbon, called Peace and Ruins. Between March and July 2025, her work was presented in a collection at the Centro de Arte Moderna Gulbenkian called Arte Britânica – Ponto de Fuga (British Art - Vanishing Point), in which both British artists and foreign artists living in Britain were represented.

Her work is found in several public and private collections, including those of: Culturgest, Caixa Geral de Depósitos, António Prates Foundation; PLMJ Foundation; Museum of Contemporary Art Belém, Brazil; Osaka Contemporary Art Center, Japan; Calouste Gulbenkian Foundation, Lisbon; and the Berardo Collection Museum, Belém Cultural Centre, Lisbon.
