= Pedro Calapez =

Portuguese artist

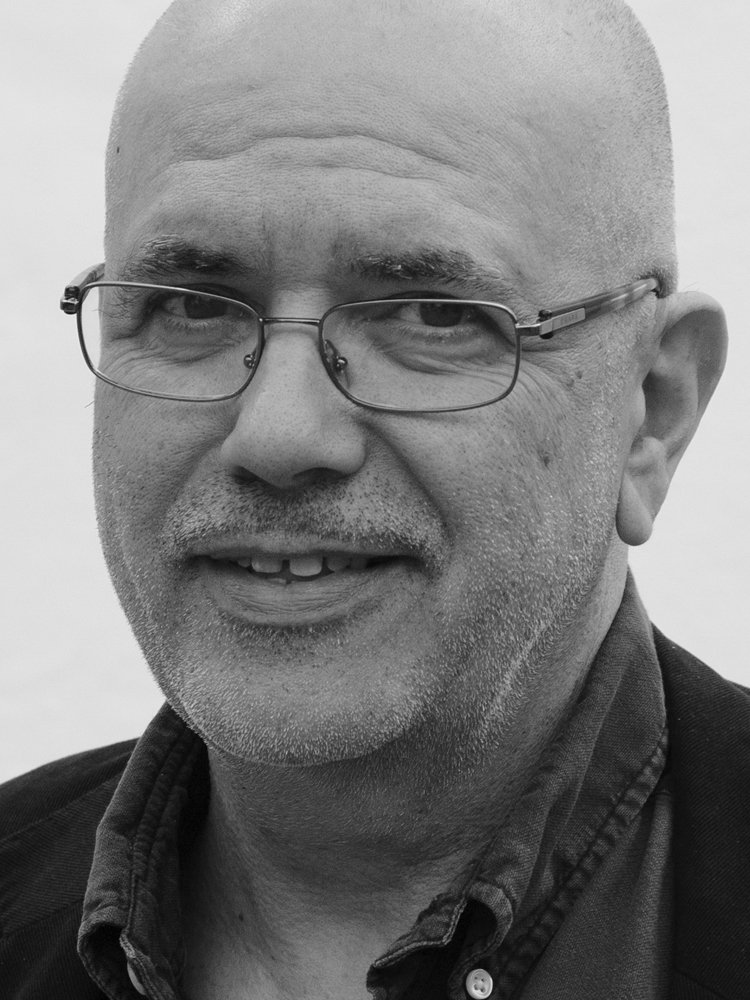
Pedro Calapez, 2013

Pedro Calapez, (born 1953 in Lisbon) is a Portuguese painter.

He began taking part in group exhibitions in the 1970s. In 1982 had his first solo show. He has exhibited his work individually in various galleries and museums, most notably Histórias de objectos, Casa de la Cittá, Roma, Carré des Arts, Paris and Gulbenkian Foundation, Lisbon (1991); Petit jardin et paysage, Salpêtriére Chapel, Paris (1993); Memória involuntária, Chiado Museum, Lisbon (1996); Campo de Sombras, Pilar i Joan Miró Foundation, Majorca (1997); Studiolo, INTERVAL-Raum fur Kunst & Kultur, Witten, Germany (1998); Madre Agua, MEIAC - Contemporary Art Museum, Badajoz and CAAC - Andalucia Contemporary Art Centre (2002); Selected works 1992-2004, Gulbenkian Foundation, Lisbon (2004); piso zero, CGAC - Galicia Contemporary Art Centre, Santiago de Compostela (2005); Lugares de pintura, CAB - Caja Burgos Art Centre, Burgos (2005). Most outstanding among the various collective exhibitions in which he has taken part are the biennials of Venice (1986) and S.Paulo (1987 and 1991) and the exhibitions: 10 Contemporâneos, Serralves Museum, OPorto (1992); Perspectives, Marne-La-Vallée Contemporary Art Centre (1994); The day after tomorrow, CCB - Belém Cultural Centre, Lisbon (1994); Ecos de la materia, MEIAC, Badajoz (1996); Tage Der Dunkelheit Und Des Lichts, Bonn Art Museum (1999); EDP.ARTE, Serralves Museum, OPorto (2001); Del Zero al 2005. Insights on Portuguese art - Marcelino Botín Foundation, Santander (2005); Beaufort Outside - Inside, Contemporary Art Triennial, PMMK Museum, Ostend (2006).

His works can be seen here.
