= Instituto Nacional de Estatística (São Tomé and Príncipe) =

Public statistics institute

The Instituto Nacional de Estatística (Portuguese for the National Statistics Institute, abbreviated as INE) is the public statistics institute of São Tomé and Príncipe. It is the central executive body of the National Statistical System (Sistema Estatístico Nacional, SEN), which is responsible for the production and dissemination of official statistics. Its current director is Elsa Maria Cardoso. Population censuses have been held roughly every decade: in 1981, 1991, 2001, and 2012.
