= Penha de França =

- Civil parish
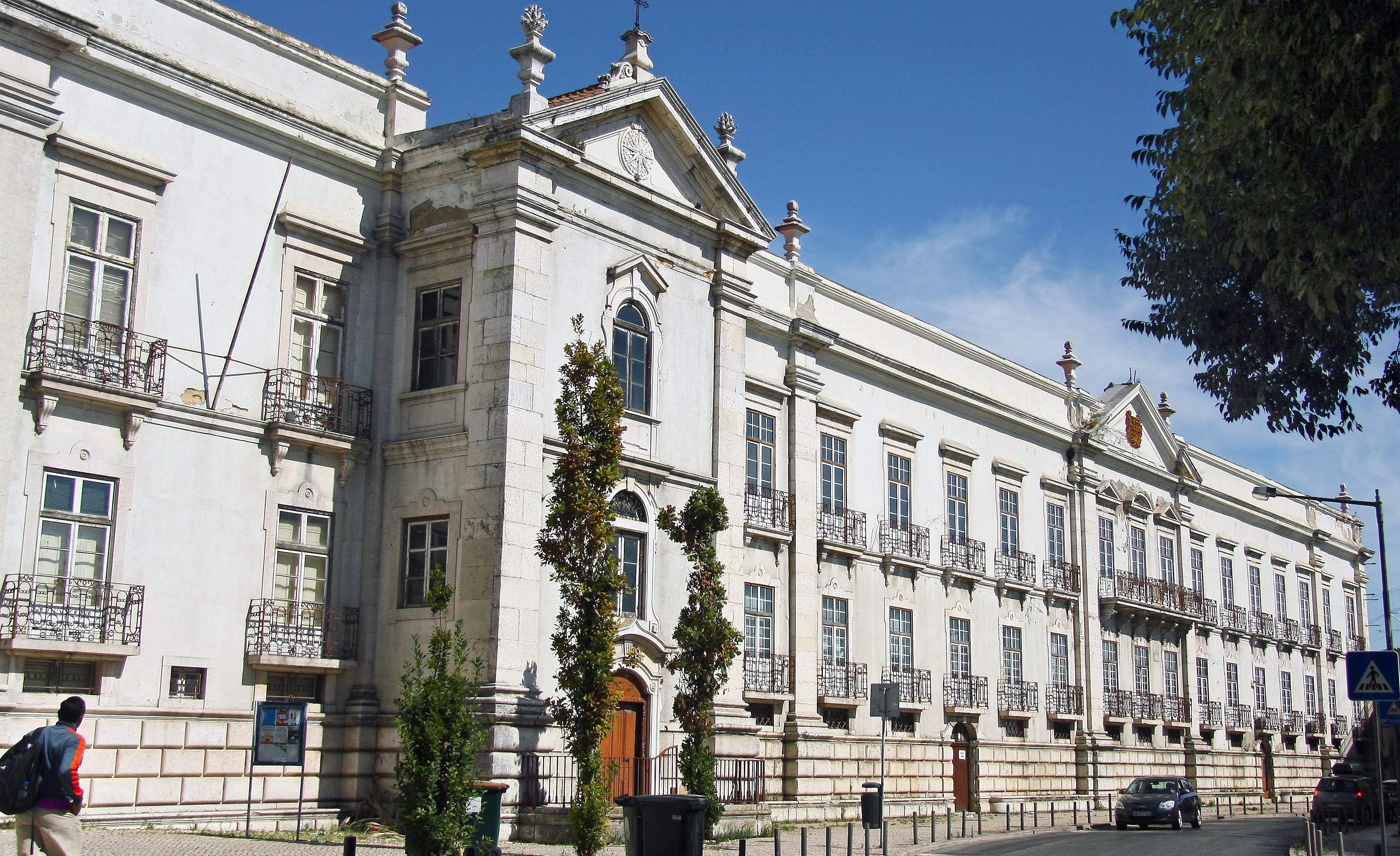
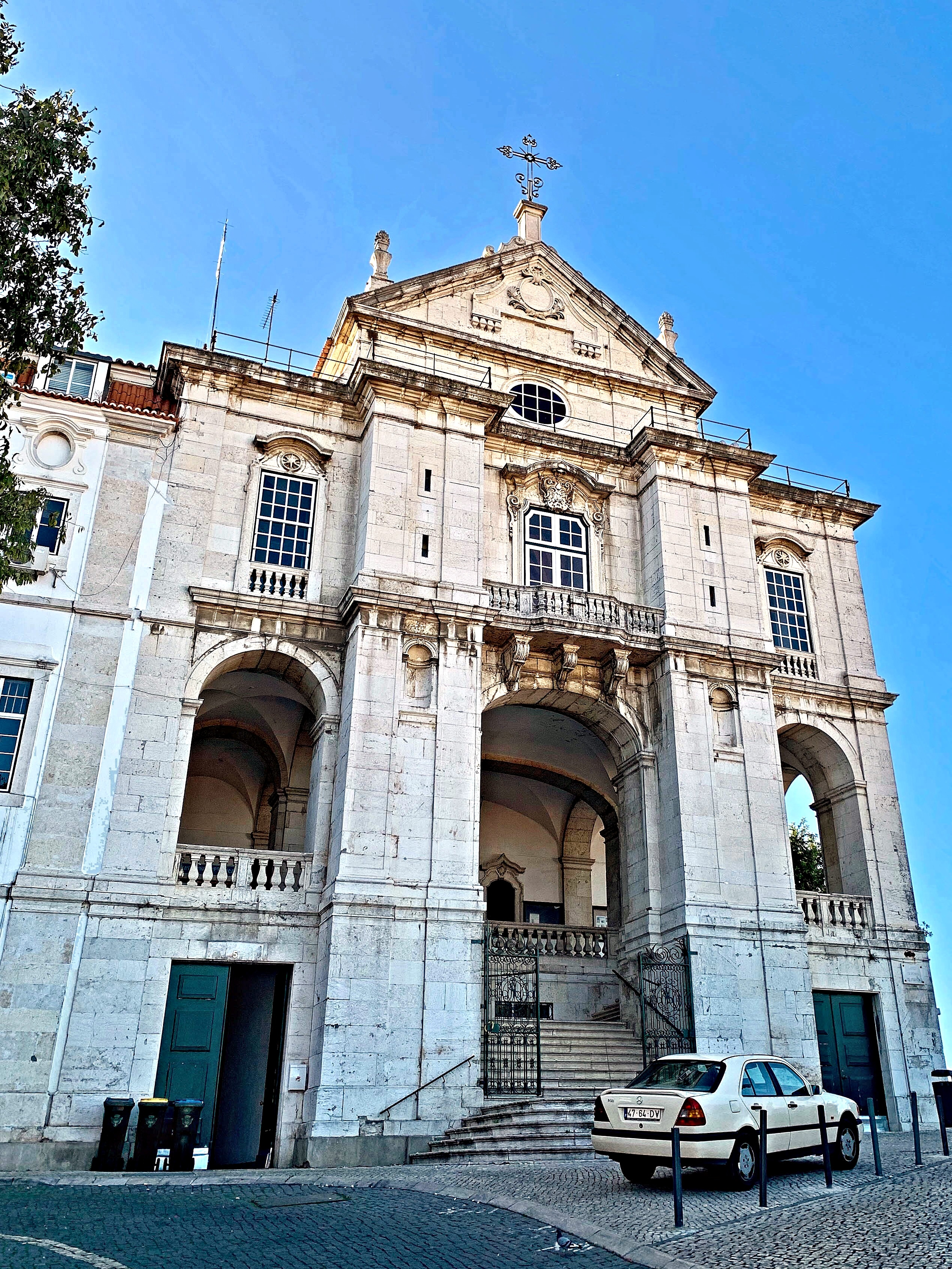
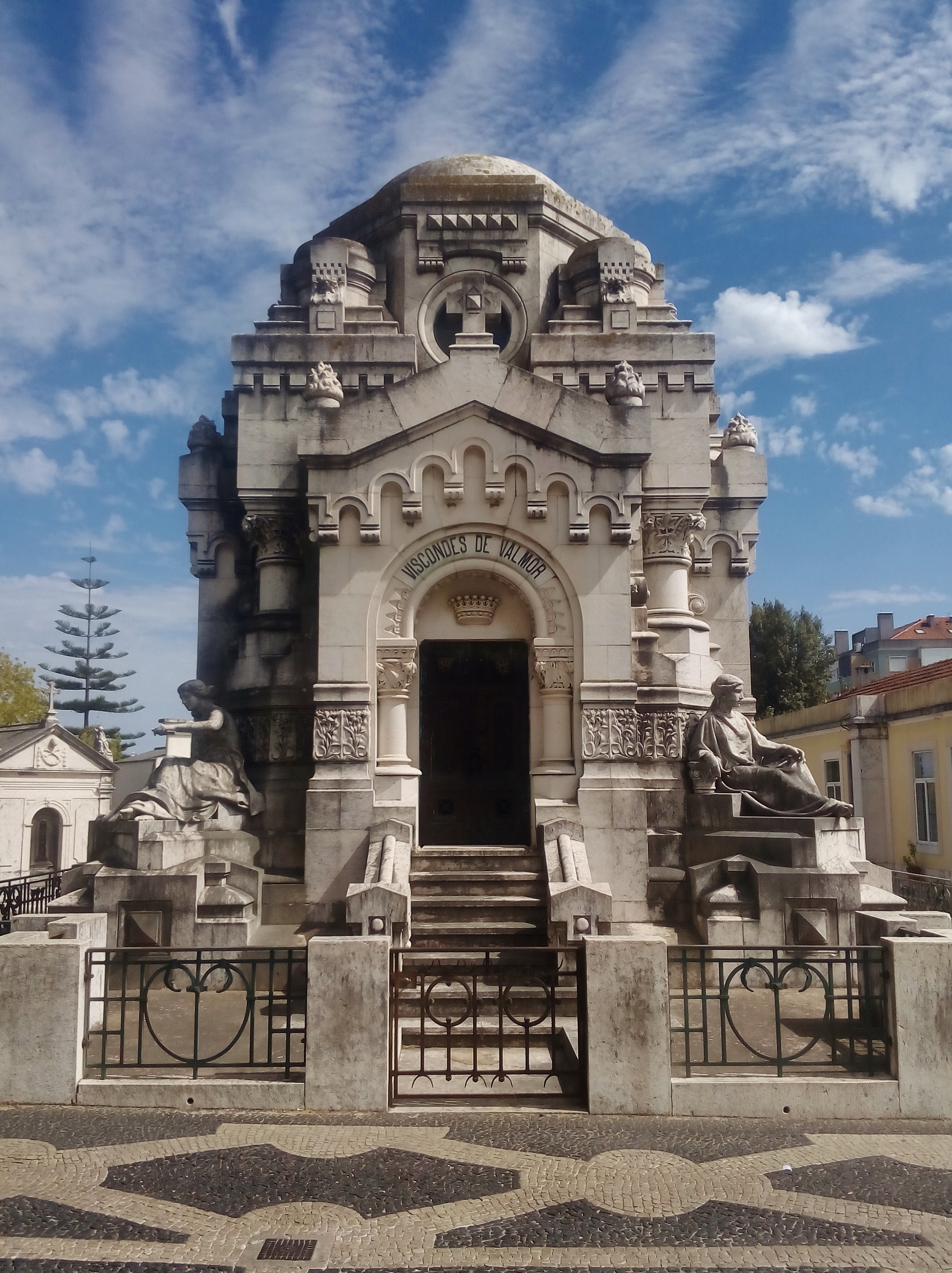
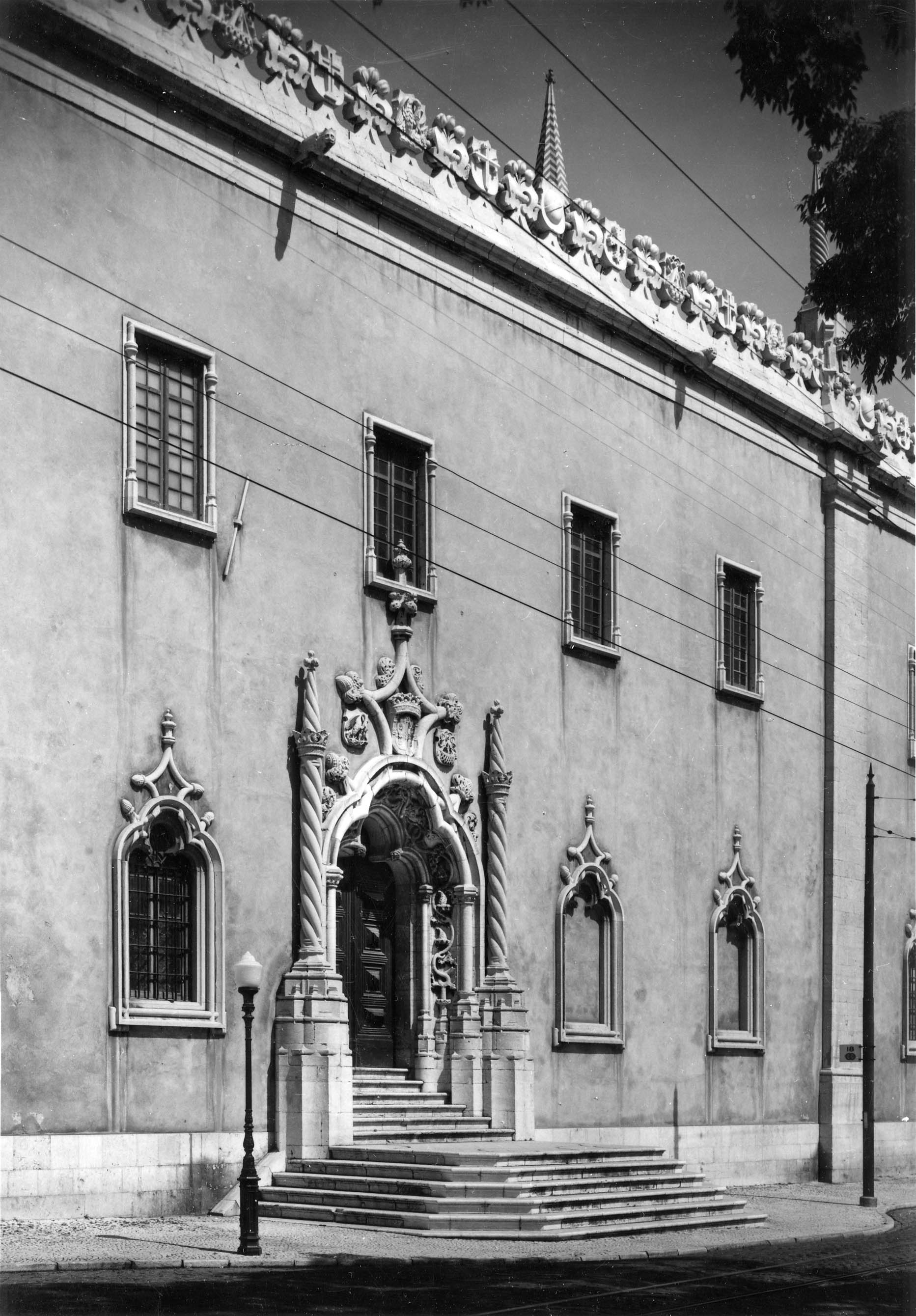
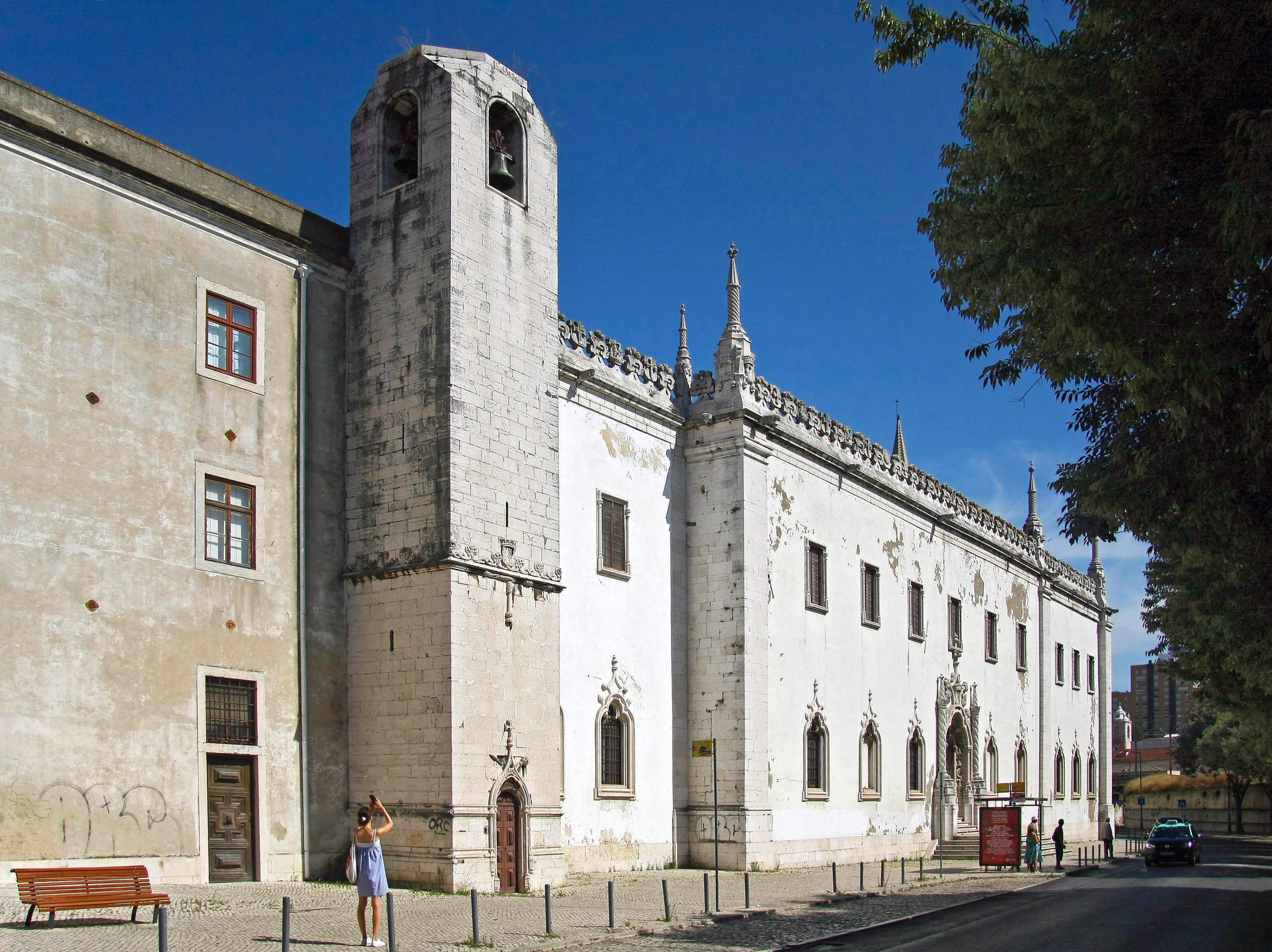
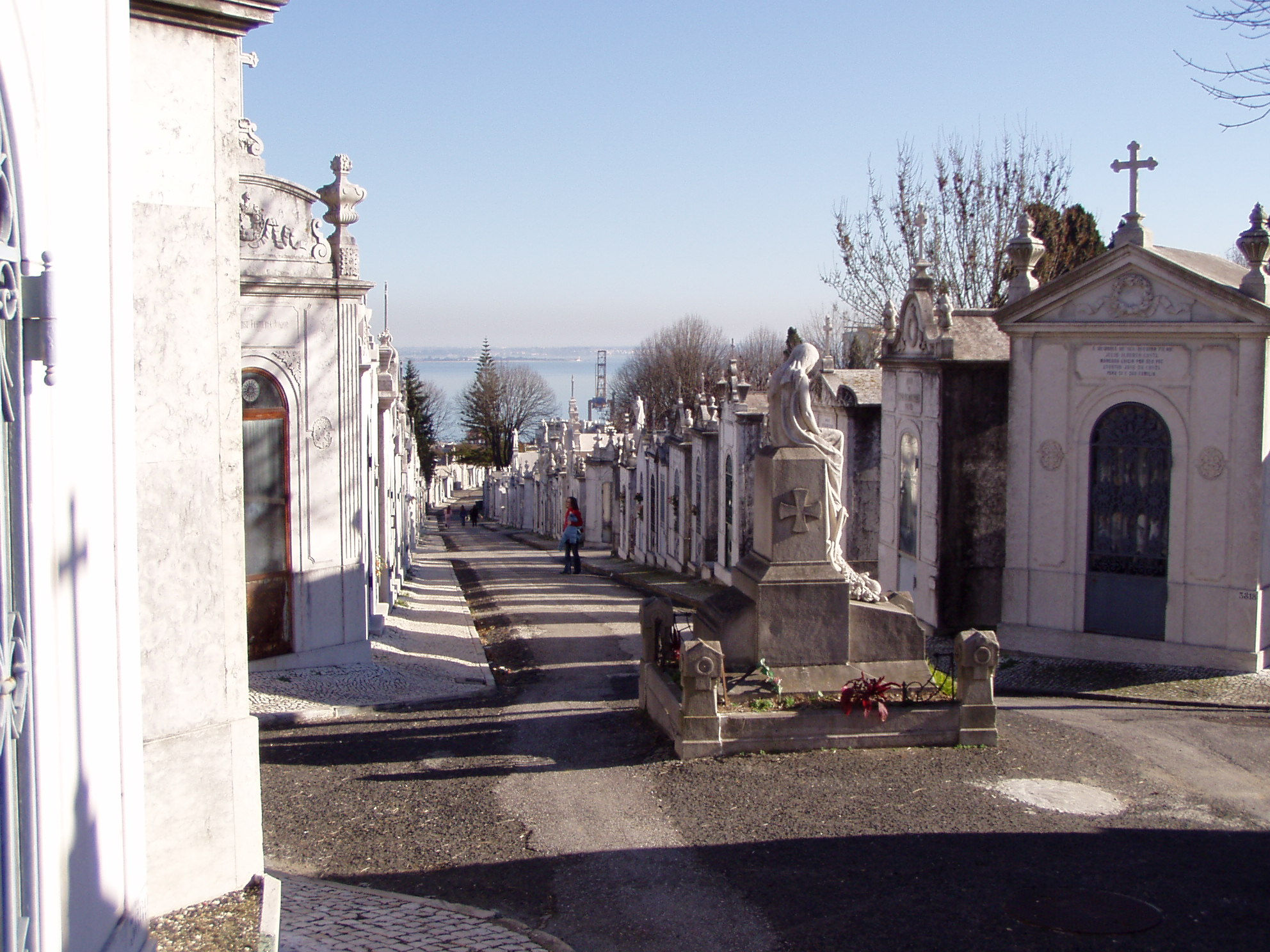
- Clockwise: Palace of the Marquises of Nisa; National Museum of the Azulejo; Jazigo dos Viscondes de Valmor; Alto de São João Cemetery; Manueline portal; Penha de França Church

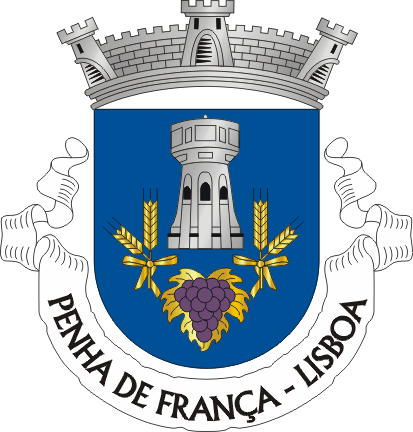
- Coat of arms

- Coordinates: 38.729°N 9.131°W
- Country: Portugal
- Region: Lisbon
- Metropolitan area: Lisbon
- District: Lisbon
- Municipality: Lisbon

Area
  - Total: 2.71 km^{2} (1.05 sq mi)

Population (2021)
  - Total: 28,475
  - Density: 10,500/km^{2} (27,200/sq mi)
- Time zone: UTC+00:00 (WET)
  - Summer (DST): UTC+01:00 (WEST)
- Website: www.jf-penhafranca.pt

Penha de França (Portuguese pronunciation: [ˈpɐɲɐ ðɨ ˈfɾɐ̃sɐ]) is a freguesia (civil parish) and typical quarter of Lisbon, the capital city of Portugal. Located in the historic center of Lisbon, Penha de França is north of São Vicente, east of Arroios, south of Areeiro, and west of Beato. The population in 2021 was 28,475.

== History ==
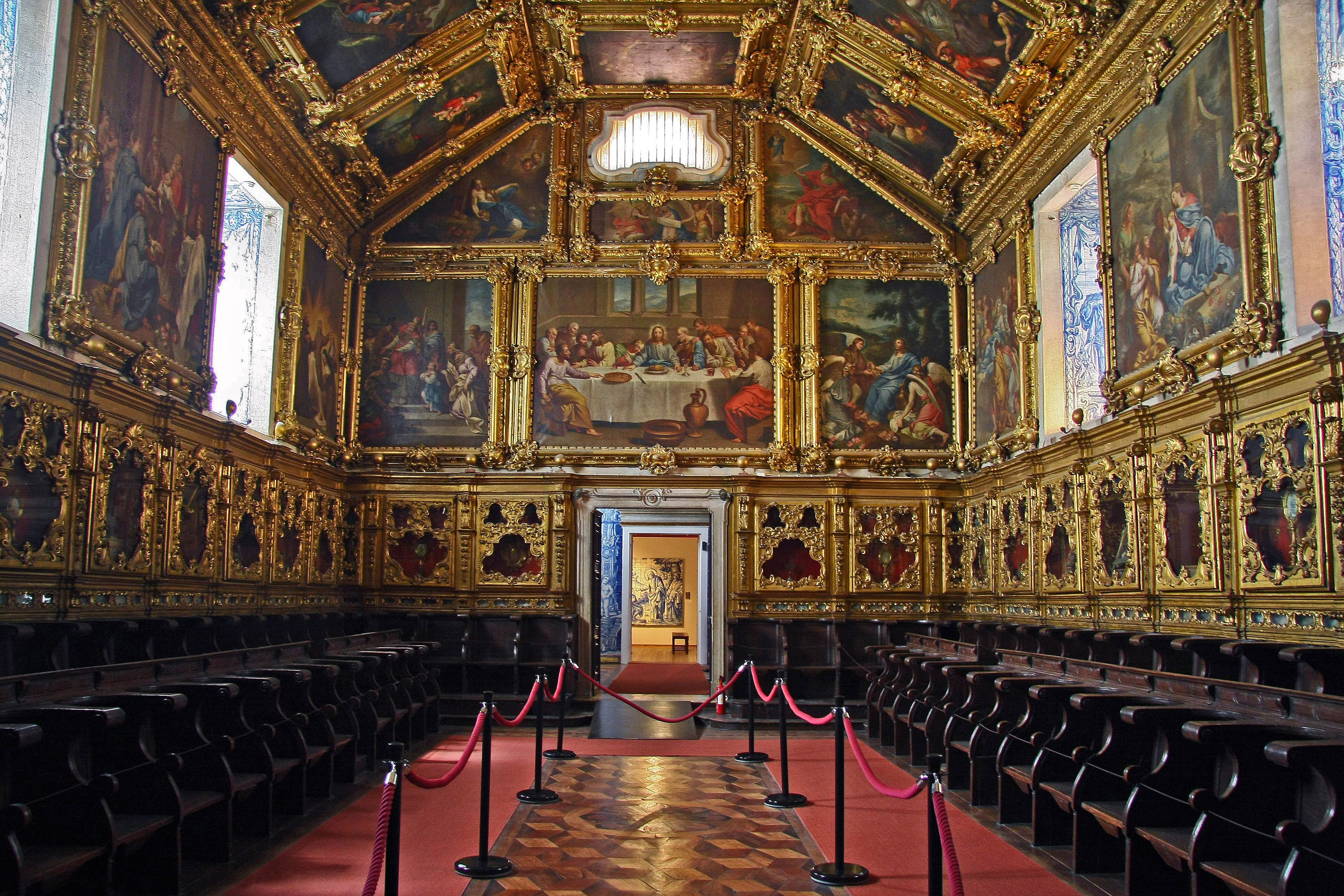
Madre de Deus Convent.

The Madre de Deus Convent was founded in 1509 by Queen Leonor of Viseu, wife of D. João II.

The Convent of Penha de França, which lends its name to this parish, was founded in 1598. Its territory originated from several medieval parishes within Lisbon's jurisdiction: Santo Estêvão de Alfama, Santa Justa, and Olivais. Situated 110 meters above sea level, the convent offers sweeping city views. It is the resting place for many members of the Portuguese nobility, such as D. Inês de Távora, wife of Francisco de Távora, and it houses works by Portuguese painter Pedro Alexandrino de Carvalho.

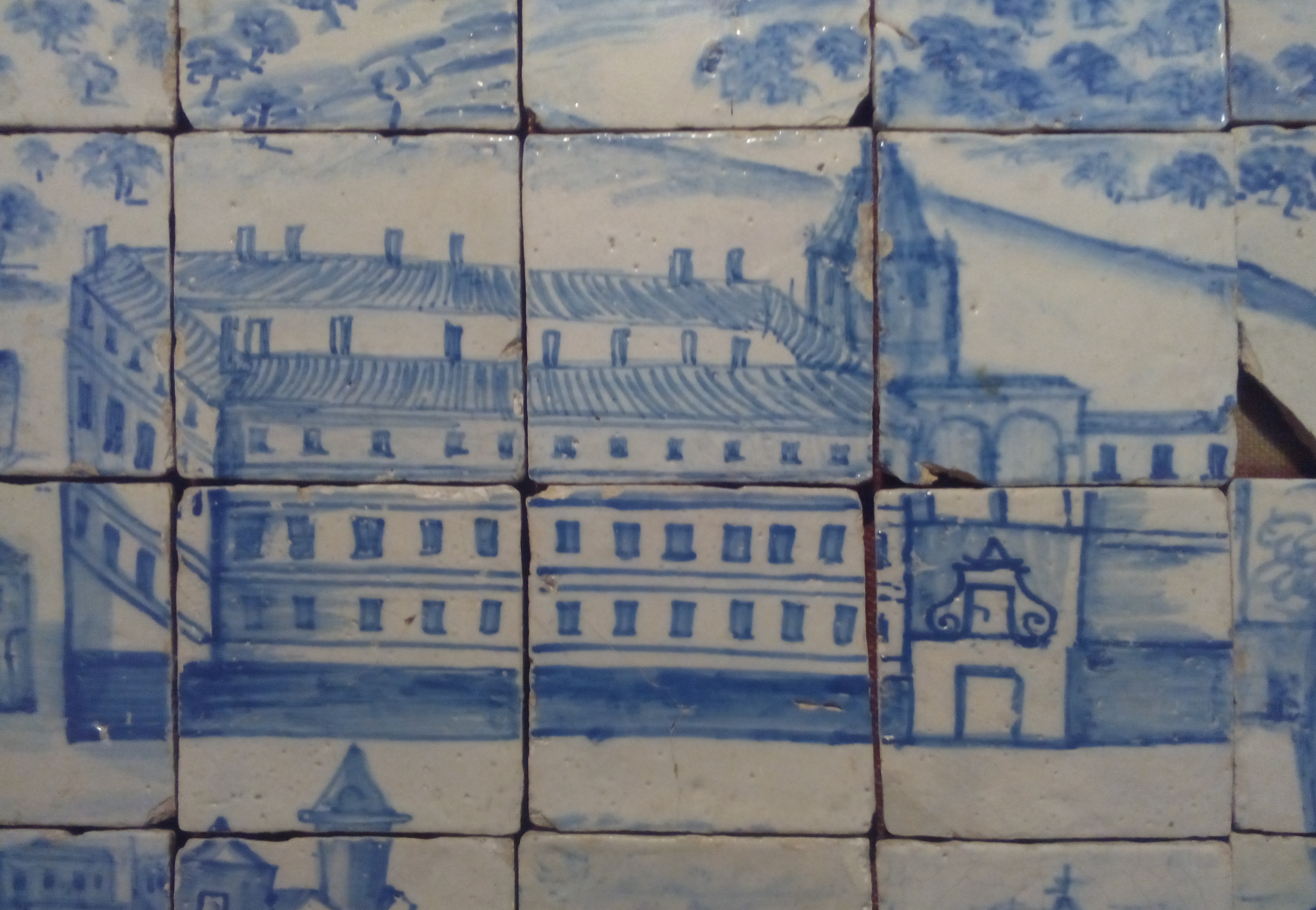
Azulejo depicting the convent of Santos-o-Novo in early 18th-century

In 1609, another convent was built, Santos-o-Novo, near the banks of the river Tagus. The convent was erected on the site of a 13th century monastery, built under the reign of D. João II.

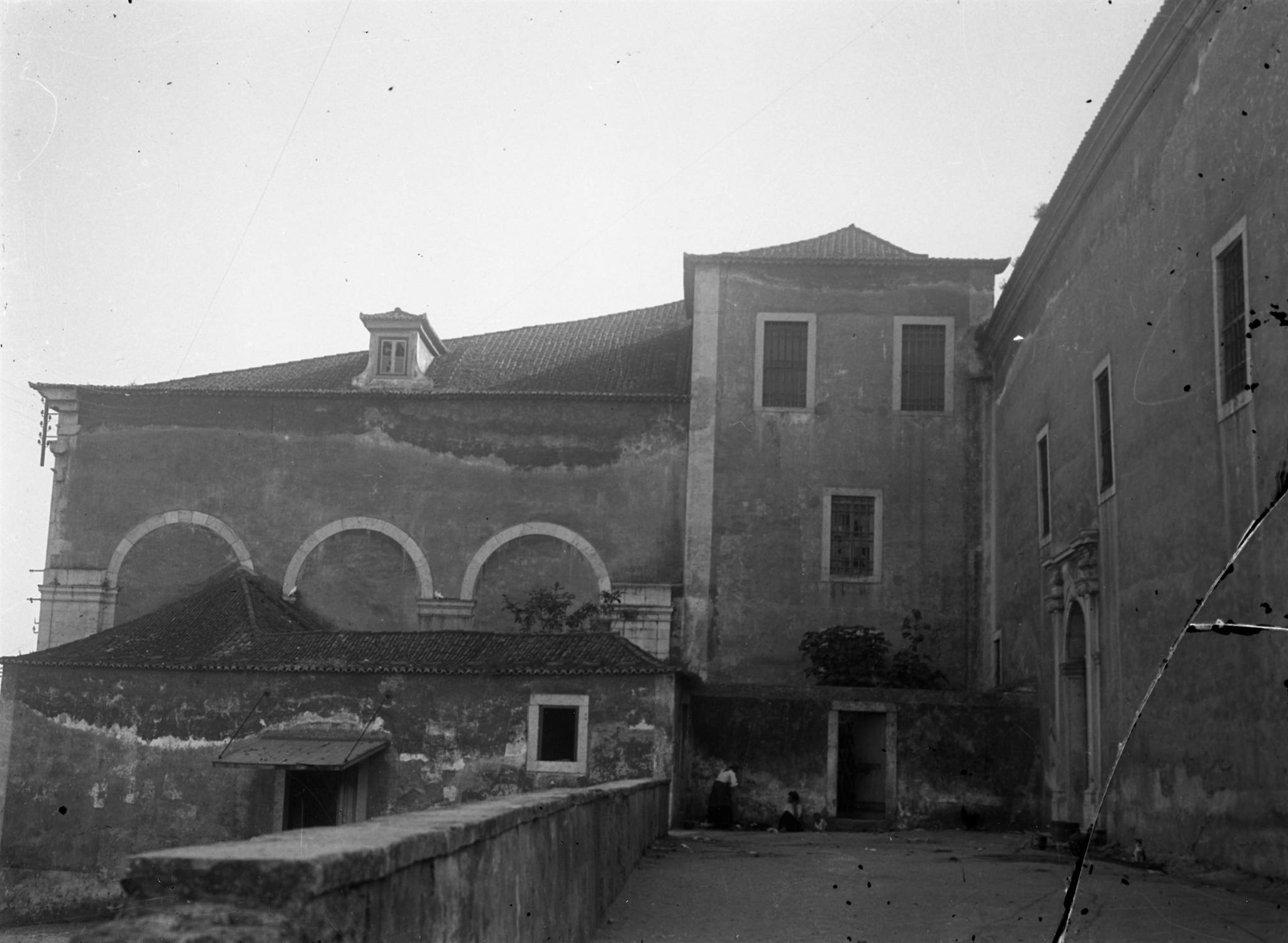
Convent of Santos-o-novo, 1900 ca.

In the 16th century, residential areas emerged around the convents, the Royal Palace, and the Mitra Palace (in Beato). In the 17th century, development centered around the Convent of Penha de França (now the General Command of the Polícia de Segurança Pública).

The 1755 earthquake led to the abandonment of many estates (including Pina, Coxo, and Bacalhau, among others) and manors (including Gadanho, Peixinhos, Alto da Eira, Santo António, and Machada) that were built in the area by Portuguese nobility.

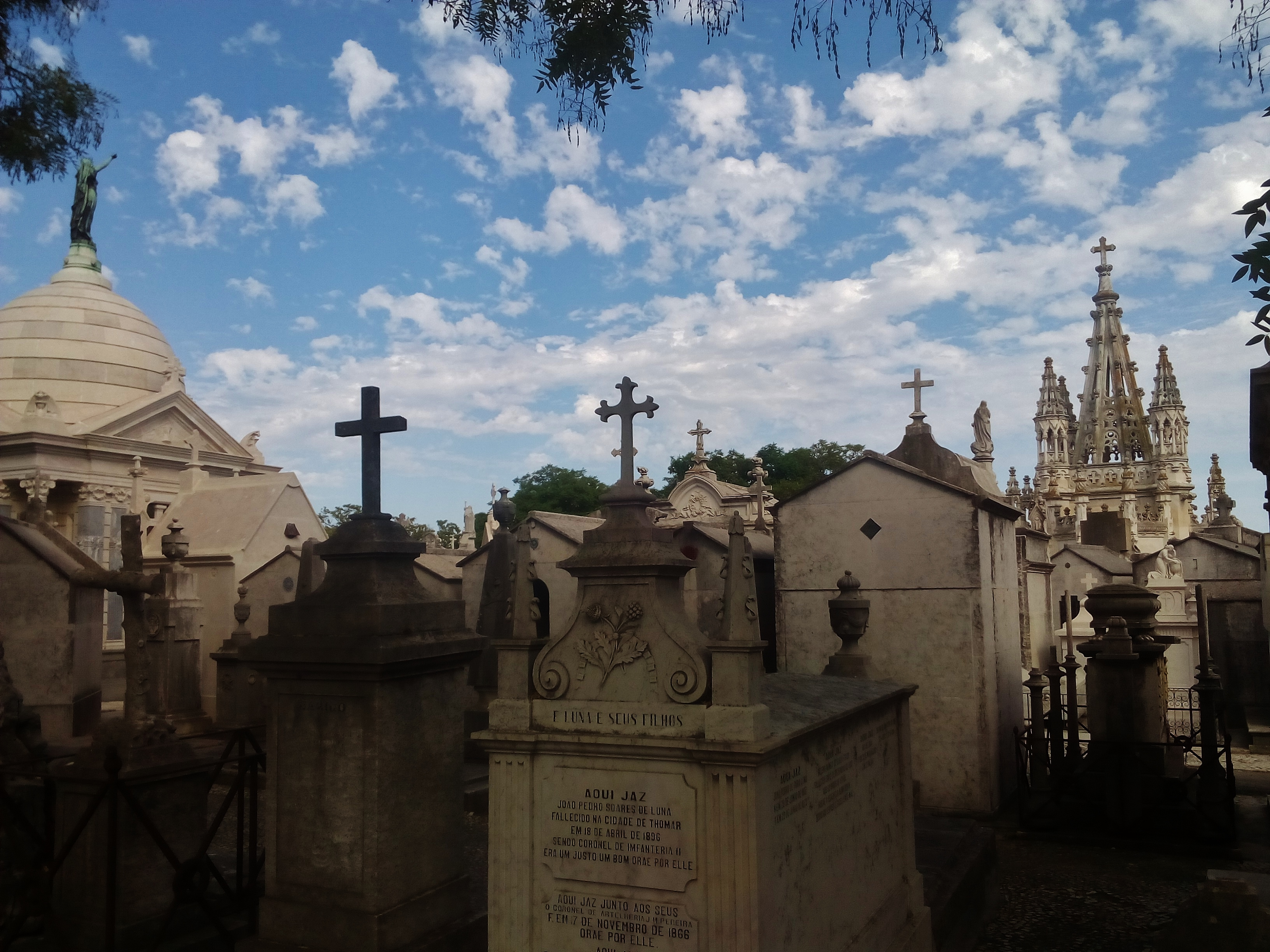
Alto de São João cemetery

Commissioned by Queen Maria II in 1833 following a cholera epidemic in Lisbon, the Alto de São João Cemetery served as the city's cemetery for over a century.

During the 19th century, factories sprang up in the valleys of Chelas and Xabregas, although the parish as a whole maintained a rustic character, especially in the less-populated areas away from the Tagus River. In fact, it remained a favored area for Lisbon residents to stroll, as described by Almeida Garrett in his 1846 work "Viagens na Minha Terra" (lit. Travels through my land).

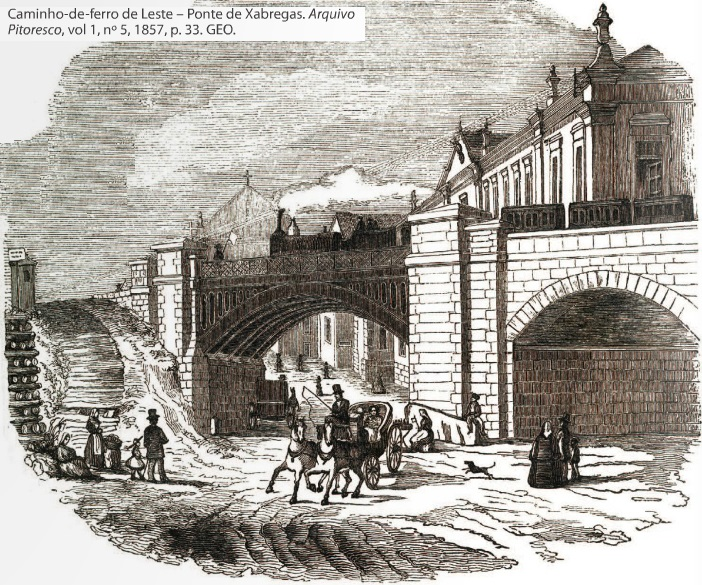
Drawing of Xabregas viaduct dating from 1857

In 1854, the Viaduto de Xabregas, serving Linha do Norte -- the most important railway line in Portugal -- was built. The structure consists of two sections: one with stone arches, spanning 36 meters, and a section with metal beams, extending another 15.6 meters. The metal beams were replaced in 1954.

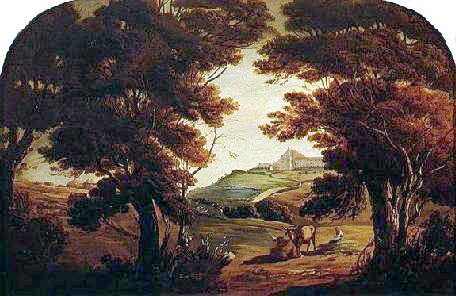
View of Penha de França in 1857, by Tomás da Anunciação

Portuguese Romantic artist Tomás da Anunciação painted Vista da Penha de França, a notable landscape painting of 1857 housed in the National Museum of Contemporary Art. The work contributed to Anunciação's appointment as a permanent professor. The painting depicts a rural view of mid-19th-century Lisbon, highlighting the old convent on the hill of Penha de França, framed by trees, oxen, and a peasant woman. It was part of the former National Museum of Fine Arts and Archaeology's collection since 1884.

In 1891 the former Caracol da Penha was renamed Rua Marques da Silva to honor João Marques da Silva, a local merchant who contributed to its expansion. It is one of the oldest streets in the parish, having been known as Calçada da Penha de França since at least 1710.

=== Twentieth century ===
Vila Cândida, constituted of 140 apartments across 35 two-story buildings and constructed by Cândido Sotto Mayor, was built in 1912. The vila would be later be given by Elsa Sotto Mayor Matos to the residents in 1974, following the revolution.

In 1916, the former "Travessa do Caracol da Penha" was renamed Rua dos Heróis de Quionga (lit. Quionga heroes street) to commemorate the fighters who, during World War I, recaptured the Quionga Triangle in Mozambique from the Germans. During the war, around 7,500 Portuguese soldiers had died on the African front.

On April 13, 1918, the freguesia of Penha de França was officially established, with areas ceded by the neighbouring parishes of Beato, Santa Engrácia, and São Jorge de Arroios. The name of the parish comes from its patron saint, Our Lady of Penha de França. On the first census, the parish had a population of 12,555 (of whom 1.12% were foreigners, 51.75% were females, and 52.97% were literate).

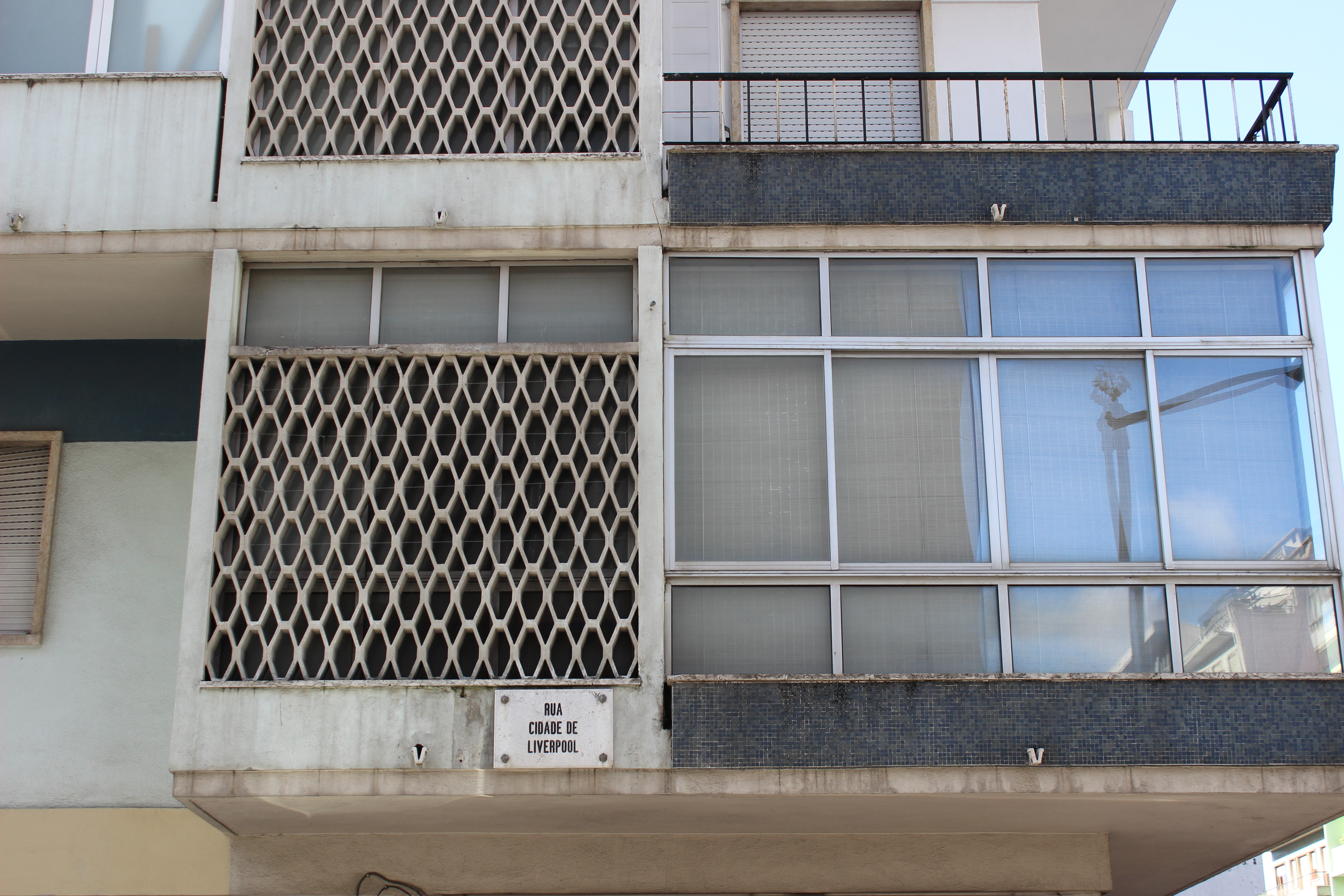
Typical ''varanda fechada'' in Rua cidade de Liverpool

In the 1920s the neighbourhoods of Andrade, Inglaterra (lit. England), and Colónias (lit. colonies) were built. They are nicknamed the "English neighbourhoods" because many of their streets are named after English cities such as Manchester; likewise, the "Colonies neighbourhood" has many streets named after former Portuguese colonies, such as Timor. Andrade is a Portuguese surname and the neighbourhood owes its name to the family of the entrepreneur who urbanised that part of the city, naming the streets after his wife and daughters.

The first crematorium in Portugal was built in the parish and opened in 1925; however, it closed in 1936 due to political pressures. The crematorium in the Alto de São João Cemetery was reopened in 1985.

Since 1929 an EPAL warehouse has been present in the Miradouro da Penha de França.

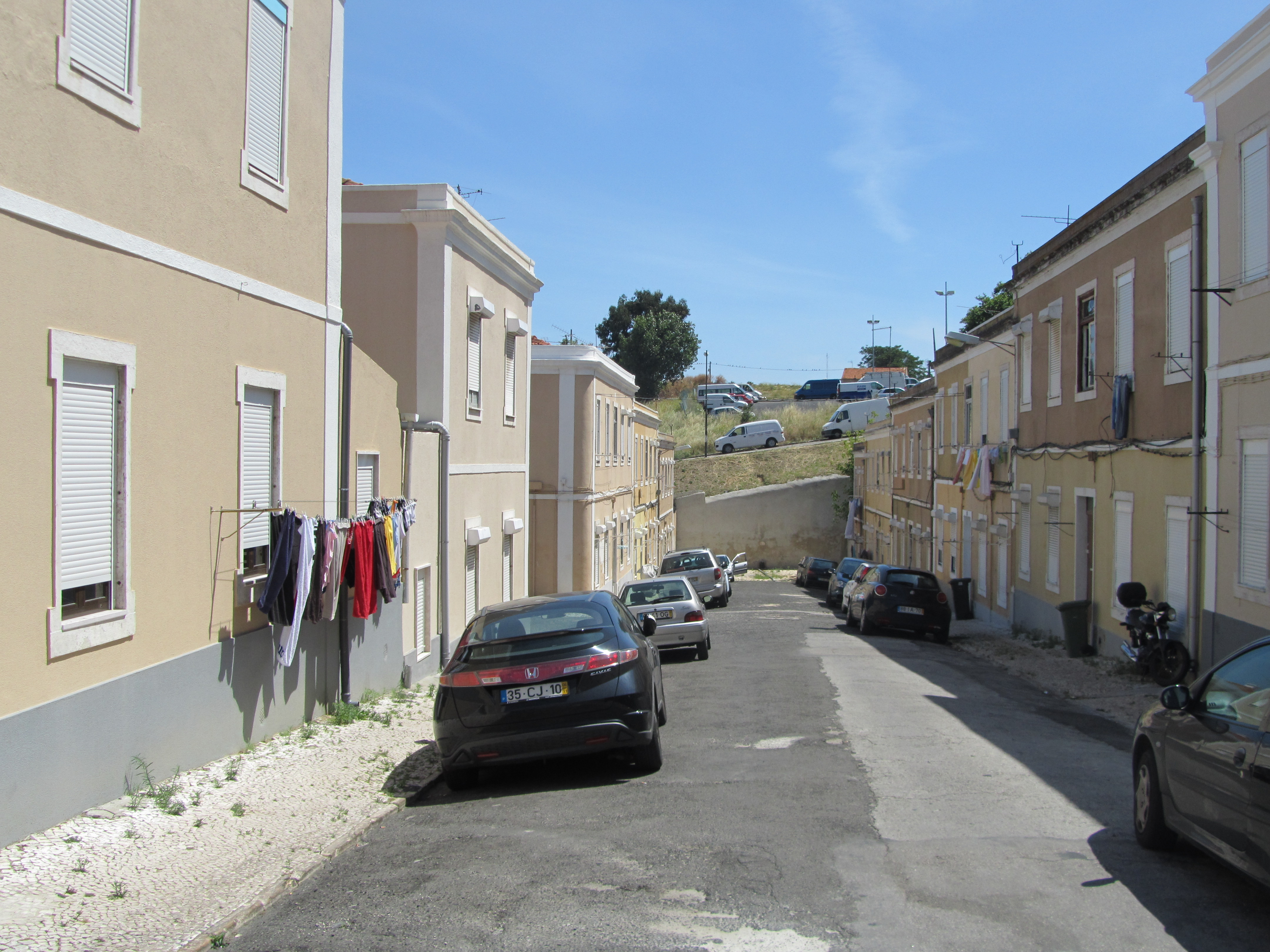
Street view of Vila Cândida, a rorker's village (vila operária) dating from the late XIX century

In 1930, the Avenida General Roçadas was named after José Augusto Alves Roçadas, officer of the Portuguese Army and a colonial administrator. It is one of the main avenues of the parish, and it is the location of one of the largest workers' villages in Lisbon: Vila Cândida, dating from the late 19th century. The Avenida Afonso III (lit. Afonso III avenue) opened to the public in 1932. The 1930 population census recorded 22,226 inhabitants in the parish, a +77.03% increase since 1920 (1.27% were foreigners, 55.01% were females, and 58.17% were literate). The parish continued to grow, registering a further population increase of 73% between 1930 and 1940. By the 1940 census, the parish had 38,455 inhabitants, a +73.02% increase since 1930 (of whom 1.27% were foreigners, 52.48% were females, 67.42% were literate, and 83.83% were Catholic). 881 residential buildings (or 36.33% of the parish's total buildings used for residential purposes) existing in 2021 were built between 1919 and 1945, coinciding with the demographic boom of this area of Lisbon. In 1935 the Quartel da Penha de França was the site of an attempted revolt against Salazar's regime by the fascist Movimento Nacional-Sindicalista. After the failed coup, the movement's leader, Francisco Rolão Preto, was exiled and fought in the Spanish Civil War on Francisco Franco's side.

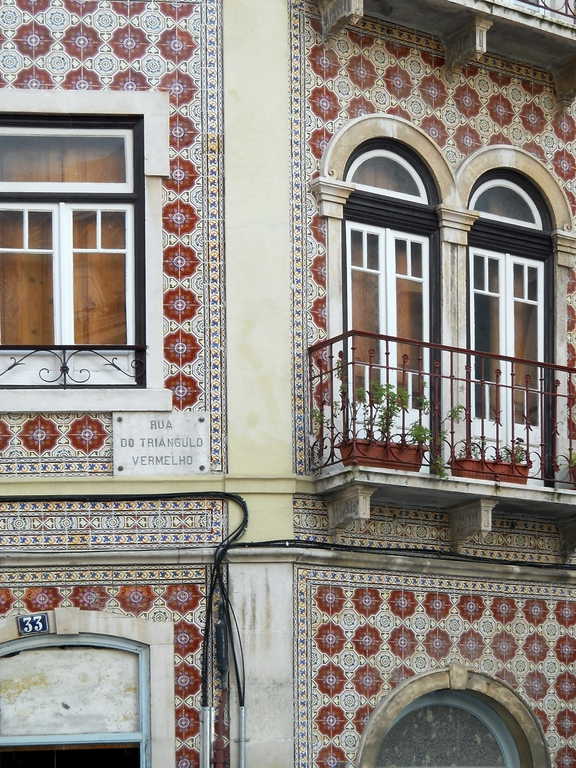
Azulejos adorning a house façade, a common view in the parish of Penha de França

In 1943 the Regimento de Artilharia Antiaérea N.º 1 was created in the parish. It is the unit within the Componente Fixa do Sistema de Forças (CFSF) with the mission of organizing, training, and maintaining the operational anti-aircraft artillery units of the Portuguese Army. It was later transferred to Queluz, where it has been hosted ever since, in barracks adjacent to the Palace of Queluz.

During 1948 the Avenida Infante Dom Henrique (lit. Prince Henry the Navigator avenue) opened. It is the largest avenue in Lisbon, stretching for 12 km along the river and passing through 7 parishes, amongst which there is also Penha de França.

The 1950 census was the last before the 1959 division of the parish in three separate entities. According to the 1950 census, the parish of Penha de França had 48,035 inhabitants, a +24.91% increase since 1930 (1.27% were foreigners, 53.16% were females, 72.88% were literate, and 90.09% were Catholic). With an area of little over 3 km^{2,} the population density of the parish stood at around 15,700 inhabitants per square kilometer, almost 20 times the population density recorded for Hong Kong in 1950.

The parish was divided in 1959, creating the parishes of Alto do Pina and São João.

The parish has housed the National Museum of the Azulejo since 1965 in the Madre de Deus Convent. One of the last marriages celebrated in the church prior to its transformation into a museum was the one between businessman and billionaire Alexandre Soares dos Santos and Maria Teresa Canas Mendes da Silveira e Castro, in 1957.

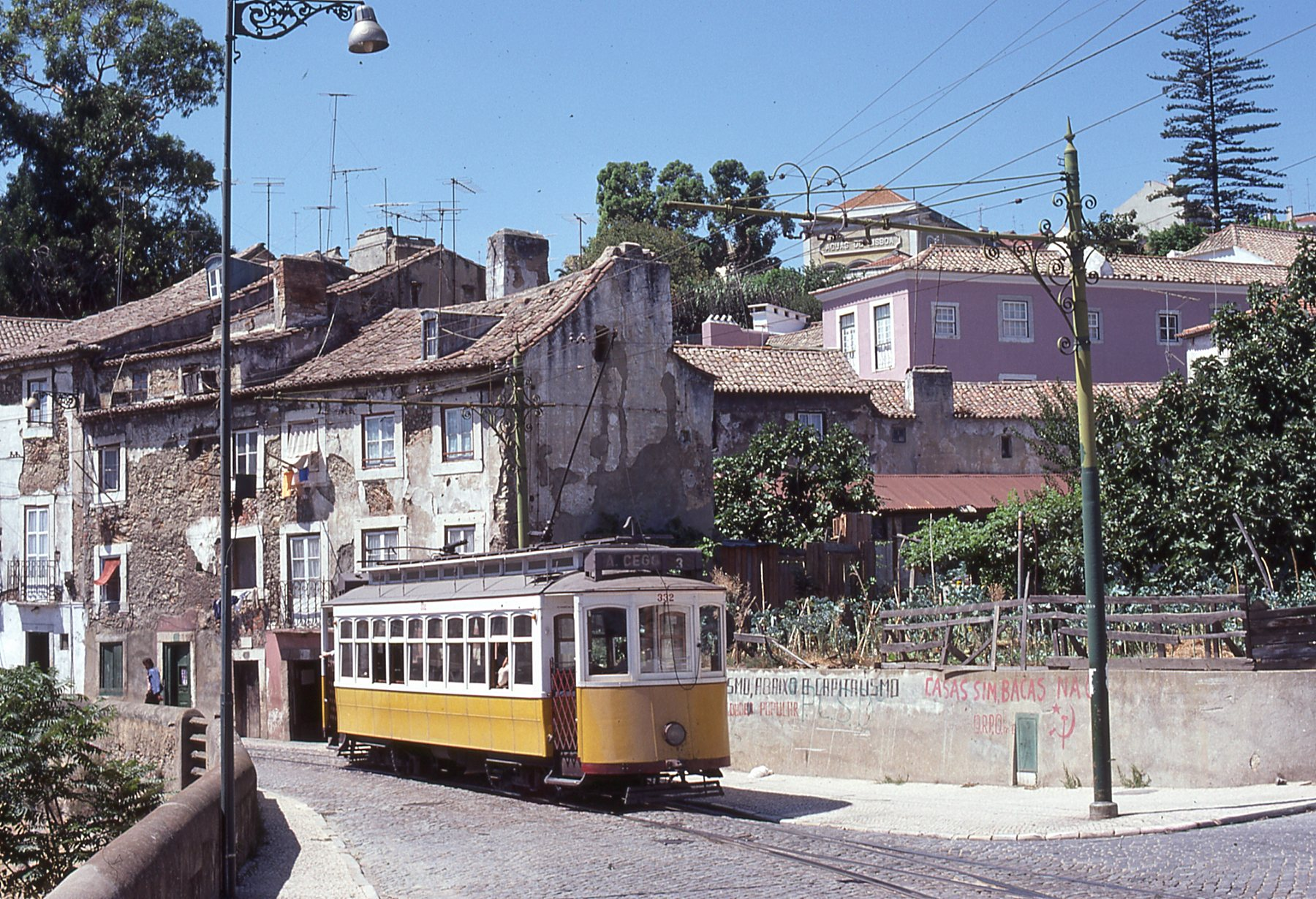
Penha de França street view in 1977: a tram runs near a slogan stating "homes yes, shacks no"

After a surge in shanty towns in the 1960s, two government-funded residential towers, known as Torres do Alto da Eira, were built in 1973. They were designed by architects Francisco Silva Dias and Antonieta Silva Dias, and have a capacity to house 370 people in 132 dwellings. They are still owned by the municipality, where residents pay a controlled rent of €52.14 per month. Due to very poor maintenance, the two towers faced the risk of being demolished in 2008 but were later deemed to be recoverable; in 2012 the city council of Lisbon invested €4.5 million for the total rehabilitation of the dwellings and of the surrounding areas.

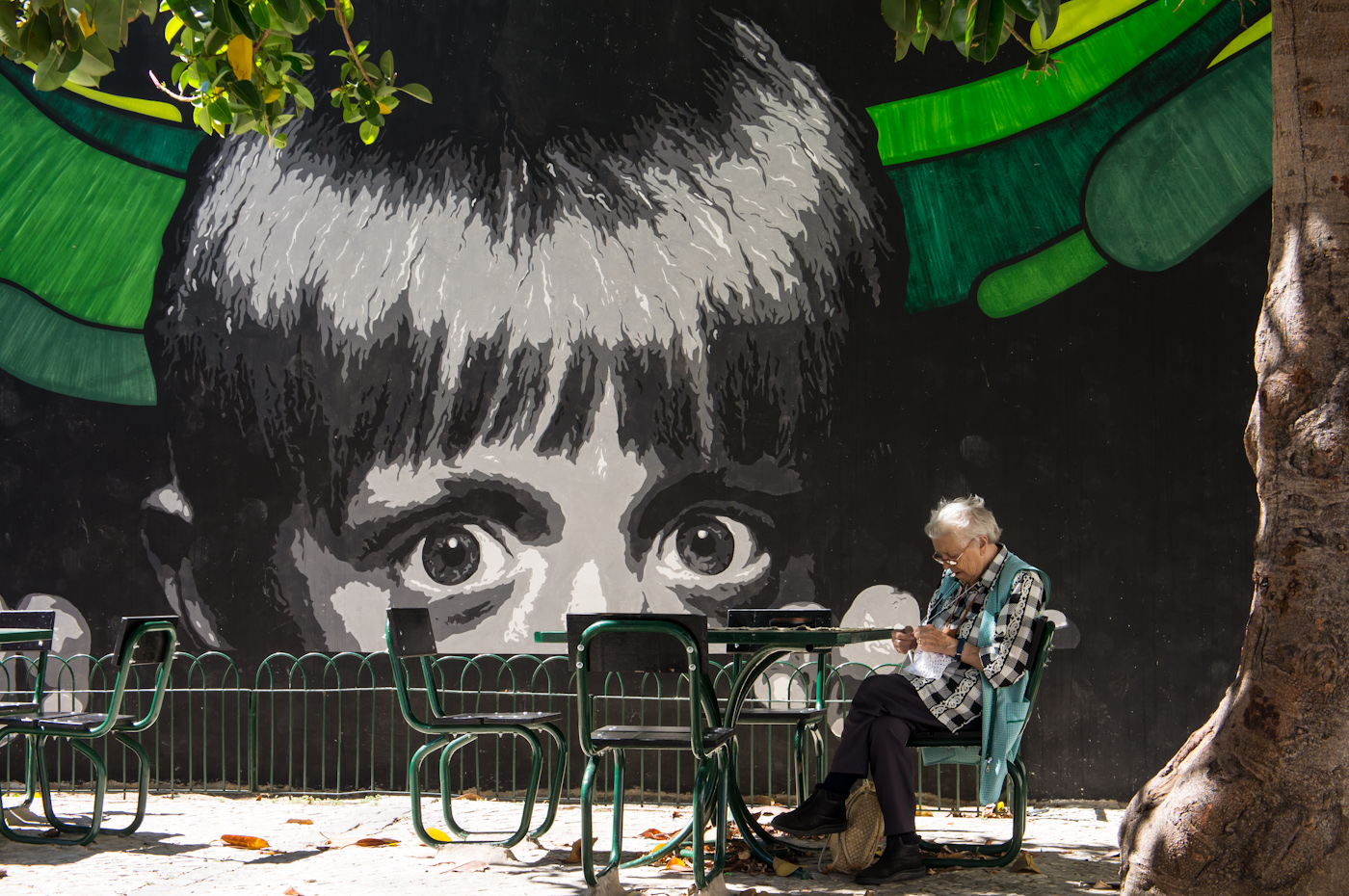
Street art by Daniel Eime at the feet of Alto da Eira towers, 2012

A fire in 1975 killed two people in the shanty town of Curraleira. Hosting a large Romani community and located on the eastern border of the parish (in the portion formerly part of São João), 69 shacks were also destroyed. In 2018 and 2023 two murals were painted to remember the accident, and a memorial cross was erected. The same year, some families built the Bairro do Horizonte, with far better conditions than the old sheds.

Tinturaria Portugália was the first of many industries to go bankrupt following a period of political instability and the independence of the last Portuguese colonies (namely Angola and Mozambique). The company had been established in the late 19th century and closed in 1976. All major industries would end up leaving Penha de França by 2000, due to bankruptcy or relocation outside the city's boundaries.

In 1983 the Rotunda das Olaias (lit. Olaias roundabout) opened. Further road construction resulted in the Viaduto de Santa Apolónia; this road opened in 1998 to better organise the traffic between the waterfront and the inner part of the parish, bridging the railway line "Linha do Norte".

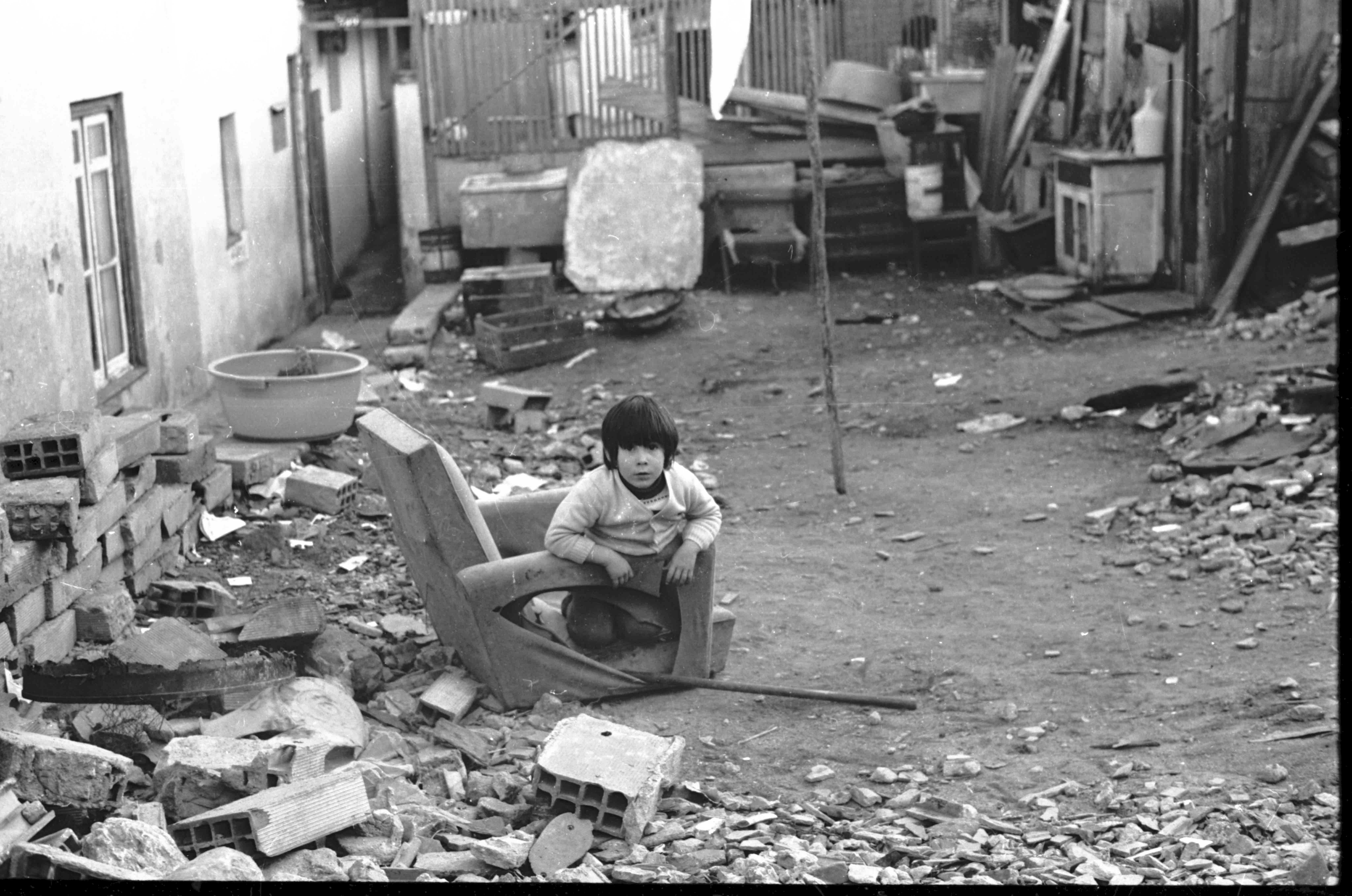
Child in a shanty town in Lisbon, second half of the XIX century

To eradicate shanty towns and provide all residents with access to tap water, electricity, and sanitation, the Programa Especial de Realojamento (PER) was implemented in 1993. It was estimated that in 1993 almost 40,000 people lived in shanty towns in Lisbon (9.1% of the city population). Between 1993 and the early 2000s, more than 32,000 families and more than 132,000 people were relocated across the whole country; almost 1,000 slums were destroyed across 28 municipalities and almost 35,000 government-funded dwellings were built in their stead. In Lisbon, more than 9,000 public dwellings were built, totaling an investment of over €600 million. Penha de França received significant investment from the PER, which contributed to the construction of the neighbourhoods of Quinta do Lavrado and Bairro do Vale de Santo António between 2000 and 2001. A fire in July 2001 destroyed four shacks and underlined the importance of an immediate relocation of the residents.In 1993, 1,511 families in Penha de França lived in shanty towns; by 2013, twenty years later, that figure was down to just 30 families. The shanty towns were completely demolished shortly after the relocation was completed.

=== Twenty-first century ===
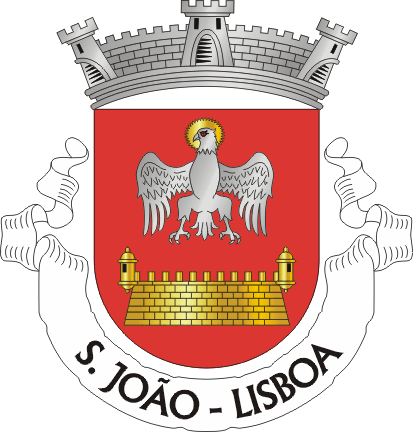
Ancient coat of arms of the former parish of São João, extinguished in 2013

In 2009, to celebrate the ratification of the Treaty of Lisbon, 27 trees were planted in a roundabout in the parish, symbolizing the (at the time) 27 countries in the European Union.

With an administrative reform in 2012, the parish of São João merged into Penha de França. The parish nearly quadrupled its area and more than doubled its population; the change also brought into Penha de França a small strip of land previously belonging to the parish of Beato.

The dovecotes of the Curraleira neighbourhood, which had been used to train carrier pigeons, were demolished in 2014 to build an electricity substation in Alto de São João.

New spaces were added to Penha de França library during 2018, so that it had more than 5000 books available for public use. During 2019, the new bus line 37B began its route in the parish, connecting it to neighbouring Beato. A "street fest festival" was hosted in Alameda for a total of nine days.

In 2020, 42 Lisboa opened in the parish, the first facility offering higher education within the parish. It is an innovative school and, although private, is entirely funded by sponsors so no fees are charged to students.

Additional parking places were built to address demand: 160 places in Mouzinho Albuquerque avenue, more in the renovation and complete refurbishment of EB Arquitecto Victor Palla. A new parking lot for 125 vehicles was opened in 2022.

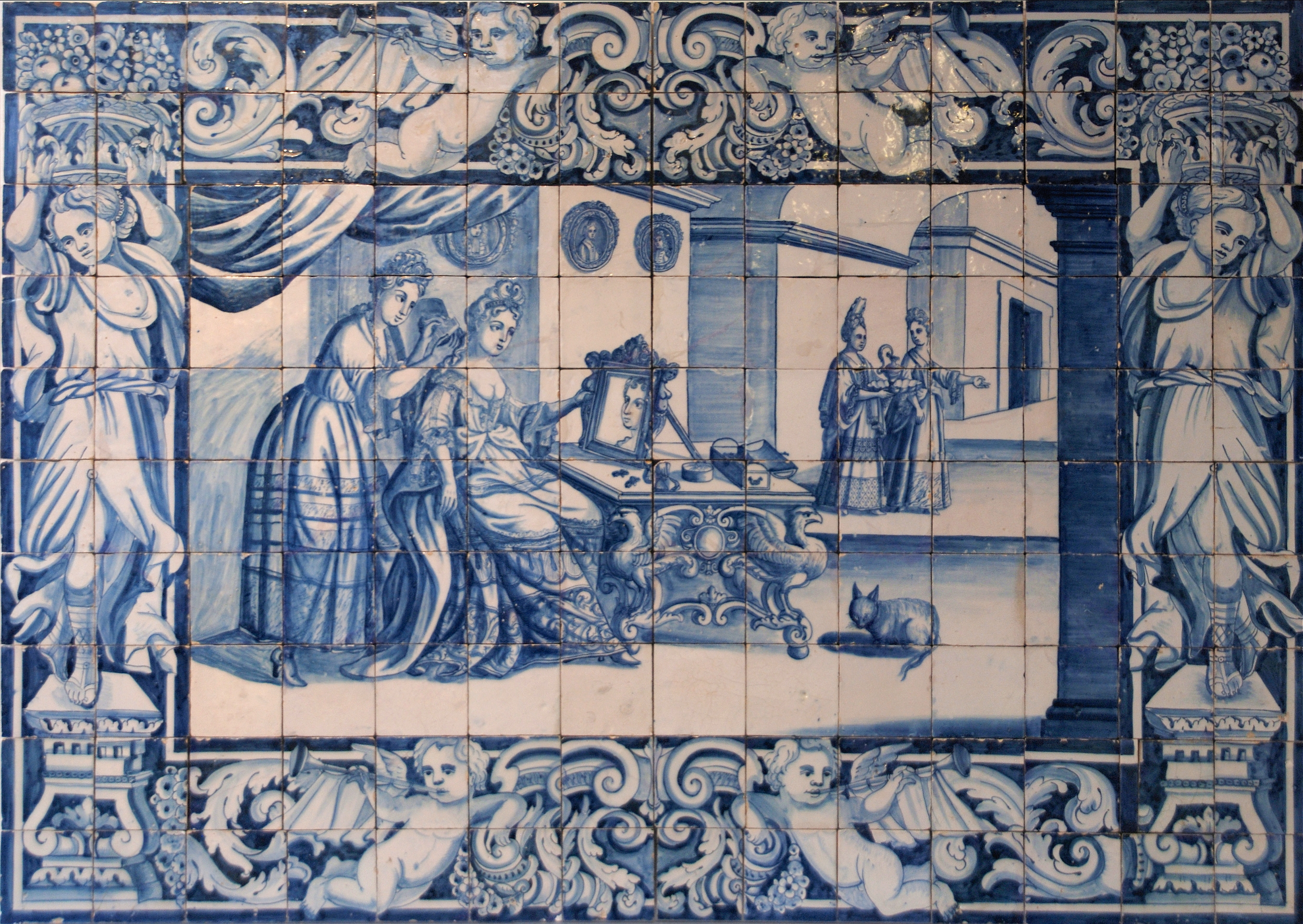
17th azulejo century panel

The parish of Penha de França hosted a 2022 celebration by the Filipino community, commemorating its independence from Spain. The "biggest street art work" in Portugal was created in July 2022, decorating 3.8 km of the wall separating the bike lane in Avenida Infante D.Henrique from the port of Lisbon. The parish hosted the Regador Festival in 2023, aimed at increasing green spaces in the area; the new garden of Caracol da Penha opened in the same year. During August 2023, 170 volunteers were mobilised in the parish to host international pilgrims for World Youth Day.

A new public health centre, Unidade de Saude de Sapadores-Graça, is expected to open in 2024. It is planned to serve around 15,000 people.

== Demographics ==
=== Historical resident population (before the 2012 Administrative Reform) ===
Penha de França area before and after the 2012 Portuguese administrative reform

The resident population recorded according to censuses carried over the years is shown in the following tables for both parishes that today constitute Penha de França. The ancient parish of Penha de França lost 15,640 people from 1960 to 2011 or 55.03% of its 1960 population, not having recorded a single population gain since 1960. Similarly, the ancient parish of São João lost 17,279 people or 53.22% of its population from 1960 to 2011, with major population losses recorded in the 1990s (-22.3%).

Penha de França (ancient)

Historical population
Year	Pop.	±%
1960	28,420	—
1970	23,798	−16.3%
1981	22,772	−4.3%
1991	17,885	−21.5%
2001	13,722	−23.3%
2011	12,780	−6.9%
Source: INE

São João

Historical population
Year	Pop.	±%
1960	32,466	—
1970	27,744	−14.5%
1981	24,889	−10.3%
1991	21,960	−11.8%
2001	17,073	−22.3%
2011	15,187	−11.0%
Source: INE

=== Current resident population (after the 2012 Administrative Reform) ===
The 2021 Portuguese census recorded the first demographic growth of the parish since 1960. From 2011 to 2021, the parish gained 508 people, recording a growth of +1.82%.

Former Parishes			Current Parish			
Parish	Population (2011)	Area (km^{2})	Parish	Population in 2011	Population in 2021	Area (km^{2})
Penha de França (ancient)	12,780	0.68	Penha de França	27,967	28,475	2.71
São João	15,187	1.51	Penha de França	27,967	28,475	2.71

=== Demographic statistics ===
==== Age ====
The last censuses show that the parish's population is aging at a fast pace: in 2021, 19.91% of the population was below 25 while almost a quarter (23.12%) of the residents were 65 or older.

Distribution of Population by Age Groups
Year	0-14 Years	0-14 Years %	15-24 Years	15-24 Years %	25-64 Years	25-64 Years %	> 65 Years	> 65 Years %
2021	3,076	10.80%	2,593	9.11%	16,222	56.97%	6,584	23.12%

==== Religion ====
Religion in Penha de França (Census 2021)
1. Catholicism (58.1%)
2. Protestantism (2.77%)
3. Jehovah's Witnesses and Other Christian (2.44%)
4. Orthodoxy (1.36%)
5. Islam (2.78%)
6. Hinduism (2.00%)
7. Buddhism (0.77%)
8. Judaism (0.08%)
9. Other religions (0.75%)
10. No religion (28.9%)

The parish is predominantly Catholic (58.1%), but 64.71% of the population aged 15 or above identify as some denomination of Christianity as of 2021. Around 29% of the population is non-religious. The presence of minor religions such as Islam, Hinduism and Buddhism (5.55% of the population amongst the three) is probably due to an increasing community of people coming from India, Pakistan, Bangladesh or Nepal.

==== Immigration ====
The 2021 census showed that 14.93% of the population of the parish was born outside Portugal (foreigners comprised 17.34% of the male population). The most common countries of birth were Brazil (1843 people), the Indian Subcontinent (1163 people) and PALOP countries (1053 people). Of the Portuguese nationals born abroad, the most common countries of birth were PALOP countries (807 people) and Brazil (523 people), all countries having historical migratory ties with Portugal. The total population would have decreased for the sixth census in a row were it not for the increase in immigration.

27.6% of the parish's population had lived abroad for at least one year as of 2021, with Brazil, EU countries, and the Indian Subcontinent being the most commonly cited countries of previous residence.The majority of those having lived in Angola and Mozambique (978 people) entered Portugal in the 1970s (637 people or 65.13%), following the independence of the two former colonies (so called retornados). Those coming from countries hosting large Portuguese emigrant communities such as France, Spain, Germany, Switzerland, Luxembourg or Belgium (871 people) have mostly entered Portugal after 1991 (77.3%), probably due to the development of the Portuguese economy since its accession to the EU. Interestingly, 41% of the Portuguese nationals in Penha de França who have lived in the UK returned to Portugal after 2016 (following the Brexit referendum).

In 2023, the parish started a new service to provide phone assistance to migrants who do not yet speak Portuguese, offering them the possibility to ask for information in their own languages. In addition, free Portuguese language courses were also introduced in 2023.

== Education ==
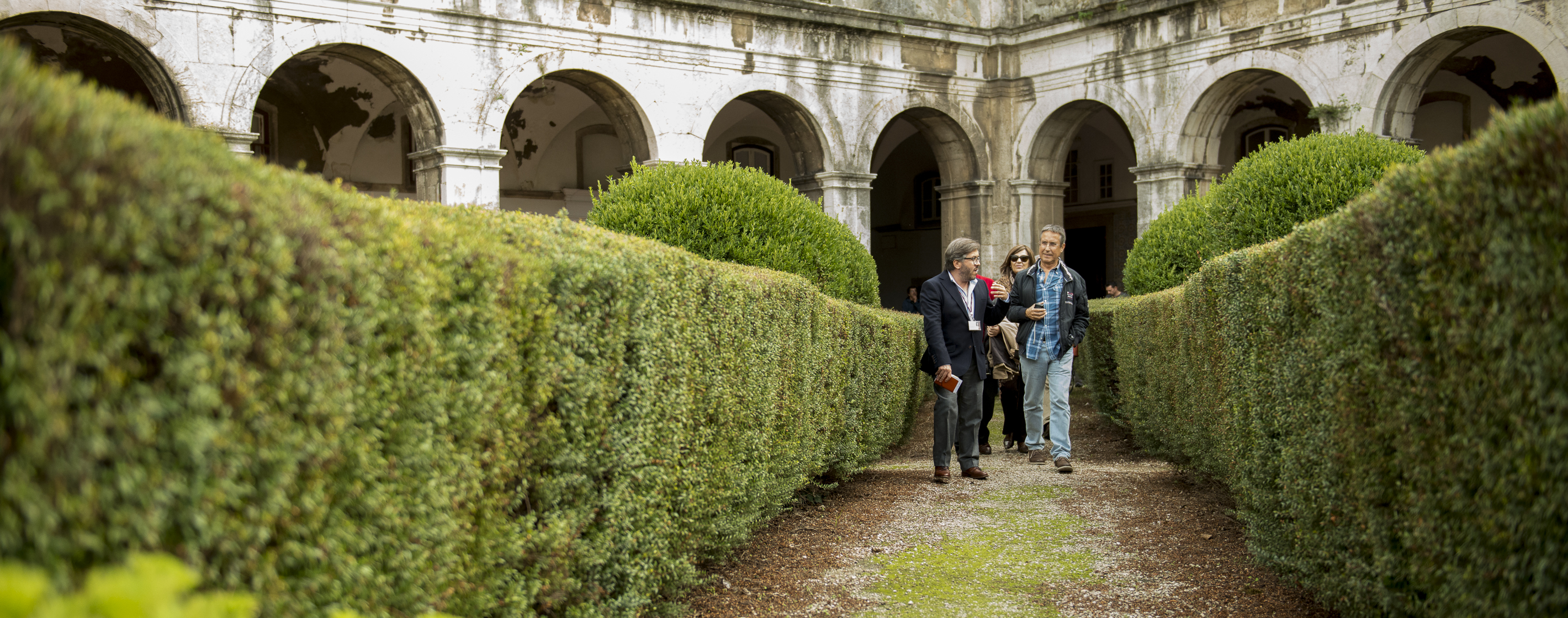
Santos-o-novo convent, ancient monastery now used as a student accommodation

According to the latest census in 2021, the proportion of people in Penha de França aged 15–24 who had completed the erceiro ciclo do ensino básico (schooling up to age 14) and who were not currently enrolled in the educational system was 43.91%. This is considerably higher than in Lisbon as a whole (35.06%).

In the same year, there were 550 illiterate residents in the parish, of whom 68% were females. The proportion of residents who lacks basic literary skills has been steadily decreasing and as of 2021 stood at 2.08%; for comparison, it stood at 3.19% ten years earlier in the 2011 census. The decrease in the number of illiterate people is probably due to the progressive ageing and subsequent death of the older generations, who form the overwhelming majority of illiterates in Portugal.

In fact, the educational attainment of the resident population increases in younger generations. Of those aged 15 or more not having a qualification – meaning that they did not complete even basic schooling up to age 9 or primeiro ciclo - 571 (or 44.3% of the total) were older than 65; amongst those aged 15–34 the people in the same category were 261 or 20.9% of the total of those holding no qualifications. The proportion of those not holding any qualification (5.07%) or having completed schooling only up to 14 (36.55%) was markedly lower for those aged 15–34 (respectively 3.49% and 21.3%) than for those 65 or older (respectively 8.67% and 68.22%). Regardless of age, the proportion of those having completed education at least up to 14 years old stood at 73.93% for Penha de França parish, lower than the value recorded for Lisbon (77.21%). The proportion of those having studied up to 17 years old - thus completing the secondary school - stood at 59.53% regardless of age, an increase of 17 percentage points from 2011 data. The improvement in education attainment indicators for the populations also means that the proportion of those who have not completed any educational step has decreased to 5.07% regardless of age (Lisbon as a whole: 4.24%).

== Economy ==
=== Employment ===
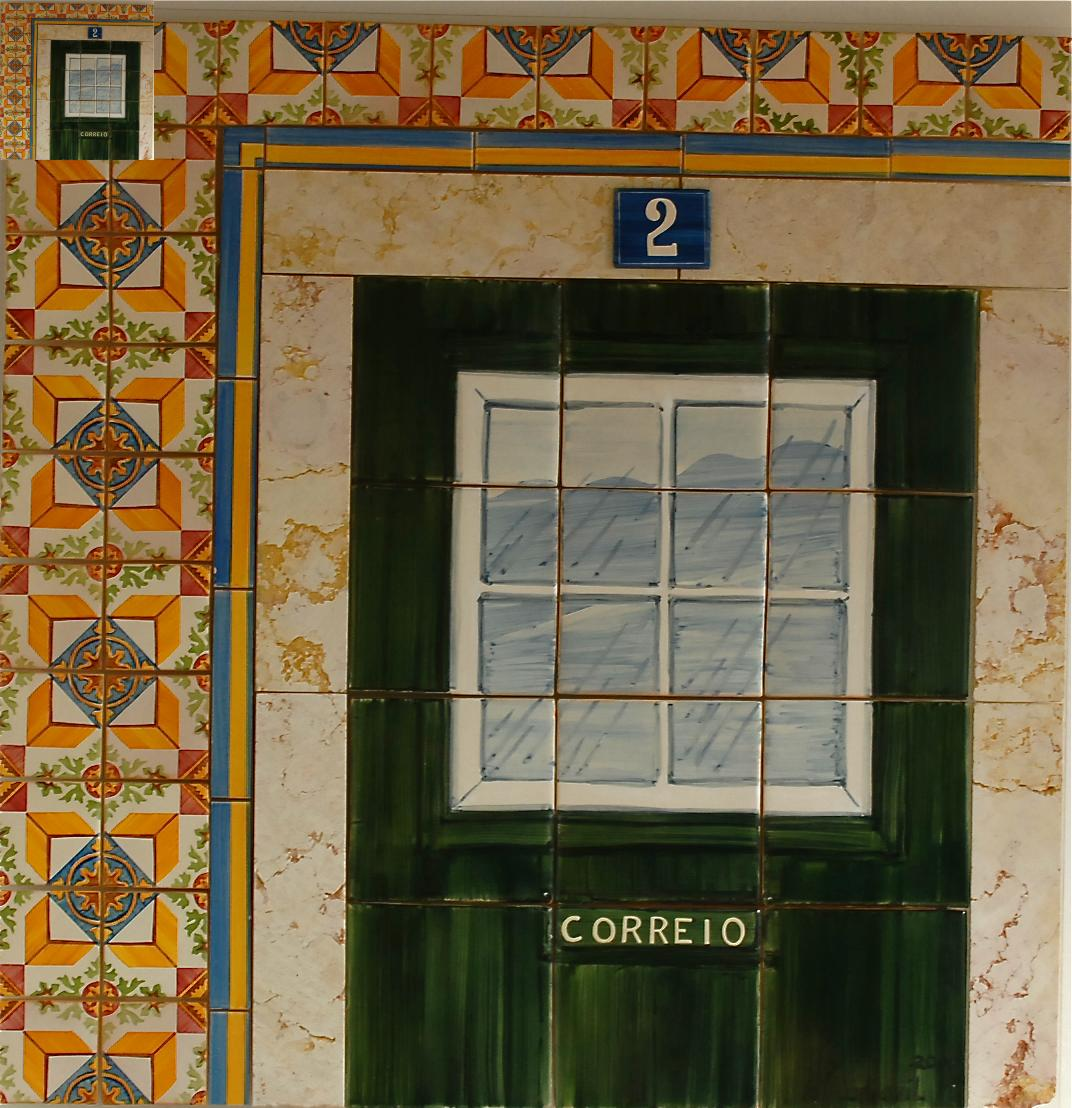
A Traditional Portuguese House (Drawn on tiles)

In 2021, the parish of Penha de França had 1467 unemployed residents. Of these, 41.58% received a state-fund subsidy or pension (compared to 41.34% in the city of Lisbon). The unemployment rate in the parish (10.19%) is considerably higher than those of Lisbon and of Portugal as a whole (8.13%). Amongst youth aged 15–24 the unemployment rate in 2021 in the parish stood at 20.84%, copmared to 9.24% for the entirety of Portugal. Of the 12,926 parish residents who were employed in 2021, 72.44% were employees and 12.32% were independent workers.

2021 Census data	Age group								
2021 Census data	20-24	25-29	30-34	35-39	40-44	45-49	50-54	55-59	60-64
Share of people in employment	42.50%	73.47%	76.68%	77.11%	77.8%	78.33%	73.45%	70.11%	49.97%

The average resident of Penha de França spent 25.16 minutes of daily commuting, 3 minutes longer than the average inhabitant of Lisbon.

=== Socioeconomic conditions ===
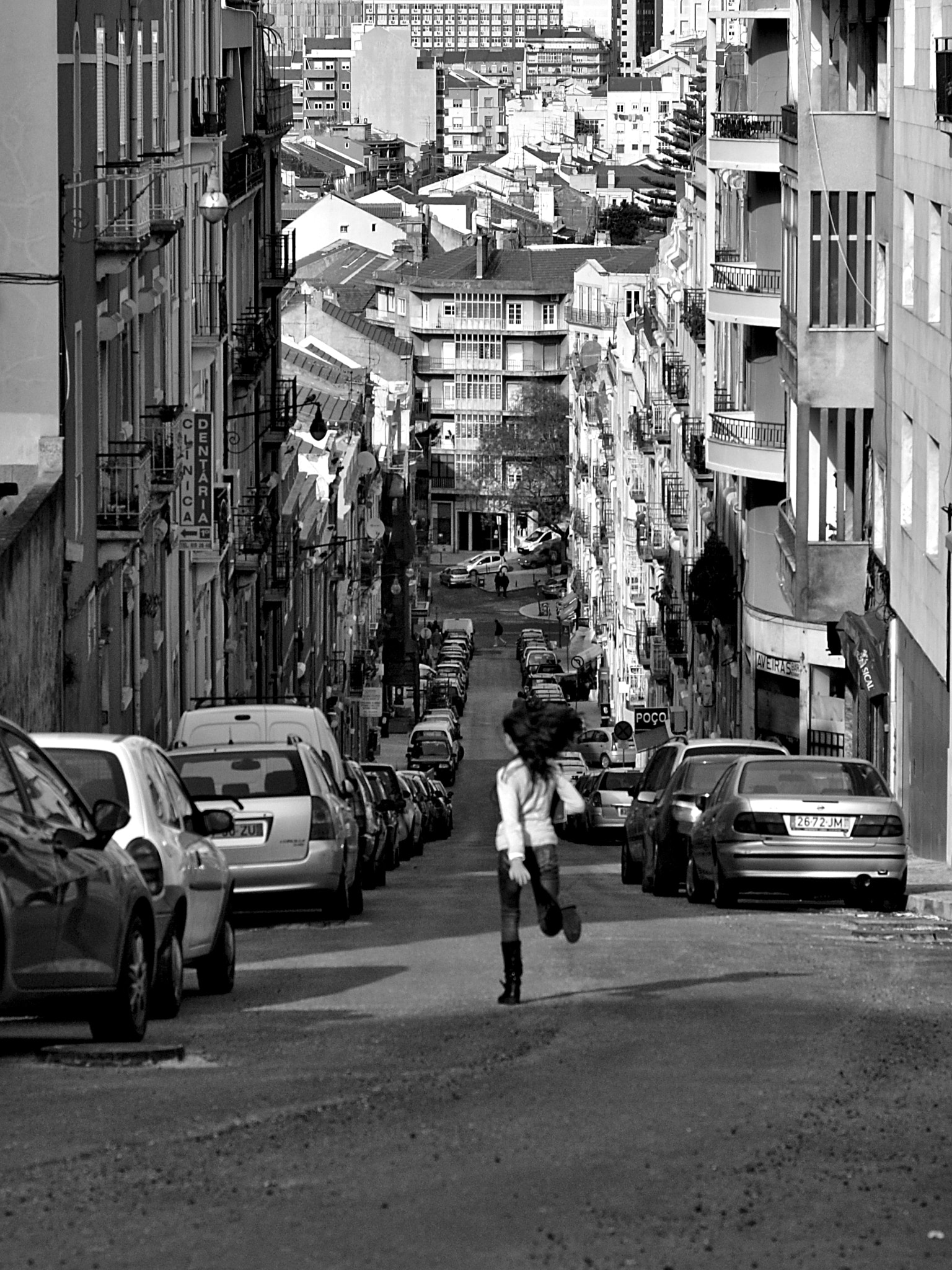
Street view of Penha de França hilly conformation

Overcrowding is an issue in the parish's households. The majority of the population in the parish rents their housing. The average monthly rent value of leased dwellings is 6.01% lower in Penha de França than in Lisbon because of many contracts are rent-controlled, with 20.02% of the renters (mostly the elderly) paying less than €150/month. Due to the housing crisis and inflation, in 2023 the average rent for new contracts stood at almost almost €1,000/month.

Statistic (2021 census)	Penha de França	Lisbon	Portugal
Dwellings per square kilometer	6535	3200	65
Average area of dwellings (m^{2})	75.12	93.07	112.45
Living space of less than 15m^{2} per capita	12.74%	8.71%	5.65%
Owned dwellings	43.3%	50.3%	70%
Average monthly rent of leased dwellings	€442.56	€470.87	
Median price for houses sold	€2849/m^{2}	€4080/m^{2}	

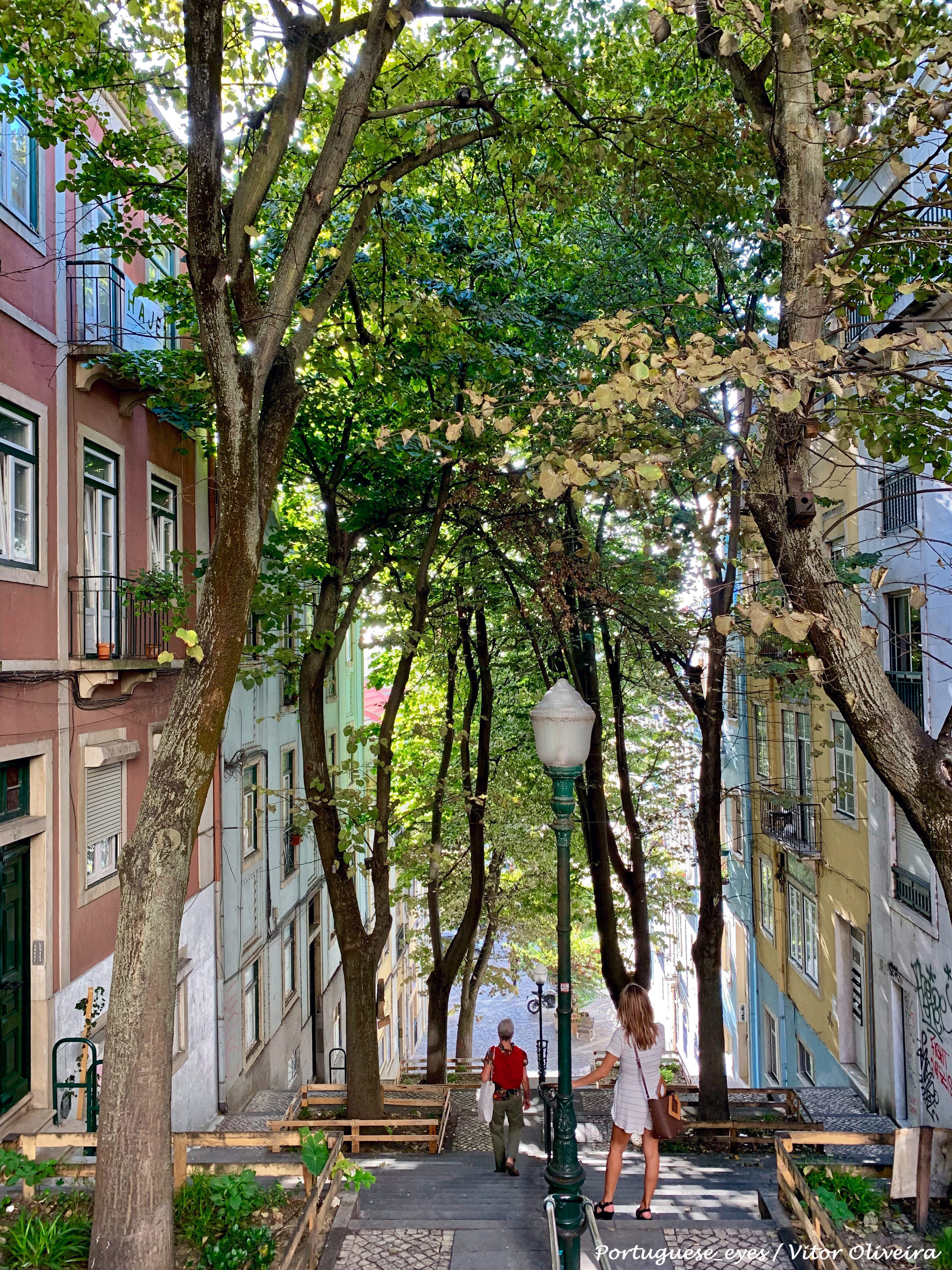
Street view, 2020

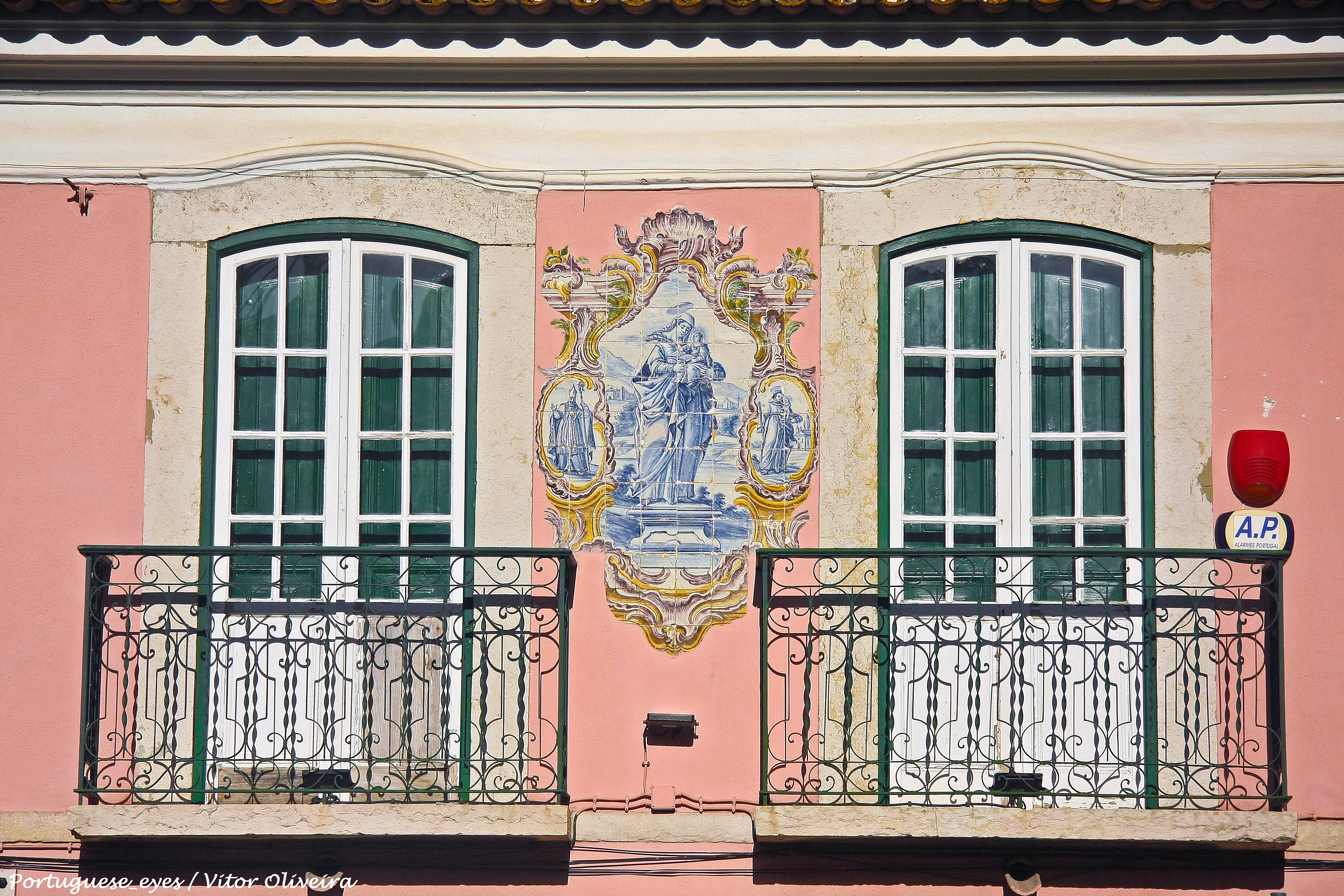
Junta de Freguesia de Penha de França

The 2021 census recorded 21 homeless people in the parish, of which 17 were male. The parish is actively promoting initiatives to helping people in homelessness, such as the Associação para a Saúde e Desenvolvimento Solidário and the Mercearia Social da Penha de França, established in 2017. The Albergue Xabregas, created in 1999, serves around 500 people annually; it provides a supervised injection site (sala de chuto, lit. shooting room) to help drug addicts recover from their addiction.

== Landmarks ==
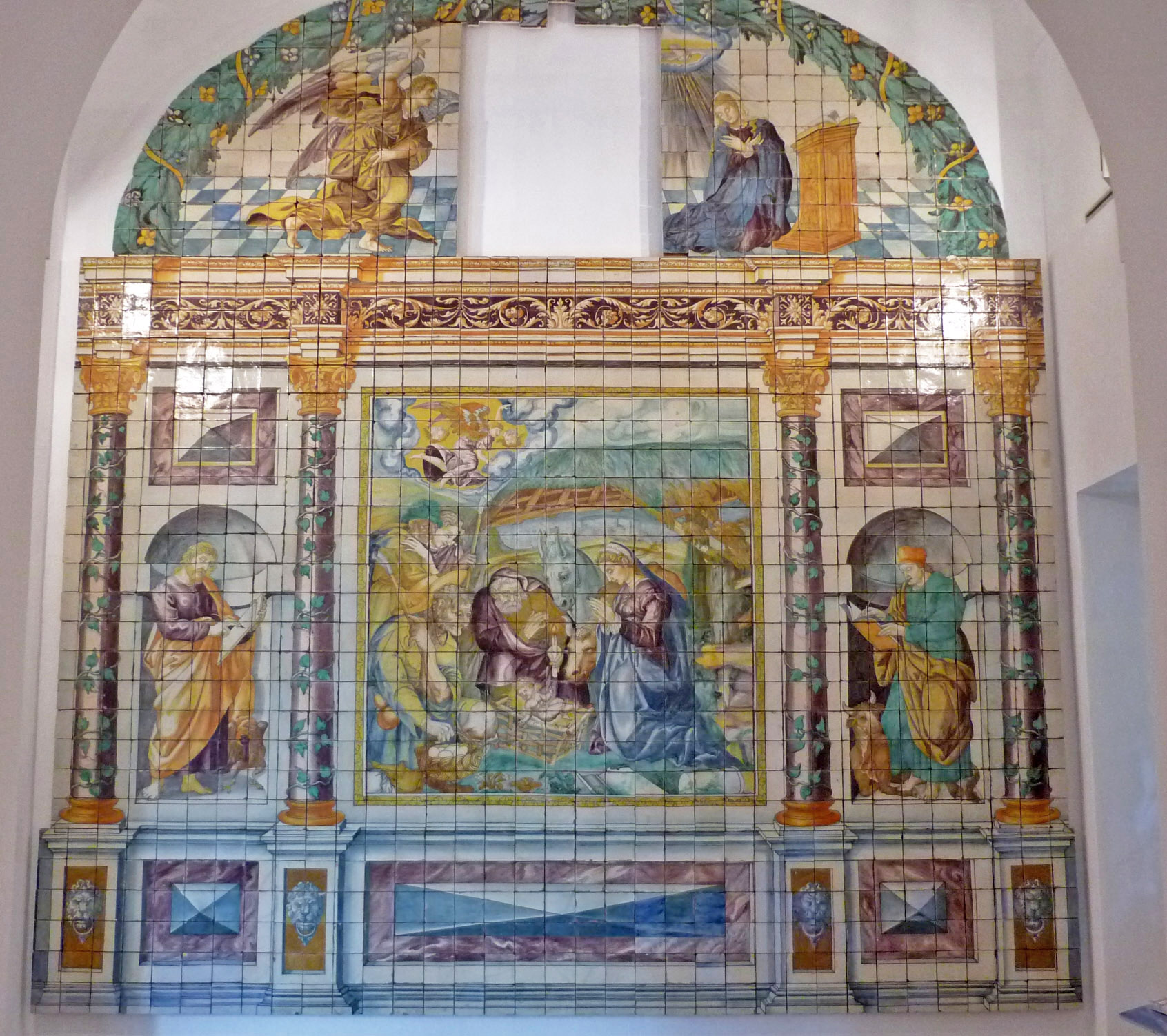
Nossa Senhora da Vida retabule; 16th century

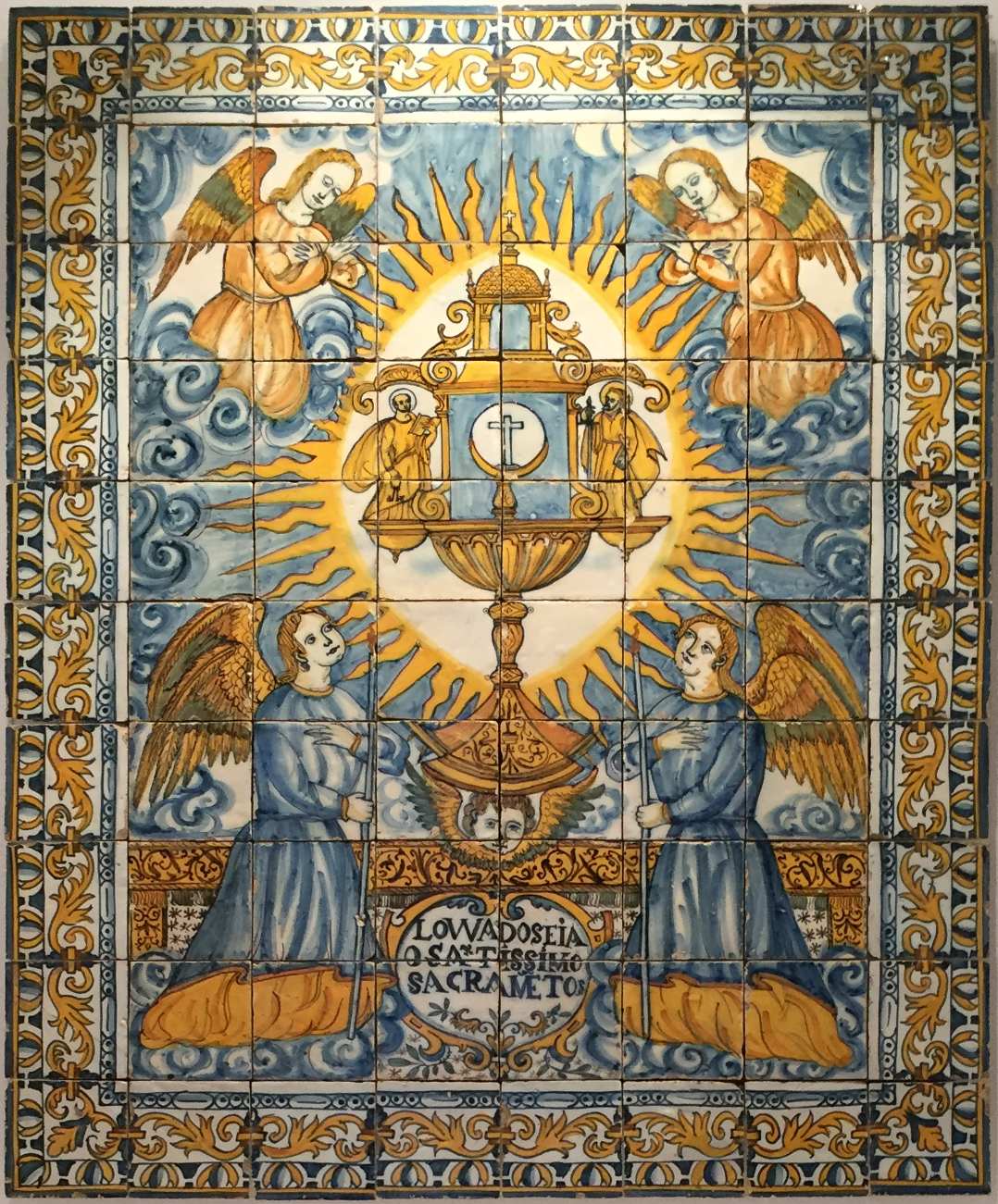
Tiles dating from 1660

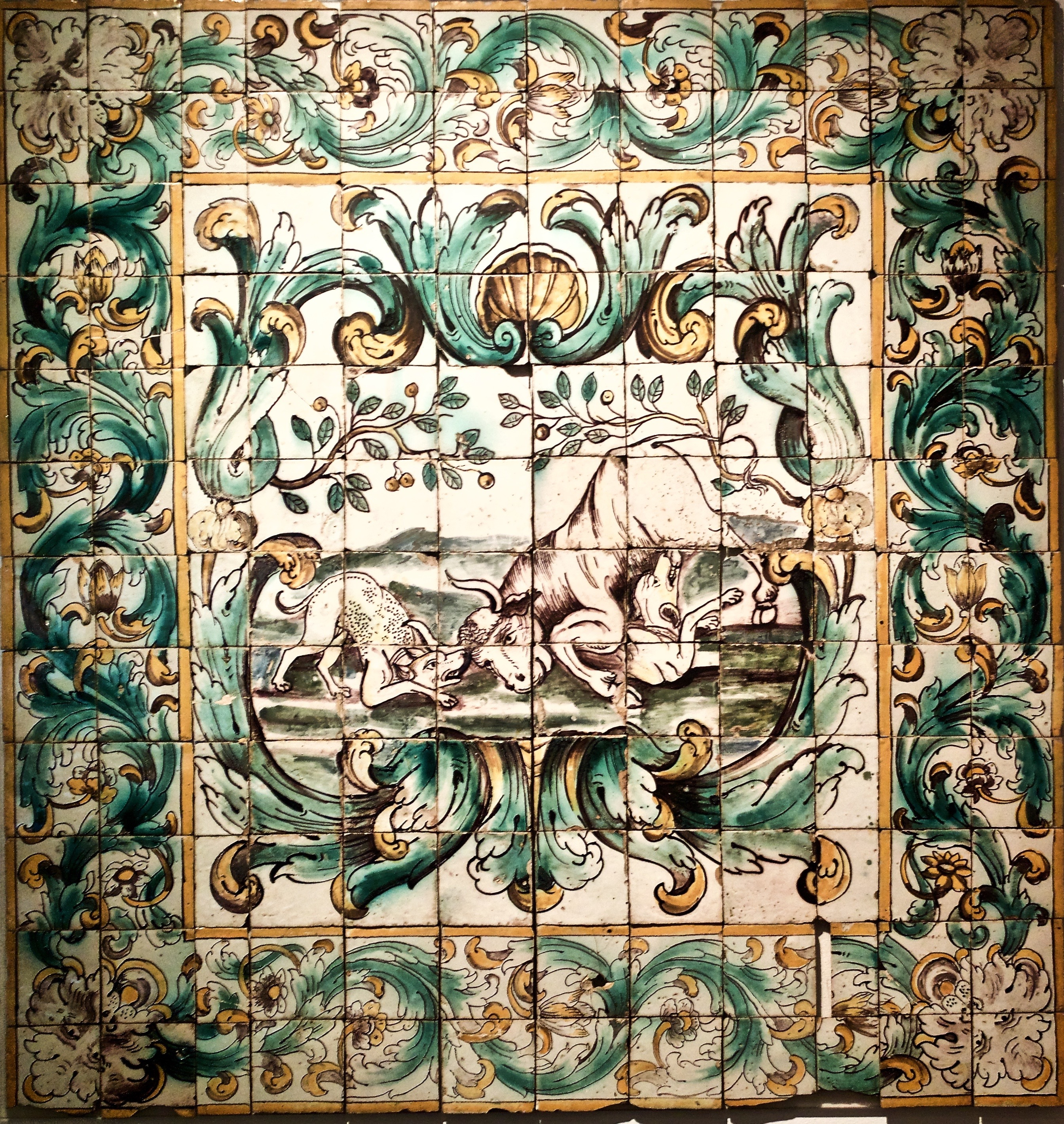
Tiles from 1680

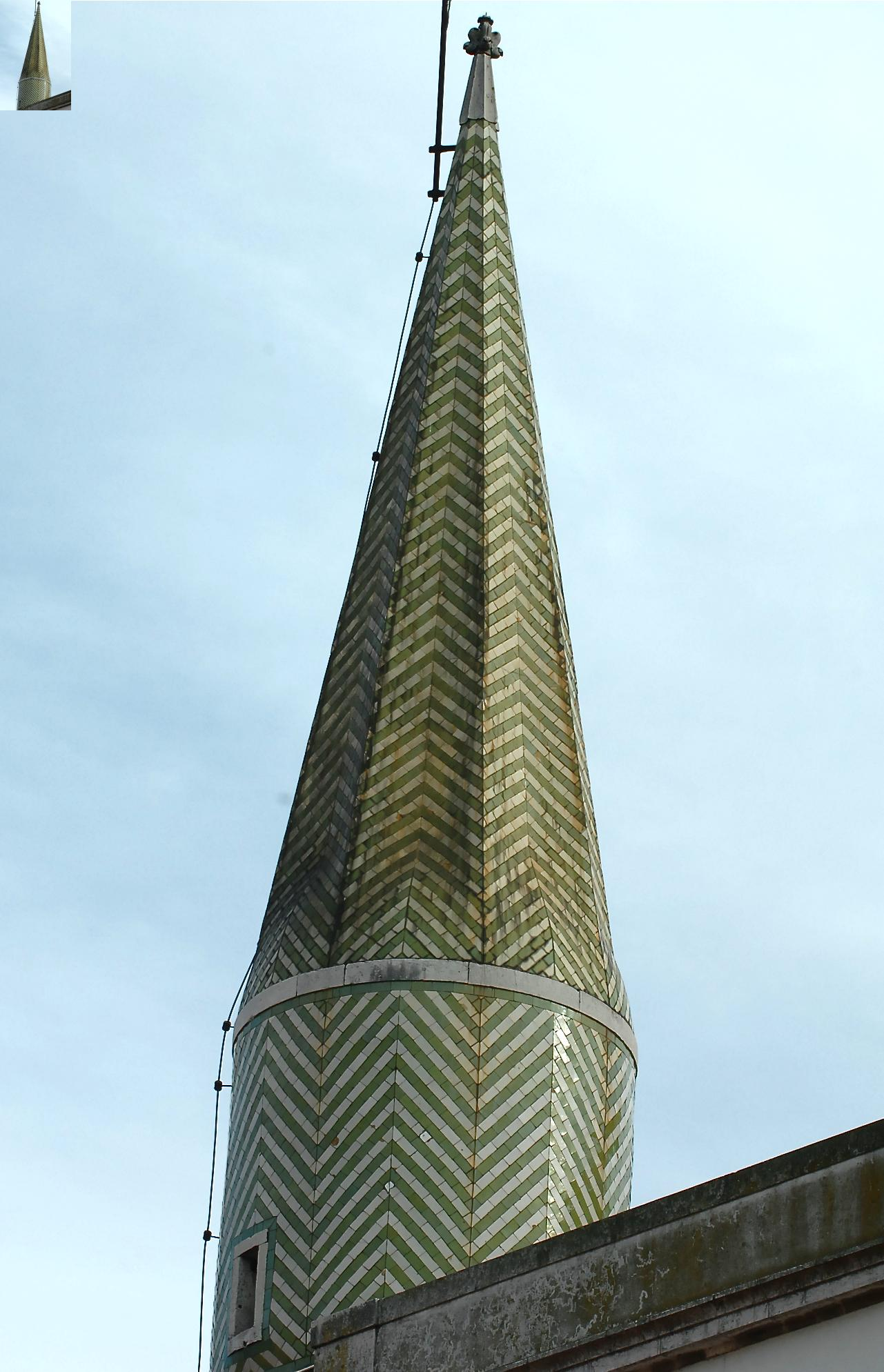
Tiles Tower, Madre de Deus

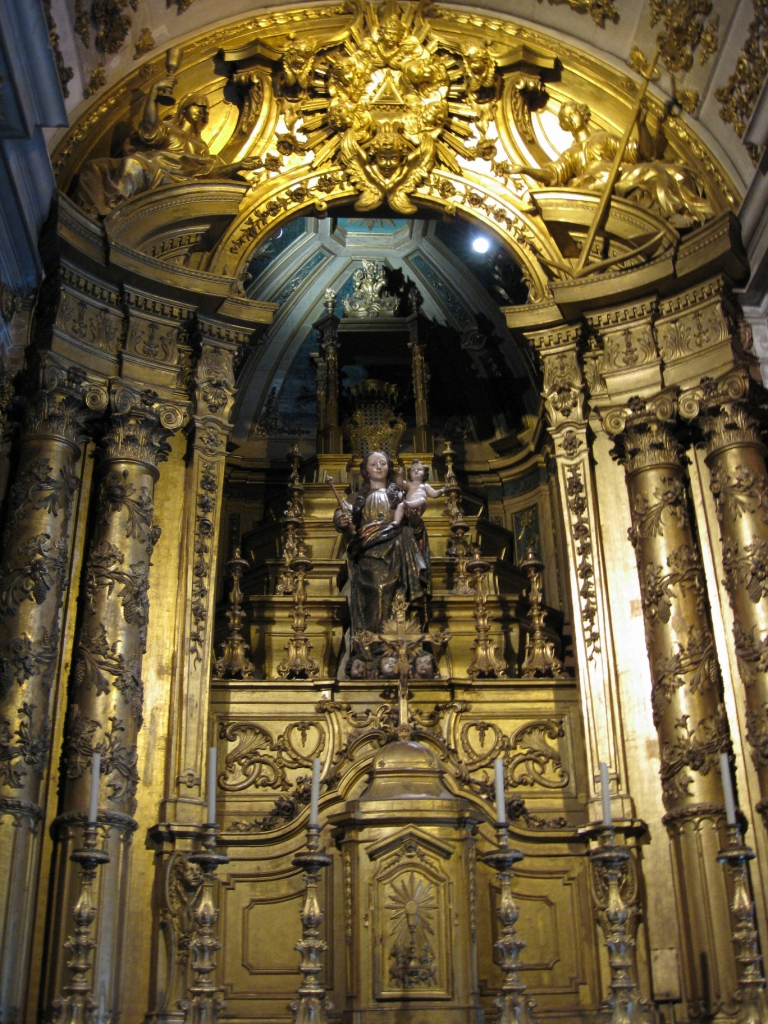
Baroque altar

- Alto de São João Cemetery: Including the Jazigo Viscondes de Valmor, it was established in 1833 during a cholera epidemic it was located in the rural outskirts and holds a diverse history. Its architecture includes works by renowned architects and anonymous builders. The cemetery pays tribute to Republican revolutionaries, features mausoleums dedicated to benefactors and women activists, and housed Portugal's first crematorium in 1925, later reactivated in 1985. People buried here include Miguel Vaz de Almada and José António do Vale. The cemetery also hosts a church (Igreja do Cemitério do Alto de São João).
- Ancient fountains Chafariz da Avenida Afonso III and Chafariz do Alto do Pina, and the 1870 fountain Chafariz da Penha de França.
- Edifício na Rua dos Baldaques, 13: Building from 1932 that won the Eugénio dos Santos architecture prize
- Fernando Correia Martins monument: A 2019 memorial monument
- Fort Santa Apolónia or Baluarte de Santa Apolónia: built between 1652 and 1668, defended the eastern part of Lisbon. Its pentagonal design, facing east and west, includes well-preserved features like masonry walls, watchtowers, and gates. Classified as a Property of Public Interest, it was part of a riverside defensive line. In 2021 it was provided with a new system of wooden ladders so as to make the access easier.
- Forte de Santa Apolónia geomonumento: In the Middle Miocene, the area around Lisbon served as an estuary for a major river, where fresh water mingled with the saltwater from the sea. Within this transitional setting, abundant in organic material, substantial populations of Gryphaea gryphoides oysters took root, with some of these oysters growing to impressive lengths of up to 40 cm.
- A number of Catholic churches: Igreja Paroquial de São Francisco de Assis was inaugurated in 1959, Igreja São João Evangelista inaugurated in 1989, and Priorado de São Pio X.
- Jewish Cemitery: In 1868, King D. Luís granted Lisbon's Jews permission to establish the Calçada das Lages Cemetery (now Afonso III), still the main burial site for the Lisbon Jewish Community. In 1892, the Civil Government Charter ratified the statutes of the "Guemilut Hassadim Association," offering aid in times of need and funerals, founded by Moses Anahory. Currently, around 270 people are buried there.
- Madre de Deus Convent and church: Founded in 1509 by Queen D. Leonor, the Convent showcases diverse architectural styles, including Mudéjar, Manueline, Mannerist, Baroque, and Revivalist. It houses the National Tile Museum, displaying a rich collection of tiles from various eras. The church's simple façade features a notable 19th-century Neo-Manueline portal. Inside, the single nave is adorned with 18th-century historical azulejos depicting the life of St. Francis, and the main chapel and choir boast 16th-century paintings framed in gilt woodwork
- Miradouro da Penha de França: An unforgettable view encompasses both the Tagus Valley, where the horizon meets the Atlantic Ocean, and the opposite direction, offering a glimpse of Alto de São João and much of both riverbanks. To the north, the distant presence of the Sintra Mountain Range can be seen
- National Museum of the Azulejo: Housed in the Convent of the Mother of God, this museum showcases Portuguese azulejos from the 15th to the 20th century, including notable pieces like the Altarpiece of Our Lady of Life and modern works
- Nossa Senhora da Penha de França Church and convent: The first chapel with this dedication emerged following a vow made by the visionary António Simões after the Battle of Alcácer Quibir. Construction began in 1597–98. In 1601, it was handed over to the Augustinian hermits. Between 1625 and 1635, a new temple was built to replace the previous one. It underwent several renovations, notably in the 18th century. It houses many notable azulejos. In the late XX century was created a chapel (Capela de São João Baptista) located in Avenida Eduardo Galhardo, to better serve the parishioners during the weekends.
- Painel de azulejos na fachada da Escola António Arroio: A 1999 polychrome tile panel, 1180 cm × 900 cm, by Master Querubim Lapa, graces the exterior façade of António Arroio School. It features a deconstructed, abstract design with vibrant contrasts
- Palace Diogo Cão (Palácio Diogo Cão): Currently housing the Junta de Freguesia. It is a house dating from the XVIII century, whose origins lie in the XV century but that was later restored after the 1755 earthquake.
- Palace of the Marquises of Nisa: Founded in 1543 by D. Francisco da Câmara, the second Count of Vidigueira, this building passed through various owners, including descendants of Vasco da Gama in 1634. It returned to the possession of the Marquises of Nisa in 1672 and underwent significant improvements at that time. Altered substantially from its original structure, both by the earthquake and the interventions of successive owners, it was sold to the Misericórdia de Lisboa in 1926
- Santos-o-Novo convent: Built in the early 17th century for the Order of Santiago, this imposing structure survived partial destruction in the 1755 earthquake. It includes a vast cloister, ornate chapels, and gilded woodwork

== Culture ==
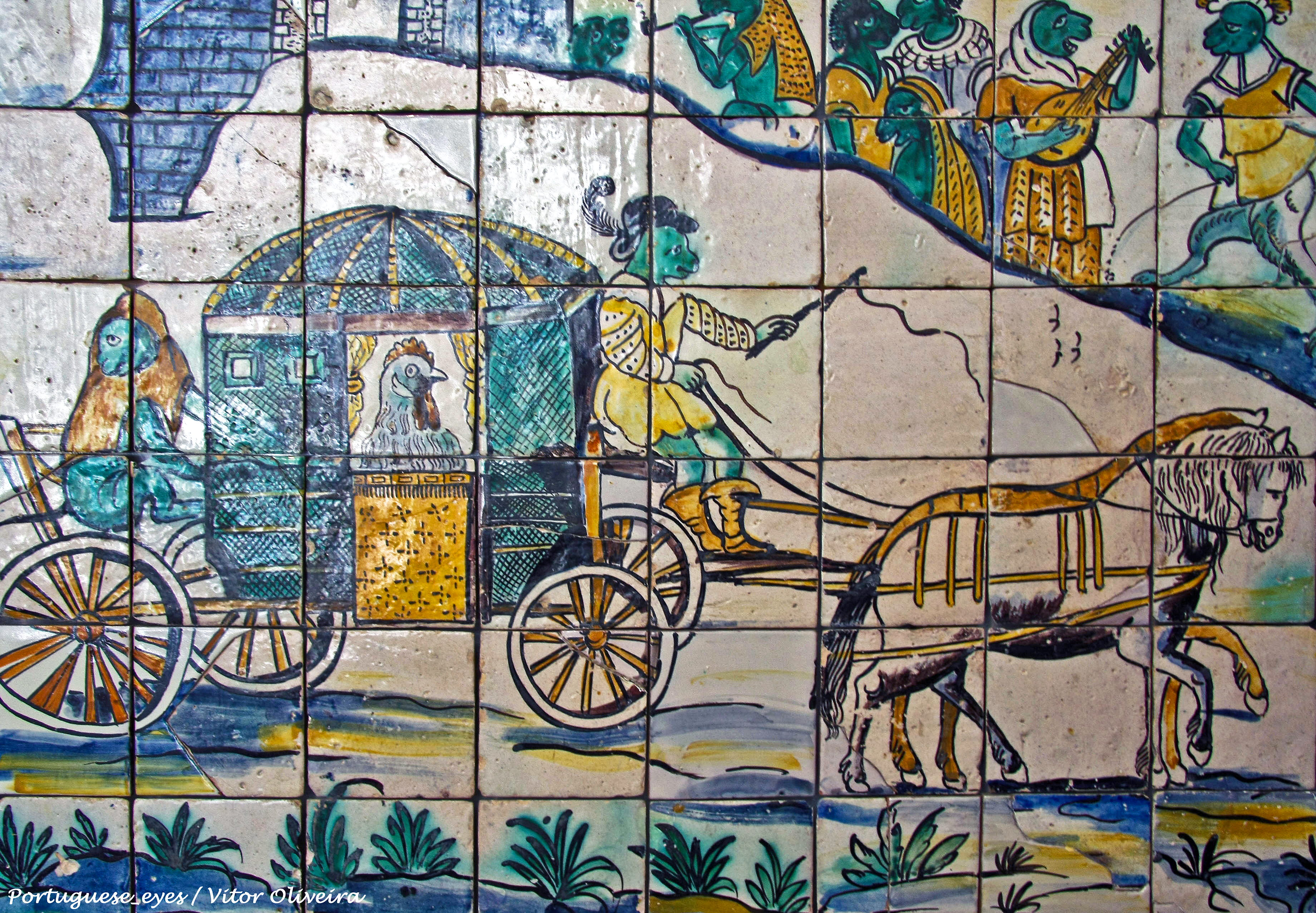
Macacaria style tiles, Museu Nacional do Azulejo

The parish hosts many cultural events and cultural initiatives throughout the year. For instance, it created its own superhero "Super Penhas" to encourage participation from kids. An annual event held by the parish is the gastronomic competition "Penha à mesa", which lasts around 10 days in July. The parish hosts the Penha de França Theme Fair on a bimonthly basis. The parish organises periodical workshops or cultural events, most notably in the main library. There are also often partnerships with local cultural institutions and museums.

Penha de França is also very active during Marchas Populares, an event celebrating Portuguese Midsummer. During this event, teams dress up in handmade outfits and march and dance in an open avenue or closed arena to the sound of popular music, mixing motifs of Portuguese summer culture, like "manjerico" and the sea. Penha de França participates with two teams, the "Penha de França" and the "Alto da Pina".

One tradition in Penha de França is the "Procissão do Ferrolho" (lit. Bolt Procession), a nighttime event where doors are knocked with a ferrolho (latch) to awaken the devout.

The parish also features three public libraries. There are many cultural associations such as the Portuguese Camping and Mountaineering Federation, "Os fidalgos da Penha", Penha SCO (established in 2019), and "A goela" (established in 2015). Also within the parish are a large municipal market, Ginásio do Alto do Pina (established in 1911); and art galleries.

== Sport ==
The parish has organised many initiatives to promote a healthy lifestyle among the residents.

There are several sports facilities, including:

- Espaço Multiuso: a parish-owned space offering multiple sports courses along the year
- Piscina da Penha de França: a swimming pool built in 1960, 12 m wide and 25 m long. It was closed in 2011 for renovations and reopened in 2021, after an €800,000 investment.

== Health ==
Residents of Penha de França can access medical treatment at the parish's Medical Center. Eight pharmacies (2.8 per 10,000 residents) and a SNS counter are also located in Penha de França.

A new hospital, "Unidade de saúde de Sapadores-Graça", was expected to open in 2024.

== Gardens and parks ==
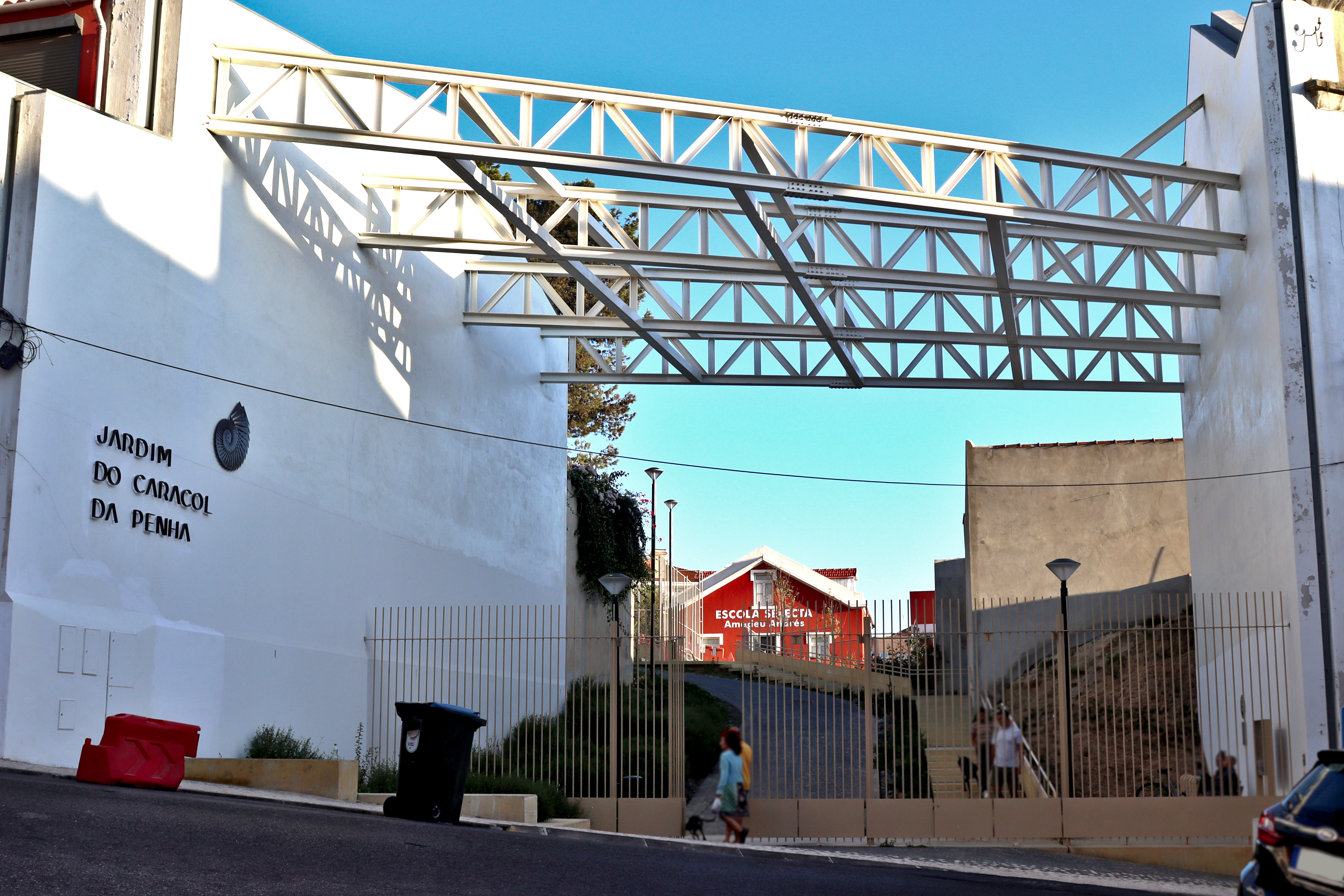
Jardim do Caracol da Penha entrance

The parish hosts several green spaces, including:

- Jardim da Praça Paiva Couceiro: 1950s-era garden with a playground, public restroom, and esplanade, approximately 5000 m^{2}.
- Jardim da Praça António Sardinha: garden with a playground, approximately 2000 m^{2}
- Jardim Bulhão Pato: garden with a playground, approximately 1500 m^{2}
- Jardim do Caracol da Penha: garden with an amphitheatre, viewpoint, sports park, and playground. It contains over 25,000 species of small plants and 250 trees.

Nine streets have garden benches and recreational areas.

== Transportation ==
The parish is served by a network of public transportation means, including tramways, buses, and trains.

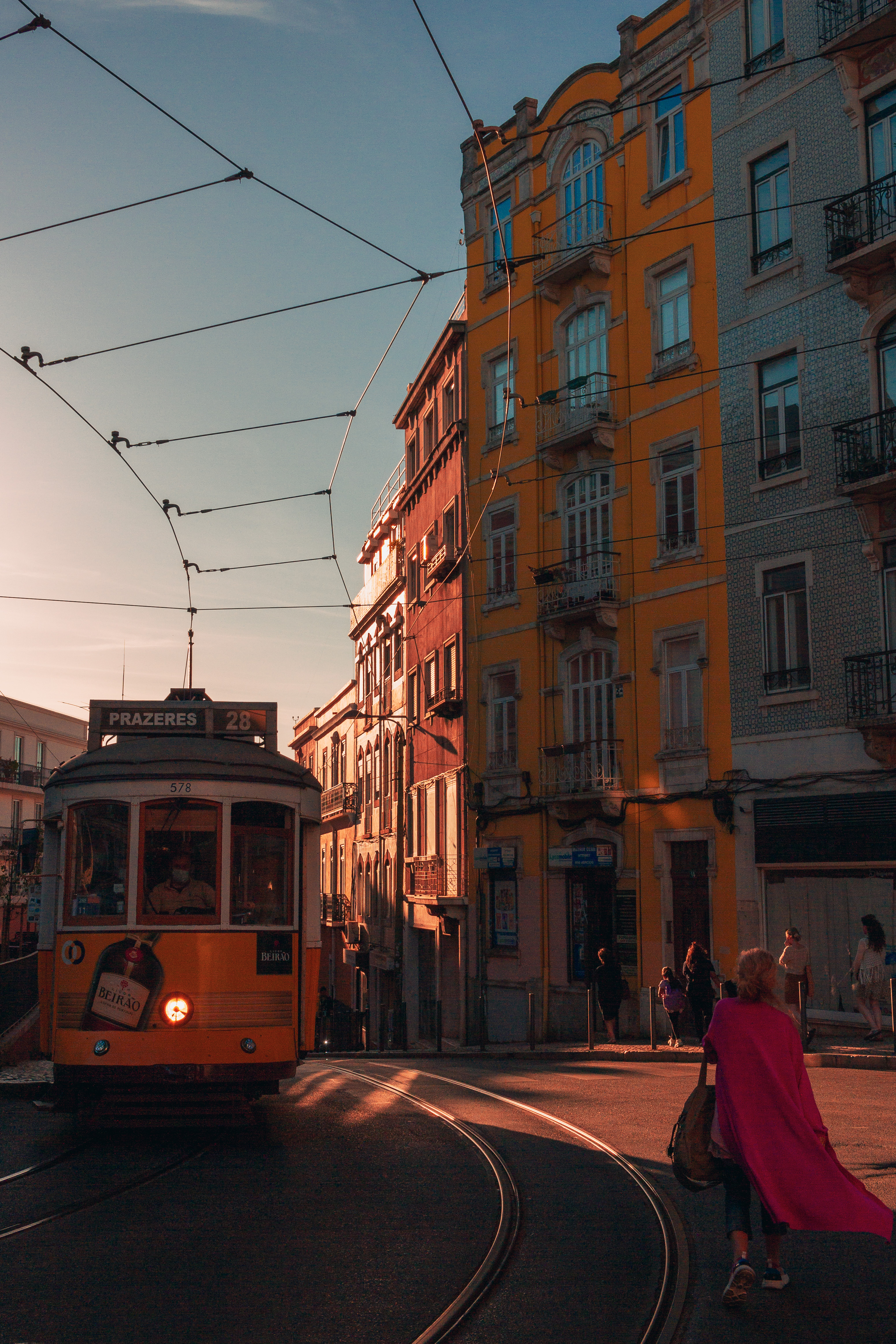
Tramway in Penha de França

Penha de França is among the parishes served by tram 28E, which is one of the most renowned tourist attractions in Lisbon. Two of its 35 stops are located in the parish: Rua Angelina Vidal and Sapadores. As of 2023, there were plans for a new line connecting Santa Apolónia to Amadora, passing through Penha the França and serving the parish with 4 stops. However, there are no definite plans nor dates for the start of the construction.

The bus network in Penha de França is quite extensive, encompassing most of the parish's streets.

Despite there being a train line that passes through the parish, there are no stops in Penha de França. The train line divides the riverbanks (where part of the port of Lisbon is located) from the rest of the parish, so there are only two ways to access the riverfront:

- Rua Bispo de Cochim Dom Joseph Kureethara: This street passes under the Xabregas viaduct and serves as a boundary between Penha de França and Beato. The name honours an Indian bishop who died in 1999.
- Viaduct of Av. Mouzinho de Albuquerque: The street passes over the railway due to a bridge built in the late 1990s. It serves as a boundary between Penha de França and São Vicente. The name honours a Portuguese general who died in 1902.

== Notable people ==
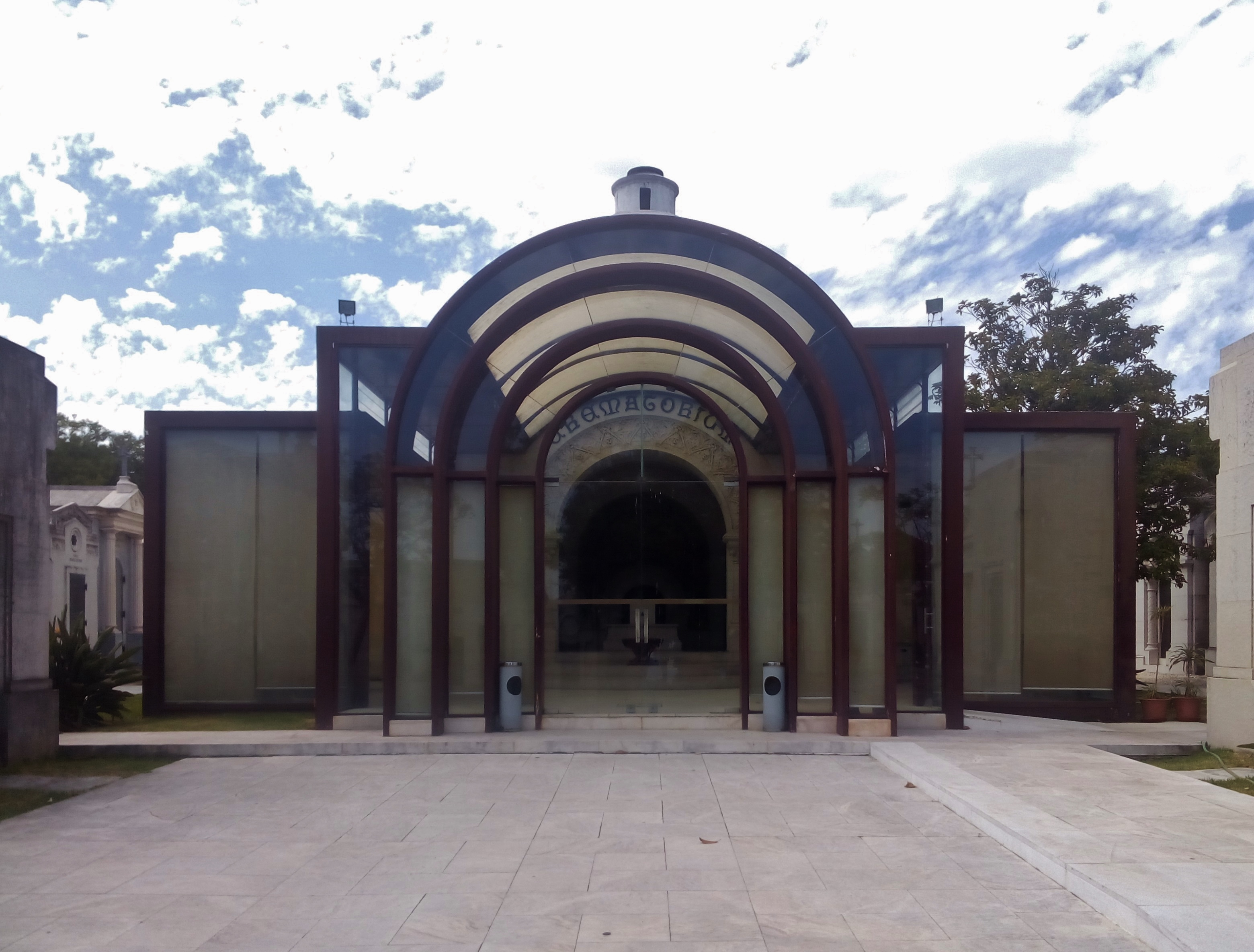
Crematorium Alto de São João, the first in Portugal

People who were born, lived, or buried within Penha de França include:

- Jerónimo de Vilhena e Brito (1713-1786): Portuguese-Spanish nobleman
- António Botelho (1749-1799): Portuguese-Spanish nobleman
- Jerónimo de Vilhena e Mendonça (1776-1814): Portuguese-Spanish nobleman
- António Novais Pimentel (1780-1852): Portuguese-Spanish nobleman
- António Luís Pereira Coutinho (1818-1908): Portuguese nobleman
- Ana Augusta de Castilho (1860-1916): Portuguese feminist, teacher, propagandist, freemason, and republican activist opposed to the Portuguese monarchy
- Jesuína Saraiva (1865-1947): Portuguese actress
- Raul Lino (1879-1974): Portuguese architect
- João Rui de Sousa (1928-2022): Portuguese poet and writer
- Maria Zulmira Zeiger (Anna Paula): Portuguese actress and playwright
- Graça Lobo (1938): Portuguese actress
- Humberto Fernandes (1940-2009): Portuguese footballer
- Hélio Cunha (1948): Portuguese artist
- Filomena Gonçalves (1961): Portuguese actress
- José Raposo (1963): Portuguese actor
- Nininho Vaz Maia (1988): Portuguese singer, considered one of the main voices linked to the flamenco musical style in Portugal
