= Fort Santa Apolónia =

- Forte de Santa Apolónia
- Lisbon, Portugal
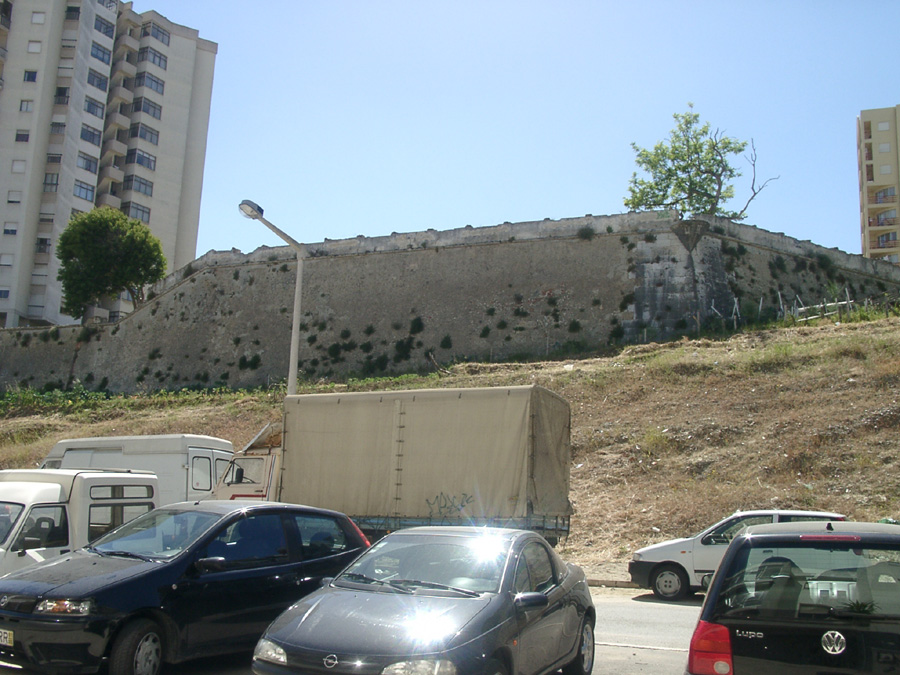
- River-facing walls of the fort.

Site information
- Type: Bastion fort
- Open to the public: Yes.
- Condition: Ruined.

Location
- Location within Portugal
- Coordinates: 38°43′25″N 9°7′1″W

Site history
- Built: 1652 and 1668

The Fort Santa Apolónia (Forte de Santa Apolónia), also known as Santa Apolónia Bulwark (Baluarte de Santa Apolónia in Portuguese) or Battery of Manique (Bateria do Manique), is located in the parish of Penha de França, municipality and District of Lisbon, in Portugal.

== History ==
The fort was built between 1652 and 1668, during the Portuguese Restoration War against Spain, but never finished. It was part of a planned ring of small forts or "bulwarks" (baluartes in Portuguese) around Lisbon, of which only four were built: Santa Apolónia, Sacramento, Livramento and Cruz da Pedra Fort.

Built on grounds belonging to the Viscount of Manique, at an undetermined time, the loss of its defensive function meant that the old fort was annexed into the grounds of Manique Estate, (who had two 17th-century stonework gates built) and, later, to the counts of São Vicente.

In 1945, the remains of Santa Apolónia were owned by the firm George & H. Hall Limited.

The set is classified as a Property of Public Interest by Decree of 6 March 1996. It awaits the implementation of a preservation and restoration project commissioned by the Lisbon city council, to the Associação dos Amigos dos Castelos, which foresees the recovery of the wall and two guardhouses, the excavation of the land to remove the rubble and a landscaping intervention in order to preserve the fort, transforming it into a park where the privileged landscape over the Tagus can be appreciated. In addition, the project suggested the creation of a playground, a cafeteria, in addition to the use of one of the three basements of the Concorde building, a 12-storey residential building built inside the fort for the installation of an equipment, such as a library.

== Features ==
The fort, in the eastern sector of the city, stands a dominant position over the Tagus River, is currently inscribed in an inhabited area, in an area lacking in green spaces. Originally pentagonal in plan, its flanks are well marked and the wall, which follows the slope of the land, is made of masonry with limestone stone corners and the bases of two guardhouses, also having two 17th-century gates built by the Viscount of Manique, with the left giving access to the viewpoint, and crowning the walls are exterior masonry guards, gun enplacements interspersed with stone pedestals.
