= Beato, Lisbon =

Beato
- Civil parish
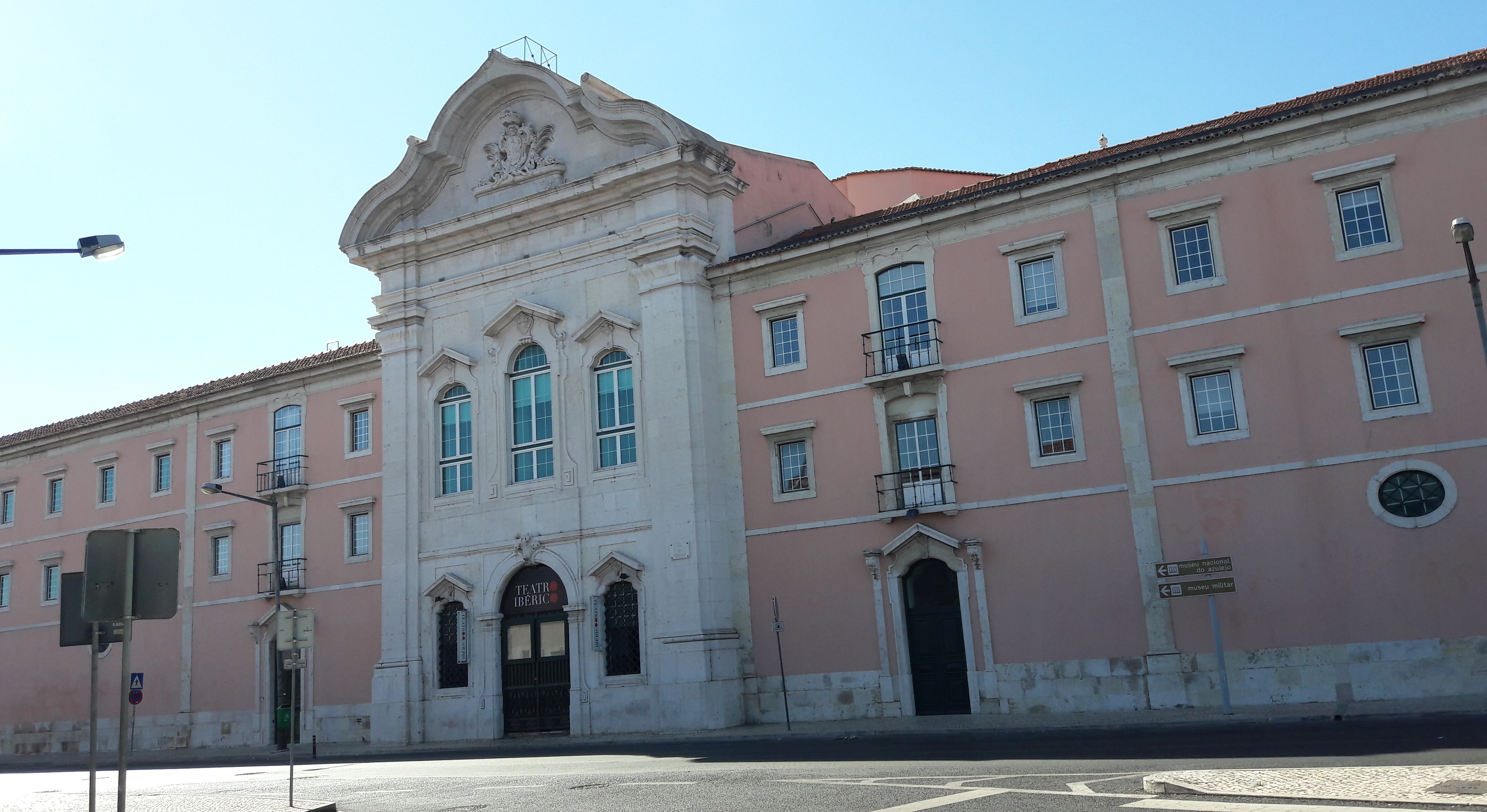
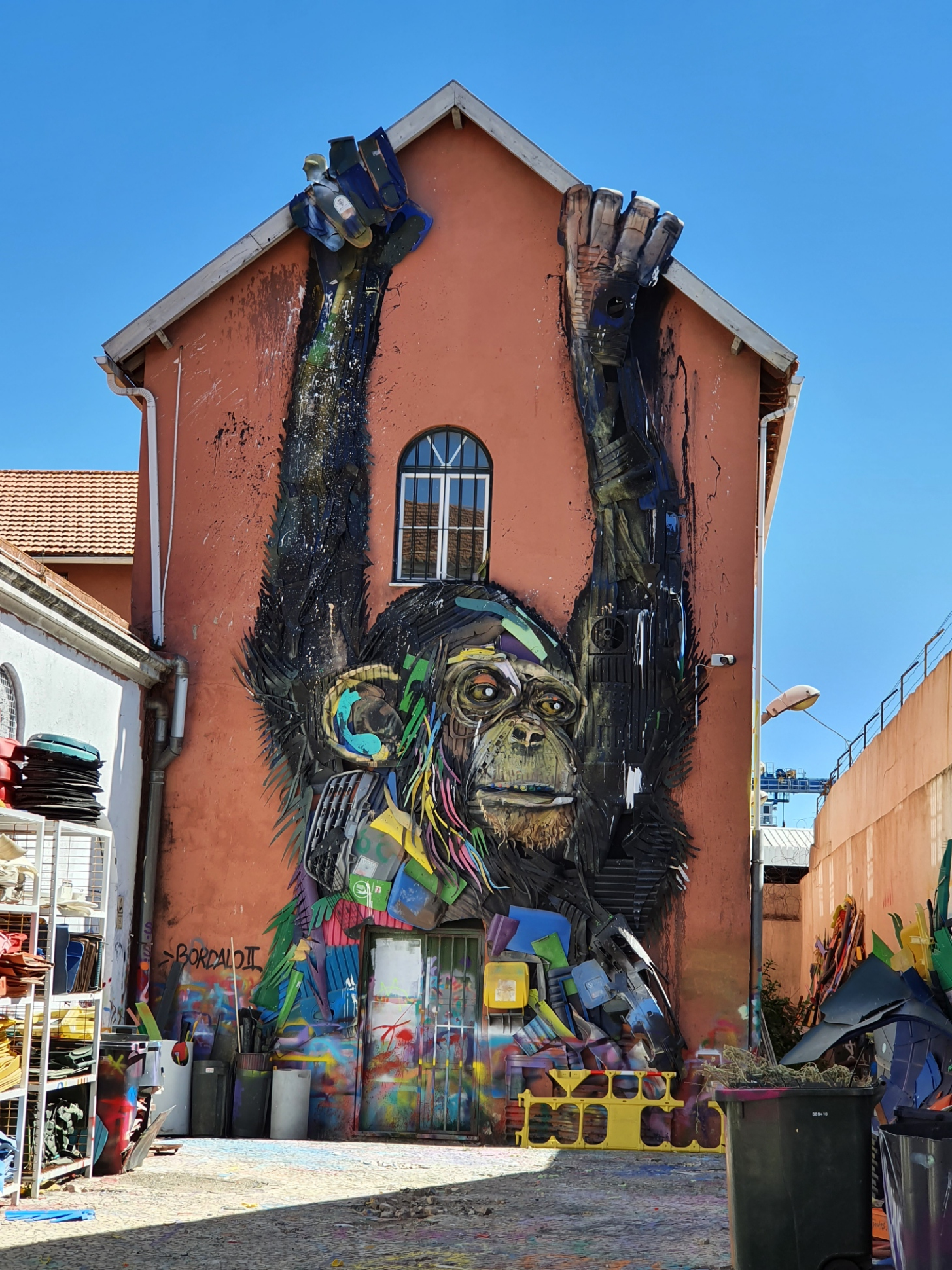
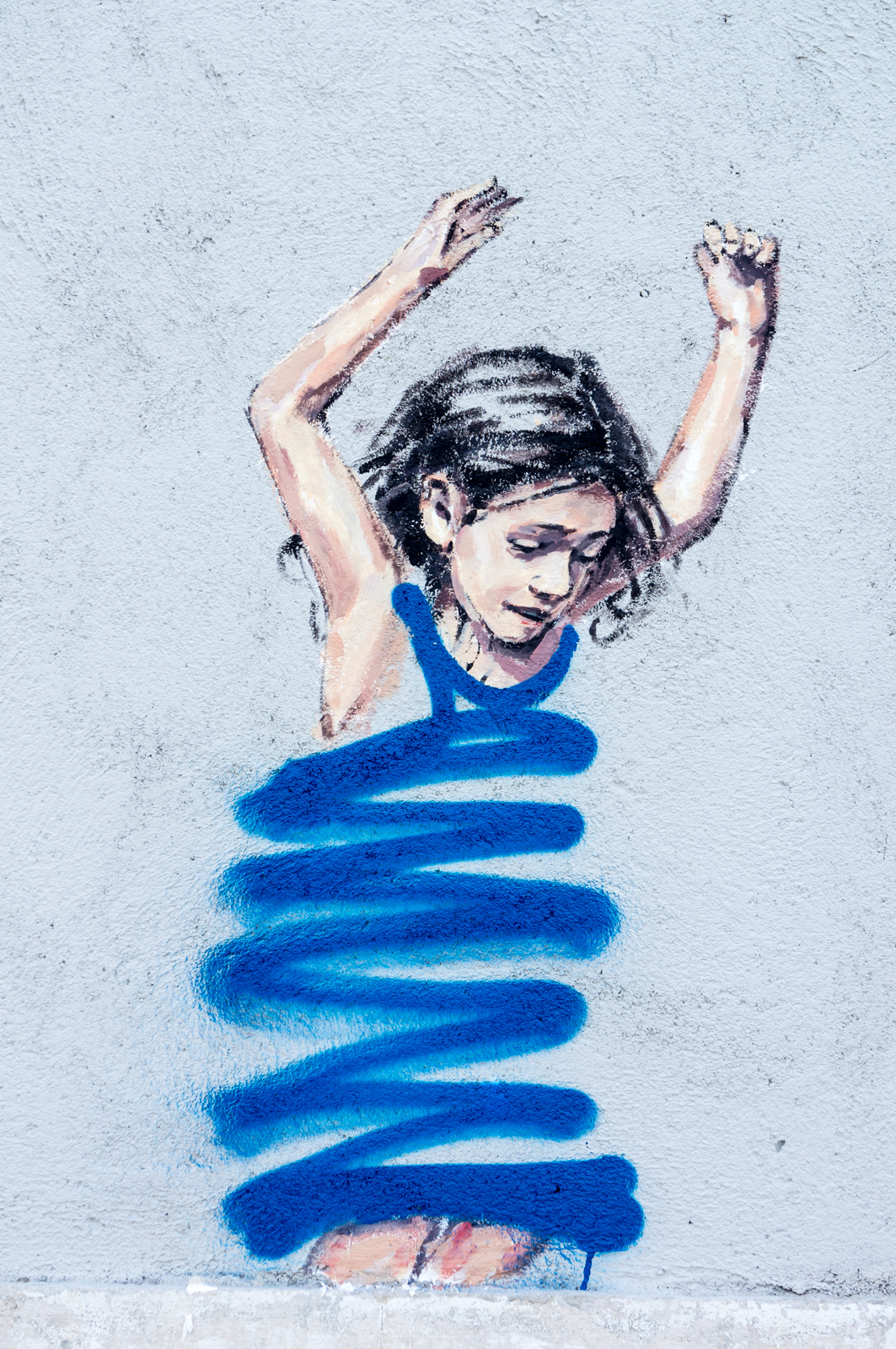
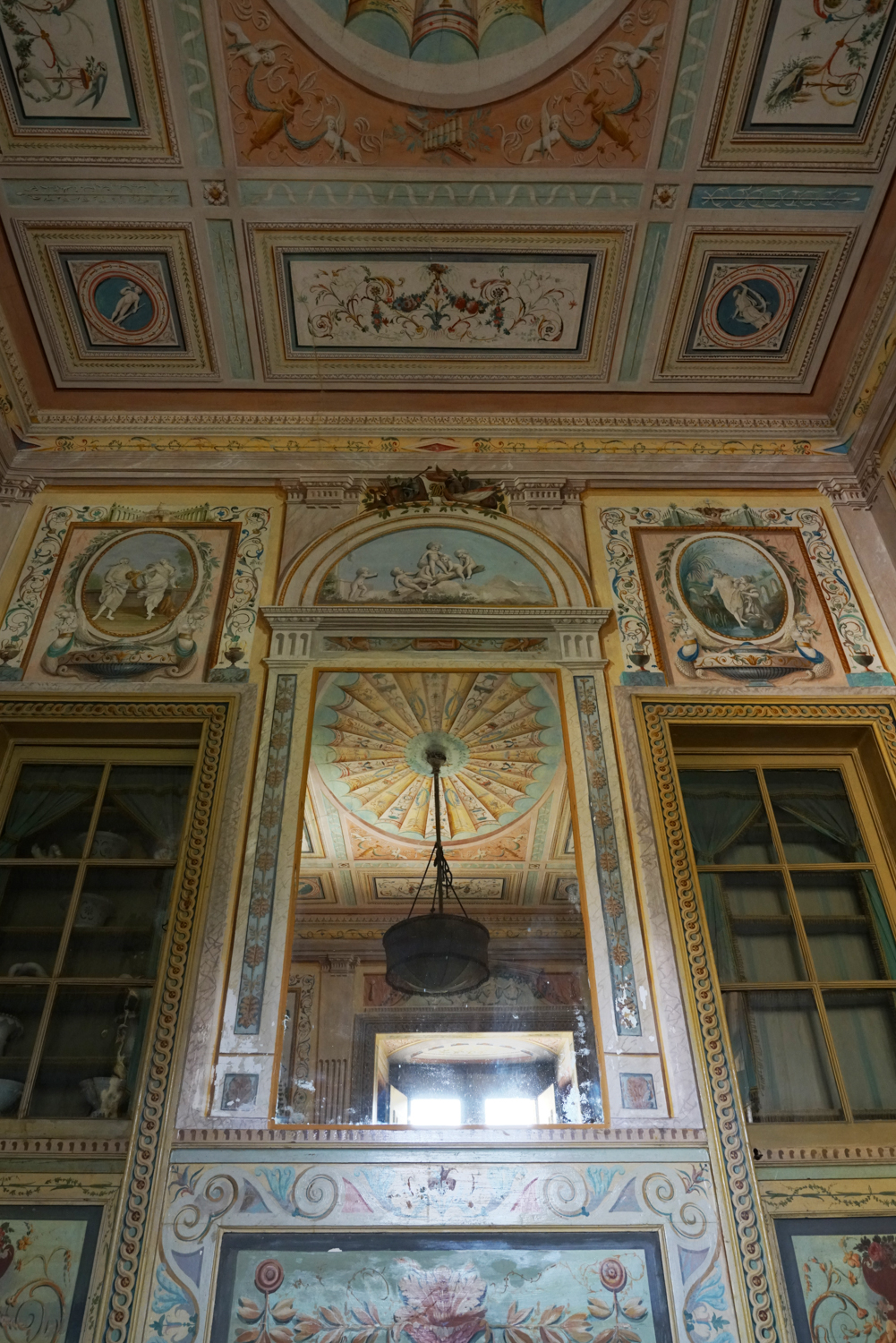
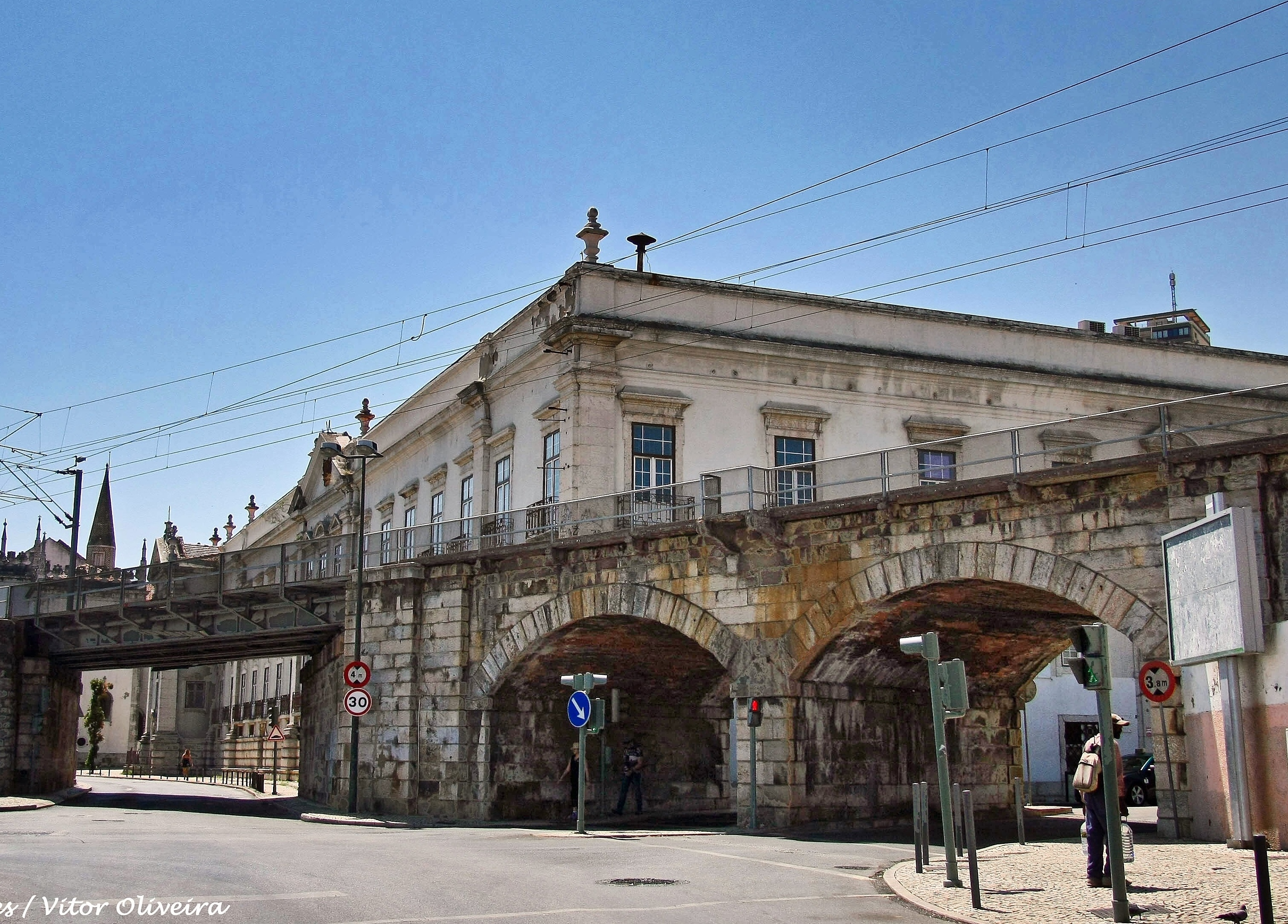
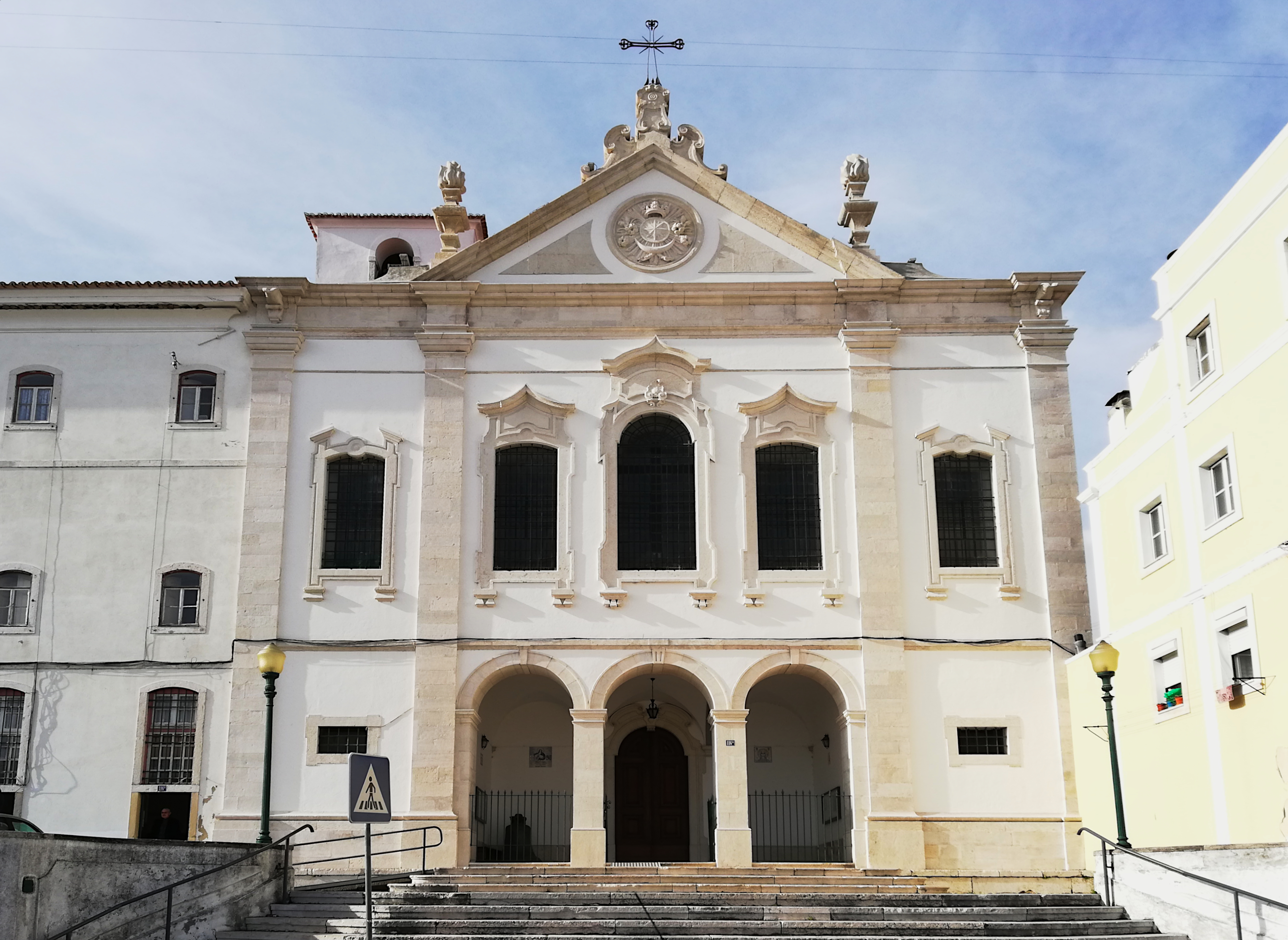
- Clockwise: the Teatro Ibérico; Lafões Palace; Mural; Convento do Grilo; Xabregas Viaduct; Bordalo II sculpture

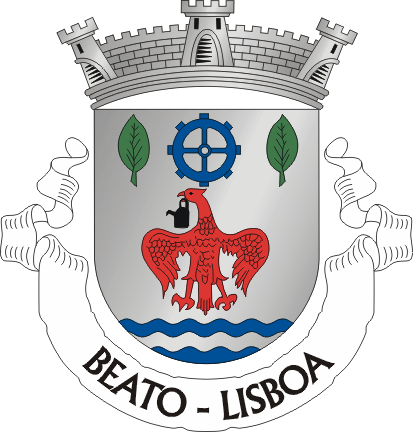
- Coat of arms

- Coordinates: 38.735°N 9.106°W
- Country: Portugal
- Region: Lisbon
- Metropolitan area: Lisbon
- District: Lisbon
- Municipality: Lisbon

Area
  - Total: 2.46 km^{2} (0.95 sq mi)

Population (2021)
  - Total: 12,183
  - Density: 4,950/km^{2} (12,800/sq mi)
- Time zone: UTC+00:00 (WET)
  - Summer (DST): UTC+01:00 (WEST)
- Website: www.jf-beato.pt

Beato (Portuguese pronunciation: [ˈbjatu]) is a freguesia (civil parish) and typical quarter of Lisbon, the capital city of Portugal. Located in eastern Lisbon, Beato is south of Marvila and Areeiro, and west of Penha de França. The population in 2021 was 12,183.

== History ==
The parish of Beato encompasses various locales stretching from Alameda do Beato to the Encosta da Picheleira (lit. Picheleira slope), traversing Xabregas and the Vale de Chelas (Chelas valley) – areas steeped in history. Notably, Chelas and Xabregas are historically significant areas, although the available information on the Paróquia de S. Bartolomeu (Parish of St. Bartholomew - of Beato), which would later give rise to Beato, is not very abundant, at least until the 18th century.

The origins of Chelas are enveloped in legends, yet the true significance of the term remains uncertain. Although some historians ascribe a Latin etymology (planella chaela, lit. small plain) to it.

Concerning Xabregas, historical toponymy has failed to provide a definitive elucidation. Owing to its proximity to the Tagus River, some associate the name with "Xavega" (from the Arabic "xabaka"), a form of fishing net. Additionally, the name Xabregas might be linked to the existence of a Roman settlement called Axabrica, considering the remnants found in the vicinity.

Following the conquest of Lisbon and its environs in 1147, the king bestowed numerous land grants upon military orders, religious entities, and nobility. In 1149 and 1150, the lands of Marvila, encompassing part of the present Beato district, were gifted to the Bishop and the Chapter of the Lisbon Cathedral.

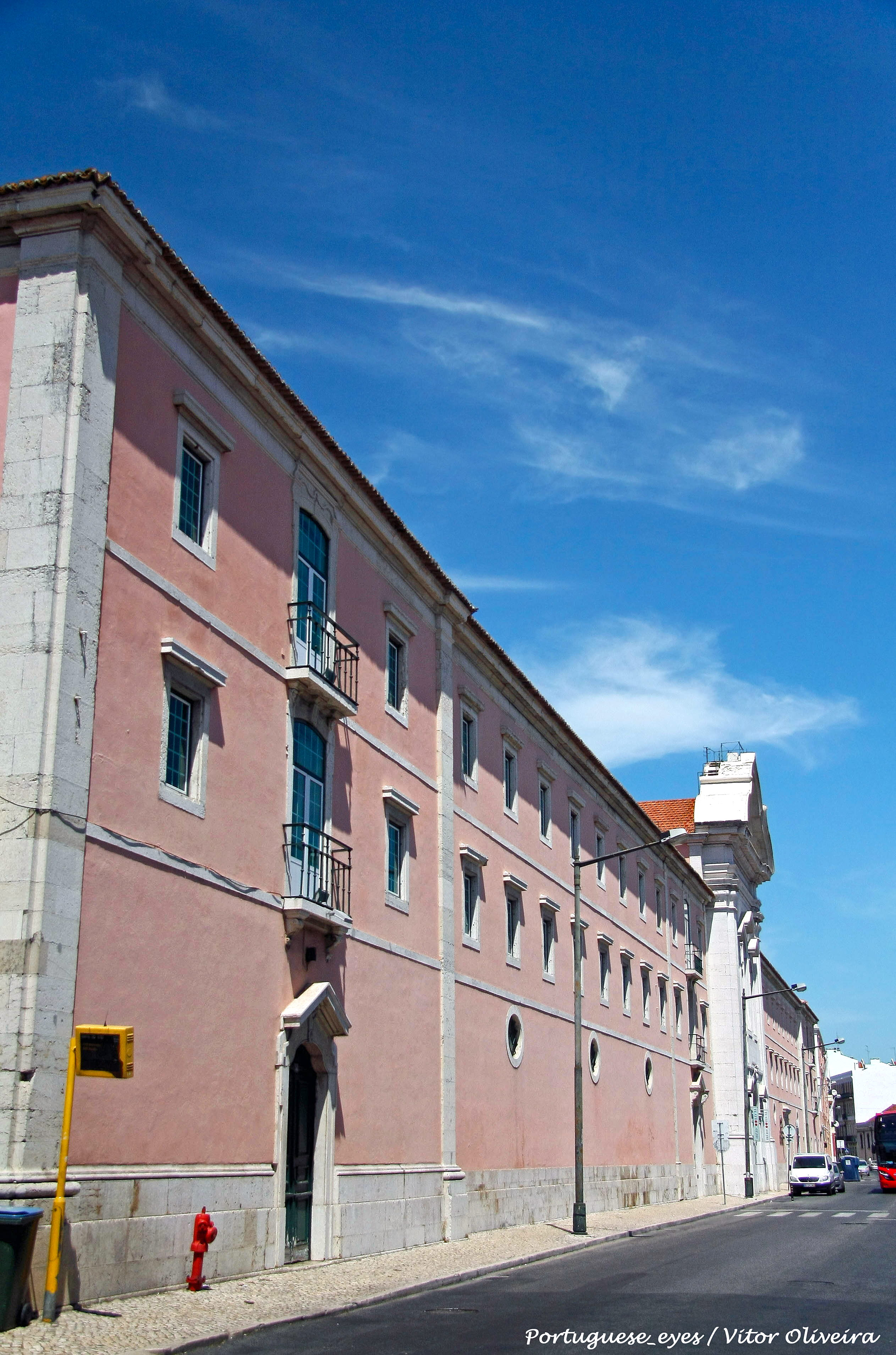
Convento de São Francisco de Xabregas, now hosting Teatro Ibérico. It previously hosted the Royal Palace built in the 13th century.

The region currently constituting the Beato district was characterized by vineyards, olive groves, and almshouses in the early 13th century. The 1220 inquiries disclosed major landholders in the vicinity, including the Order of Santiago (vineyard in Chelas), the Monastery of Santa Cruz de Coimbra (vineyard and olive grove in Concha), and the Templars (vineyards, olive groves, and almshouses in Xabregas and Concha). In the mid-13th century, King Afonso III purportedly commissioned the construction of a palace in Xabregas, the Paço Real de Enxobregas (lit. Royal Palace of Xabregas), presently housing the Convent of Xabregas. It is nowadays transformed into the Institute of Employment and Teatro Ibérico (lit. Iberian theatre). There exist references alluding to a tower and an orange grove, but in 1373, the Xabregas palace succumbed to fire, remaining in ruins until the mid-15th century.

In 1397, the parish of Santa Maria dos Olivais was established, encompassing the entire area of the current Beato.

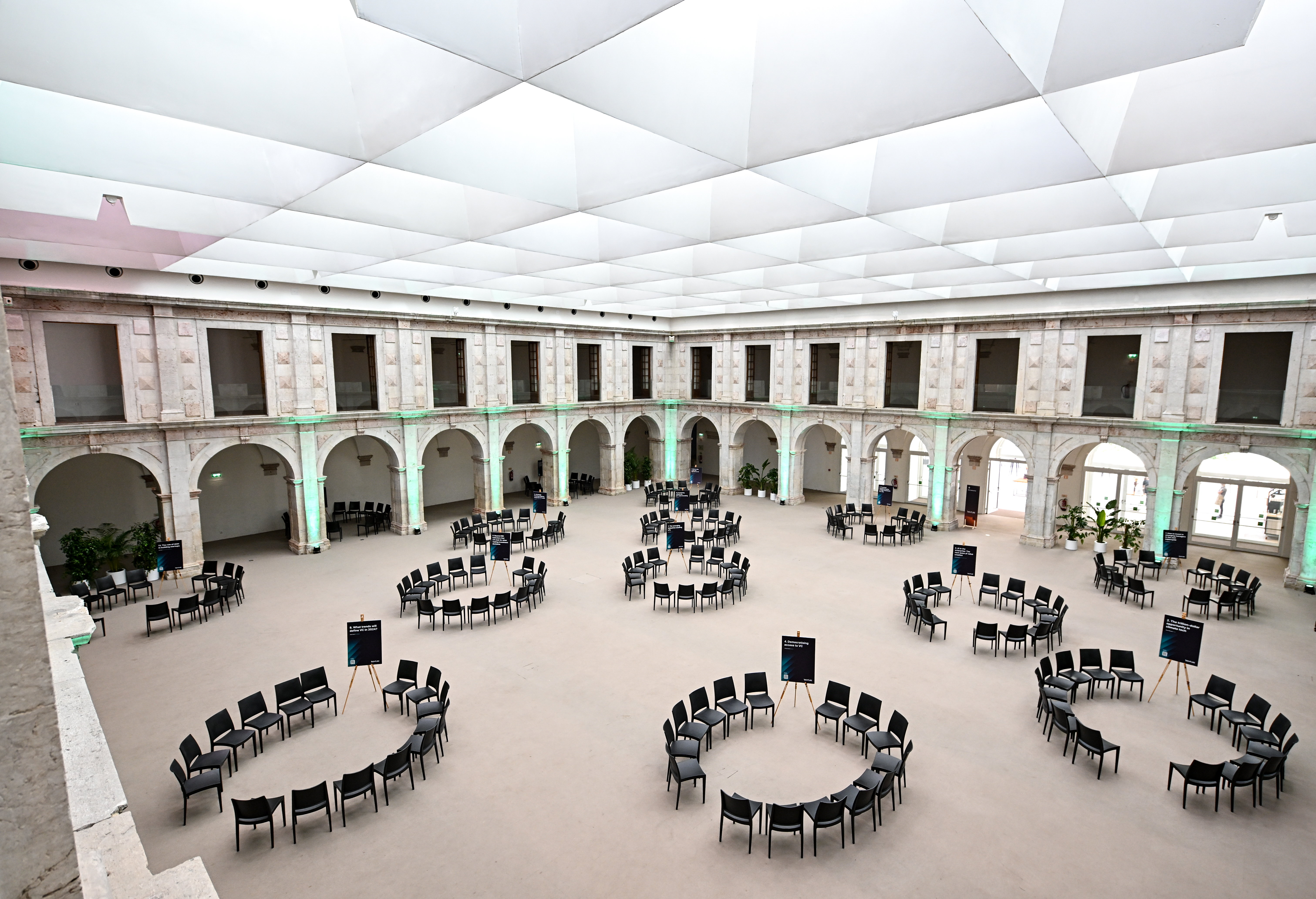
Former convent of Beato. Built in 1455, it is now used for hosting events

In 1455, Queen D. Isabel bequeathed eight thousand gold crowns for the construction of a convent later known as the Convent of St. Benedict of Xabregas (Convent of Beato António), subsequently becoming the primary headquarters of the Order of St. John the Evangelist (Lóios). Around this period, the convent of Santa Maria de Xabregas, situated on the ruins of the Royal Palace, was rebuilt and completed to the west, having been abandoned after the fire 80 years earlier.

In the 16th century, Xabregas was deemed one of the most delightful locales in the Termo de Lisboa (lit. Lisbon Term, area), boasting gardens, orchards, and even a beach. King João III harbored intentions of erecting magníficos paços régios (lit. magnificent royal palaces) in the area, but the endeavor failed to progress beyond its foundations. Xabregas beach hosted jousting tournaments, bullfights, and traditional cane games.

The Parish of Santa Engrácia emerged from a division of the Parish of Santo Estêvão in 1569. The new Parish encompassed the entire Xabregas area and a large part of the area now known as the Beato.

By 1570, Friar António da Conceição, arriving from Évora at the convent of St. Benedict of Xabregas, distinguished himself in aiding the poor and renovating the convent. Upon his demise in 1602, he earned a reputation for holiness, and the populace christened him Beato António, lending his name to the Convent of Beato António, later simplified to Beato, the current designation for the district.

In 1640, Xabregas-Beato emerged as one of the most active centers of conspiracy against Spanish rule. One of the noble conspirators was D. Gastão de Sousa Coutinho, whose palace stood near the thoroughfare still bearing his name, presently the location of Primary School No. 20 (EB n°20). In 1644, D. Gastão erected a chapel dedicated to Nossa Senhora da Restauração (lit. Our Lady of Restoration) near his palace, a structure that no longer endures. The palace boasted its private river quay, situated where the current rua da Manutenção exists, featuring remnants still observable.

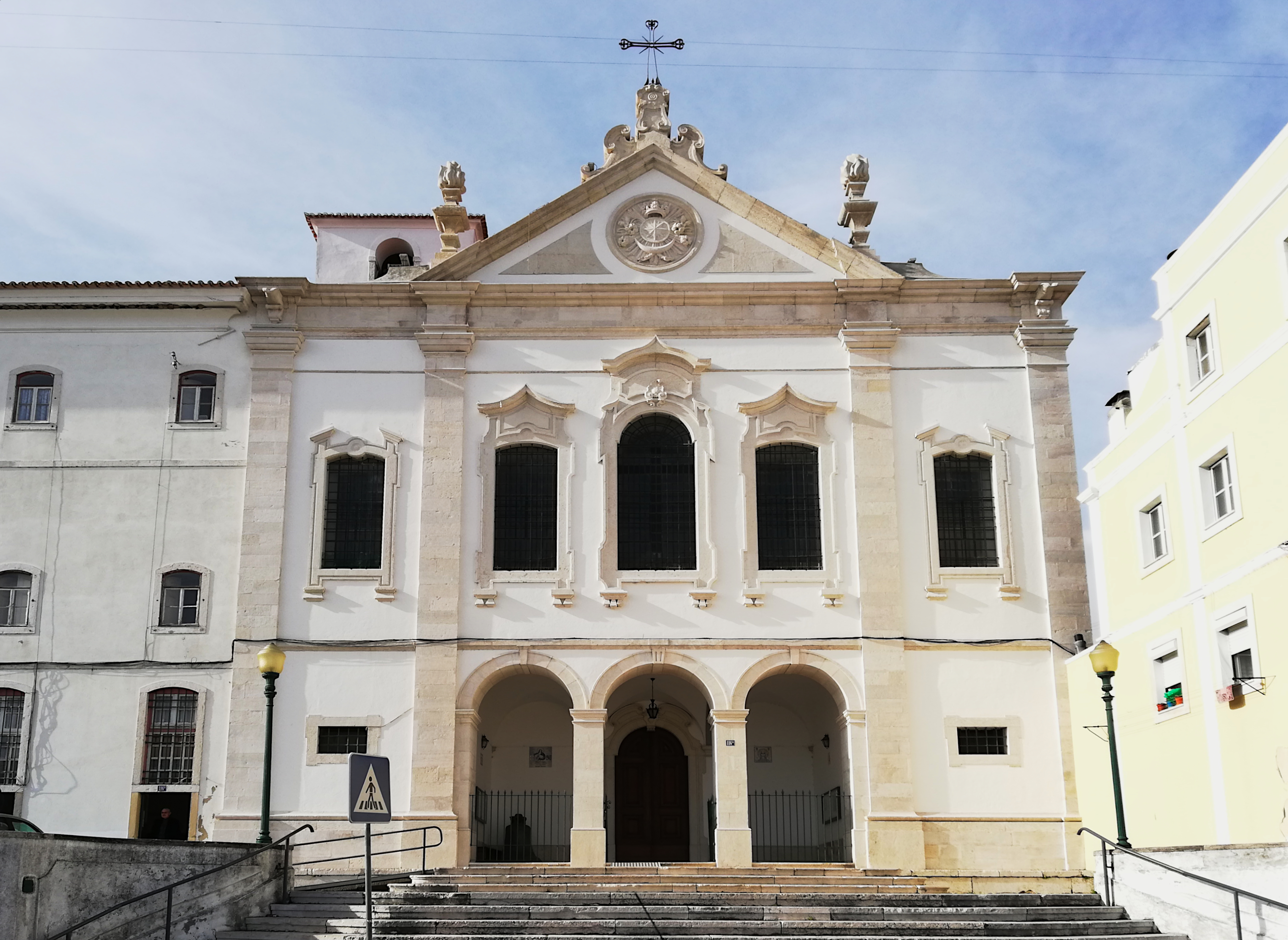
Church of São Bartolomeu do Beato, built in the XVII century

In 1662, Queen D. Luísa de Gusmão withdrew to an estate between Xabregas and Marvila, described as "a very pleasant place on the Tagus River," known as Grilo. There, she founded a convent for Augustinian nuns (on the current site of Manutenção Militar - lit. Military Maintenance) and, nearly opposite, another convent for the Discalced Augustinians (Igreja de S. Bartolomeu e Recolhimento). By the century's end, there were four convents from Xabregas to Beato, and considering another four in proximity (Santa Brígida de Marvila, Chelas, Madre de Deus, and Santos-o-Novo), the presence of friars and nuns within the local populace was substantial.

During the 1755 earthquake, which caused minimal damage in the area, only the Convent of St. Francis suffered significant harm.

Given the local advancements at the time, Beato was chosen as the site to establish one of the city's parishes – the parish of St. Bartholomew. It was in fact created in 1756 with the designation of São Bartolomeu do Beato or São Bartolomeu de Xabregas, separating it from the freguesia of Santa Maria dos Olivais. As one of Lisbon's oldest parishes, St. Bartholomew had its headquarters near the Castle since 1168. Following the earthquake, it temporarily relocated to the ermida de Nossa Senhora do Rosário (lit. chapel of Our Lady of the Rosary) and later settled in the church of Beato António, also known as St. Benedict of Xabregas.

The transition of the parish from the Castle to Beato necessitated the delineation of a new territory, involving a portion of the Santa Engrácia parish and another segment taken from the Santa Maria dos Olivais parish. By the late 18th century, the parish of Beato comprised 380 households and 1,500 inhabitants. Historians, based on testimonies from chroniclers of the time, argue that the parish, as an institution, exhibited stable and lasting characteristics, and that the population maintained constant and affectionate contact with the parish throughout their lives.

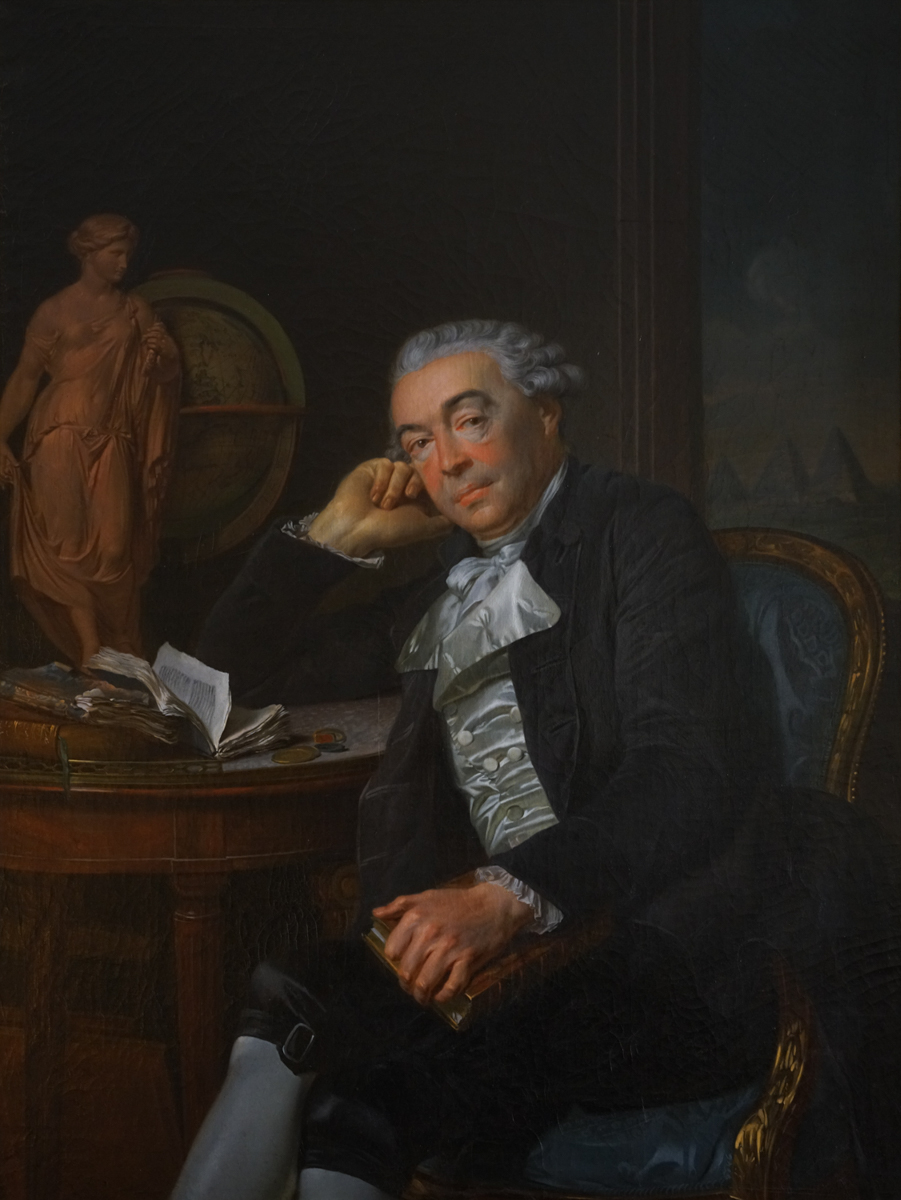
João Carlos de Bragança, 2nd Duke of Lafões (1719-1806). An important political figure between the second half of the 18th century and the early 19th century, he continued the construction of the homonymous palace after the death of his older brother

In 1777, the Duke of Lafões Palace was erected, and in 1785, the initial industrial facilities were established in the Vale de Chelas – two calico printing factories.

In 1814, three textile printing factories had already taken root in the Vale de Chelas; however, the authentic metamorphosis of the rural landscape in Xabregas-Beato commenced with the dissolution of monastic orders following the liberal revolution of 1832-34.

The dissolution of the Monastic Orders led the Government to decree the transfer of the Parish to the Convent of the Franciscan Friars of Our Lady of Jesus in Xabregas, where the Tobacco Company would later be established. However, the change did not materialize due to opposition from the people, as the temple was in poor condition due to profanations and looting during the liberal uprisings. Consequently, the Government had to backtrack, and finally, in November 1835, the Parish was established at the Convento de Nossa Senhora da Conceição do Monte Olivete (lit. Convent of Our Lady of Conception of Mount Olivet). Later, the convent was sold to various individuals, one of them being João de Brito, an industrialist who established a biscuit factory and cereal milling. The factory would later give rise to the Companhia Industrial Portugal e Colónias (lit. Industrial Company Portugal and Colonies).

The initial significant industrial entities were established within religious buildings or palaces. The Companhia de Fiação e Tecidos Lisbonense (lit. Lisbon Textile Spinning Company) was the pioneering factory to set up shop in Xabregas, taking residence in the Convent of St. Francis of Xabregas. The industrialisation and bourgeois expansion, facilitated by Liberalism, were pivotal factors in the transformation of the landscape of this parish, observed from the mid-19th century onwards.

In 1835, the Convent of Grilos, devoid of friars, accommodated the Recolhimento de Nossa Senhora do Amparo, which had relocated from Mouraria. The church subsequently became the parish headquarters of St. Bartholomew of Beato in 1836, transferring from the nearby Convent of Beato António. Despite the swift transformations underway, this area remained a delightful space and continued to be a favored destination for Sunday strolls among the people of Lisbon.

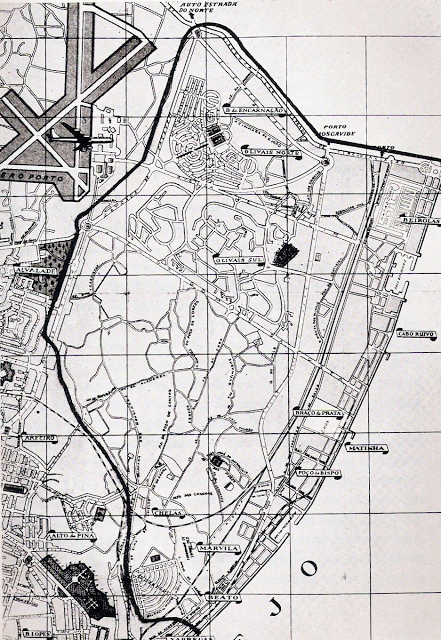
Reproduction of the original area of the parish of Olivais, including Beato

In 1852, new city limits were defined, and the Estrada da Circunvalação de Lisboa (lit. Circumvalation Road) was constructed, placing the Beato parish outside the city boundaries. Simultaneously, the municipality of Olivais was established, and the Beato parish was integrated into it until 1886. The proximity to the Tagus was undoubtedly a decisive contribution to the industrialisation of Beato. The inauguration of the railway in 1856 marked a significant event on multiple fronts, not only for the revitalization of industry but also for the alteration of the local landscape, achieved through the removal of barriers and the construction of infrastructures such as the Viaduto de Xabregas(originally designed in iron by engineers John Sutherland and Valentine C.L. in 1834, later replaced with concrete and masonry in 1954). The need to transport goods would lead to the expansion of the Port of Li, from East London to Cabo Ruivo.

Another historical milestone occurred in 1854 with the establishment of the Fábrica de Fiação de Xabregas (lit. Xabregas Spinning Factory), owned by foreigners, which commenced operations in 1858 after incorporating as the Companhia do Fabrico de Algodões (lit. Cotton Manufacturing Company). Alongside the factories erected, mainly repurposed from religious houses, residences for working-class families, typically the most deprived, began to be constructed. Thus, the Workers' Villages (Vilas operárias) came into existence. As an initiative of the factory owners, the first workers' villages in Xabregas were constructed in 1867 and 1877. In 1888, two larger villages, Vila Flamiano (initially designated for masters and foremen) and Vila Dias (for workers), were built. A total of 106 houses were constructed in the workers' neighborhood of the Cotton Manufacturing Company. Other notable workers' villages found in Beato include Vila Amélia Gomes, Vila Maria Luisa, Vila Emília, Vila Rogélia (partly demolished by 2011) and Vila Moreno. At the same time, notable residences were built in the parish, such as Palacete Dom José de Bragança or Quinta das Pintoras (now both used as event venues).

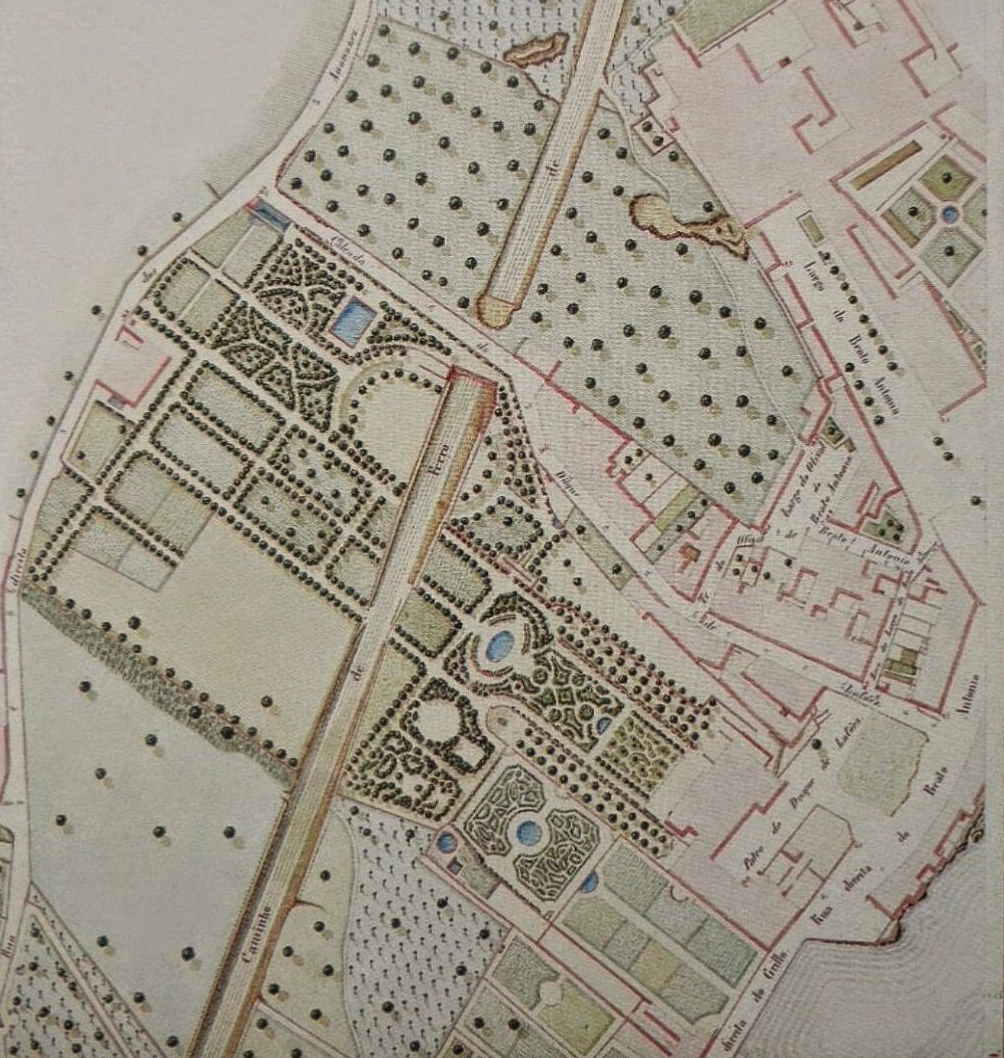
Atlas of the topographic map of Lisbon, Filipe Folque 1856-1858

Equally significant was the founding of the Fábrica de Fiação de Tecidos Oriental (lit. Oriental Fabric Spinning Factory) in 1888 on Xabregas Street (now housing a shopping center), employing 425 workers. Warehouses and drugstores existed on rua de Xabregas (Xabregas Street) and rua do Grilo (Grilo Street). In the late 19th century, between 800 and 1,000 workers were employed in the factories of Xabregas, giving rise to a strong associative movement, including the establishment of the cooperative "A Xabreguense" in 1903 (Beco dos Toucinheiros) and the Cooperativa Operária Oriental (lit. Oriental Cooperative Operative, in Largo de Dom Gastão). Fears of a workers' revolt, stemming from previous strikes and struggles by workers in various factories in the area, led to the establishment of a police station in Vila Dias.

In 1896, the Cozinhas Económicas (lit. economic kitchens) were inaugurated on rua de Xabregas, 44, ensuring a minimum of sustenance for many working-class families facing challenging living, working, and housing conditions. The following year, in 1897, Convento das Grilas was transformed into a bread factory for the army.

By 1900, Beato had 2,215 households and 10,398 inhabitants. According to the historian Alberto Pimentel, in the early 20th century (in 1908) the following industrial units existed in Beato:

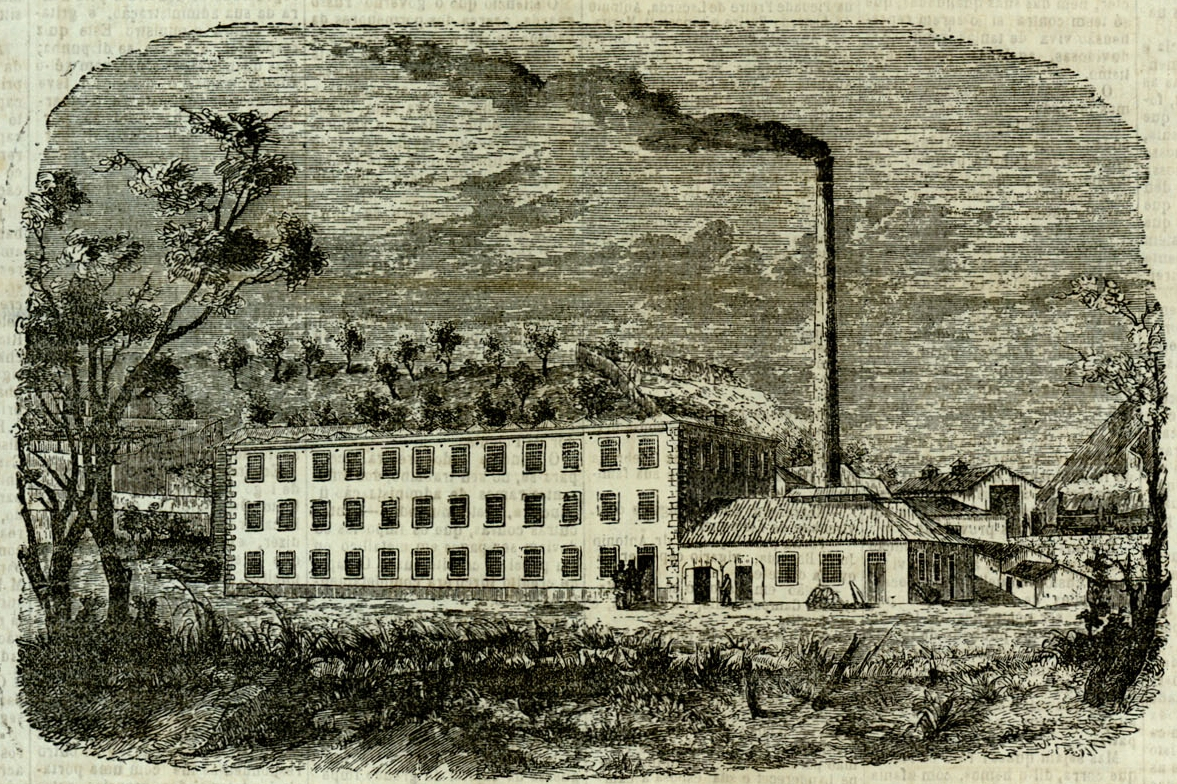
Drawing of the Samaritana factory, in the Xabregas zone, in Lisbon, Portugal. It was founded in 1854

The coat of arms of the parish (by Eduardo Lourenço Brito) also reminds of its industrial past. for instance, the tobacco leaves invoke the old factory of the Tobacco Company, the gear wheel symbolizes the recent industrial past of the parish and the wavy blue and silver base represents the Tagus River, the main communication route chosen by industries to transport their products.

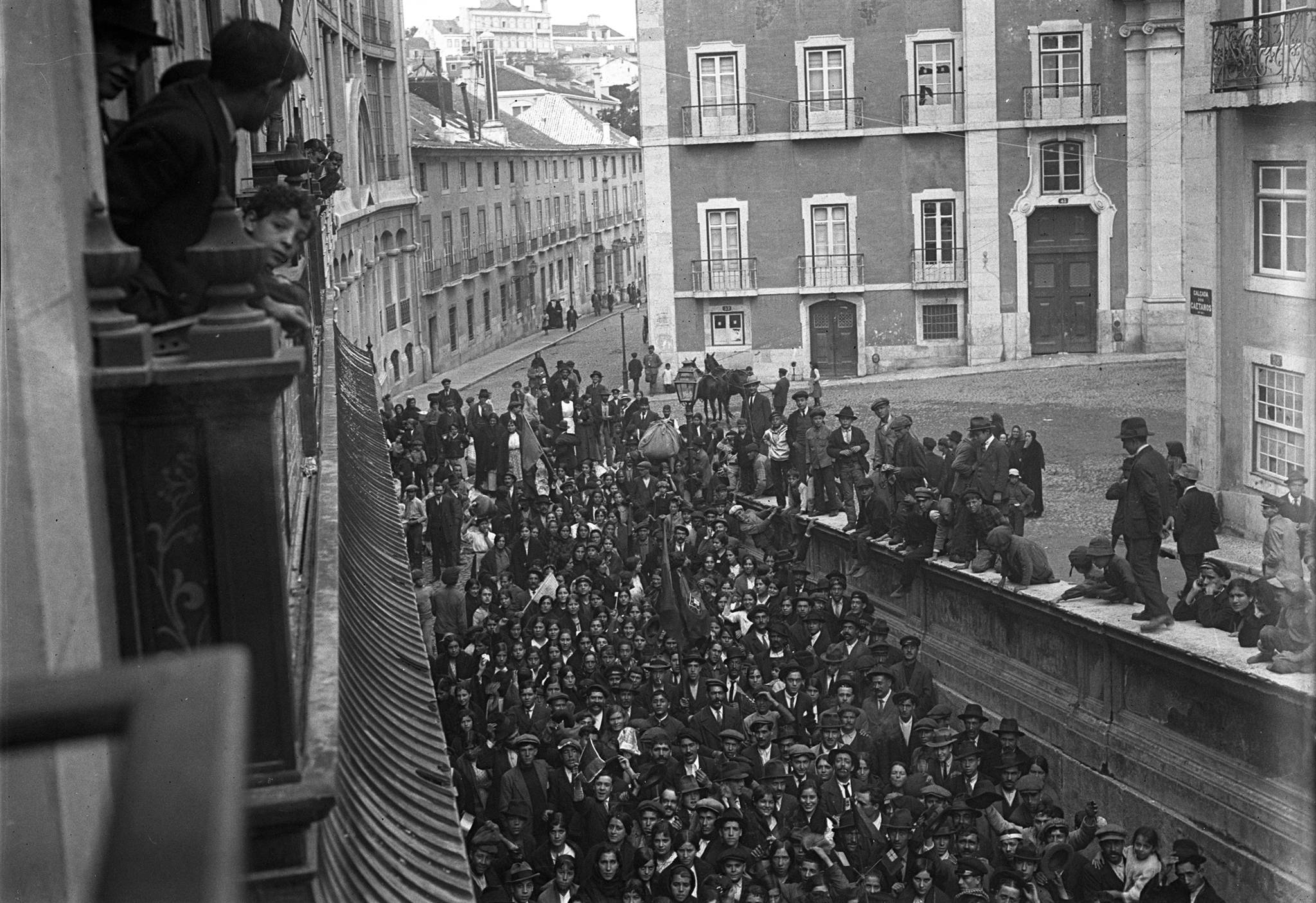
Workers from Companhia dos Tabacos (Xabregas) in November 1918

Due to the demographic explosion of the parish, in 1918 the new parish of Penha de França was created. The newly formed parish detached from Beato had a population of 12,555 according to the 1920 census. Despite this, Beato only experienced a decrease of 2,354 people from 1911 to 1920 census, meaning that the population of the part of the parish that stayed within Beato's boundaries actually rose by 10,201. Taking this in account, the parish of Beato-Penha de França (or Beato only until 1911) rose from 17,204 inhabitants in 1911 to 27,405 (or +59.29%) in just 10 years, underlying the economic vitality of the area in the early XX century.

Later, in 1922, fiscal barriers at the city entrance were abolished, and in 1925, the third phase of the construction of the Port of Lisbon commenced. At that time, the area was described as a "bustling industrial hub, resonating with activity, factories, workshops, warehouses, docks, railways, a vibrant life that central Lisbon only perceives when passing by tram under the train viaduct, indifferent to its existence".

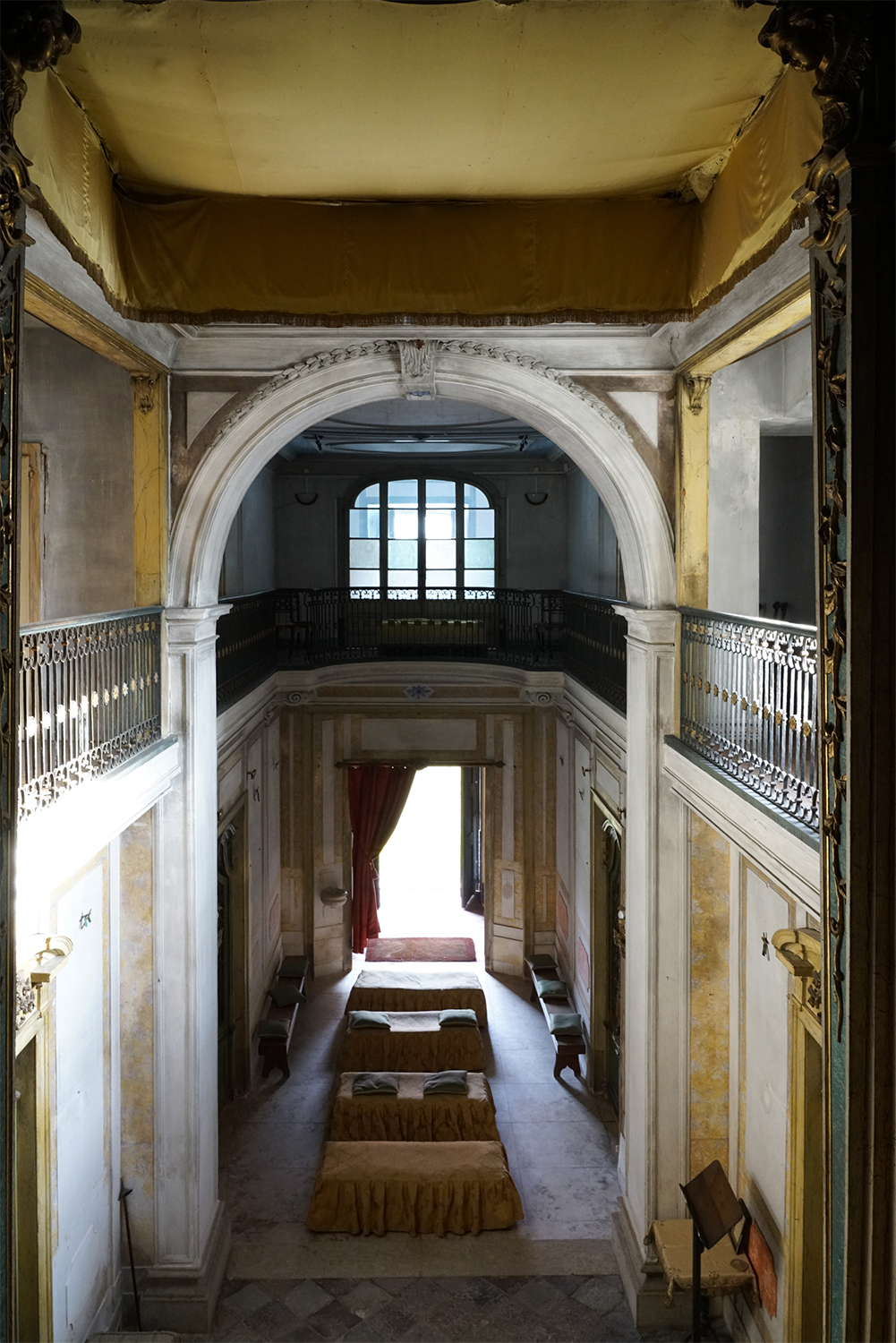
Chapel in Palácio do Grilo

In 1932 the Beato firefighters' association was established.

In 1933, in Vila Maria Luísa, there was a primary school for boys (Primary School No. 20), and aspirations for the parish included facilities such as a girls' school, a public bathhouse, a market, and infrastructure such as lighting, water supply, and sewage.

In the early 1940s, the construction of the Madre de Deus social housing project began, the Avenida Infante Dom Henrique (lit. Prince Henry the Navigator avenue) was opened: it is the longest avenue in Lisbon, measuring around 12 km and stretching along the river. Moreover, the Port of Lisbon Improvement Plan was initiated. In 1944, the sports association of Vitória Clube de Lisboa was established; it still is, as of today, one of the largest cultural associations found in the parish.

In 1948 the historical football club Império Clube de Portugal was formed; it was later dismantled in 1991. It had its headquarters in Calçada da Picheleira.

In the 1950s, the Mercado de Xabregas (lit. Xabregas Market) was inaugurated, and the parish underwent administrative restructuring in 1959, establishing boundaries practically identical to the current ones.

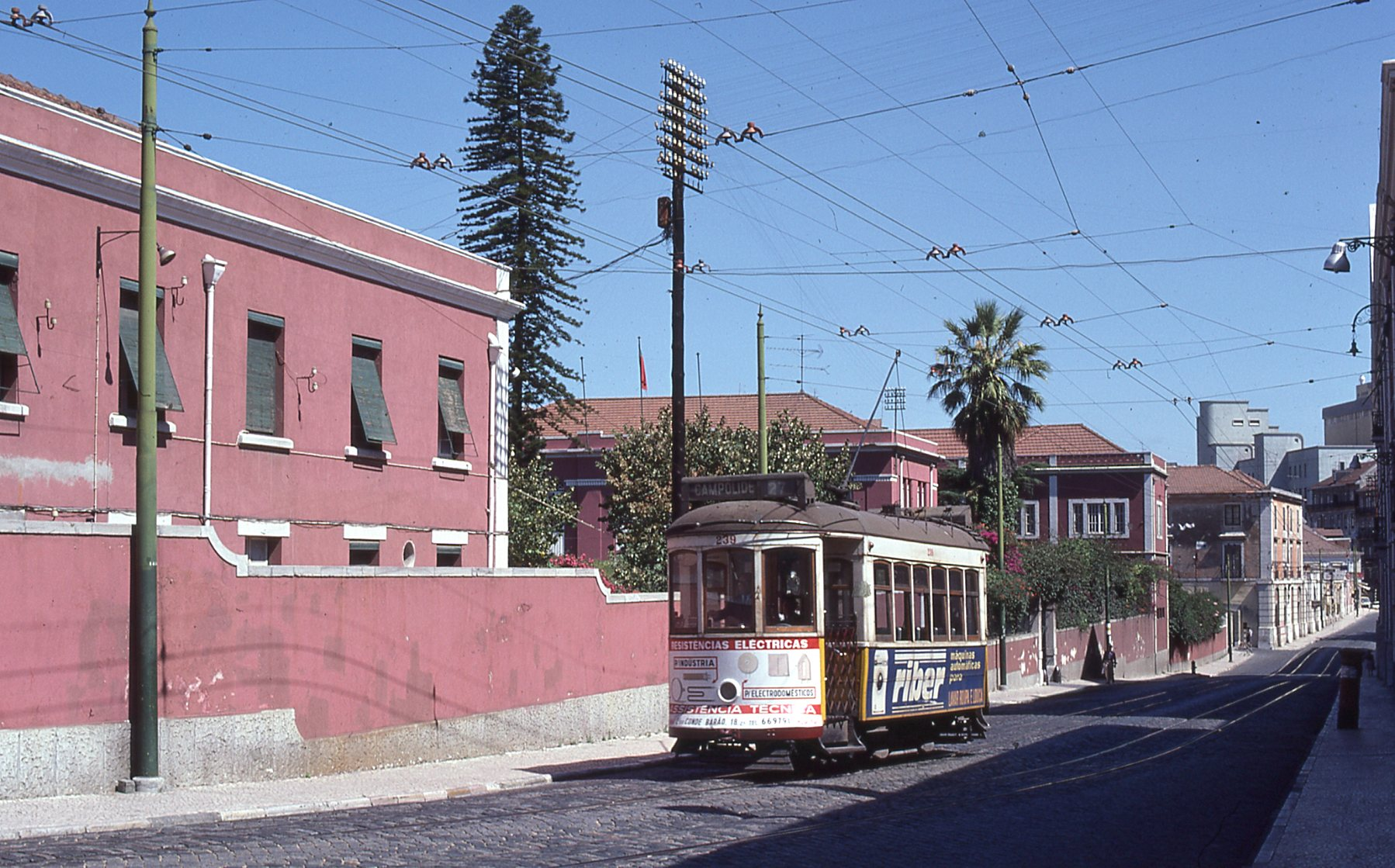
Rua do Grilo in 1977

In 1965, the initial urbanization plan for Chelas envisioned transforming the industrial area of Vale de Chelas into an urbanized space. Urban expansion as well as relocation of factories in the outskirts of Lisbon meant the abandonment of most factories However, by the 1970s, the locale's image was described as a desolate "factory graveyard", a portrayal that still defines the landscape today.

The area of Vale de Chelas, as we know it today, reflects the industrial landscape of the last century, currently recognised as the "factory cemetery." From that era when Beato was rural, today, little more than the small gardens of Vale de Chelas remain. The Plano de Urbanização do Vale de Chelas (Plan for the urbanization of the Chelas valley) plan arises from the necessity to rejuvenate an old and dilapidated area, envisioning its rehabilitation concerning housing, road infrastructure, sports facilities, social amenities, recreational areas, and security.

Since the late 1980s, the Clube de Rugby do Técnico, one of the main rugby union clubs in Portugal, set out to build his own field in Olaias, leaving Estádio Universitário de Lisboa where it used to play. Here, on the northern border of Beato parish, one of the largest rugby union fields available in Lisbon has been built, serving every year hundreds of practitioners.

In 1985 the musical group Madredeus was established. It is one of the Portuguese musical groups with the greatest worldwide recognition. Their music combines influences from Portuguese popular music and fado, with classical music and contemporary popular music. In their twenty-year career, Madredeus released 14 albums and toured in 41 countries — including North Korea and a music festival within the Arctic Circle, in Norwegian territory — selling more than three million copies.

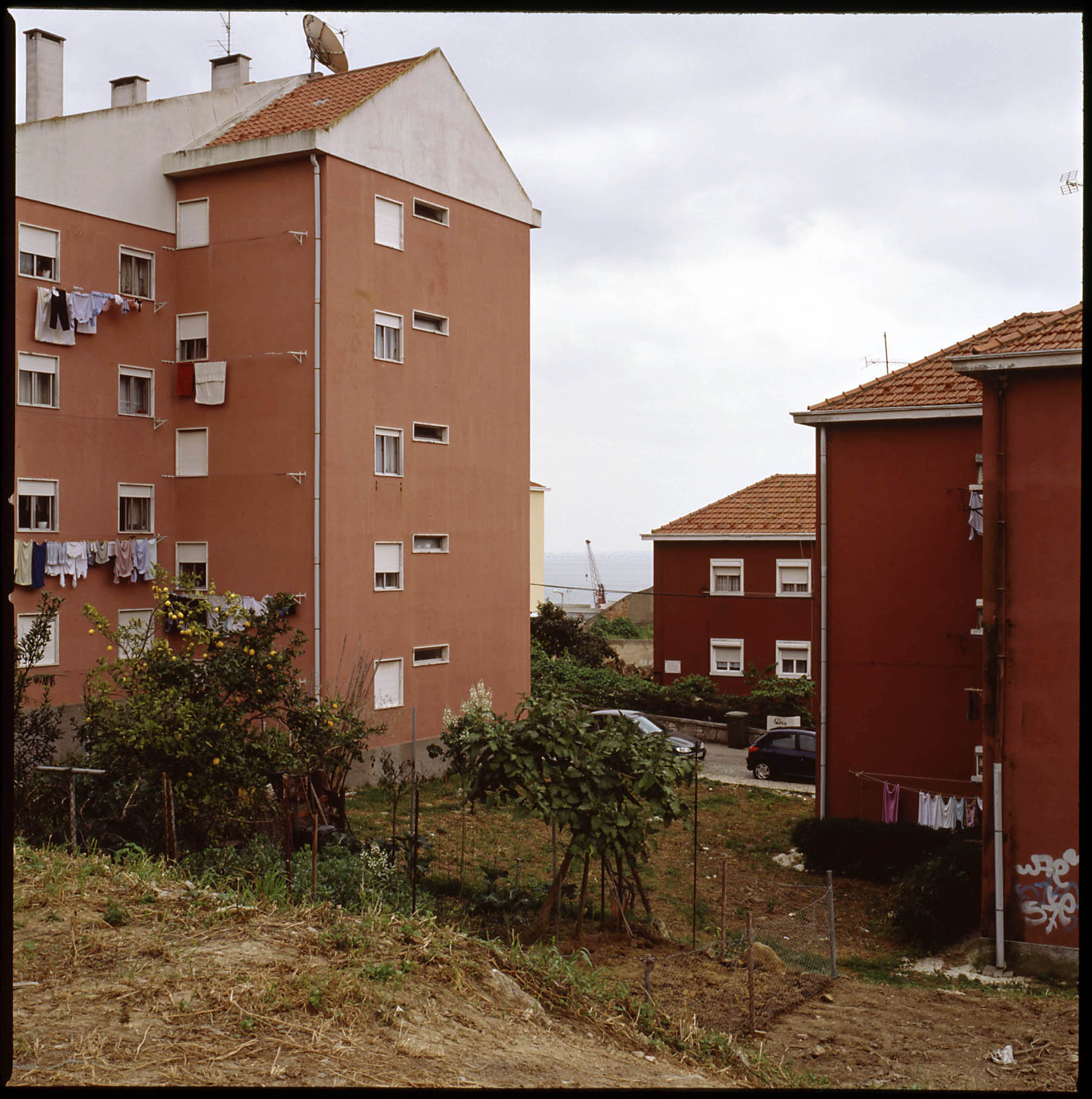
Bairro do Grilo, public housing in Beato

To eradicate shacks and provide everyone with access to tap water, electricity and sanitation, from 1993 the PER (Programa Especial de Realojamento) was implemented. It was estimated that in 1993 almost 40,000 people lived in shanty towns in Lisbon (or 9.1% of the city population). Between 1993 and the early 2000 more than 32,000 families and more than 132,000 people were relocated across the whole country, almost 1,000 slums were destroyed across 28 municipalities and almost 35,000 government-fund dwellings were built. In particular, in Lisbon were built more than 9,000 public dwellings totaling an investment of over 600 million euros (€).

Beato was heavily interested by the PER and it is estimated that the two neighbourhoods of (new) Carlos Botelho Neighbourhood, Quinta dos Ourives, Grilo and the Rua João Nascimento Costa, built between 1999 and 2001, house around 3,381 people, or more than 27.75% of the total population of the parish. In Beato were identified 512 families living in shacks in 1993: by 2001 the overwhelming majority had been relocated to public housing built in the late nineties-early 2000s. As of 2013 only 9 families were recorded as living in shacks in the areas designated as shanty towns in the 1993 inquiry.

In the years 1999 to 2001, Beato saw the demolition of the vast majority of its shanty towns, namely Casal do Pinto, Carlos Botelho, Quinta dos Embrechados and part of Bairro Chinês, the biggest slum in eastern Lisbon, mainly located in neighbouring Marvila. In these locations, new developments emerged.

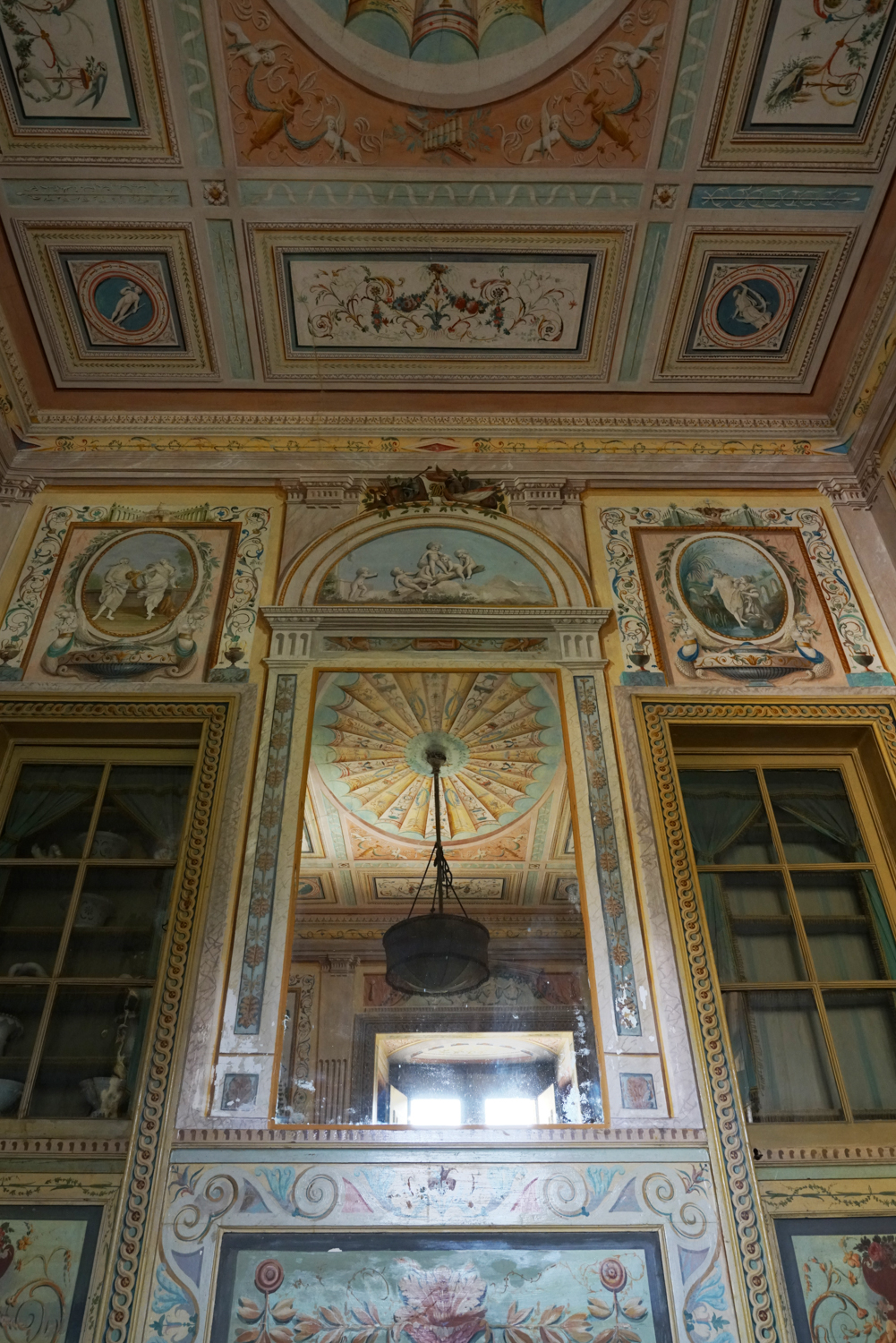
Chinese room in Palácio do Grilo

Starting from 1999, around 860 families were relocated in the neighbourhood of Quinta dos Ourives (lit. goldsmiths farm neighbourhood) from the shanty towns located mainly in Alfama and Mouraria (es. TV. do Jordão). The neighbourhood was first built in 1970 during the Estado Novo regime but it was substantially expanded in 1996–1999 with the PER. The complex was finished in 1999 and comprises 53 buildings hosting 646 dwellings. There are 1,809 estimated dwellers, with each family paying a controlled rent of €83.9 per month. The shanty towns were completely demolished shortly after the relocation was completed. Because of the celerity with which the neighbourhood was built, since 2005 a number of issues has been detected because of poor construction.

Due to urbanisation works occurring in the late 1990s, Avenida Carlos Pinhão, now one of the largest streets in Lisbon, was inaugurated. It crosses the valley of Chelas, linking Areeiro (where there is also a small green area) to Eastern Lisbon (Beato and Marvila). Other streets opened to serve the new government-fund neighbourhoods include Azinhaga da Salgada (whose name come from a villa existing there since the XVIII century but later destroyed).

In 2010, the works for the establishment of the first high-speed train line started. The works were aimed at building a new viaduct as well as improving existing facilities. The initial part of the works, for which 24M euros (€) had been invested, was never completed, due to the financial crisis that hit Portugal in 2010-14, that subsequently led to the Portuguese Bailout Programme, through which the country - facing a status of bankruptcy - had to request financial assistance to the IMF (at the time managed by Dominique Strauss-Kahn) and the European Financial Stability Facility, like Greece and Ireland had done before.

Beato area before and after the 2012 Portuguese administrative reform

With the 2012 Administrative Reform, the parish of Beato experienced minor territorial changes. In particular, it gained land area to Marvila and Areeiro while suffered minor territorial losses to Penha de França.

In 2016, the Ministry of Defence gave Lisbon municipality its buildings in former Manutenção Militar, for the development of Hub Criativo do Beato. The buildings dated from 1772 and occupied an area of over 35,000 square meters. After extensive works and a renal price of 7.1M euros (€), the formerly neglected location in Travessa do Grilo - featured in 2018 Portuguese novel O Mistério do Caso de Campolide, by Francisco Moita Flores - hosts now numerous cultural events, especially revolving around cinema and Portuguese cuisine. The space was first opened to the public in 2018, with the "Lisboa Dance Festival" and the "World Press Photo Exhibition". By 2023 it had become a cultural landmark of the parish.

In July 2022 was created, with the help of volunteers as well as with the participation of members from all walks of life, the "biggest street art work" in Portugal, consisting in decorating 3.8 km of the wall separating the bike lane in Avenida Infante D. Henrique from the port of Lisbon. Between 2022 and 2023 artists such as Bordallo II and Styler decorated areas in the neighbourhood (e.g. Azinhaga da Bruxa) supported by the Urban Art Gallery project; the murals reflect the heritage, fauna and flora of the Madredeus neighborhood and the Carnation Revolution. Always in 2022, there have been multiple interventions aiming at promoting street art through murals in the parish. For instance, a mural tribute to women appeared in Xabregas and children were encouraged to give new life to multiple walls in Bairro Carlos Botelho neighbourhood thanks to Onda do Bairro (lit. neighbourhood wave) project, funded by Fundação Aga Khan Portugal. In 2023 the new mural Fauna E Flora Da Mata Da Madre De Deus was inaugurated, depicting fauna and flora found in the parish's parks.

In 2023, due to the Portuguese housing crisis, the complete rehabilitation of Vila Dias - a vila operária acquired by the municipality in 2020 for 3.8M euros (€) - was announced. The site, comprising around 160 houses, will be completely restored. It has also been announced the construction of 72 new dwellings in the same area. The whole project is due to be completed by 2026. In the same year the new creche do Casal do Pinto (casal do Pinto kindergarten) was opened, as part of an investment plan of 107M euros (€) in schools and kindergartens up to 2026; the works for an additional kindergarten in the Parish (Azinhaga do Planeta) are underway.

In 2024 the Unidade de Saúde do Beato, a brand new hospital designed to serve up to 15,000 people, was inaugurated. The investment, around 3M euros (€) had long been waited in the parish and is expected to enhance the living conditions of the population.

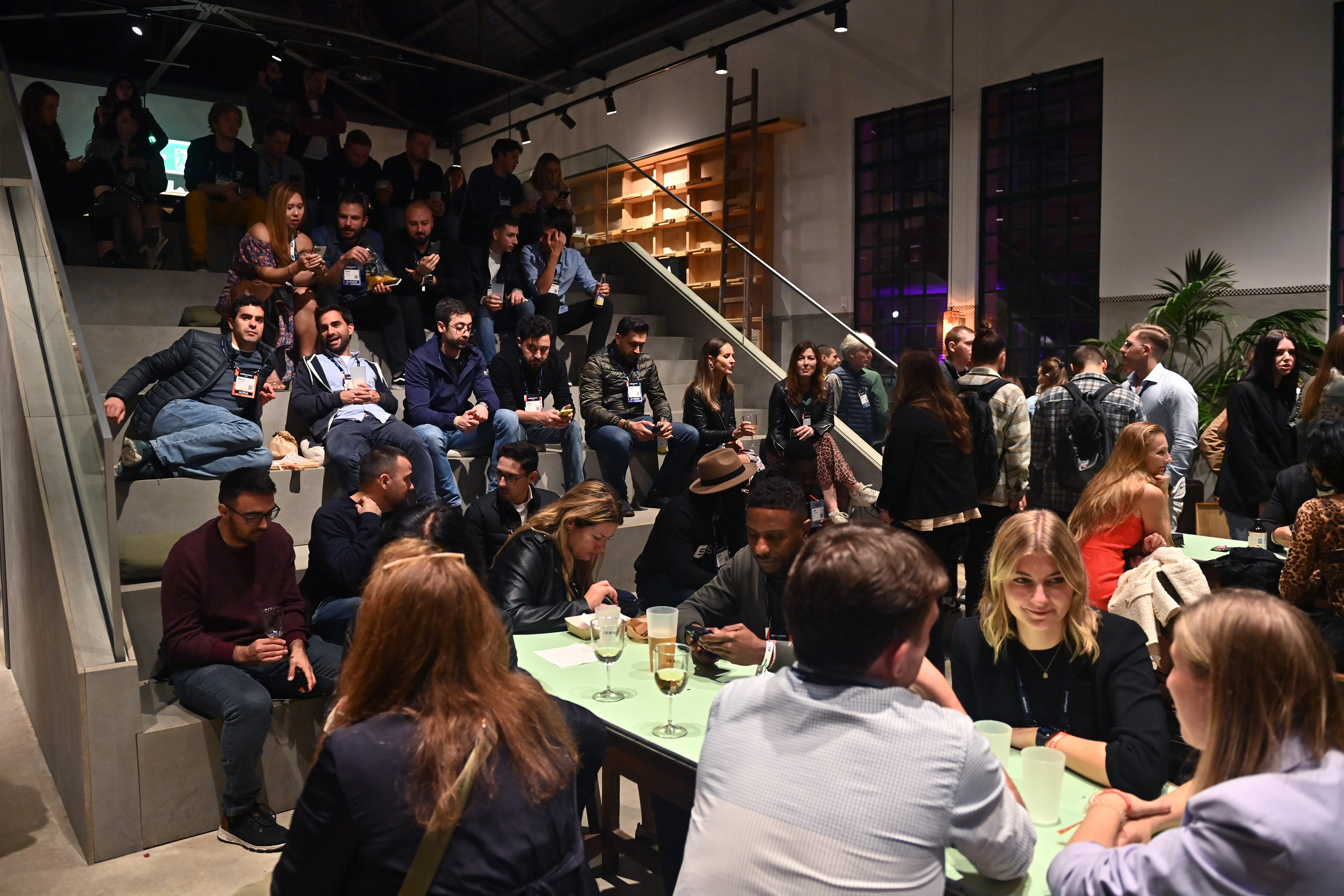
Event in Hub Criativo do Beato

One of the largest events that has happened in Beato in the XXI century has been the constructionof the Hub Criativo do Beato. It was born as an idea to boost the entrepreneurship environment in Lisbon and is often called in Portuguese media Fábrica de Unicórnios (lit. Unicorn factory). The construction began in 2017, with an initial investment of 8M euros (€) for helping 20 scaleups per year to establish themselves in Lisbon. After extensive renovation works, it is now one of the largest spaces for entrepreneurship and innovation in Europe. It welcomes more than 3 thousand people from all over the world who want to produce innovation, along with a wide range of catering, leisure and cultural services and equipment, open to the entire city, being a place for entrepreneurs, startups, scaleups, investors, incubators and talented professionals dedicated to the future of technological and digital innovation.

== Demographics ==
Historical population
Year	Pop.	±%
1960	20,129	—
1970	20,146	+0.1%
1981	20,718	+2.8%
1991	17,494	−15.6%
2001	14,241	−18.6%
2011	12,737	−10.6%
2021	12,183	−4.3%
Source: INE

The resident population recorded according to Censuses carried over the years is shown in the following table for Beato. It is noteworthy that Beato lost 8,535 people from 1981 to 2021 or 41.2% of its 1981 population in just 40 years, not having recorded a single population gain since 1981.

== Education ==
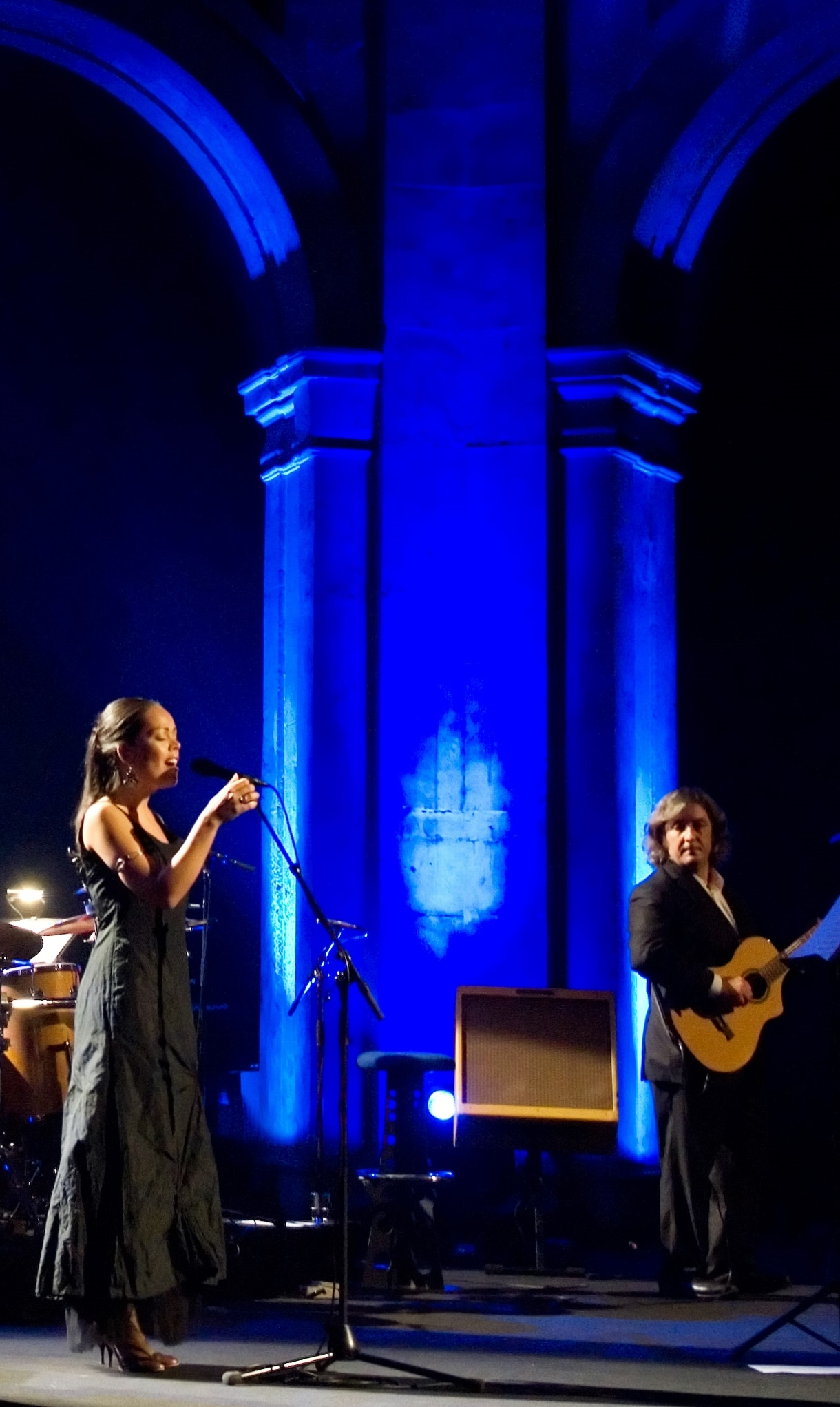
Performance in Teatro Ibérico, 2008

According to the last census (2021) in Beato the proportion of people aged 15–24 having completed the terceiro ciclo do ensino básico (schooling up to age 14) and currently not enrolled in the educational system was roughly 46.62%, with almost half of males aged 15–24 not in education. The proportion of youth in the abovementioned situation is considerably higher in Beato than Lisbon as a whole (35.06%).

== Economy ==
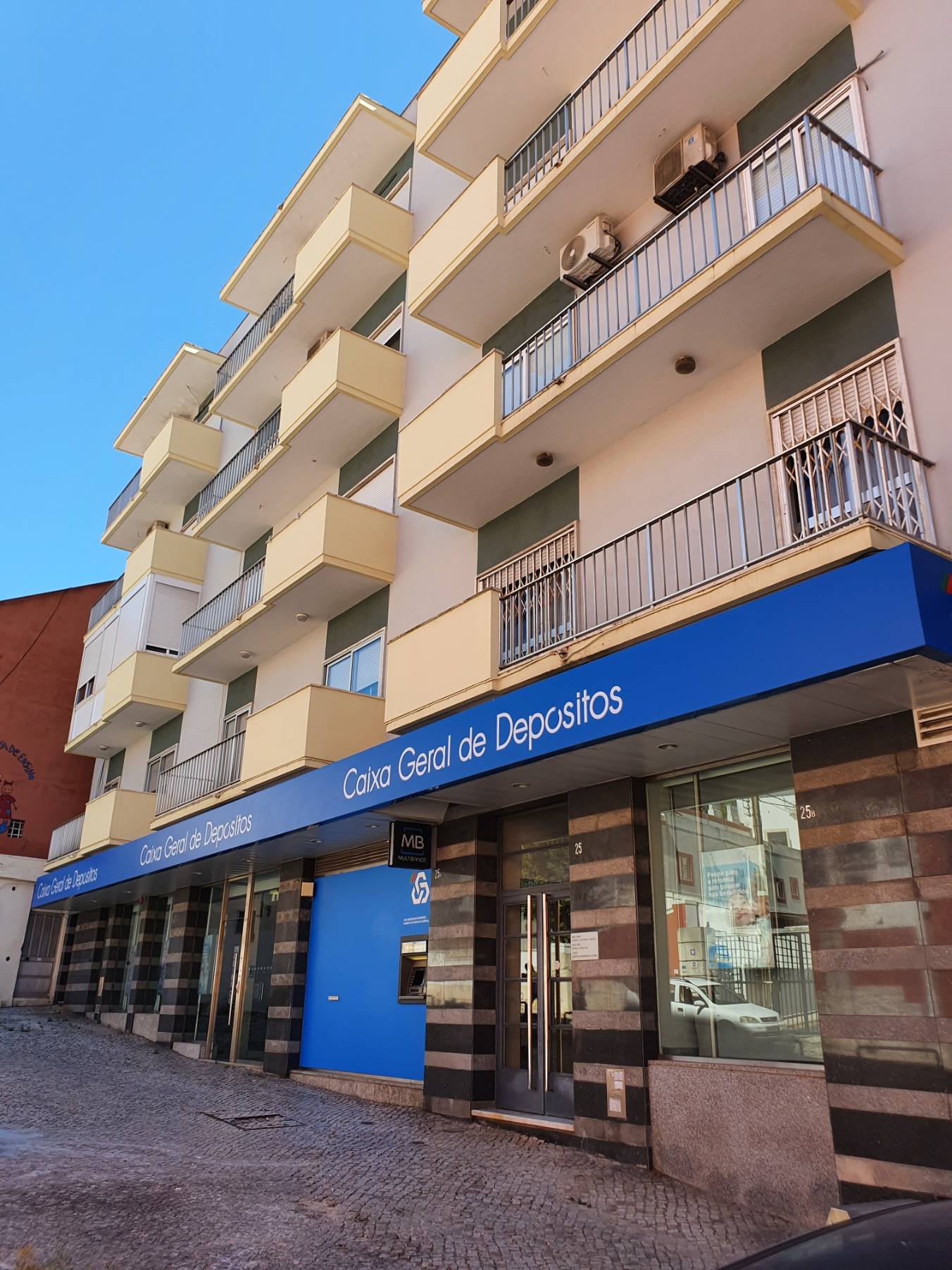
Xabregas streetview with Caixa ATM

In the parish of Beato there are 734 residents who, as of 2021, were unemployed. Of these, 45.08% received a state-fund subsidy or pension (41.34% in Lisbon). In 2021 the unemployment rate in the parish is considerably higher than the one recorded for Lisbon and for Portugal as a whole, standing at 12.85%. In the same year, Portugal as a whole had an unemployment rate of 8.13% that has progressively decreased to 6.1% in 2023. As the statistics dealing with unemployment at the parish level are available only every 10 years, the current (2023) unemployment rate in Beato is unknown. Amongst youth aged 15–24 the unemployment rate in 2021 in the Parish stood at 25.47%, 36.35% higher than in the rest of the country.

On the other hand, in 2021 4,966 residents were employed, of which 75.80% were employees and 20.96% were independent workers. Below is the table showing the employment rate per age group. The low share of people aged 20–24 employed is due to the fact that many are still in education (e.g. university) while the low proportion of those in employment aged 60–64 is due to many being early pensioners.

2021 Census data	Age group								
2021 Census data	20-24	25-29	30-34	35-39	40-44	45-49	50-54	55-59	60-64
Share of people in employment	41.93%	70.70%	73.18%	78.40%	75.41%	73.97%	71.37%	62.53%	42.82%

Dealing with commuting, the residents of Beato spent 25.42 minutes of daily commuting, 3 minutes more than the average inhabitant of Lisbon.

== Landmarks ==
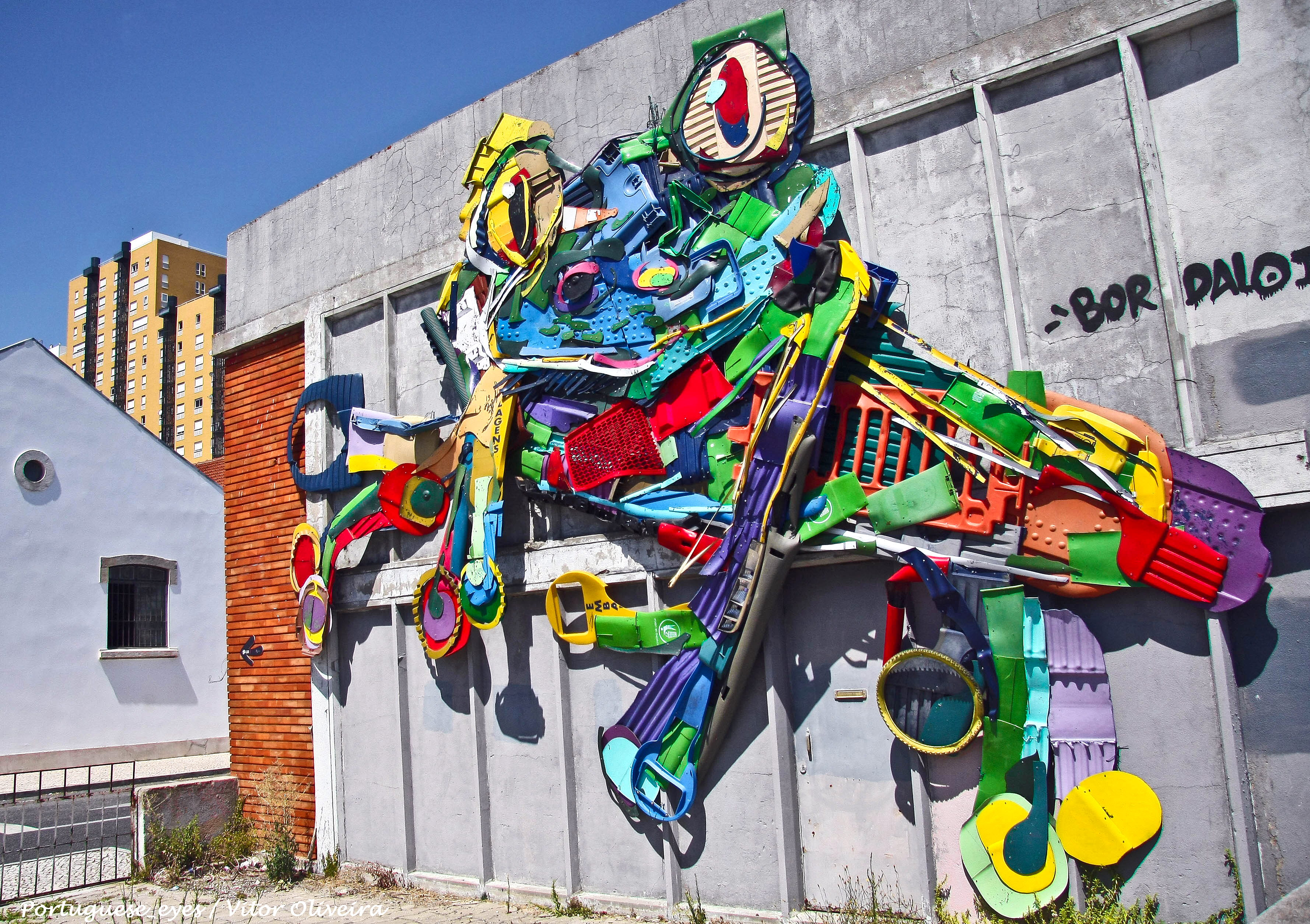
Bordalo II frog sculpture

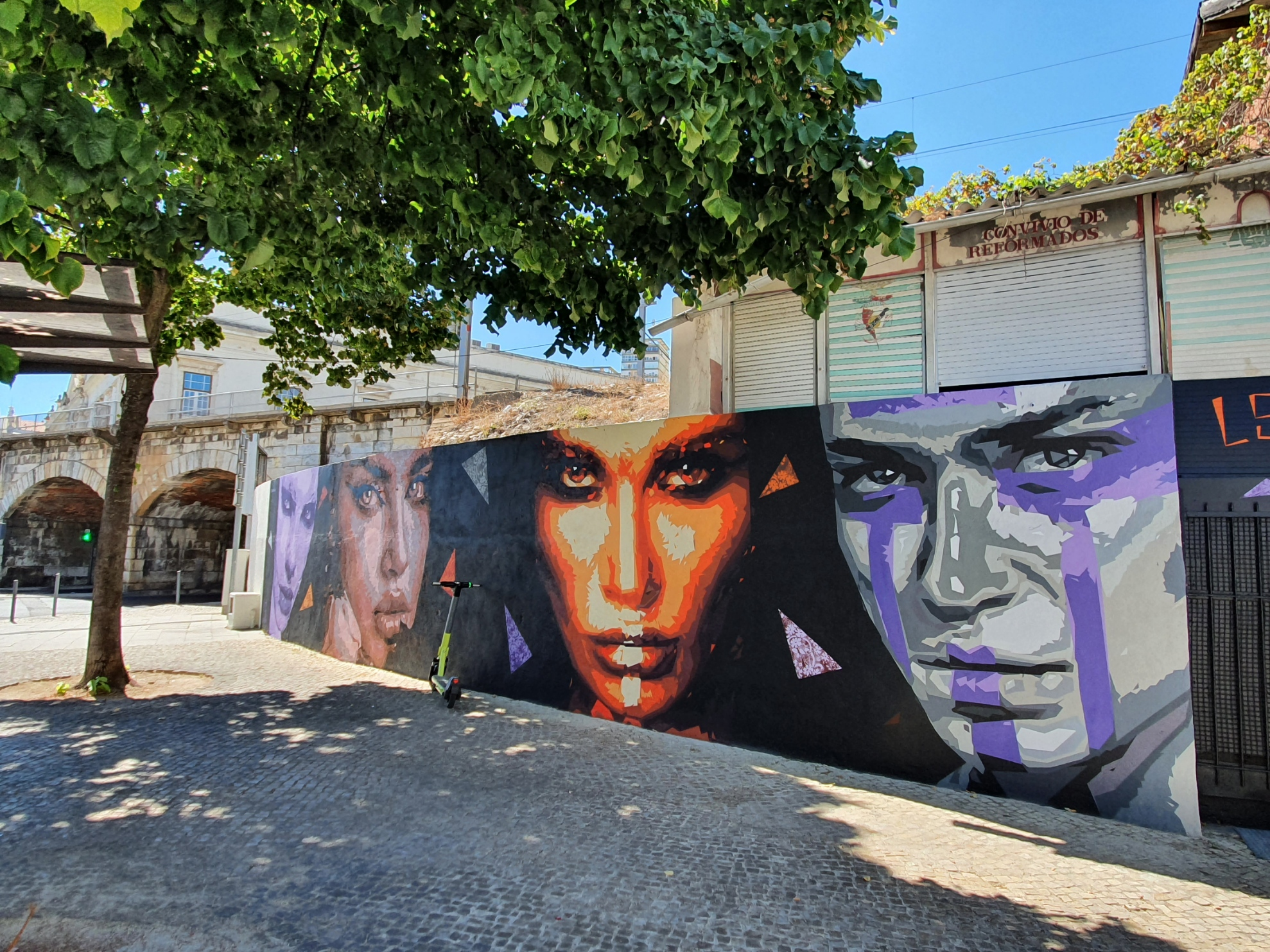
Mural in Xabregas

- Bordalo II monkey sculpture: Installation by Bordalo II created in 2017
- Bordalo II frog sculpture: Installation by Bordalo II created in 2017
- Convento de São Francisco de Xabregas: Today hosting Teatro Ibérico, also known as Convento de Santa Maria de Jesus. It previously hosted the Paço Real de D. Afonso III since the XIII century (Paço Real de Enxobregas)
- CNE Museum: Portuguese scouting museum. The premises comfortably accommodate the entire collection and all assets, spanning three floors housing the Museum, the Documentation Center, the Archive, and a warehouse. All areas are meticulously maintained by just five volunteers
- Fábrica "A Nacional" (Antiga Fábrica de Moagem João de Brito): On March 9, 1849, João de Brito received a royal charter to establish a milling factory within the Convent of São João Evangelista, later known as Convento do Beato. In 1908, a bridge was built towards the southern waterfront. By 1917, the factory merged into the National Milling Company
- Former convent of Beato António: convent dating from the 15th century. It is also known as "Convento do Beato" or "Convento de São Bento de Xabregas"
- Igreja e antigo Convento do Grilo: Church and convent dating from 1663. From 1897 onwards, the entire convent area was adapted for the installation of a food industry but it still retains its antique chapel as well as Baroque details and azulejos from the 18th century
- Igreja Paroquial do Espírito Santo: Catholich church
- Murales Projecto Paredes (Carlos Botelho): A projects involving 9 large mural paintings in Carlos Botelho neighbourhood, painted for the Paredes project (2016–18)
- Nicho de Nossa Senhora no Largo da Madre de Deus: 2017 niche and statue
- Palacio do Grilo (also known as Palácio dos Duques de Lafões): Building dating from the 18th century predominantly in Neoclassic style. In the Calçada do Duque de Lafões. ù
- Palácio dos Marqueses de Olhão or Palácio Xabregas: where some of the heroes of the Revolution of 1640, which restored National Independence and broke Castilian rule, once gathered.
- Statue "E entre gente remota edificaram" : Monument inaugurated in 1991

== Culture ==
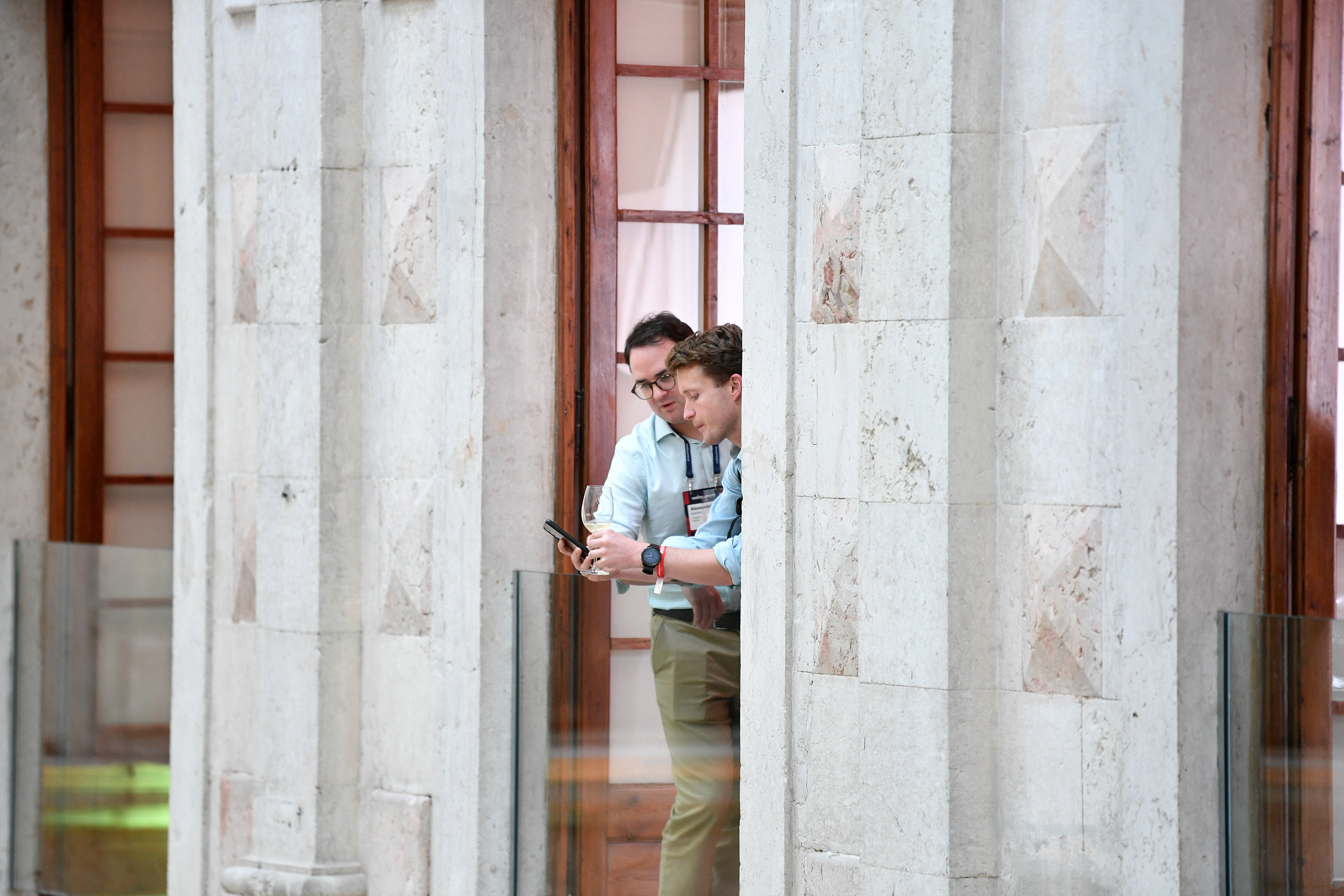
Venture event in Convento do Beato, 2022

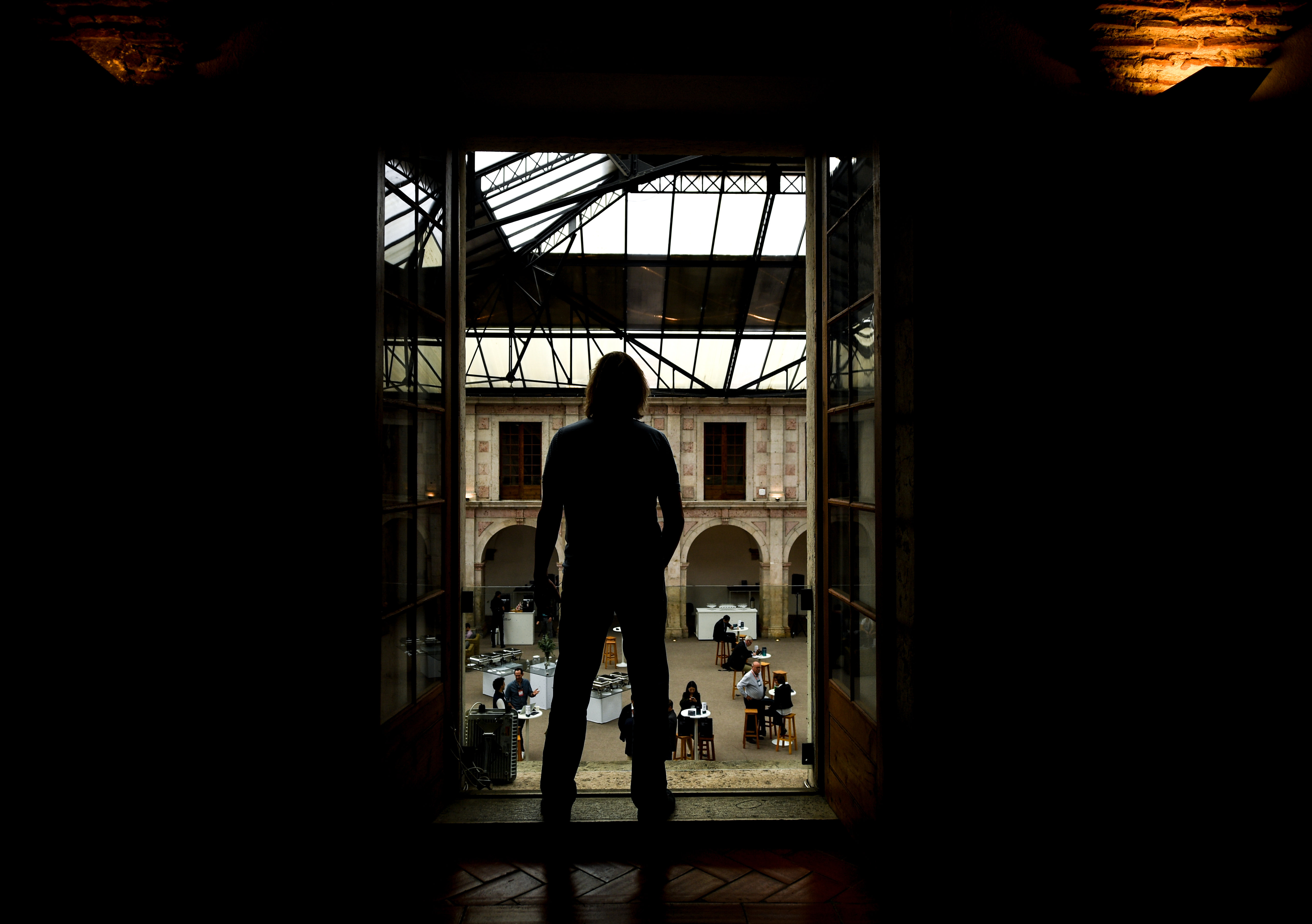
Venture event in Convento do Beato, 2019

The parish hosts many cultural associations, such as Espaço Ideias and Espaço Social (that are parish-owned) or Associação Sócio-Cultural Recreativa e de Melhoramentos de Faifa. ARTemPALCO (established in 2013) and Teatro Ibérico are two associations offering activities dealing with theatres, such as workshops and plays.

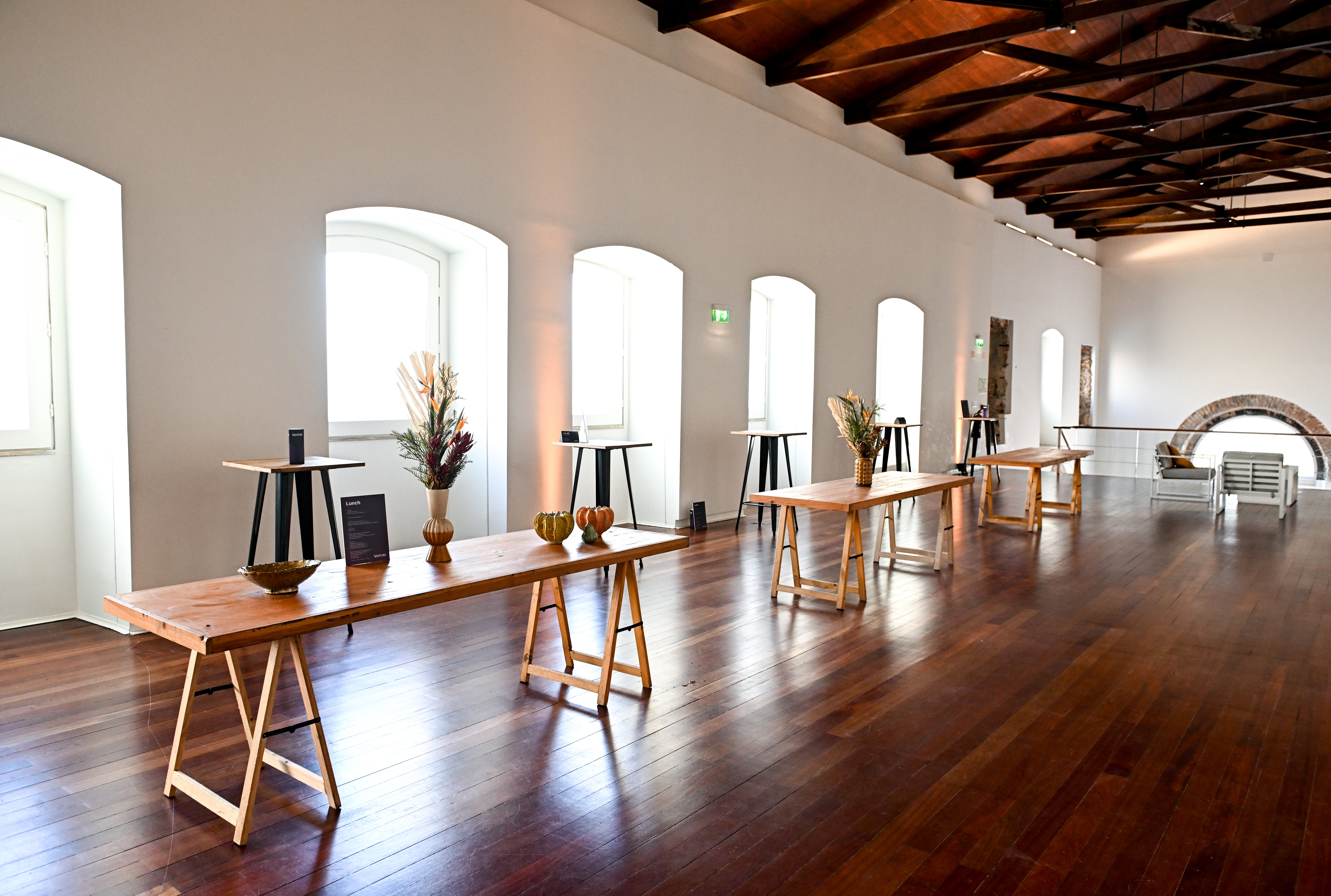
Venture in Convento do Beato, 2023

The parish also organises cultural events, of which the most ancient one is Festival de Folclore do Beato (Beato Folklore festival, annually), established in 1995. Other cultural events occurring in this vibrant parish include, amongst many others:

- Jogos da Freguesia (annually)
- Corrida de Carrinhos de Rolamentos (annually)
- Physical activity day (Dia da Atividade Física)
- European sports week (Semana Europeia do Desporto)
- Encontro de Cavaquinhos do Beato (annually)
- Festival Internacional de Danças (annually)
- Encontro de concertinas do Beato (annually)
- Passeio Melhor idade (annually)
- Gala do Beato (annually, since 2010)
- Magusto Popular (annually)

Moreover, the parish organises periodical workshops or cultural events. There are also often partnerships with local cultural institutions as well as with museums. The parish is also known for organising annually the Medieval fair (Feira medieval do Beato), usually hosted during 3 summer days every year since 2015. Other activities include guided walks, during both day and evenings, through the parish.

Beato is also very active with regards to Marchas Populares, an event celebrating Portuguese Midsummer in which teams that dress up with handmade outfits to march and dance through an open avenue or closed arena to the sound of popular music, mixing motifs of Portuguese summer culture, like "manjerico" and the sea.

== Sport ==
The parish holds active life in high regard and has organised many initiatives aiming at promoting a healthy lifestyle amongst the residents. Beato actively promotes sports amongst its residents through initiatives such as the Community Champions league (football for pre-teens).

There are several sports facilities including:

- Espaço Social: a parish-owned space offering multiple sports courses along the year
- Espaço Ideias: a parish-owned space offering multiple sports courses along the year
- Polidesportivo da Mata Madre de Deus: a large multi-sport venue located in Parque Madre de Deus, the largest park in Beato.

There are also many sports associations providing services to the inhabitants, often in partnership with the parish's council, such as Grupo Recreativo e Cultural Onze Unidos, Associação Desportiva “Os de Bába”, Vitória Clube de Lisboa (that has a large football pitch behind EB Eng. Duarte Pacheco), Clube Desportivo do Beato and Clube de Rugby do Técnico, boasting one of the largest rugby union fields in Lisbon. The parish is also responsible for the many outdoor fitness facilities found within its boundaries. In recent years, investment has grown and facilities such as calisthenics parks are being built throughout the parish. Famous handball player Carlos Resende, often considered amongst the best Portuguese handball players ever, has played for several years for club Ateneu da Madre Deus. In his honour, a tournament for young people named after him was created.

Generally speaking, the parish promotes the adoption of healthy behaviors and lifestyles, as well as acquisition of social and personal skills through Intervir program.

== Gardens and parks ==
The parish hosts several green spaces, notably:

- Parque Urbano da Encosta Nascimento Costa: garden with outdoor fitness facilities and a calisthenics park, built in 2021
- Jardim da Praça Socrates da Costa: garden with a children's playground, spanning over around 1,000 m^{2}.
- Jardim da Calçada da Picheleira: garden with outdoor fitness facilities, spanning over around 2,000 m^{2}.
- Jardim Rua Nova do Grilo: garden built in 2023, spanning over around 4,000 m^{2}
- Parque da Madre de Deus: Hosting a sports park and a children's playground, the park was fully rehabilitated in 2009-2010. It stands where once there were where vacant lots, near the homonymous neighbourhood. It is by far the largest green space in the parish, spanning over 40 Ha.

Moreover, many streets host garden benches and recreational areas.

== Transportation ==
The parish is served by a vast network of public transportation means, including subway and buses. There are plans for the opening of a train station (Chelas-Olaias) as part of Linha de Cintura.

== Notable people ==
- Maria da Assunção de Bragança Mello e Ligne Sousa Tavares Mascarenhas da Silva Câmara: Second wife of Francisco de Sales Gonçalves Zarco da Câmara
- Teodolinda Amélia Cristina Leça da Veiga (1837-1911): Portuguese writer and landlady
- Manuel Domingos Xavier Francisco Eugénio Pio Teles da Gama (1840-1910): Portuguese soldier
- Francisco Ludovino Homem da Costa Noronha (1860-1908): Portuguese soldier. He was knighted in the Order of Aviz
- Luís Galhardo (1874-1929): Portuguese soldier, journalist, playwright and theatrical entrepreneur
- Fernando José Luís Burnay de Sousa Coutinho (1883-1945): Portuguese nobleman
- Alves da Costa (1896-1971): Portuguese actor and director
- Sarah Affonso (1899-1983): Portuguese artist and illustrator, of Argentinean descent
- Manuel Guedes (1909-1983): Portuguese anti-fascist revolutionary communist politician, leader of the Portuguese Communist Party, political prisoner for 20 years under the Estado Novo regime in Portugal and the Francoist regime in Spain
- Carlos Pinhão (1924-1993): Portuguese journalist and writer
- Ricardo Ferraz (1926-2006): Portuguese boxing and football coach
- Ernesto José Ribeiro (1911-1941): Portuguese bricklayer's assistant who perished in Tarrafal concentration camp due to its opposition to the regime
- Maria Begonha (1989): Portuguese politician
