= Homines =

Homines (meaning "men") may refer to:

- The name Boni Homines or Bonshommes was popularly given to at least three religious institutes in the Catholic Church.
- The Portuguese Boni Homines, or Secular Canons of St. John the Evangelist were a Catholic religious institute.
- Homines Intelligentiae is the name assumed by a heretical sect in the Low Countries, which in 1410-11 was cited before the Inquisition at Brussels.
- Argumenta ad homines consists of replying to an argument or factual claim by attacking or appealing to a characteristic or belief of the source making the argument or claim.

== See also ==
- Hominy
