= Convent of Beato António =

Former convent in Lisbon, Portugal

- Convento do Beato António
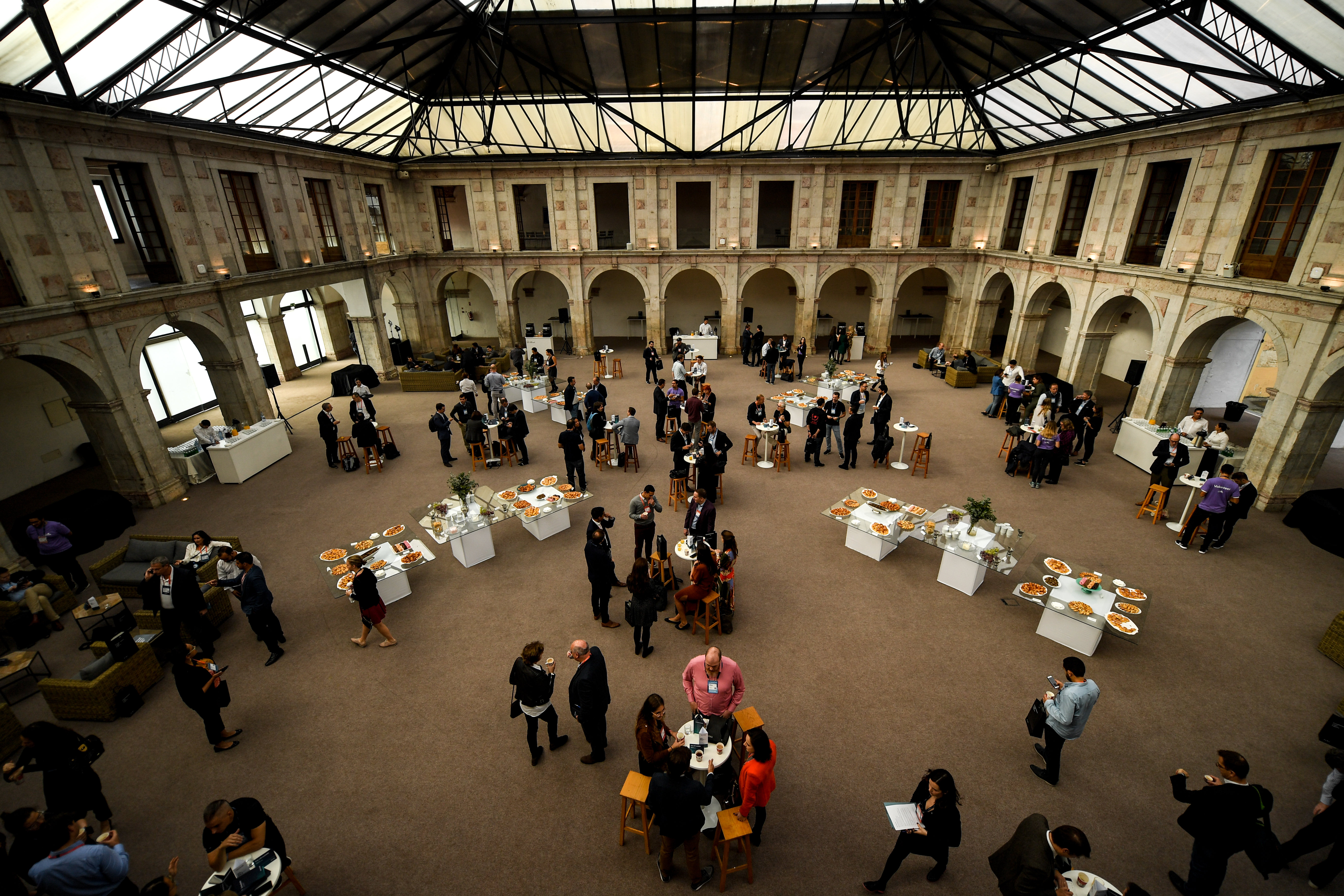
- Interactive map of the Convent of Beato António area

General information
- Type: Convent
- Location: Beato, Lisbon, Portugal
- Coordinates: 38°44′6″N 9°6′21.2″W
- Owner: Portuguese Republic

Technical details
- Material: Mixed masonry

Design and construction
- Architect: Porfírio Pardal Monteiro

The Convent of Beato António (Portuguese: Convento do Beato António) is a former Portuguese convent, located in the civil parish of Beato, in the municipality of Lisbon.

== History ==
A hermitage was constructed on the site in the 15th century, dedicated to São Bento, by order of D. Estêvão de Aguiar, then abbey of Alcobaça.

It was offered to Queen Elizabeth as a wedding gift, destined to the founding of the Congregação de Cónegos de São Salvador (Congregation of the Deacons of São Salvador) of Vilar de Frades. Following the death of the Queen in 1461, King D. Afonso V executed the construction of the convent (honouring her last testament), installing in the place a community of clergy dedicated to Cónegos Regrantes de São João Evangelista (Secular Canons of St. John the Evangelist) from Loio. The Queen had wanted to erect a hospice to shelter the Bons Homens de Vilar, of the Congregation of Lóios from the locale of Xabregas, where there existed a small hermitage dedicated to São Bento, erected by the friars of Alcobaça during the reign of King John I. On 9 March, a papal bull from Pope Pious II authorized the creation of the convent, which was eventually supported financially by Queen Leonor. The convent was recognized, until the end of the 16th century, as the Convent of São Bento de Enxobregas.

Between 1570 and 1602 (the Philippine dynasty), it was inhabited by Father António da Conceição, who was responsible for collecting the necessary financial stipends for the construction of the new church and improve the building. Following legend, the friar was able to construct a sumptuous convent with few monetary resources, which expanded his fame. Later beatified in the 18th century, he was linked to the local toponymy (the site of Beato António or Convent of Beato), giving rise to the name Convento do Beato António (Convent of Blessed António).

In 1633, construction of convent's new chapel was completed.

At the beginning of the 16th century, D. Joana de Noronha, daughter of the second Counts of Linhares ordered the construction of a presbytery for the convent, that was destined as space to house the pantheon of the Linhares countship. This project was terminated in 1622. Through the donations of D. Joana de Noronha she was able to transfer the ossuary of her brother, who had perished in Ceuta on 29 April 1553.

By the mid 17th century, the convent was receiving 2000 cruzados of land rents, supporting a congregation of 37 clerics and 26 servants. Public work on the convent persisted in 1697, resulting in the construction of the cloister and staircase.

Following the 1755 Lisbon earthquake, the building registered some damage, but many of the clergy abandoned the convent, resulting in the many of its treasurers being transferred to other religious buildings, including tombs. The spaces were occupied by a Royal Military Hospital. But, by the end of the century, what little remained in the convent, of an artistic value, was destroyed following a fire that gutted the building.

In 1834, the church was sacked, with many of the religious reliquary removed from the temple, consequently resulting in the transfer of the parish seat from the church to the old Convent of Grilos.

Having withstood the 1755 earthquake, it was destroyed by fire at the end of the 18th century. The kitchen, dining room and the novitiate were the only sections that survived the destruction.

With the extinction of the religious orders in 1834, the church was looted, resulting in the loss of many of carved ornaments, paintings and liturgical vessels. Around this time a fire consumed the old church and part of the convent complex. It was then purchased by industrialist João de Brito, who established a steam-powered milling factory to produce bread and cookies, in addition to a carpentry shop. By 1845, the rest of the convent was occupied by a tobacco factory, and much later, the Companhia Industrial de Portugal e Colónias (Industrial Company of Portugal and the Colonies). By the beginning of the 20th century the church spaces were transformed into silos for cereals.

A project to recuperate the old convent began in 1948, under the direction of Porfírio Pardal Monteiro, that persisted until 1952.

General repairs were performed in 1983, and later in 1990, in context of the Expo 98 Caminhos do Oriente exposition, that included the restoration of the cloister. In November 1998, a risk assessment study was carried out by the DGEMN. A year later it was acquired by the Cerealis group.

On 28 July 2004, a fire destroyed the covering over the staircase and part of the old conventual dependencies.

The new temple of Mannerist and Baroque architecture, was classified as a property of public interest.

On the evening of 28 July 2004 a fire damaged the building, destroying about 70% of the building, including covered staircase and old conventual dependencies. Restoration of the building was completed in May 2005. Since the late twentieth century building has been used for cultural events and social causes. The German band Scorpions had three concerts, based on their 2001 live album (Acoustica) in Convento do Beato.

== Architecture ==
The building comprises a rectangular plan that includes the old church and the primitive conventual dependencies, forming a "U" around the cloister. It includes differentiated wings, covered in tiled roofs.

To the south is the old church, which is preceded by a long courtyard. The three-register, square church facade is marked by a ground floor rounded portico, surmounted by oculus and flanked by rectangular windows. A frieze creates a transition to the second floor, that has five rectangular, symmetrical windows. The final floor, is preceded by cornice, but only includes a central oculus. The interior consists of a single nave, subdivided in height by a 19th-century iron structure, with ten lateral chapels, inscribed transept and deep chancel.

The early monastic complex is marked by its two-floor high cloister and full marble stonework, covered by a metallic structure. In each wing there are seven round arches topped by rectangular bay windows. The refectory includes a rectangular space, covered by a vault in depressed arch. In the lateral wall are six windows, where there are visible traces of the original late 16th-century albarradas-type tile. The staircase leading to the upper floor, flows from an accessible areas by three vaulted arches in two straight sections, that come together at an intermediate level. It is flanked by semi-recessed rails on the walls. In the upper atrium are four doors with protruding pads and marble framing.
