= Igreja de Chelas =

Church in Lisbon, Portugal

Coordinates: 38.7399181°N 9.1176574°W

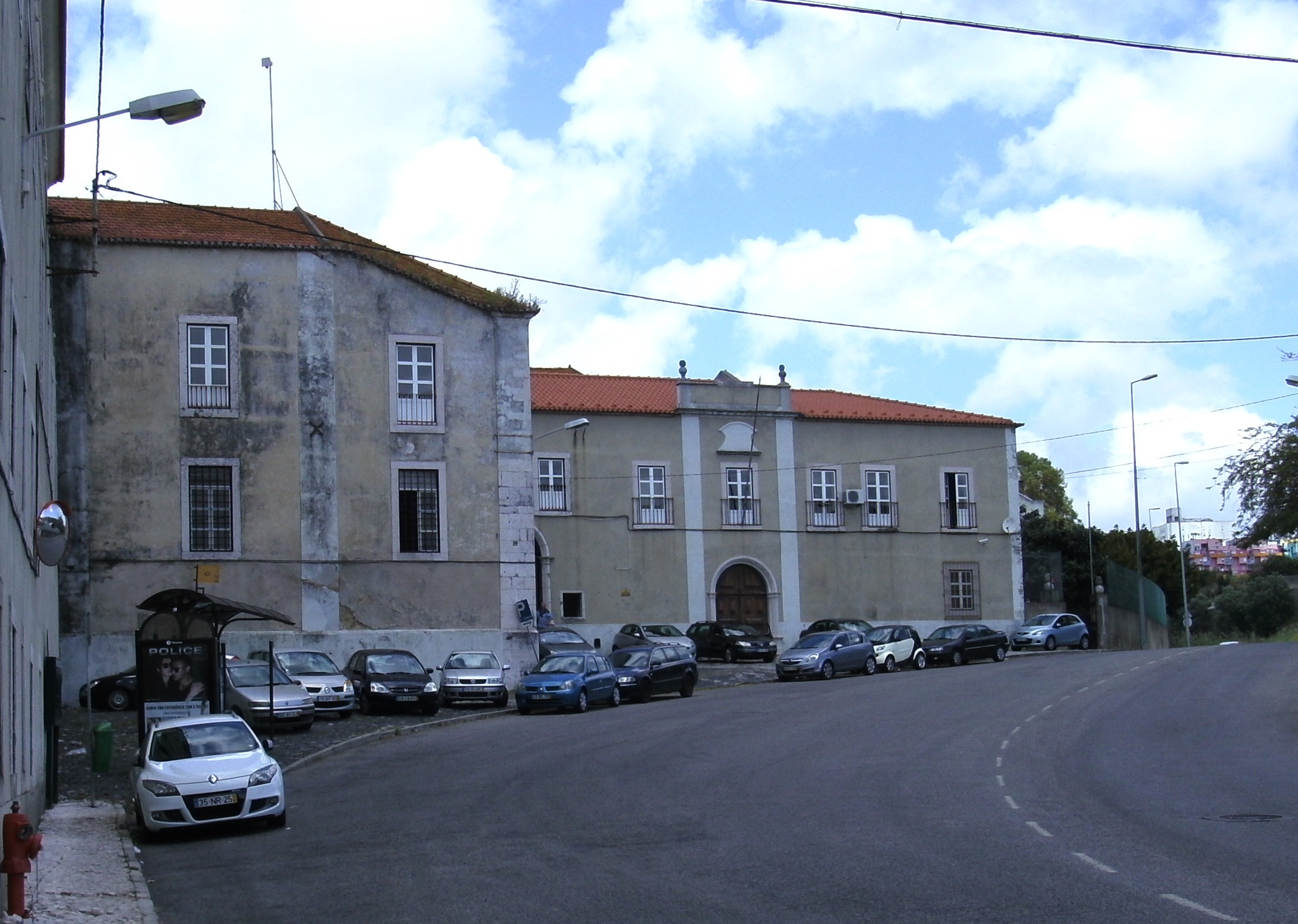
Igreja de Chelas.

Igreja de Chelas is a church in Portugal. It is classified as a National Monument. It was built starting in 1290. It was reconstructed in about 1604, in the Manueline style, and first named to the cultural list in 1910.

== See also ==
- History of Portugal
