= Secular Canons of St. John the Evangelist =

The Portuguese Boni Homines, or Secular Canons of St. John the Evangelist, were a Catholic religious institute. They were founded by John Vicente, afterwards Bishop of Lamego, in the fifteenth century. Living at first independently in a monastery granted to them by the Archbishop of Braga at Villar de Frades. They afterwards embraced the institute of Secular Canons of St. George in Alga (in Venice), and the Portuguese order was confirmed by Pope Martin V under the title of "Boni Homines". They had fourteen houses in Portugal, and King João III gave them charge of all the royal hospitals in the kingdom, while many of the canons went out as missionaries to India and Ethiopia. Several members of the order won a high reputation as scholars and theologians.
