= Panaca =

Panaca may refer to:

In the United States

- Panaca, Nevada, an unincorporated town in Lincoln County
  - Panaca Summit Archeological District, near the above community
- Panaca Formation, a geologic formation in Nevada

Elsewhere

- PANACA, or (Spanish: Parque Nacional De La Cultura Agropecuaria), a Colombian theme park
- Panaca Palace, a palatial residence in the Portuguese capital of Lisbon
- Panaca or panaka, in Inca culture, a family formed by all the descendants of a monarch
