= São Vicente, Lisbon =

São Vicente
- Civil parish
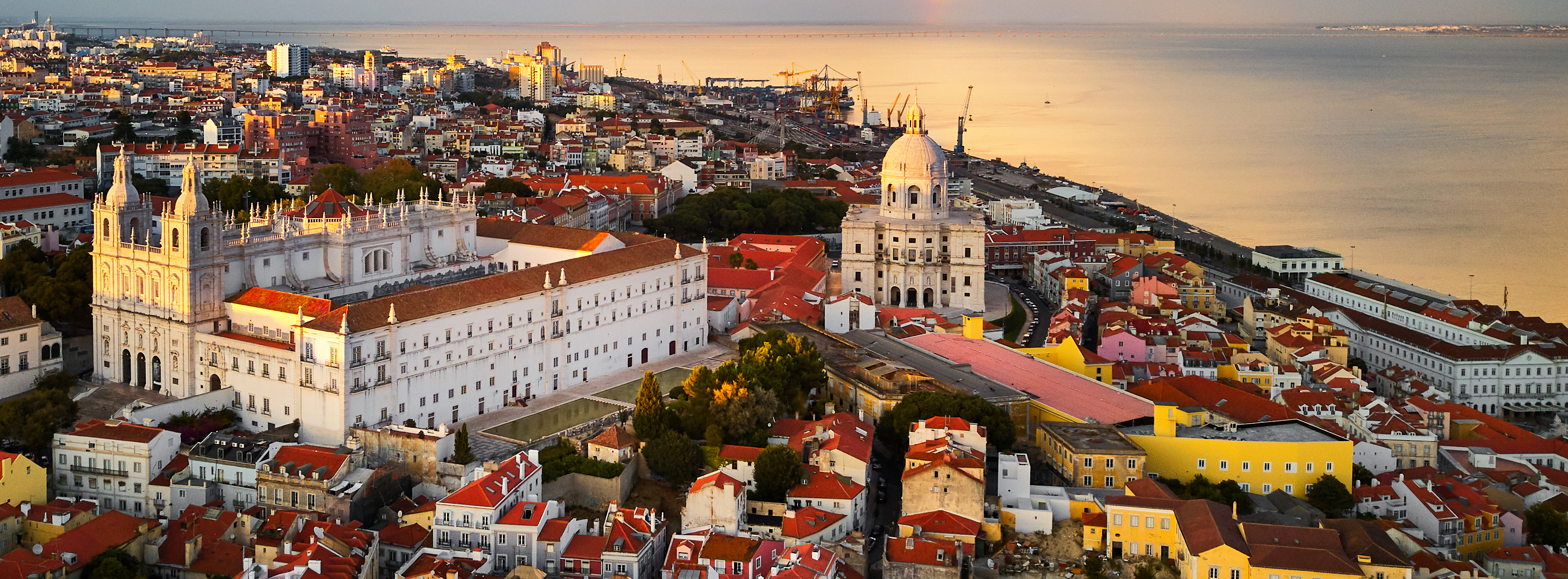
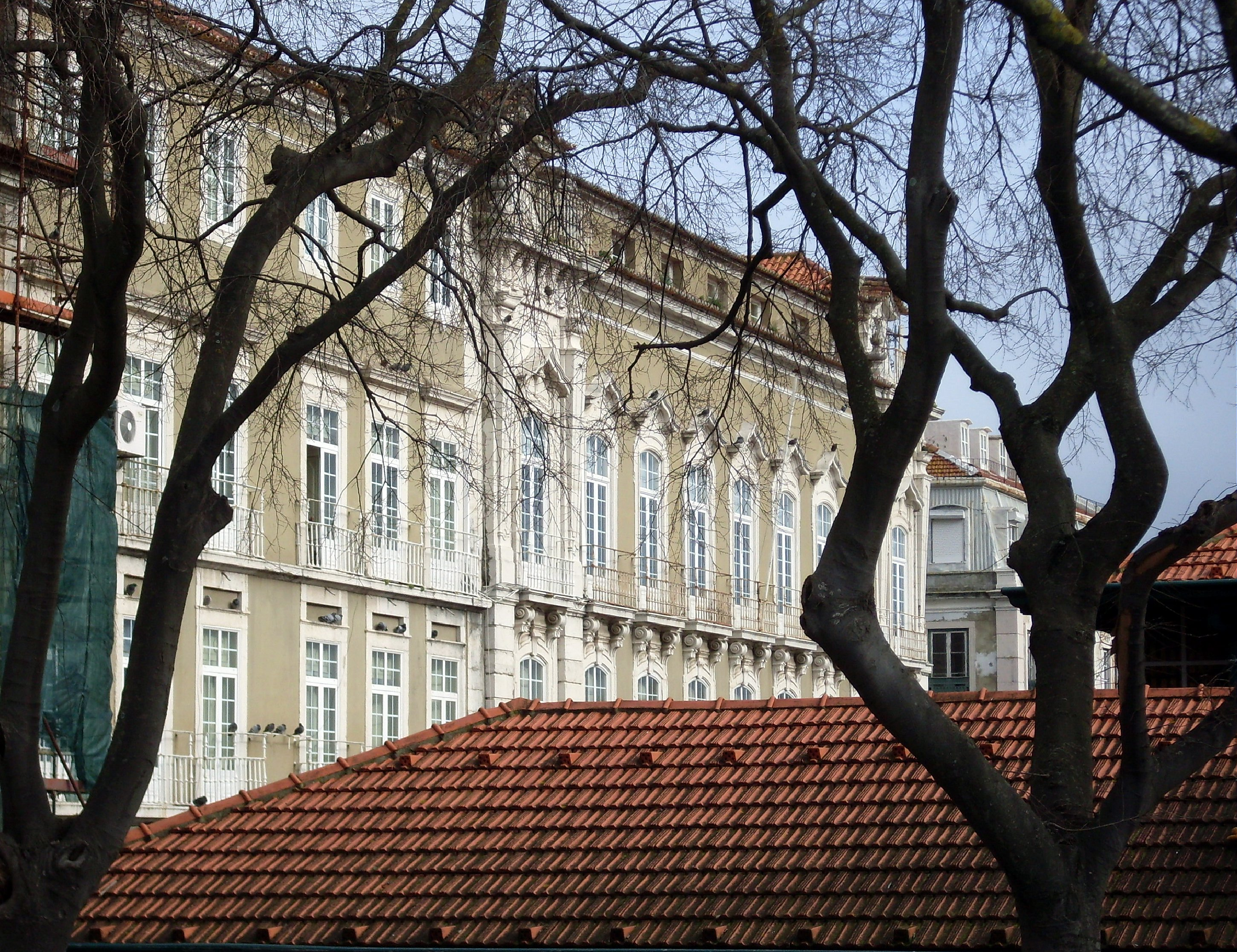
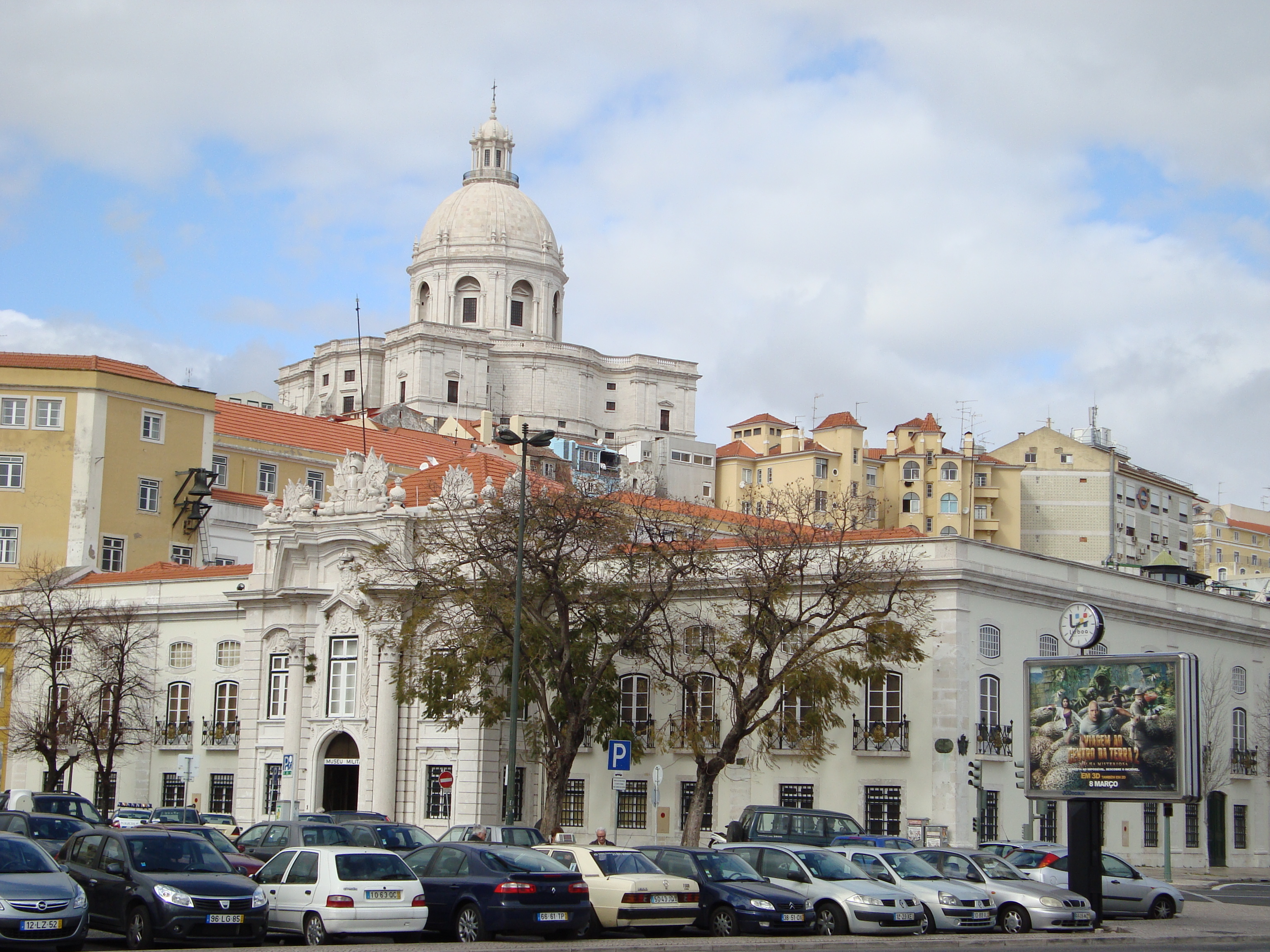
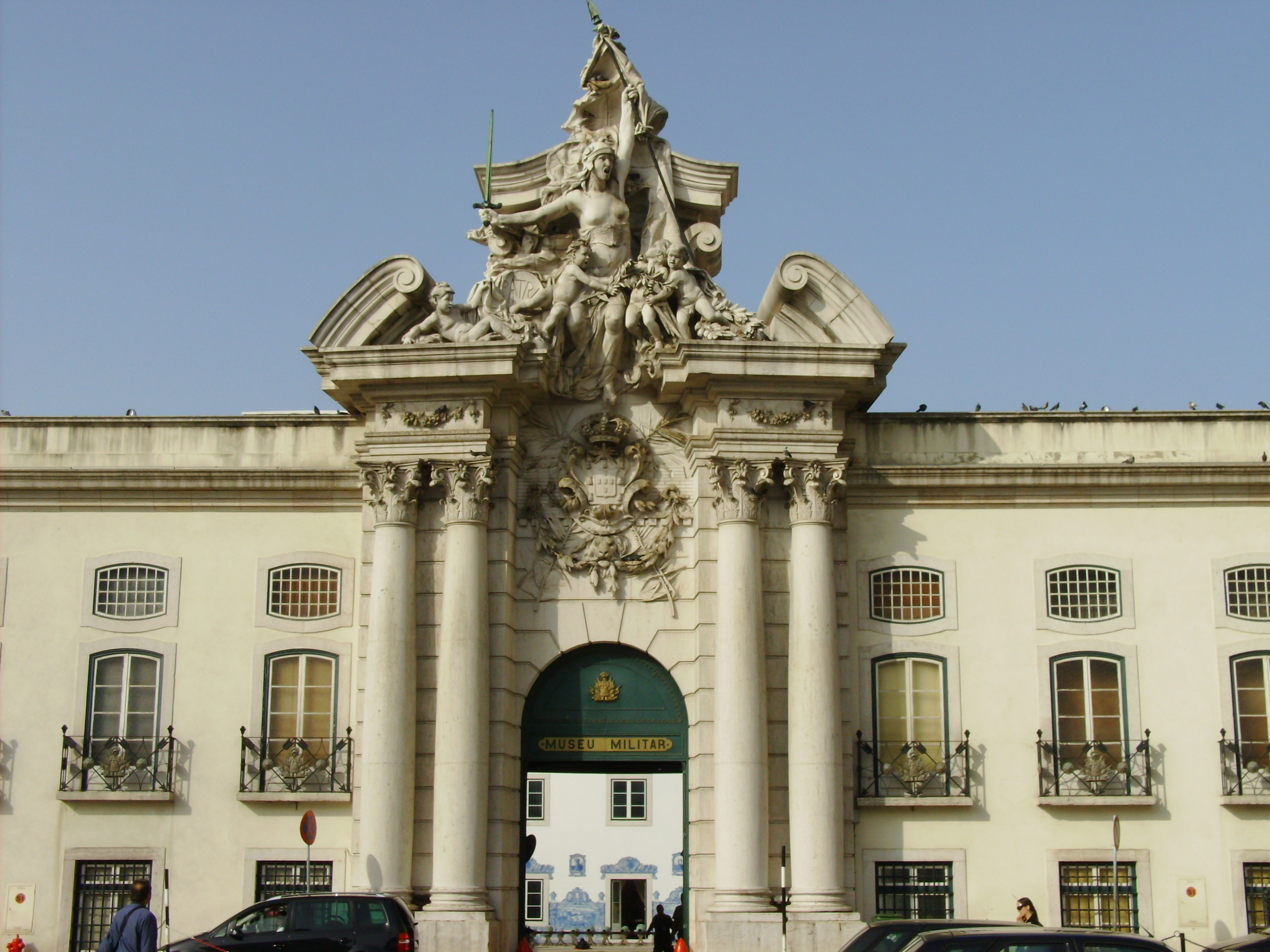
- Clockwise: View of São Vicente de Fora Monastery and the National Pantheon of Santa Engrácia in the Alfama neighborhood; Graça Convent; Military Museum of Lisbon; view of Alfama; Barbacena Palace.

- Coordinates: 38.719°N 9.126°W
- Country: Portugal
- Region: Lisbon
- Metropolitan area: Lisbon
- District: Lisbon
- Municipality: Lisbon

Area
  - Total: 1.99 km^{2} (0.77 sq mi)

Population (2021)
  - Total: 13,956
  - Density: 7,010/km^{2} (18,200/sq mi)
- Time zone: UTC+00:00 (WET)
  - Summer (DST): UTC+01:00 (WEST)

São Vicente (Portuguese pronunciation: [sɐ̃w viˈsẽtɨ]) is a freguesia (civil parish) and district of Lisbon, the capital of Portugal. Located in the historic center of Lisbon, São Vicente is to the east of Santa Maria Maior, south of Arroios, and west of Penha de França. São Vicente is home to numerous historic neighborhoods, including Alfama. The population in 2021 was 13,956, for a population density of 7,013.1 inhabitants per km^{2} on an area of 1.99 square kilometers

== History ==
The parish of Graça was created in 1569, after the Santo Estêvao de Alfama de-annexation. The parish name was intended to honor the catholic martyr Santa Engracia of Zaragoza, later on the King Manuel I daughter, Infanta Maria built a church in the parish to receive a reliquary of the said martyr. After being almost destroyed by a severe storm, the church was rebuilt and eventually received the National Pantheon classification.

For reasons unrelated to its founding, namely the residence of Baron Monte Pedral, the parish's name was changed to Monte Pedral on May 1, 1913, only to revert to its original designation on March 24, 1952.

This new parish was created on November 8, 2012 in application of a resolution of the Assembly of the Republic of Portugal (2012 Administrative Reform of Lisbon), merging the former parishes of São Vicente de Fora, Graça (English: Grace) and Santa Engrácia. The new administrative configuration was implemented after the local elections of 2013.

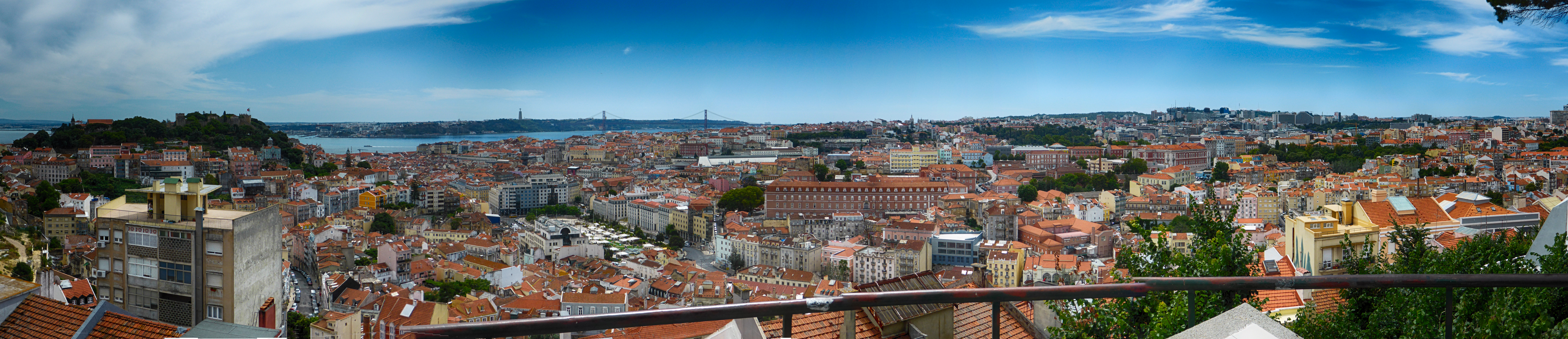
View from Miradouro da Senhora do Monte

== Demographics ==
=== Historical resident population (before the 2012 Administrative Reform) ===
Starting from the early 2000s, another factor that has greatly contributed to the depopulation of the parish has been gentrification caused by mass tourism. In São Vicente around 1,750 apartments are listed as "Alojamento Local", meaning they have the license to be rent on platforms such as Booking.com or Airbnb. Moreover, many hotels and other activities catering to tourists have pushed many inhabitants towards other neighbourhoods. According to Ricardo Gonçalves Dias, that the neighborhood is "out of character, as it has lost part of its popular culture" and "The neighborhood and mutual help network that existed has also been lost a little". From 2001 to 2011 the population decreased by further 2,512 people, or by 14.7%.

São Vicente de Fora

Historical population
| Year | Pop. | ±% |
|---|---|---|
| 1960 | 11,533 | — |
| 1970 | 9,253 | −19.8% |
| 1981 | 8,301 | −10.3% |
| 1991 | 5,453 | −34.3% |
| 2001 | 4,267 | −21.7% |
| 2011 | 3,539 | −17.1% |
Source: INE

Graça

Historical population
| Year | Pop. | ±% |
|---|---|---|
| 1960 | 15,122 | — |
| 1970 | 13,183 | −12.8% |
| 1981 | 11,442 | −13.2% |
| 1991 | 8,604 | −24.8% |
| 2001 | 6,960 | −19.1% |
| 2011 | 5,787 | −16.9% |
Source: INE

Santa Engrácia

Historical population
| Year | Pop. | ±% |
|---|---|---|
| 1960 | 11,748 | — |
| 1970 | 10,245 | −12.8% |
| 1981 | 9,705 | −5.3% |
| 1991 | 7,626 | −21.4% |
| 2001 | 5,860 | −23.2% |
| 2011 | 5,249 | −10.4% |
Source: INE

=== Current resident population (after the 2012 Administrative Reform) ===
In the 2021 Portuguese Census was recorded an additional demographic loss for the new parish of São Vicente. In particular, from 2011 to 2021 the parish lost 1,383 people, recording a loss of -9.02%.

| Former Parishes | | | Current Parish | | | |
| Parish | Population (2011) | Area (km^{2}) | Parish | Population in 2011 (adjusted) | Population in 2021 | Area (km^{2}) |
|---|---|---|---|---|---|---|
| São Vicente de Fora | 3,239 | 0.32 | São Vicente | 15,339 | 13,956 | 1.99 |
| Graça | 5,787 | 0.35 | São Vicente | 15,339 | 13,956 | 1.99 |
| Santa Engrácia | 5,249 | 0.55 | São Vicente | 15,339 | 13,956 | 1.99 |

== Landmarks ==
- Augusto Gil Garden
- Bairro Estrela d'Ouro
- Building at Rua da Senhora do Monte, nº46: Honorable Mention of the Valmor and Municipal Architecture Prize
- Calçada da Graça
- Feira da Ladra
- Graça Convent (Convento da Graça)
- Largo da Graça
- Miradouro da Senhora do Monte
- Miradouro Sophia de Mello Breyner Andresen
- Monastery of the Mónicas, also known as Convento das Mónicas
- Museu da Água, in Rua do Alviela, n.º 12 (Barbadinhos Steam Pumping Station)
- National Pantheon of Santa Engrácia
- Nossa Senhora da Porciúncula Church (Igreja de Nossa Senhora da Porciúncula, also called Barbadinhos Church)
- Chapel of Our Lady of Monte, Lisbon
- Pátio dos Quintalinhos or Villa Rocha (former "Escolas Gerais")
- Palácio dos Condes de Figueira
- Palha Palace (also called Van Zeller Palace or Pancas Palace)
- Santa Apolónia Station
- São Vicente de Fora Monastery and church
- Veloso Rebelo Palhares Palace
- Vila Berta
- Voz do Operário building
