= Santa Engrácia, Lisbon =

Coordinates: 38°43′09″N 9°07′11″W

Church of Santa Engrácia

Santa Engrácia (English: Saint Engratia) is a former parish (freguesia) in the municipality of Lisbon, Portugal. At the administrative reorganization of Lisbon on 8 December 2012 it became part of the parish São Vicente. It has a total area of 0.57 km^{2} and total population of 5,860 inhabitants (2001); density: 10,335.1 inhabitants/km^{2}.

The parish was created in 1959, after the Santo Estêvao de Alfama de-annexation. The parish name was intended to honor the catholic martyr Santa Engracia of Zaragoza, later on the King Manuel I daughter, Infanta Maria built a church in the parish to receive a reliquary of the said martyr. After being almost destroyed by a severe storm, the church was rebuilt and eventually received the National Pantheon classification.

== Main sites ==
- Palha Palace (also called Van Zeller Palace or Pancas Palace)
- Veloso Rebelo Palhares Palace
- Nossa Senhora da Porciúncula Church (also called Barbadinhos Church)
- Santa Apolónia Station
