= Graça, Lisbon =

Graça
- Civil parish
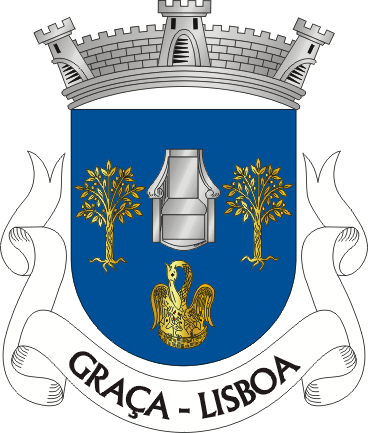
- Coat of arms

- Location in Portugal
- Coordinates: 38.43°N 9.07°W
- Country: Portugal
- Region: Lisbon
- Metropolitan area: Lisbon
- District: Lisbon
- Municipality: Lisbon
- Disbanded: 2012

Area
  - Total: 0.34 km^{2} (0.13 sq mi)

Population (2001)
  - Total: 6,960
  - Density: 20,000/km^{2} (53,000/sq mi)
- Time zone: UTC+00:00 (WET)
  - Summer (DST): UTC+01:00 (WEST)
- Website: http://www.jf-graça.pt/

Graça (English: Grace) is a former parish (freguesia) in the municipality of Lisbon, Portugal. At the administrative reorganization of Lisbon on 8 December 2012 it became part of the parish São Vicente.

== Main sites ==
- Nossa Senhora do Monte Chapel
- Convento das Mónicas
- Convento da Graça
