= Estrela d'Ouro =

Estrela d'Ouro (English: Gold Star) is a Lisbon workers' village located in the parish of São Vicente, between number 22 on Rua da Graça and number 14 on Rua da Senhora do Monte.

== History ==
The enclave was designed to house workers by the architect Manuel Joaquim Norte Júnior in 1907 and commissioned by Agapito Serra Fernandes, a confectionery industrialist of Galician origin. Construction was completed in 1909. Villa Rosalina, the former owner's house, with a private chapel, lake and garden, is located in the center of the enclave. The other buildings are located at its northern end. They generally each have a ground and first floor with an external balcony and access staircase in a U shape plan around private streets named after relatives of the owner. In total, the neighborhood has 120 small apartments.

The old Royal Cine on Rua da Graça (a local supermarket since the 1980s), was also part of the development, though built later in 1928.

== Oddities ==
The star related to the neighborhood's name is a recurring motif, reproduced in the stones of the sidewalks, in the wrought iron of the galleries or in the tile panels at the entrance and inside the neighborhood. In the old Royal Cine, the star motif is visible on the exterior façade and above the clock face in the interior foyer.

The streets in the neighborhood are named after relatives of Agapito Serra Fernandes: Josefa Maria, Virgínia and Rosalina.

The first sound film in Portugal was shown at the Royal Cine on 5 April 1930 (White Shadows in the South Seas). Prior to this, the Royal Cine was a powerhouse and car barn for one of Lisbon's pre-electrification cable cars.

=== Gallery ===
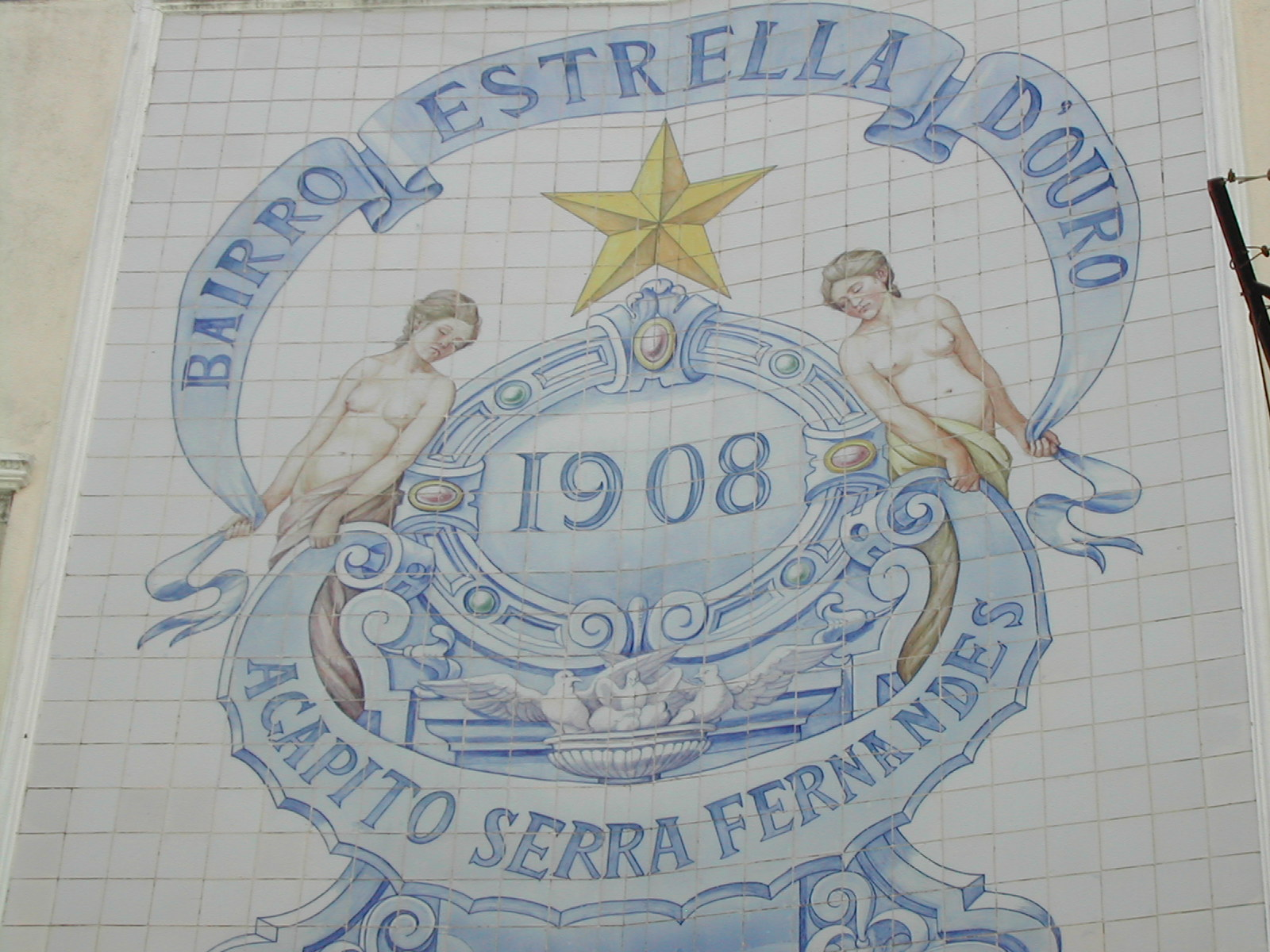
Star in mosaic panel.

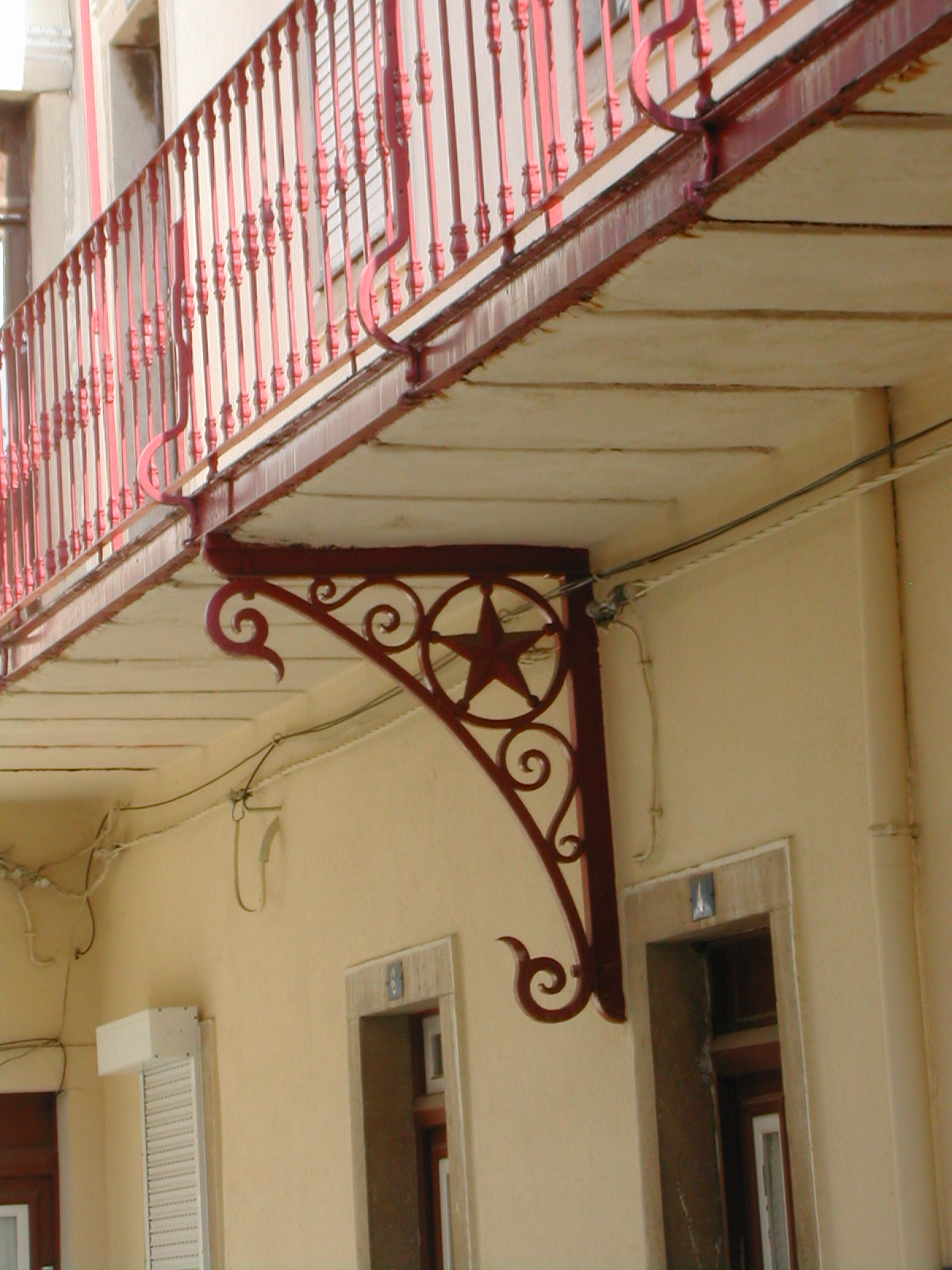
Star in ironwork.

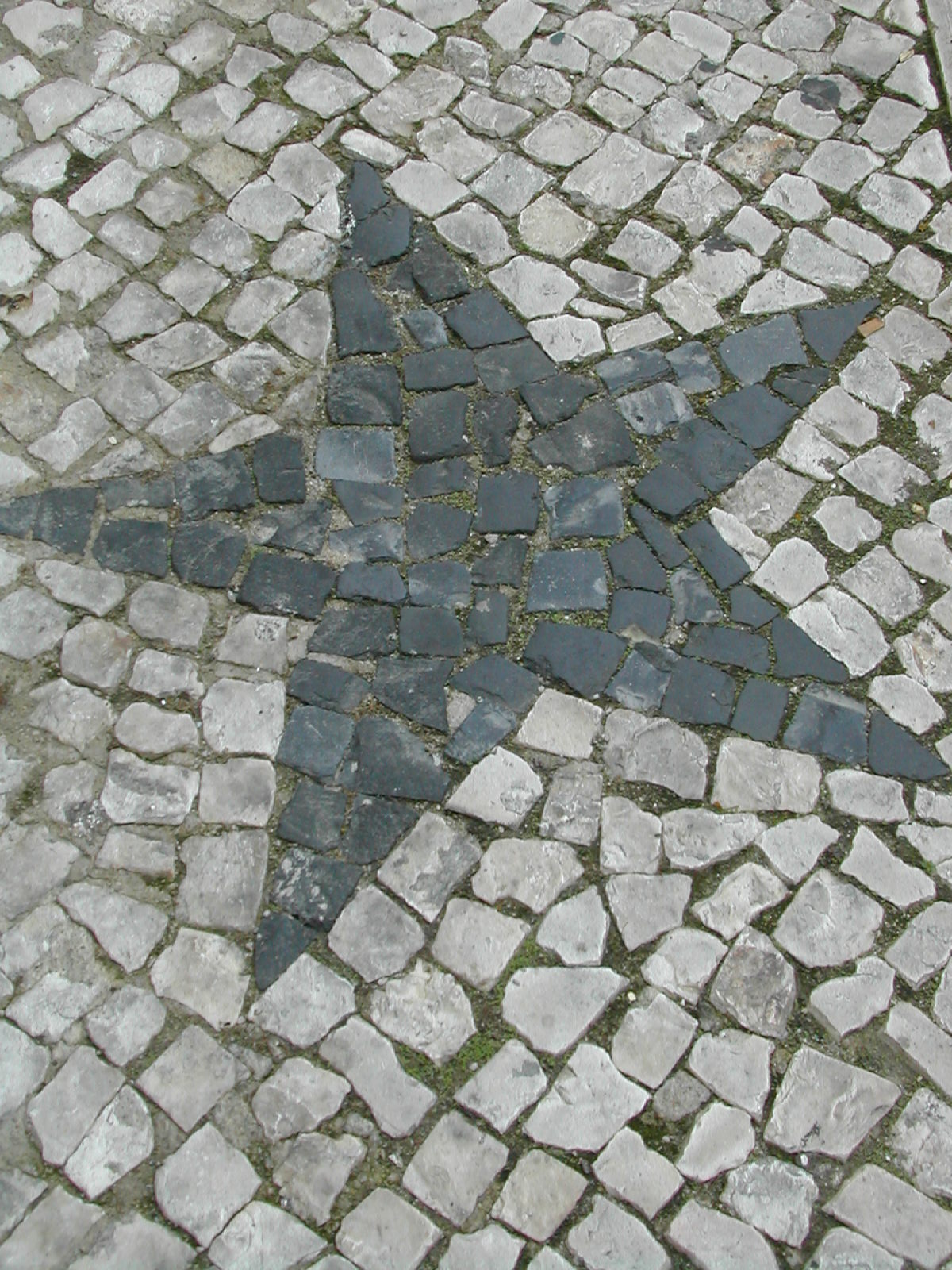
Star in sidewalk calçada.

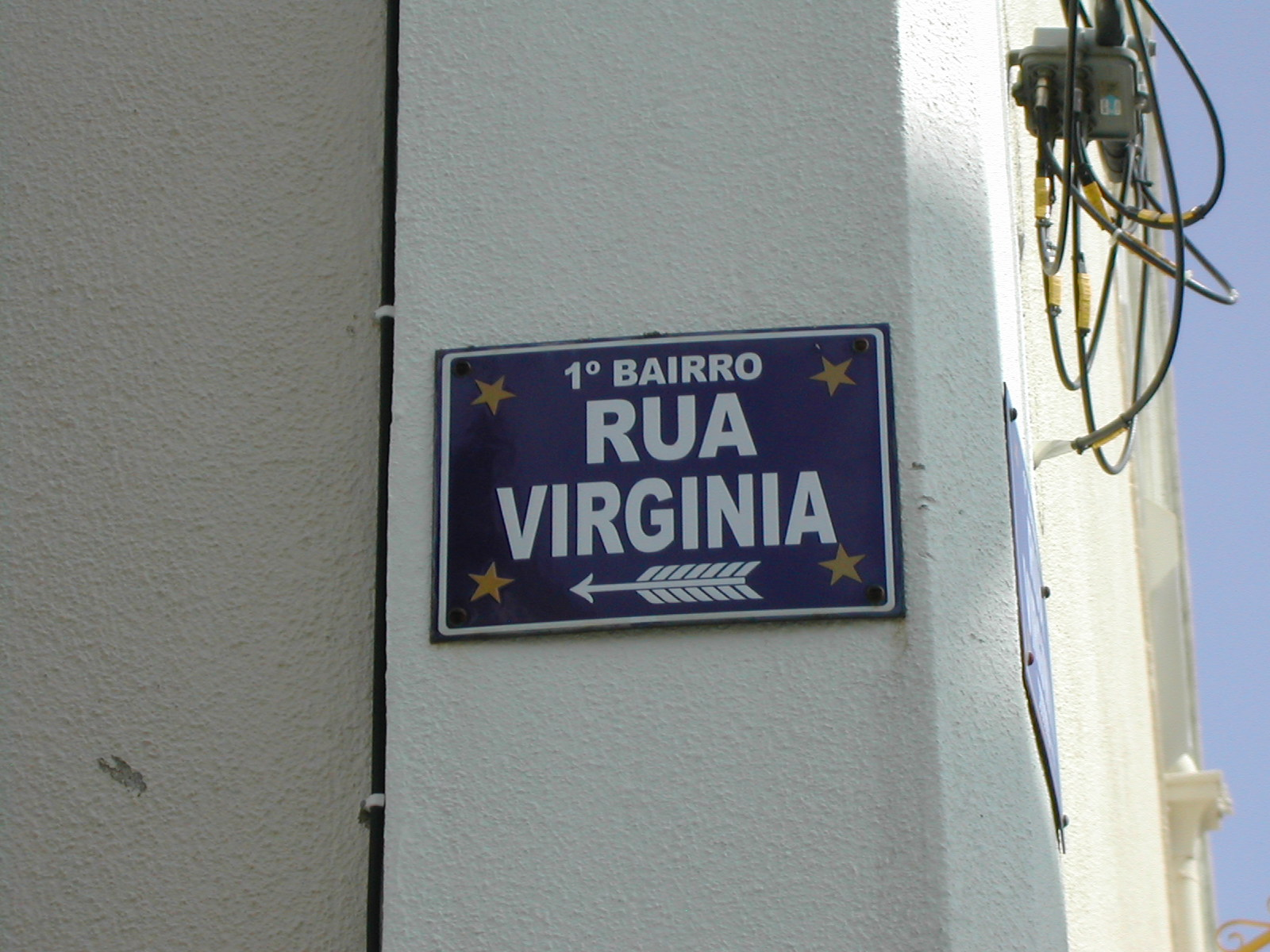
Star on street sign.

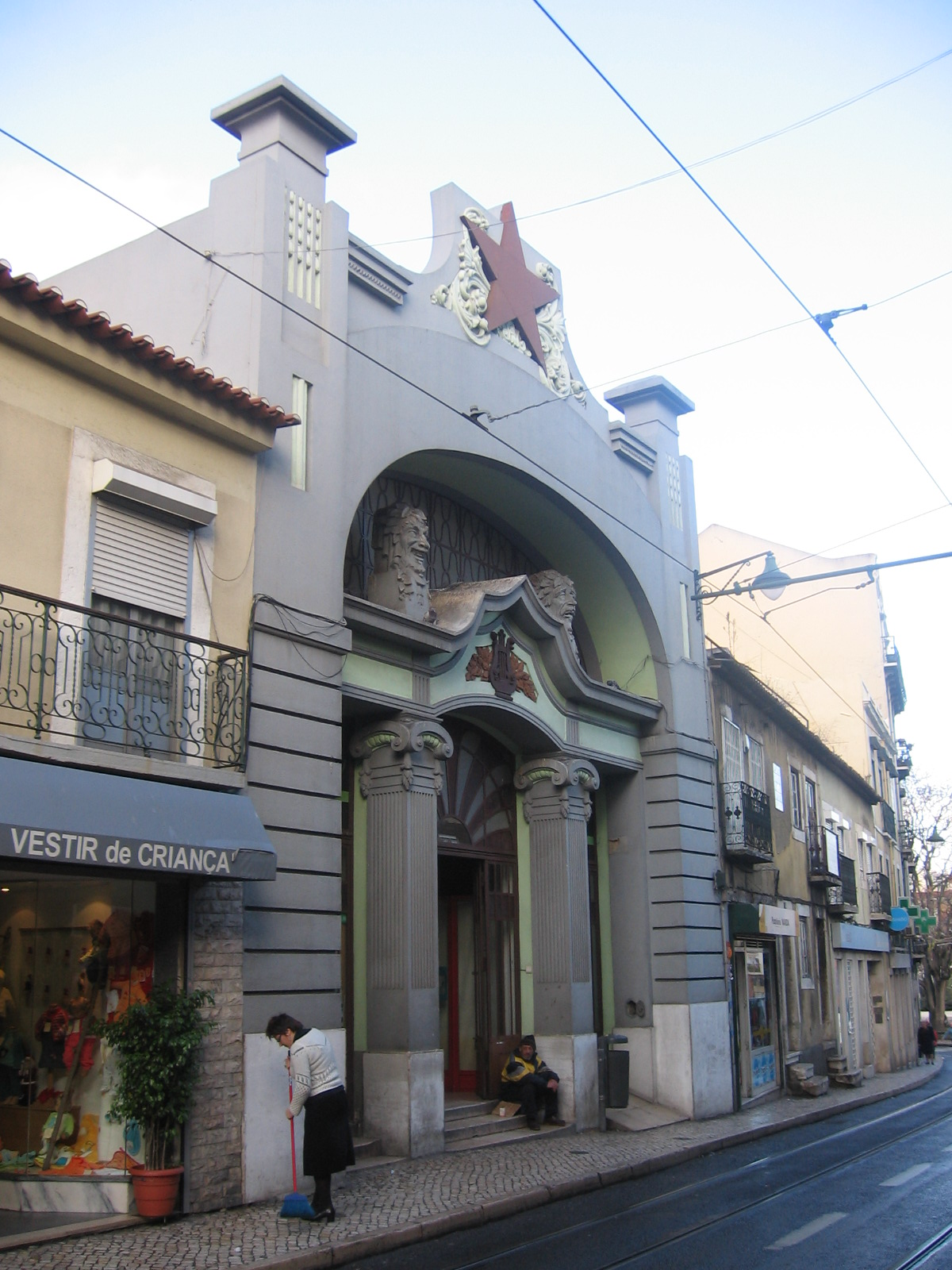
Star on Royal Cine façade.
