= Manuel Joaquim Norte Júnior =

Portuguese architect

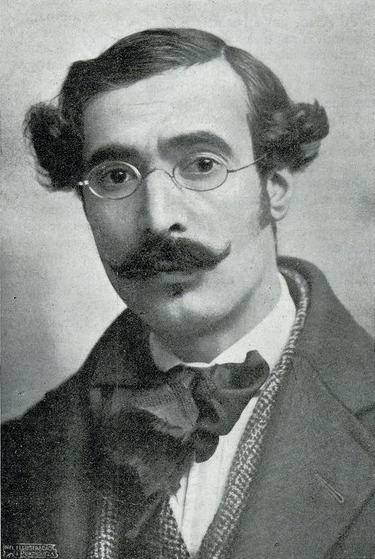
- Norte Júnior, circa 1911
- Born: December 24, 1878; Lisbon, Portugal
- Died: December 11, 1962 (aged 83); Sintra, Portugal
- Education: Ecole des Beaux-Arts, Paris (atélier Pascal)
- Occupation: Architect
- Buildings: Palacete Belmarço; Casa Malhoa; Edifício Abel Pereira da Fonseca; Edifício da Sociedade Amor da Pátria

Manuel Joaquim Norte Júnior (Santa Engrácia, Lisbon, 24 December 1878 – Santa Maria, Sintra, 11 December 1962) was a Portuguese architect, based primarily in Lisbon. He was one of the most important practitioners of Arte Nova, the Portuguese strand of Art Nouveau at the dawn of the twentieth century and one of the early representatives of Portuguese modern architecture.

== Early Life, Family, and Training ==
Norte Júnior was the son of laborer Manuel Joaquim and Maria Joaquina, both natives of Faro (the parish of Estoi).

In 1891 Norte Júnior entered the preparatory course at the Escola de Belas Artes (School of Fine Arts) in Lisbon. In 1900, he completed the course in civil architecture that he had started while at the Escola and won a competition for a state-funded overseas scholarship. This enabled him to study briefly at the prestigious Ecole des Beaux-Arts in Paris from July to October 1903, specifically in the atélier of Jean-Louis Pascal, one of the school's most famous and preferred studio instructors, who would serve as official architect for the Bibliothèque Nationale.

On 24 June 1903 he married Mariana Rodrigues Godinho (born ca. 1888 in the Coração de Jesus parish, Lisbon) at the Church of Santa Engrácia in Lisbon. She was a domestic maid and daughter of Teodolinda Amélia Rodrigues, a native of the parish and municipality of Aldeia Galega do Ribatejo (now known as Montijo). The architect Rosendo Carvalheira served as a witness at the wedding.

As his circa-1911 photograph attests, like many other Art Nouveau architects, he sported a handlebar mustache.

== Independent Practice ==
Upon his return to Lisbon from Paris, Norte Júnior found immediate success. He completed his first commission, the Casa-Atelier Malhoa, for an artist on the Avenida 5 de Outubro, which won the municipal competition called the Premia Valhor for 1905 and marked the beginnings of his contribution to the fashionable Avenidas Novas district of Lisbon north of the Baixa, where most of his best-known works are located. Despite the fact that his studio was located on the Praça Ilha do Faial in Lisbon, Norte Júnior chose to live in Sintra, one of the most exclusive and tony villages outside the capital, at the end of one of its suburban rail lines, where many wealthy Portuguese industrialists had built their own villas. There he also was involved in the construction or remodeling of some seventy buildings.

Norte Júnior was a near-contemporary of other prominent Portuguese architects, such as Miguel Nogueira Júnior (1883–1953), Álvaro Machado (1874–1944) and Miguel Ventura Terra (1866–1919). They followed a previous generation of nineteenth-century designers that included José Luís Monteiro (1848–1942) and Nicola Bigaglia (1841–1908). Norte Júnior probably inadvertently benefited from the premature death of Terra, as more commissions fell to him instead, particularly for residences and hotels, but also the interiors of many retail establishments. His completed small-scale commercial projects are distinguished by the historicist and eclectic elements of their façades, which are punctuated by hints of Art Nouveau (Arte Nova in Portugal); A good example is the Versailles pastry shop at 15, Avenida da República. Another, in Chiado, closer to the city center, is the façade of the restaurant A Brasileira, where the horseshoe-shaped entrance is flanked by statues and adorned with sculpted garlands. A third can be found in the façade of the Joalheria do Carmo, where Corinthian columns are paired with an imposing coat of arms that contains a Portuguese shield over a cross, set within a heart crowned with castles and trimmed by laurel branches in gold.

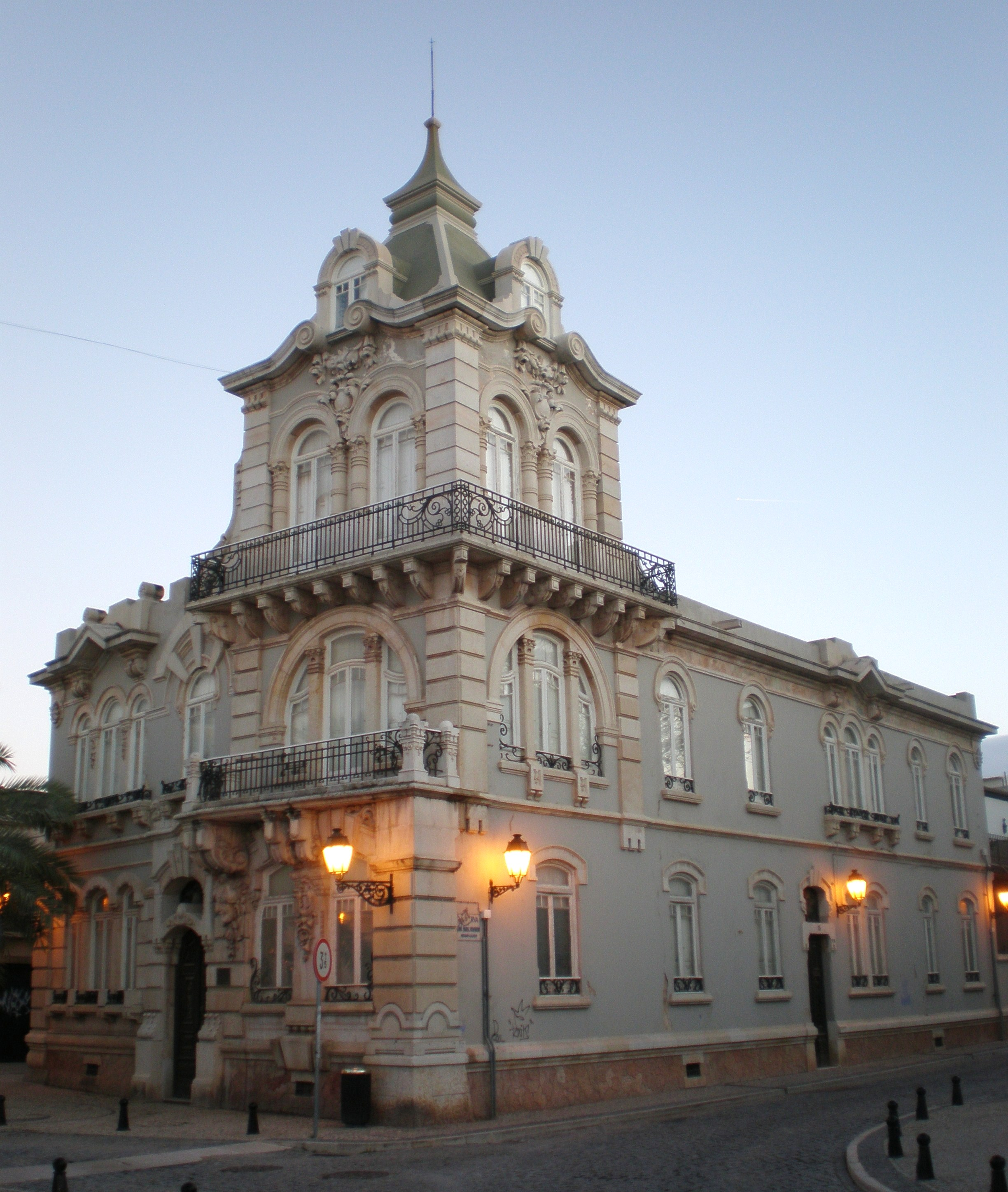
The Palaco Belmarço in Faro, designed by Norte Júnior and built in 1917.

Some authors have speculated that Norte Júnior's devotion to republican ideals was pivotal to bringing him commissions. However, he cultivated clients from a wide range of socioeconomic backgrounds and positions. A Freemason, Norte Júnior benefited from his position as the technical coordinator for two different construction companies involved in city modernization plans: the first was the Companhia de Construção Predial, which was backed by the Fonseca, Santos e Viana bank, but failed due to undercapitalization. The other, Crédito Edificadora, underwrote Norte Júnior's design for the villa on the corner of Avenida da República and Avenida de Berna, designed for Amélia Pereira Leite. The corner site made it ideal for the final design that placed a prominent domed tower at the juncture of the two streets, crowning a three-story mansion considered by many to be the most ostentatious in the neighborhood. The eclectic decor inside and out in stone and stucco draws from both the classicism of the Beaux-Arts, which Norte Júnior would have digested while in Paris, as well as Arte Nova. The added elements of stained glass and paintings have drawn comparison with the British Arts and Crafts movement.

The house for Pereira Liete was one of several mansions that Norte Júnior constructed for wealthy Lisbon industrialists. A good example is the Villa Sousa, at Alameda das Linhas de Torres 22, in Lisbon, which was integrated into a large garden surrounded by a wall with decorative railings. It was awarded the Valmor Prize in 1912, the second of five times that Norte Júnior would win the municipal architectural competition. The jury admired it for the harmony of its proportions and elegance of its turret, the sculptural work of the stonework, as well as the frequent use of the round arch and small columns. Modified several times over the years, however, it fell into disrepair and much of it was later demolished, leaving only the façade and some walls today.

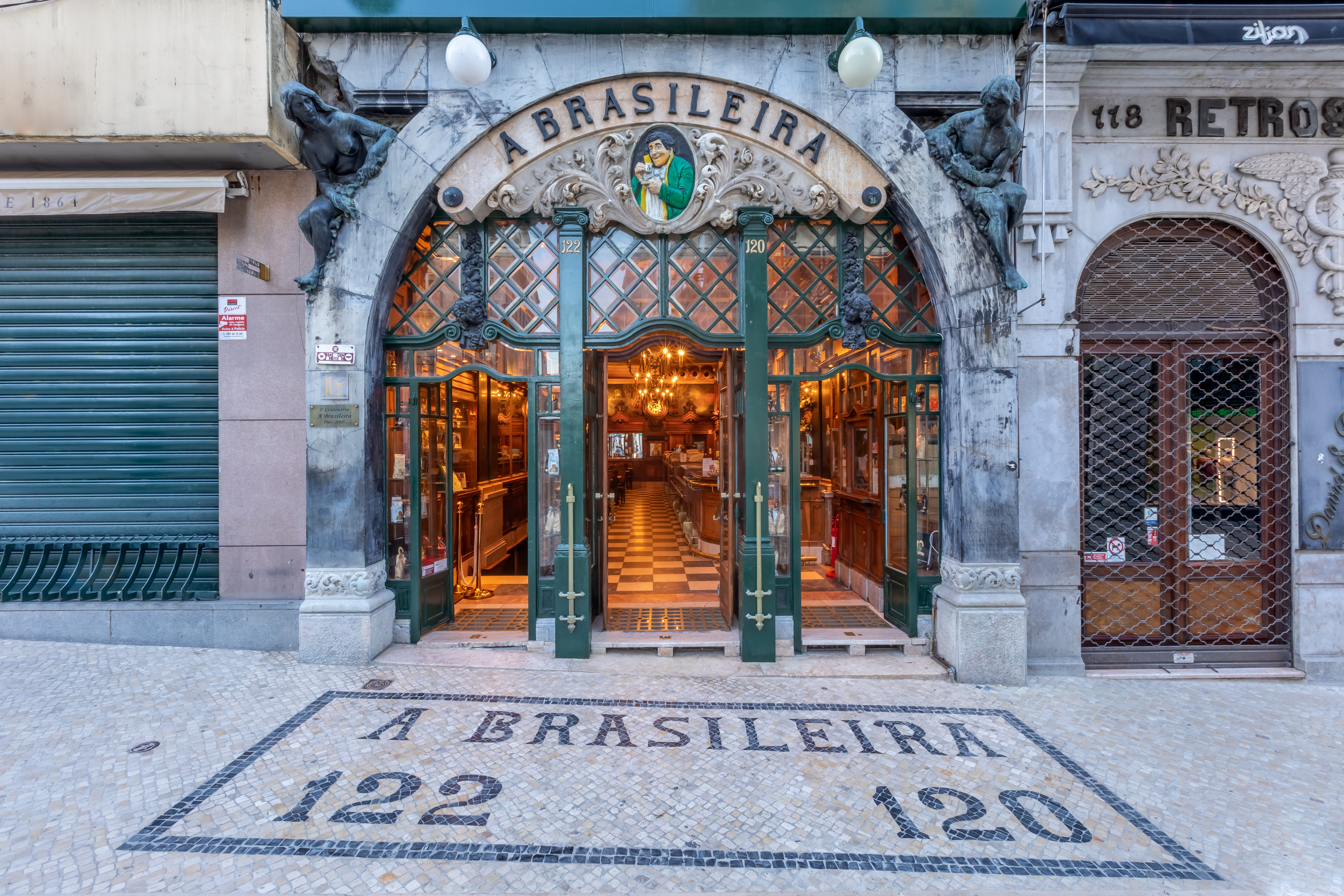
Restaurant A Brasiliera do Chiado in Lisbon, designed by Norte Júnior, 1923.

Norte Júnior's association with prominent industrialists also extended to their paternalistic endeavors on behalf of their employees. In 1908, for example, the grocer Agapito da Serra Fernandes commissioned him to design housing for his workers in the Estrela d'Ouro development in the Graça district of Lisbon. Norte Júnior designed the complex of 120 units, each house having a ground and first floor with an external balcony and access staircase. The units are arranged in a U-shaped plan around private streets named after relatives of the owner. At the center of the complex Serra Fernandes also constructed his own residence, known as the Rosalina villa, with a private chapel, lake, and garden. The development is now a listed historic monument. Norte Júnior also worked with mutual aid and patriotic organizations, such as the Sociedade de Instrução e Beneficência A Voz do Operário (Society for Instruction and Welfare The Voice of the Worker), one of the major organizations of the Portuguese labor movement. Established in 1879, it founded a newspaper and a school, simply called the Voz do Operário, in the Graça neighborhood northeast of the center of Lisbon; Norte Júnior designed the complex, an Arte Nova building which opened in 1912 and still functions as such today under the same name.

== Later Career ==
Norte Júnior continued to practice well into the 1930s and 1940s, with many of his last Lisbon apartment buildings dating from when he was nearly 70 years old. His work, like many contemporaneous Portuguese architects of midcentury, became subject to the corporatist aesthetic preferred by the Estado Novo, with austere, reserved façades and streamlined, rounded corners, drastically different from his earlier eclectic and Arte Nova work. One exception, fittingly located outside of mainland Portugal, is the Art Deco headquarters of the Sociedade Amor da Pátria in Horta, in the Azores (1934), an organization dedicated to philanthrophy, charity, and recreation. It contains a large theater and other facilities used to host dramatic performances, concerts, dances, congresses, dinners, and other assemblies.

He died on 11 December 1962 in the parish of Santa Maria in Sintra.

== List of Selected Works ==
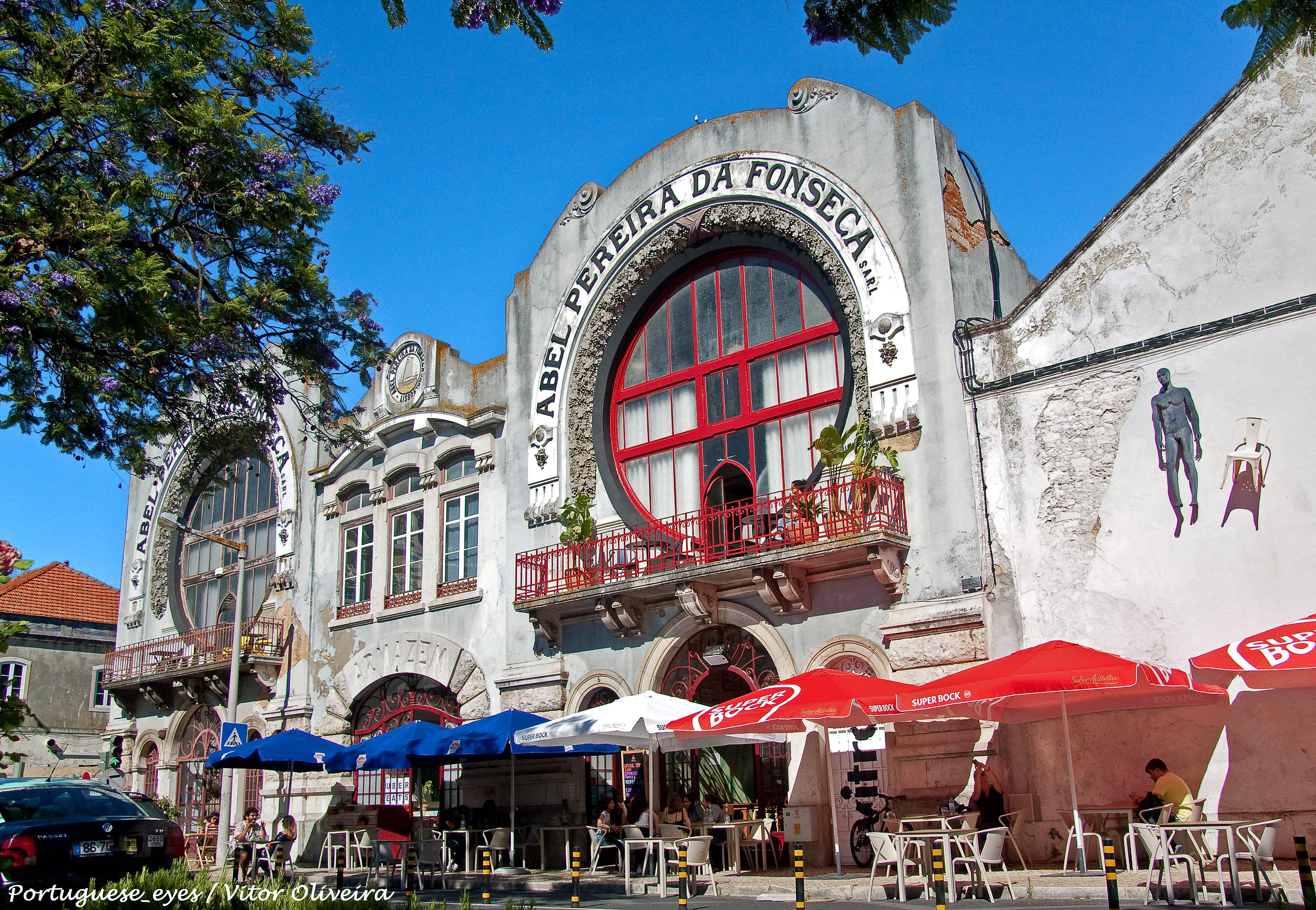
Former wine storage warehouse of Abel Pereira da Fonseca, Marvilha, Lisbon, designed by Norte Júnior and built in 1917.

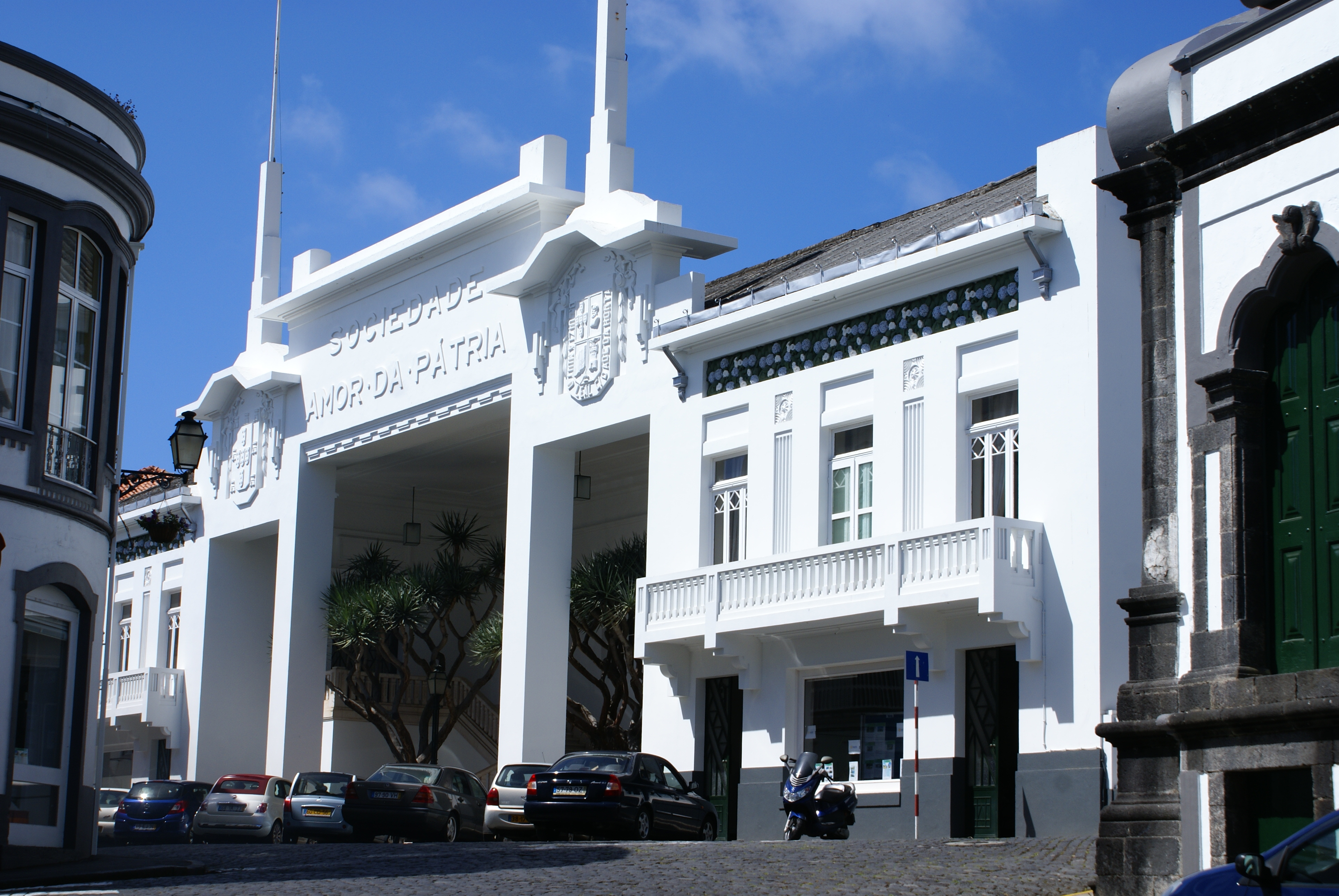
The headquarters of the Sociedade Amor da Pátria in Horta, designed by Norte Júnior and built in 1934.

- Casa Malhoa, Lisbon, 1904–05. Valmor Prize of 1905.
- Avenida da República 36, Lisbon, 1908. Honorable Mention, Valmor Prize of 1908.
- Villa Sousa, Alameda das Linhas de Torres 22, Lisbon, 1912. Valmor Prize of 1912.
- Praça Duque de Saldanha, 12, Lisbon, 1912. Honorable Mention of the Valmor Prize of 1912.
- Belmarço Mansion, Faro, 1912 or 1917.
- Fontes Pereira de Melo, 28-28A, Lisbon, 1914. Valmor Prize of 1914.
- Stables of Santos Jorge, Estoril, 1914.
- Avenida da Liberdade 206–218, Lisbon, 1915. Valmor Prize of 1915.
- Fialho Palace, Faro, 1915—25.
- Abel Pereira da Fonseca Building, Lisbon, 1917.
- Casino of Sintra, 1923.
- A Brasileira do Chiado, Lisbon, 1923.
- Portuguese Real Estate Credit Building, Lisbon, 1925.
- Carmo Jewelry Store, Lisbon, 1925.
- Palace Hotel da Curia, Curia, 1926.
- Pensão Tivoli, Lisbon, 1927. Valmor Prize of 1927.
- Former António Arroio School, Lisbon, 1928.
- Café Nicola, Lisbon, 1929.
- Building of the Amor da Pátria Society, Horta (Azores), 1934.
- Palacete Guerreirinho, Faro, 1936.
- Avenida Barbosa du Bocage 109, circa 1935.
- Avenida Almirante Reis 229, Lisbon, 1941.
- Alameda Dom Afonso Henriques 82, Lisbon, 1946.
- Rua de Dona Estefânia 193, Lisbon, circa 1945.
- Avenida Praia da Vitória 6, circa 1945.
- Variety Theatre, Lisbon.
- Royal Cinema, Lisbon.
