= Igreja do Menino Deus =

Catholic church and national monument in Portugal

Coordinates: 38.7136°N 9.1314°W

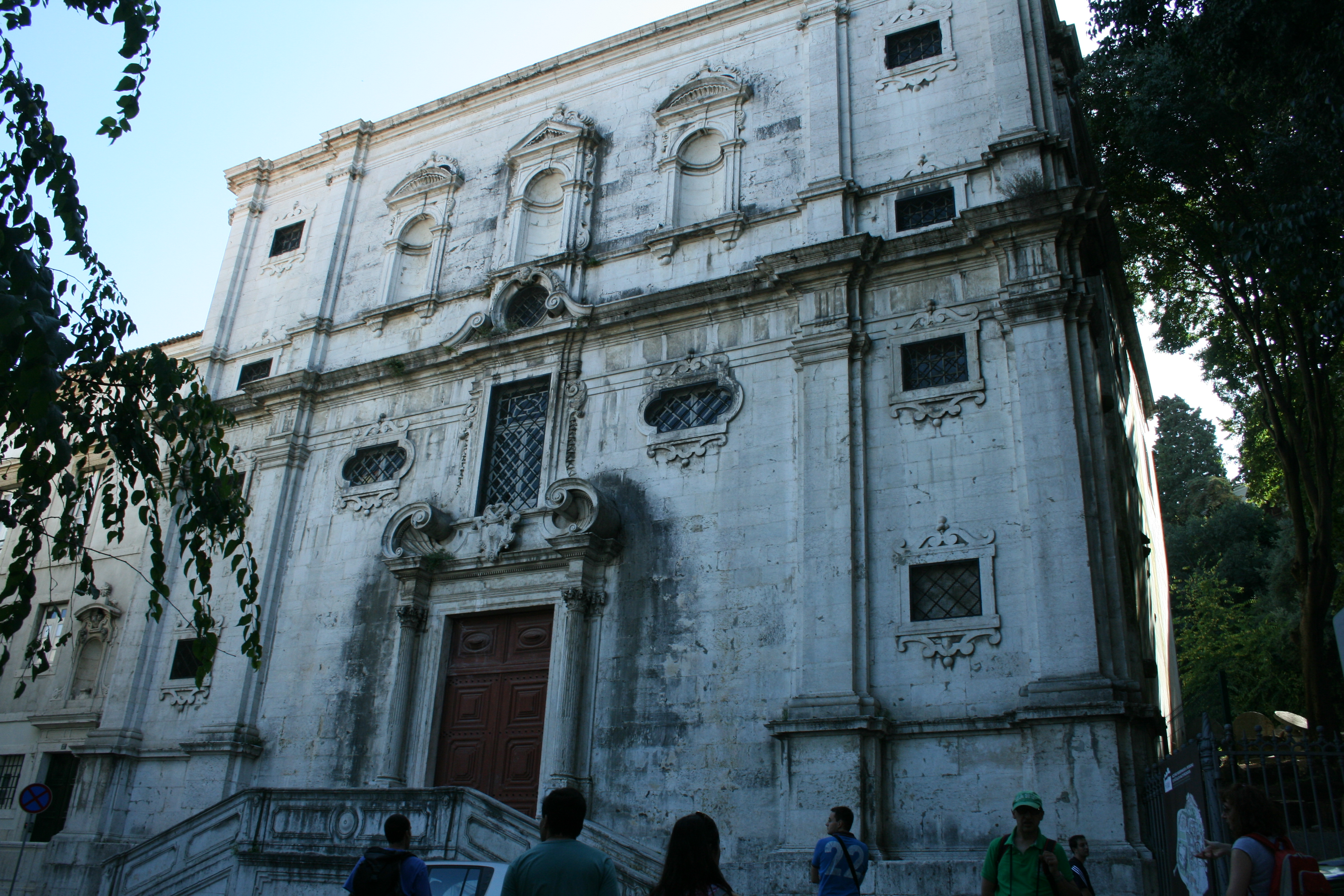
- View of the main façade of the church.

Religion
- Affiliation: Catholic Church
- Diocese: Lisbon District
- Region: Lisboa Region
- Rite: Roman Rite

Location
- Location: Calçada do Menino de Deus 27, 1100 Lisboa, Portugal.
- Municipality: Lisbon
- Interactive map of Igreja do Menino Deus

Architecture
- Style: Baroque
- Groundbreaking: 1711

Igreja do Menino Deus is a church in Portugal. It is classified as a National Monument. It was designed by the architect João Antunes.

== See also ==
- Catholicism in Portugal
