= Dona Branca =

Portuguese fraudster (1902–1992)

- Born: Maria Branca dos Santos; 1902; Lisbon, Portugal
- Died: 1992 (aged 89–90)
- Other name: Dona Branca
- Motive: Fraud, Forgery
- Penalty: 10 years in jail

Maria Branca dos Santos, more commonly referred to as "Dona" Branca (1902–1992), was a Portuguese criminal known chiefly for maintaining a Ponzi scheme in Portugal between 1970 and 1984 that paid a ten percent monthly interest. During this time she became popularly known as "The people's banker".

Dona Branca was arrested in 1984, and in 1988 she was sentenced to 10 years in prison. She was one of the last inmates of Convento das Mónicas when it was dismantled in 1989.

In 1993 RTP created a telenovela titled A Banqueira do Povo ("The People's Banker") based on these events with Eunice Muñoz playing the role of the title character, in this case Dona Benta.
