= Feira da Ladra =

Flea market in Lisbon, Portugal

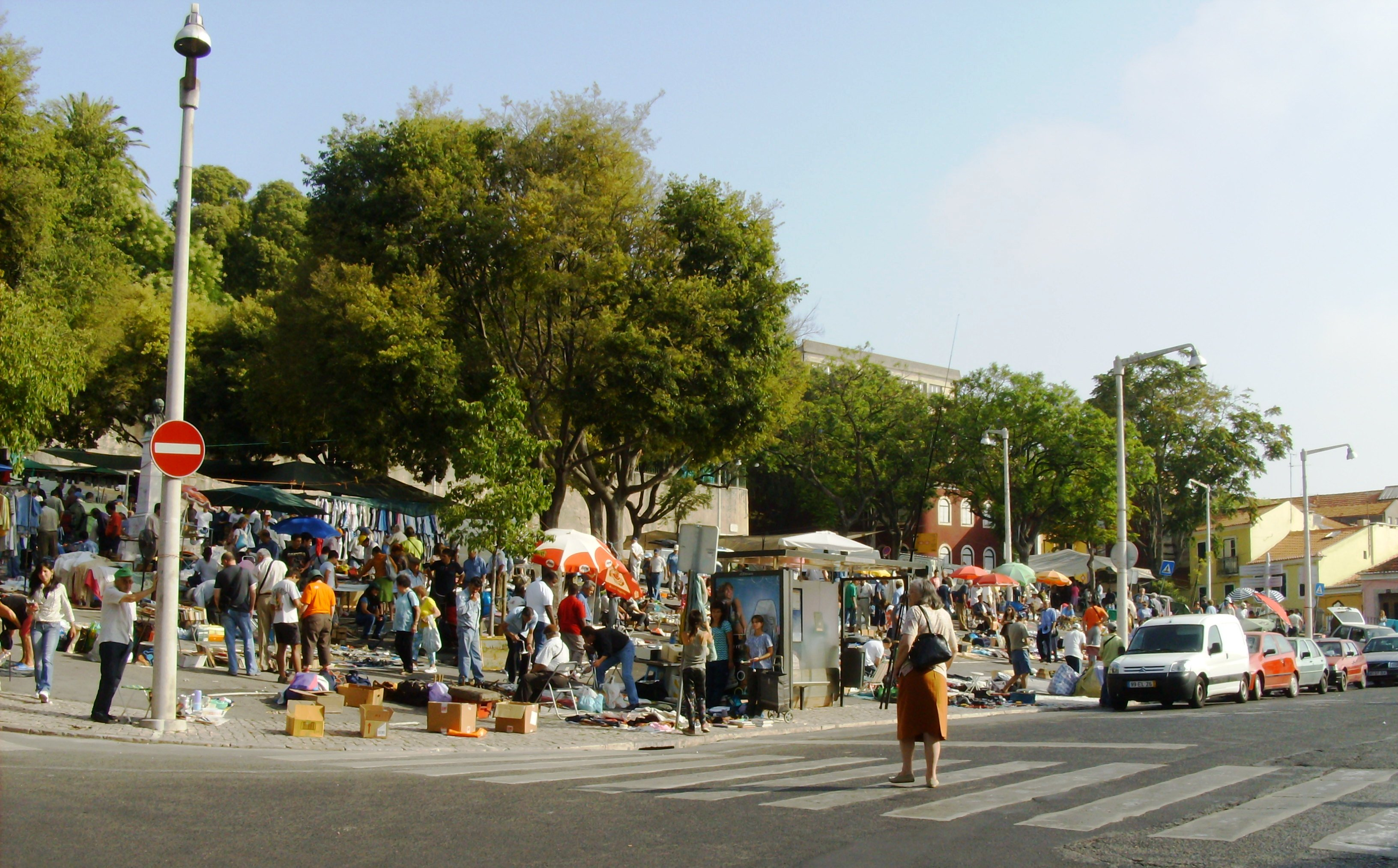
The Flea Market as it appears currently

The Feira da Ladra is a flea market in the city of Lisbon, Portugal.

With roots dating back to the 13th century, the fair has moved from place to place over the centuries, until it settled in Campo de Santa Clara, parish of São Vicente, where it now takes place. It is dedicated, above all, to the trade of antiques, second-hand objects and crafts.

The fair takes place weekly on Tuesdays and Saturdays, from 9 am until 6 pm.

It is one of Lisbons three flea markets, along with the newer Feira do Relógio and Feira das Galinheiras.

== History ==
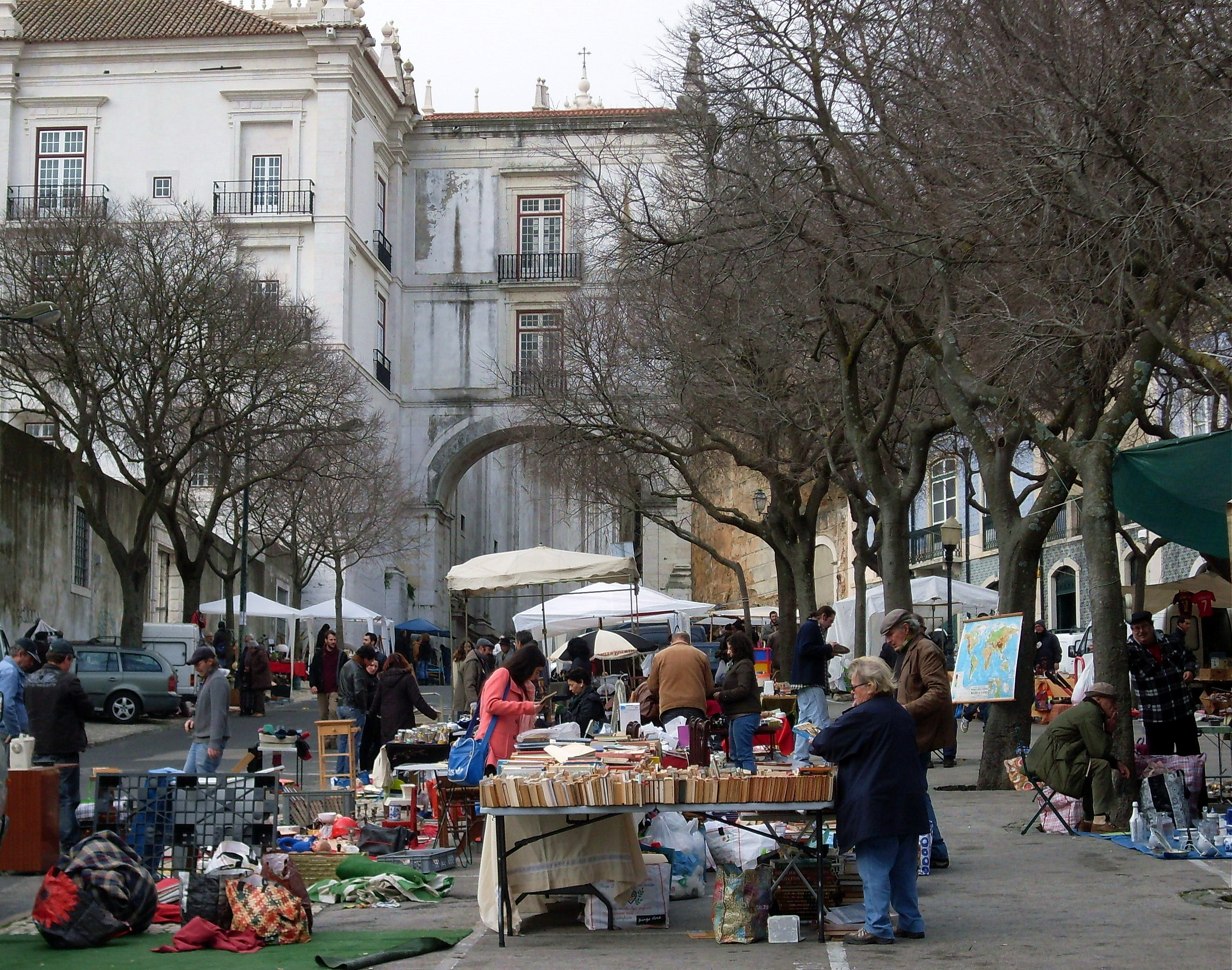
The Flea Market

Originally known as the Mercado Franco de Lisboa (Lisbon free market) the fair first took place in 1272 just below São Jorge Castle gate at the Rua do Chão da Feira. It is the oldest known fair to have continuously taken place in Lisbon. The fair was later moved to Rossio, being first attested there in 1552. Its current name was first attested in an official document dating to 1610.

After the earthquake of 1755, it was installed in Praça da Alegria, extending right along to Avenida da Liberdade.

It was transferred to Campo dos Mártires da Pátria square in 1823, but returned to Praça da Alegria five months later.

In 1835 it was again set in Campo dos Mártires da Pátria, where it remained until 1882, before finally moving to Campo de Santa Clara where it is now. Originally taking place only on Tuesdays, it has taken place on Saturdays as well since 1903.
