= João Antunes =

Portuguese architect and master mason

- Born: 1642; Braga, Portugal
- Died: 1712 (aged 69–70); Lisbon, Portugal
- Occupations: Architect, stonemason

João Antunes (1642–1712) was a Portuguese architect and master mason, considered to be one of the most important architects of Baroque architecture. Antunes served as royal architect during the reign of King Pedro II of Portugal and is responsible for a number of famous landmarks in Lisbon, such as the National Pantheon at Santa Engrácia, and the tomb of Saint Joana, Princess of Portugal.

== Biography ==
João Antunes was born in Braga, in the province of Minho, and, presumably, received some sort of education while restoring the Ribeira Palace during the Philippine Dynasty. Antunes was appointed royal architect (arquitecto Real) in 1699. His main work is the Church of Santa Engrácia (started 1682) in Lisbon, a Greek cross building with curved façades typical of the Baroque architecture of Borromini. Antunes was also responsible for the projects for the Church of Saint Elói (built after 1694, destroyed in the 1755 Lisbon earthquake) and the Church of Menino Deus (1711–1737), both in Lisbon. These churches had the shape of a rectangle with angled edges, thus assuming the shape of an irregular octagon. This floorplan scheme, possibly derived from designs by Guarino Guarini, would greatly influence other churches in Portugal and colonial Brazil. All of these churches were decorated with marble panels of Italian influence, anticipating the dominant role that Roman art would have in the Portuguese court during the 18th century.

Antunes was also responsible for the Church of Bom Jesus of Barcelos, started in 1704. The innovative floorplan of this church consists of a Greek cross church (an influence of Santa Engrácia) inserted into a hexagon with four sides of round shape. Another work by Antunes in northern Portugal was the renovation of the sacristy of Braga Cathedral.

João Antunes also designed several Baroque altarpieces for the private chapels of the nobility and churches like the Santo Antão Church in Lisbon and the Chapel of Saint Vincent in Lisbon Cathedral (the latter was lost in the 1755 earthquake).

Another notable work is the large tomb constructed for Princess Joana in the Convent of Jesus in Aveiro. The tomb consists of a large central chest with cherubs supporting the royal arms at the top. All of these works were made of polychromed marble of Italian influence.

== Gallery ==
National Pantheon at Santa Engrácia

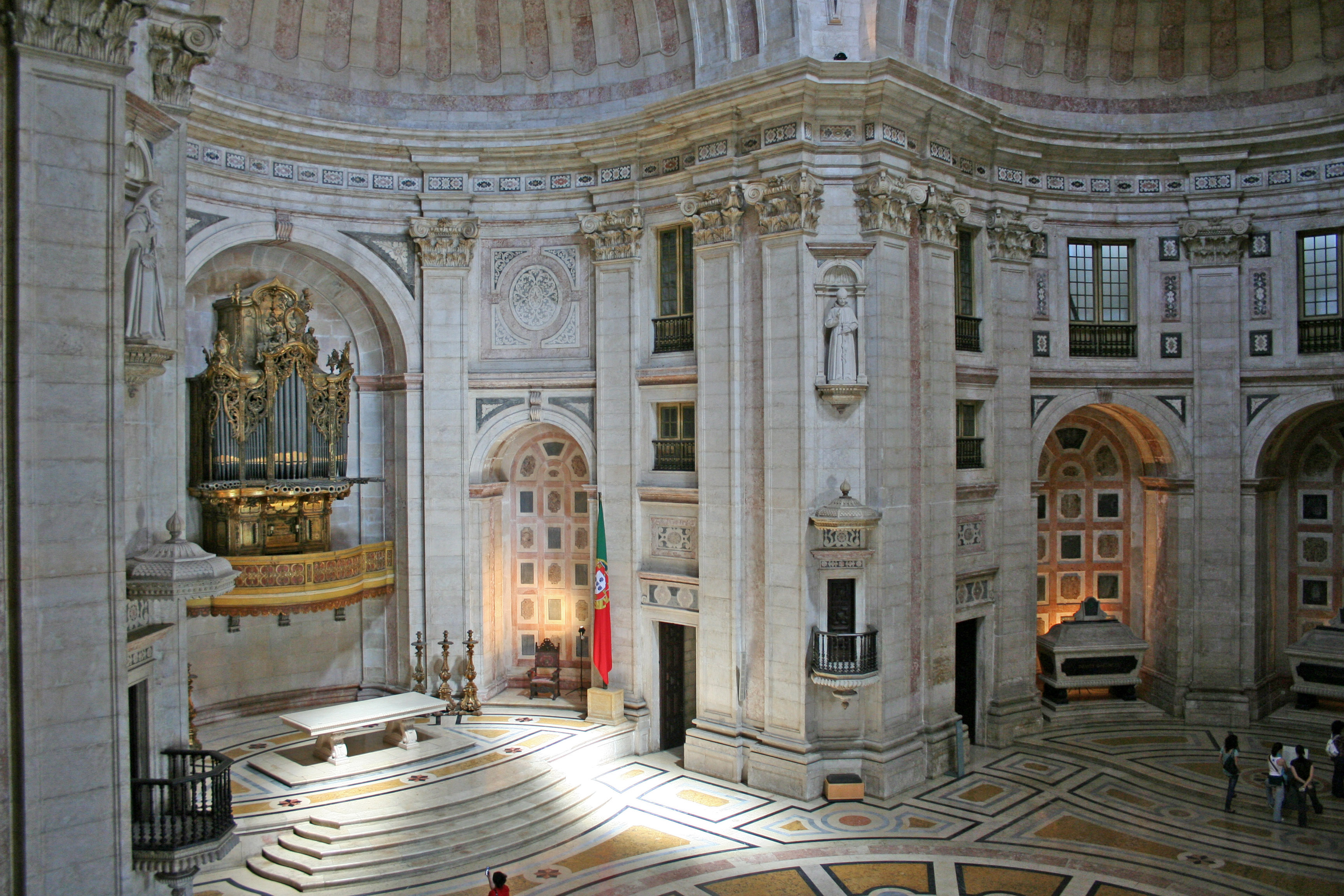
Natitional Pantheon at Santa Engrácia

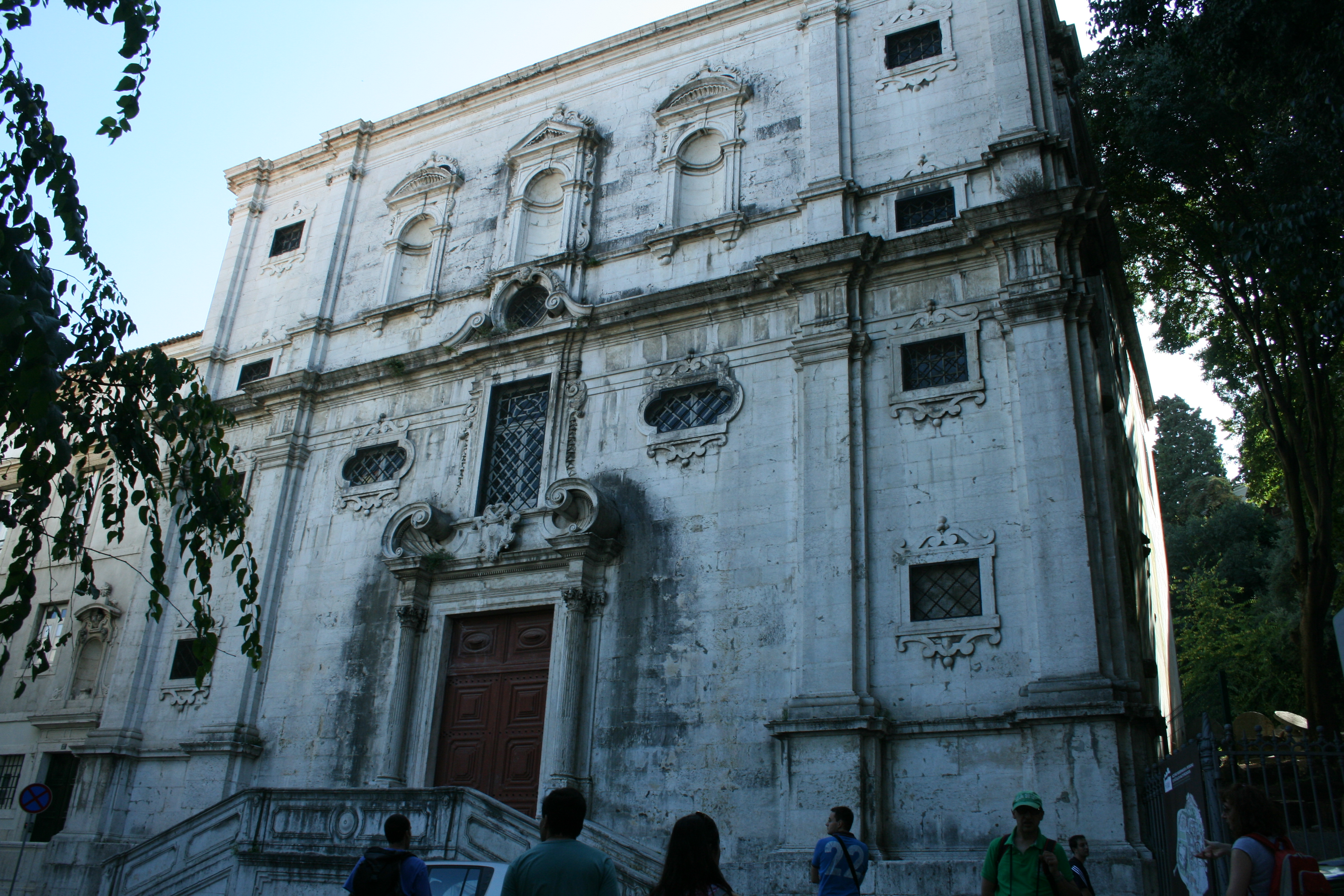
Igreja do Menino Deus (Lisboa)

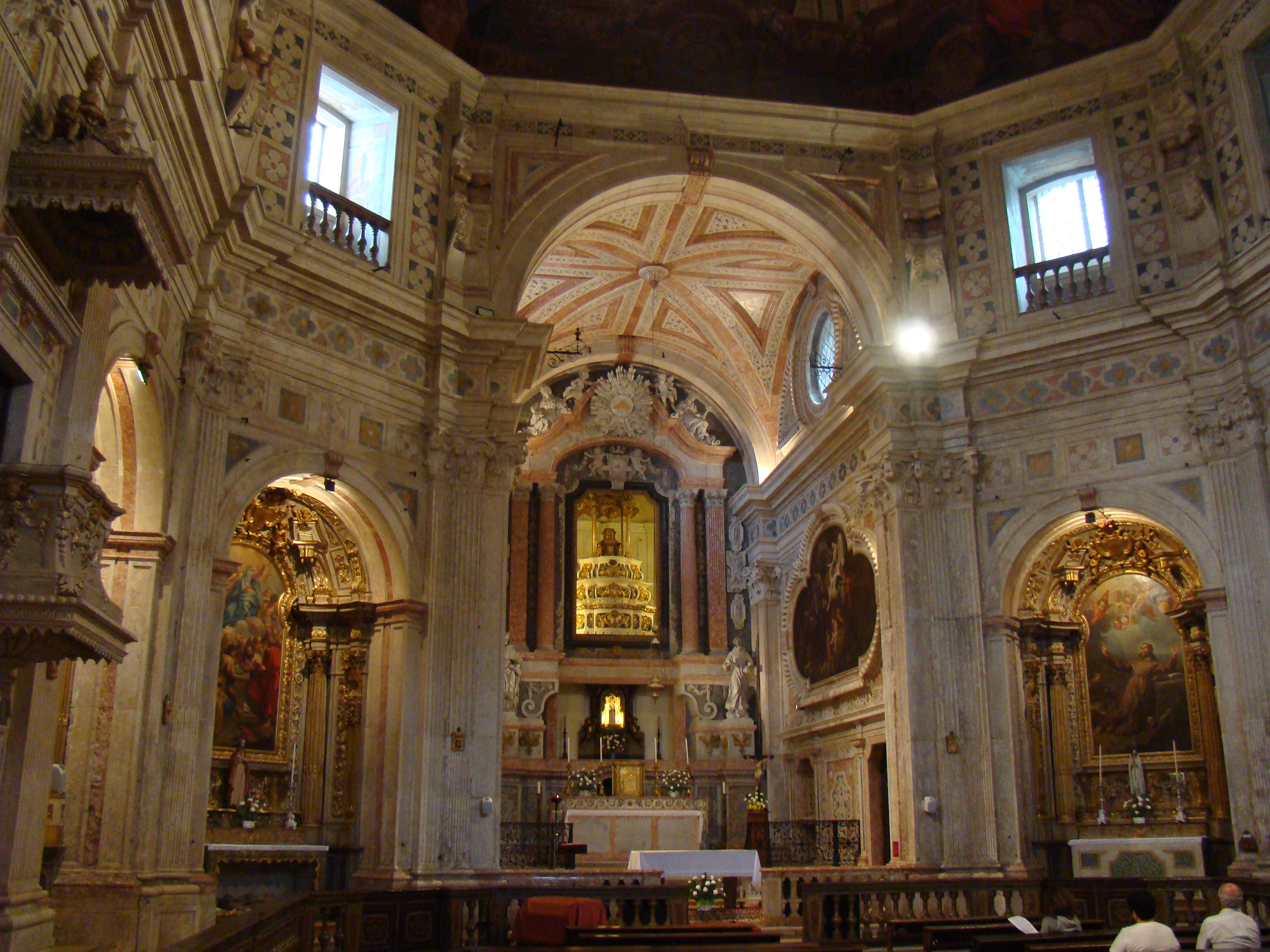
Igreja do Menino Deus (Lisboa)

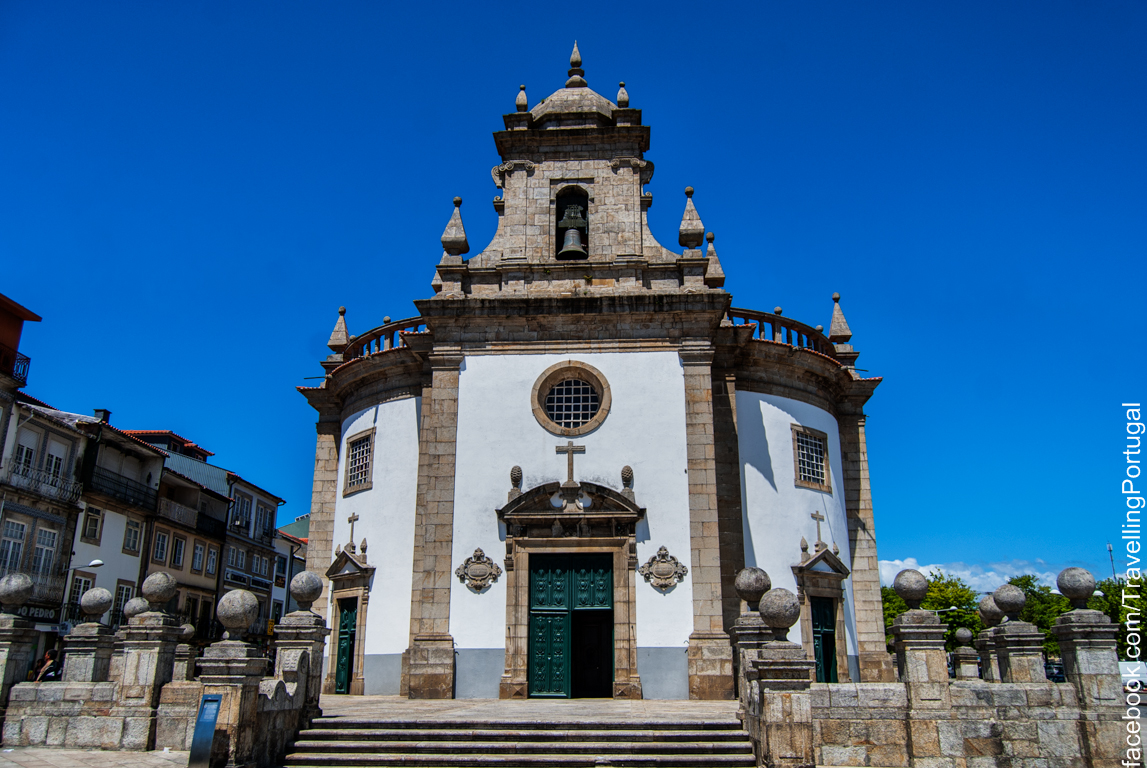
Fachada da Igreja do Bom Jesus da Cruz, Barcelos

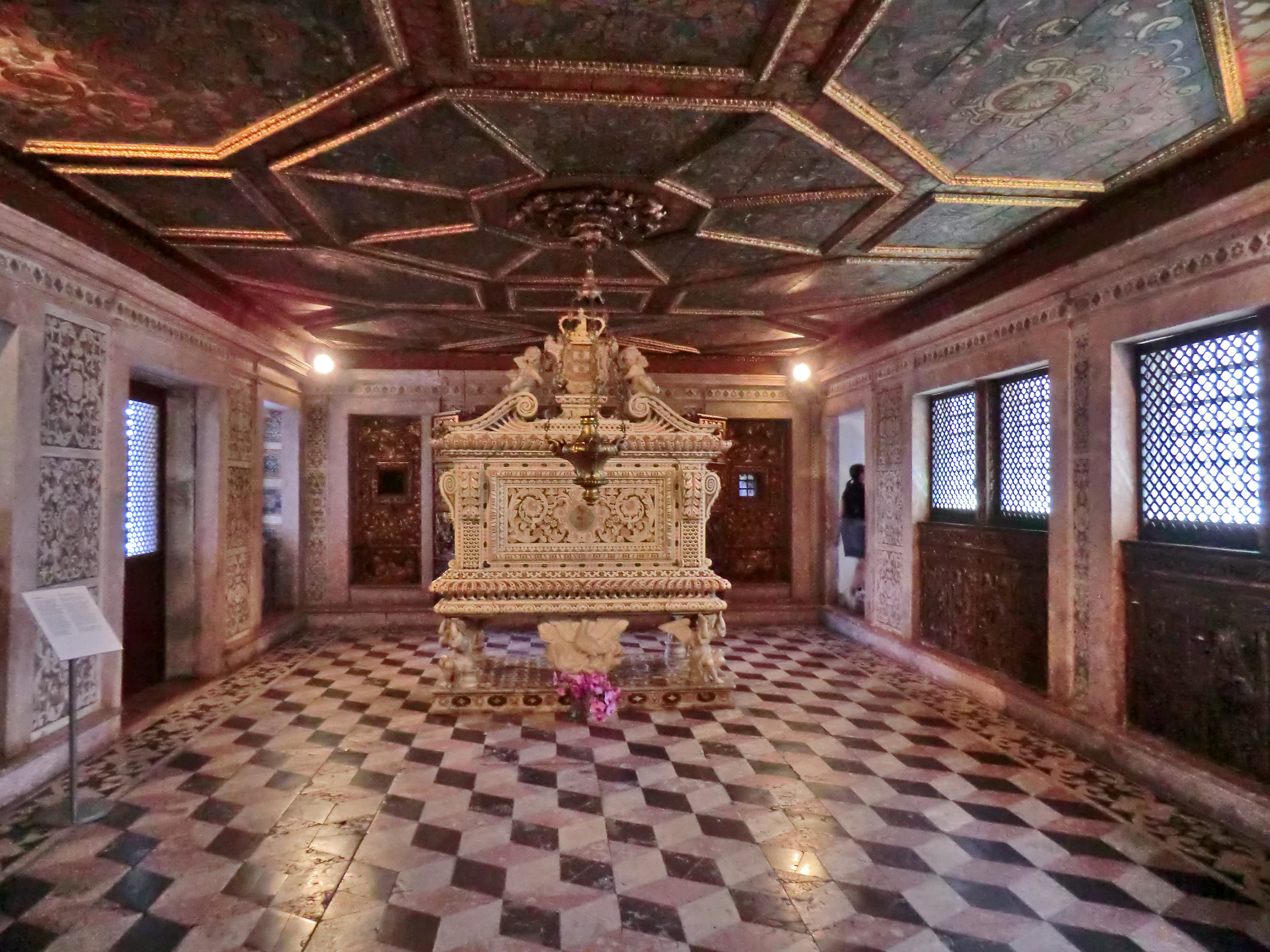
Mosteiro de Jesus, Aveiro

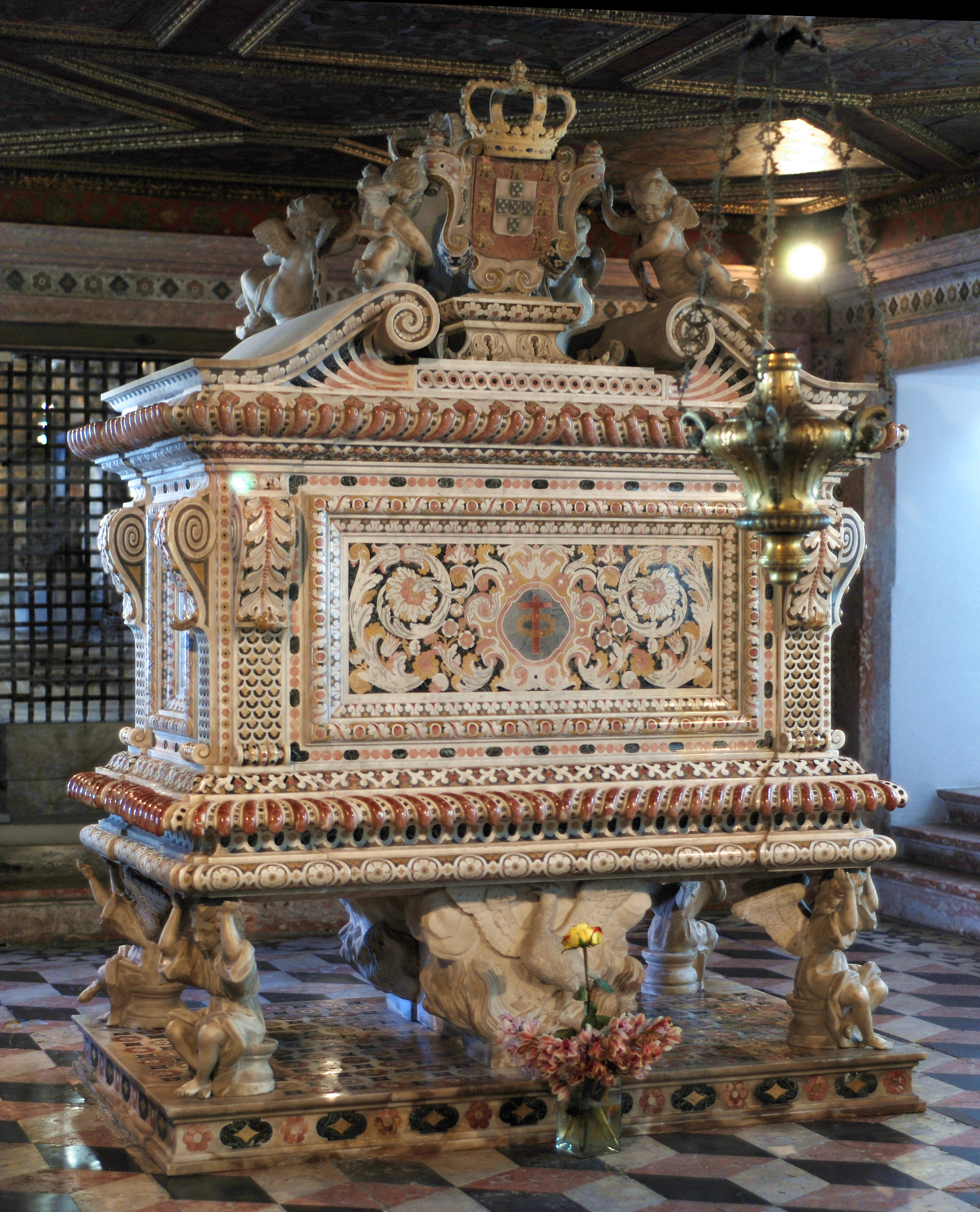
Tomb of Princess Saint Joana of Portugal (Aveiro)
