= Church of Santa Engrácia =

National mausoleum of Portugal

Igreja de Santa Engrácia Panteão Nacional
- Igreja de Santa Engrácia

- Location within Lisbon

Religion
- Affiliation: Roman Catholic
- Diocese: Lisbon District
- Region: Lisboa Region
- Rite: Roman Rite 38.715°N 9.125°W

Location
- Location: Campo de Santa Clara, 1100-365 Lisboa, Portugal
- Municipality: Lisbon

Architecture
- Style: Baroque
- Groundbreaking: 1681
- Completed: 1966

The Church of Santa Engrácia (Portuguese: Igreja de Santa Engrácia, pronounced [iˈɣɾeʒɐ ðɨ ˈsɐ̃tɐ ẽˈɡɾasiɐ]) is a 17th-century monument in Lisbon, Portugal. Originally a church, it was converted into the National Pantheon (Panteão Nacional, pronounced [pɐ̃tiˈɐ̃w nɐsiuˈnal]), in which important Portuguese personalities are buried. It is located in the Alfama neighbourhood, close to another important Lisbon monument, the Monastery of São Vicente de Fora.

== History ==
The current building of the Church of Santa Engrácia substituted previous churches dedicated to a martyr of the city of Braga, Saint Engratia. The first church dedicated to the Saint was sponsored by Infanta Maria of Portugal, Duchess of Viseu, daughter of King Manuel I, around 1568. In 1681, construction of the current church began after previous structures collapsed. The design was the work of João Antunes, royal architect and one of the most important baroque architects in Portugal.

Construction proceeded from 1682 through 1712, when the architect died. King John V lost interest in the project, concentrating his resources in the gigantic Convent of Mafra. The church was not completed until the 20th century, so that obras de Santa Engrácia (literally works of Saint Engratia) has become a Portuguese synonym for an endless construction project. A dome was added, and the church was reinaugurated in 1966.

== Architecture ==
João Antunes prepared an ingenious design for Santa Engrácia, never before attempted in Portugal. The church has a centralised floorplan, with a Greek cross shape. On each corner there is a square tower (the pinnacles were never completed), and the façades are undulated like in the baroque designs of Borromini. The main façade has an entrance hall (galilee) and three niches with statues. The entrance to the church is done through a beautiful baroque portal with the coat-of-arms of Portugal held by two angels. The Church has a high central dome which was completed only in the 20th century.

The harmonious interior of the church is dominated by the curved spaces of the central crossing and naves. The floor and walls are decorated with baroque, polychromed patterns of marble. The magnificent 18th-century baroque organ was brought from Lisbon Cathedral.

== National Pantheon ==
In 1916, during the First Portuguese Republic, the Church of Santa Engrácia was converted into a National Pantheon. It was completed only in 1966, during the government of the dictator António de Oliveira Salazar. There was much speculation that it was completed for the eventual death of Salazar and other high ranking Estado Novo officials, but this was proven false when he died in 1970 and his wishes were revealed to be buried in his hometown of Vimieiro near Santa Comba Dão, which was carried out. Besides Oscar Carmona, no other Estado Novo officials were entombed there.

The personalities entombed here include the Presidents of the Republic Manuel de Arriaga, Teófilo Braga, Sidónio Pais and Óscar Carmona; presidential candidate Humberto Delgado; writers João de Deus, Almeida Garrett, Guerra Junqueiro, Aquilino Ribeiro, Sophia de Mello Breyner Andresen, and Eça de Queiroz; fado singer Amália Rodrigues; and footballer Eusébio. There are cenotaphs to Luís de Camões, Pedro Álvares Cabral, Afonso de Albuquerque, Nuno Álvares Pereira, Vasco da Gama, Henry the Navigator and Aristides de Sousa Mendes.

== Gallery ==
Aerial view

Main facade

Main portal

Rear exterior

Dome exterior

Interior view of main altar, from upper choir

Interior view from dome

Interior view of counter facade, from main altar

Main altar, pipe organ

Cenotaphs of Henry the Navigator, Pedro Álvares Cabral, and Luís de Camões

Cenotaphs of Vasco da Gama, Afonso de Albuquerque, and Nuno Álvares Pereira
