= Monastery of the Mónicas =

Building in Lisbon, Portugal

- Mosteiro das Mónicas
- Location within Lisbon
- Interactive map of Monastery of the Mónicas

Monastery information
- Established: 1585

Site
- Location: São Vicente, Lisbon, Portugal
- Coordinates: 38°42′54.9″N 9°7′49″W

The Monastery of the Mónicas (Portuguese: Mosteiro das Mónicas), located in São Vicente, Lisbon, was a Portuguese nunnery dedicated to the mother of Augustine of Hippo, Saint Monica. It later became a prison.

== History ==
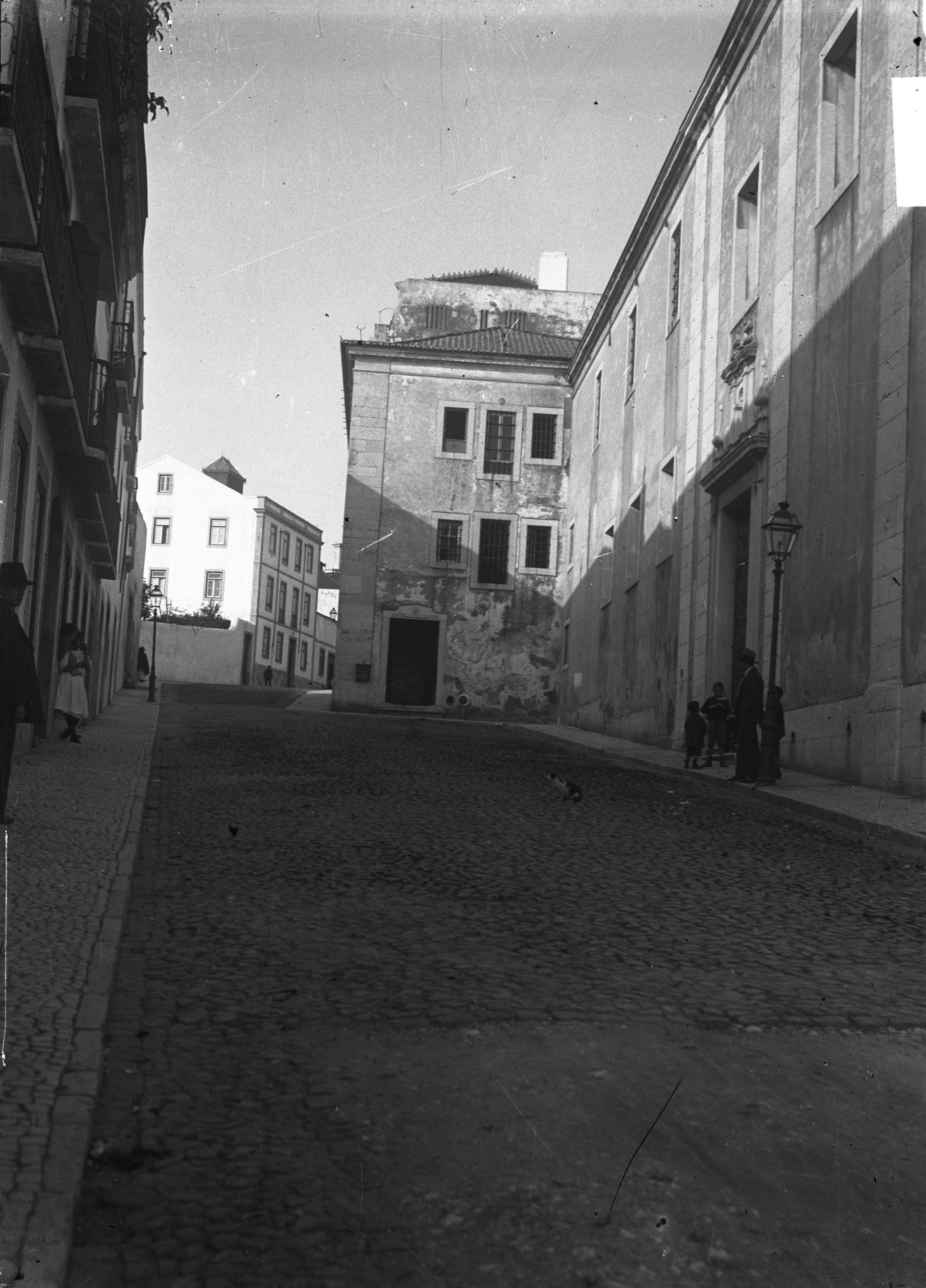
A view of the former-Monastery and prison establishment of Lisbon.

=== Monastery ===
In 1585, a monastery was established dedicated to the religious Order of Saint Augustine, through the initiative of Maria de Abranches, on lands and buildings of her father, Álvaro de Abranches, Captain-major of Azamor. The first stone was laid on 1 January 1586 and the first nuns began arriving on 11 October of the same year. The Cenobitic monastery included 100 devotees, with the three principal founders coming from a building in Évora, dedicated to Menino Jesus (the infant Jesus). The convent chapel was consecrated in 1586.

Before 1680, Manuel João Fonseca had completed the retable dedicated to Nossa Senhora do Rosário (Our Lady of the Rosary). At the beginning of the 18th century, paintings attributed to Bento Coelho da Silveira were also completed.

There was an attempt by the religious to enlarge the monastery's area, to the Rua da Infância in São Vicente and contiguous lands, in order to expand the building and the convent's vegetable garden. It was partially successful. This was at a time when the monastery was growing progressively: by 1707, there were already 277 nuns living at the site.

The convent suffered considerable damage in the 1755 Lisbon earthquake, and was left partially in ruins. At that time there 192 nuns living onsite. In the 6 August 1759 Memórias Paroquiais, signed by the São Vicente parish priest, Francisco José de Matos, the building continued to be referred to as a monastery and were occupied by lay nuns without a patron saint.

The church included alternating altars on either side of the nave, dedicated to Our Lady of the Rosary, John the Baptist, Our Lady of Pain and Our Lady of the Conception on one side, with St John, St Anthony and St Nicholas on the other. The main altar included images of St Augustine of Hippo, St Monica and St Thomas Aquinas. At the time there were three chaplains. For their services, two were paid a stipend of 80 escudos and one was paid 60 escudos.

In 1811, the Brotherhood of Our Lady of Piedade was founded in Costa do Castelo and later at the hermitage of Senhor dos Passos. On 8 August it was transferred to the monastery's church.

A large fire destroyed the dormitory oriented towards São Vicente in 1820. The spaces were not reconstructed.

By 1833, the church (with space to hold 600 faithful) included eight chapels, an altar and images of St Monica, St Augustine and another saint dedicated to the order. Two chapels flanked the presbytery, and housed the Irmandade dos Escravos do Santíssimo (Brotherhood of Blessed Slaves).

On 8 May 1834, the religious order was dissolved across Portugal, yet many of the nuns remained at the site until their deaths.

=== Prison ===
On 9 December 1870, the convent became a possession of the State; On 15 June 1871, King Luís established the Casa de Detenção e Correção da Comarca de Lisboa on the site. This was an institution for males, in order to remove minors from the penal system, including children jailed by administrative authorities or at the request of their parents. The same law authorized a budget of 6,000 escudos to accommodate the ends of the detention house and fix the building of the former convent of the Lay Sisters of St Augustine, denominated the "Mónicas". Public work was initiated to adapt the old convent on 16 February, using prisoners from the Limoeiro prison, under the direction of engineer José Honorato de Campos e Silva. This project was concluded sometime after 12 October 1871. On 19 October, young prisoners detained at the Aljube prison began living at the institution. On 20 October 1872, the building was inaugurated and exceeded the projected cost by 30 escudos, 372 réis: 32 people from Limoeiro entered at the time of its "official" opening. A school was established to minister to the imprisoned youth, primarily basic (obligatory) instruction and music, while youth were obliged to work in the vegetable and scenic gardens.

In 1903, the male prison was moved to the Convent of Cartuxa de Laveiras, in Caxias, and the old nunnery was destined to shelter female prisoners. In 1912, the now female Escola de Reforma de Lisboa (Reformatory School of Lisbon) was abandoned, and reinstalled in the older College of São Patricia, in Costa do Castelo. On 16 April 1918, a decree created the female Civil Prison of Lisbon to intern women in the former-convent outhouses, due to over-capacity at the prison of Aljube. The assumption at the time was that the old convent was adequate for the purpose; it was used as a prison for minors, required little work and included a large courtyard and outhouses that could permit the installation of the population at Aljube. By December 1937, the population at the old convent included 200 inmates, and would eventually reach 300.

On 27 April 1939, the Minister of Justice (Rodrigues Júnior) reported to the Minister of Public Works that jails in central Lisbon, Porto and Coimbra (even after improvised adaptations) were insufficient to accommodate the population incarcerated. There were hygiene and comfort issues at all the institutions. An example of this was at the Mónicas, with could house 200 prisoners, but was occupied by 294. It was necessary to finish the Colónia Penitenciária de Alcoentre (Alcoentre Penitentiary Colony). A similar report was issued on 7 July 1939 by the CCP for the Ministry of Public Works that covered the condition of Portuguese prisons and stating the imperative of executing the 1936 Prison Reform. It detailed the nature, number, capacity and situation of many prisons, and the Minister approved a plan for constructing new institutions - the first Plano das Construções Prisionais (Prison Construction Plan), published on 24 May 1941. This described the function and installation of these establishments, and constituted an important snapshot of the situation in 1939. It further established an obligatory authorization, by the Minister of Public Works and Communication (through the Commission for Prison Construction), to construct new buildings or reconstruct existing ones.

On 2 November 1941, the Director General of Buildings and National Monuments approved a proposal by Horácio Novais to work on the "historic" prisons of Caxias, Limoeiro, Mónicas, Monsanto and Alenquer, for 2,700 escudos. The Sub-Secretary of State for Public Works authorized 190,000 escudos from the coffers of the Conselho Administrativo das Cadeias Civis Centrais de Lisboa (Lisbon Central Civil Prison Administrative Council), in small installments, for urgent repairs at those prisons. Work at the Mónicas prison, a unique circumstance in the group, began on 31 July 1944. Yet, in 1953, the construction of the Cadeia Central de Mulheres in Tires, permitted that the prison population at the old convent be transferred from the old building. The building continued to be part of the Ministry of Justice, and would eventually function as a female block for the jail of Lisbon (one of three sections at the site), with space for 150 prisoners. The 2,705 square metres (29,120 ft^{2}) space, that includes the old cloister (which was used as internal recreational space), includes bunks and isolation cells. On the first floor spaces were reconstructed to allow the operation of a daycare for prisoners, with a patio and terrace. Maria Branca dos Santos, more commonly referred to as "Dona" Branca (1902–1992), was one of the last female prisoners (known chiefly for maintaining a Ponzi scheme in Portugal between 1970 and 1984) to be housed at the famous convent.

In 2005, the jail was part of the Regime Aberto Voltado para o Exterior (Open Regime Aimed at the Exterior); RAVE was a program of the prison system of Lisbon, oriented at promoting post-prison acclimatisation.
