= Panaca Palace =

Palace and Gardens of Panaca
- Palácio Panaca e Jardims
- Interactive map of the Palace and Gardens of Panaca area

General information
- Type: Palace
- Architectural style: Baroque
- Location: São Vicente, Portugal
- Coordinates: 38°43′9.44″N 9°7′6.06″W
- Opened: fl.
- Owner: Portuguese Republic

Technical details
- Material: Masonry

The Palace and Gardens of Panaca (Portuguese: Palácio Panaca e Jardins), sometimes characterized as the Palácio Palha (for the Pereiras, Farias, and Almeidas families) is a palace within the Santa Engrácia area of the civil parish of São Vicente, in the municipality in the Portuguese capital of Lisbon.

== History ==
The history of the building, owned by Manuel Barreto Quaresma, remotes to the reign of King Sebastian, who had a house on the lands of São Vicente. During his reign, there were many recreational estates in Lisbon. The Palace was constructed in the second half of the 18th century by its first property-owner, D. Luis de Meneses, Master of Pancas and Ponte da Barca, holder of the title of Commander of Santos-o-Novo. By June 1815, the descendants of the Meneses family had put the property and gardens up for sale, which was unsuccessful, and it was eventually placed on sale again in 1816. By 1820, the building was once again for sale, this time by the Palha family, who were residents of the zone.

In 1968, the palace was acquired by the municipal council of Lisbon, in order to demolish and extend the width of Rua de Santa Apolónia, but it is likely that some problem arose during the transaction. By 1983, the building was still associated with the Van Zeller family descendants.

In February 1981 and September, the Ministry of Culture issued a dispatch, classifying the building as a Property of Public Interest.

Yet, it was only in 1990, that projects were initiated, using European Union funds to restore the property. This recuperation began in 1992, under the design of architect Frederico George (1915–1994). But, the architect died in February 1994, leave some details to resolve, resulting in Quirino da Fonseca intervening in the reconstruction. In 2009, the project was reformulated as a Hotel de Charme, but was cancelled by the Comissão Municipal de Habitação (Municipal Commission of Habitação), who intended to use the space for public housing.

On 14 February 2010, a dispatch fixed the building within a Zona Especial de Proteção (Special Protection Zone), that included the Barbadinhos Elevator (1176/2010, Diário da República, Série-2, 248). But, on 18 October 2010, the building was placed on sale, to be transformed into a hotel.

== Architecture ==
The palatial residence is located in an urban setting, at the junction of intersection Rua de Santa Apolónia and Travessa do Recolhimento de Lázaro Leitão. To the northwest is the ample walled gardens that integrates into the area of Santa Apolónia, whose urban area is still marked by rural and urban elements, and includes several exceptional architectural objects, including: the Monastery of Santos-o-Novo, the residence of Palácio Van-Zeller, in addition to other palatial homes, such as the Veloso Palace, and Palace of the Count Barão de Alvito and Palace of Coimbra.

The building consists of an L-shaped body, a complex volume of several stories, with two facades. The eastern frontage, along Rua de Santa Apolónia, is a large, extensive two-story frontage with pillars, rectangular doors and windows on the first registry and a second story separated by limestone frieze, also with rectangular windows and iron grading. This facade is decorated with cornices supported by a simple edge. The smaller northeastern facade, along Travessa do Recolhimento de Lázaro Leitão, is separated from the anterior by stone corners, and includes two story facade, marked by three veins with an attic louver window. The central vain is the largest, with framed doorway decorated in limestone, providing access to a truncated elliptical interior atrium, connected by staircase to an oval hall, to a master staircase and the noble hall. This space occupies the eastern wing of the palace, a rectangular hall with two wings on the extreme western facade, that overlooks the gardens over five glass arches.

Along the corner of the noble hall, is a stone coat-of-arms for the Pereiras, Farias and Almeidas (known as the Palha family).
