= Vimieiro (Santa Comba Dão) =

- Civil parish
- Location in Portugal
- Coordinates: 40°23′15″N 8°07′25″W
- Country: Portugal
- Region: Centro
- Intermunic. comm.: Viseu Dão Lafões
- District: Viseu
- Municipality: Santa Comba Dão
- Disbanded: 2013

Population (2011)
  - Total: 804
- Time zone: UTC+00:00 (WET)
  - Summer (DST): UTC+01:00 (WEST)

Vimieiro is a village and former civil parish (freguesia) in the Portuguese municipality of Santa Comba Dão in the Viseu District. Since the administrative reorganization of Portuguese sub-municipalities (freguesias) in 2012/2013, it has been part of the sub-municipality of 'Óvoa en Vimieiro'. In 2011 it had 804 residents. It is best known as the birthplace and resting place of the dictator under the Estado Novo regime, António de Oliveira Salazar.

== History ==
During the Napoleonic Wars on the Iberian Peninsula French troops under General André Masséna passed through Vimieiro in 1810, heading south towards the Portuguese capital of Lisbon. The population, among other things, destroyed the bridge over the Dão River to delay the advance.

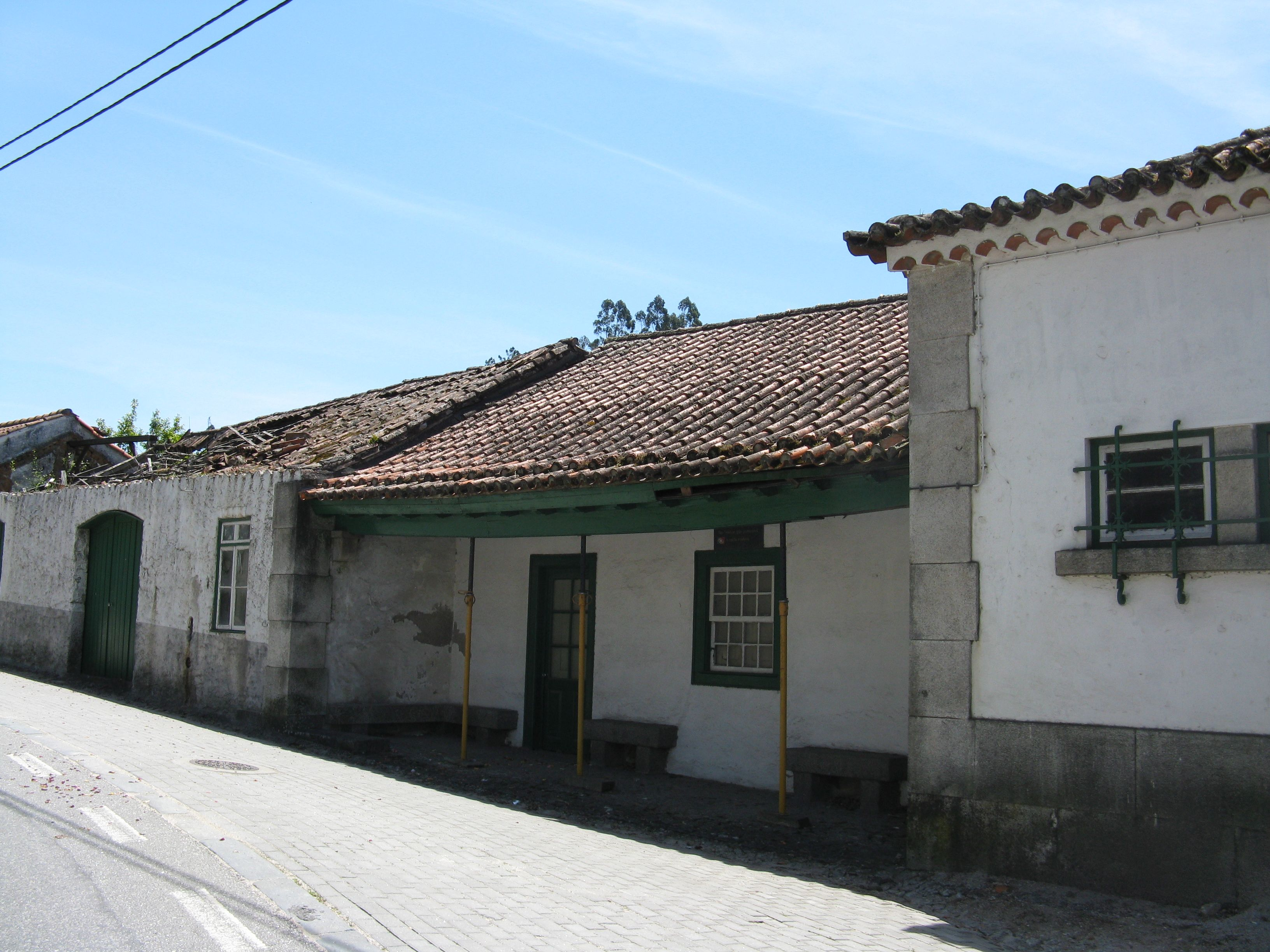
Salazar's birthplace

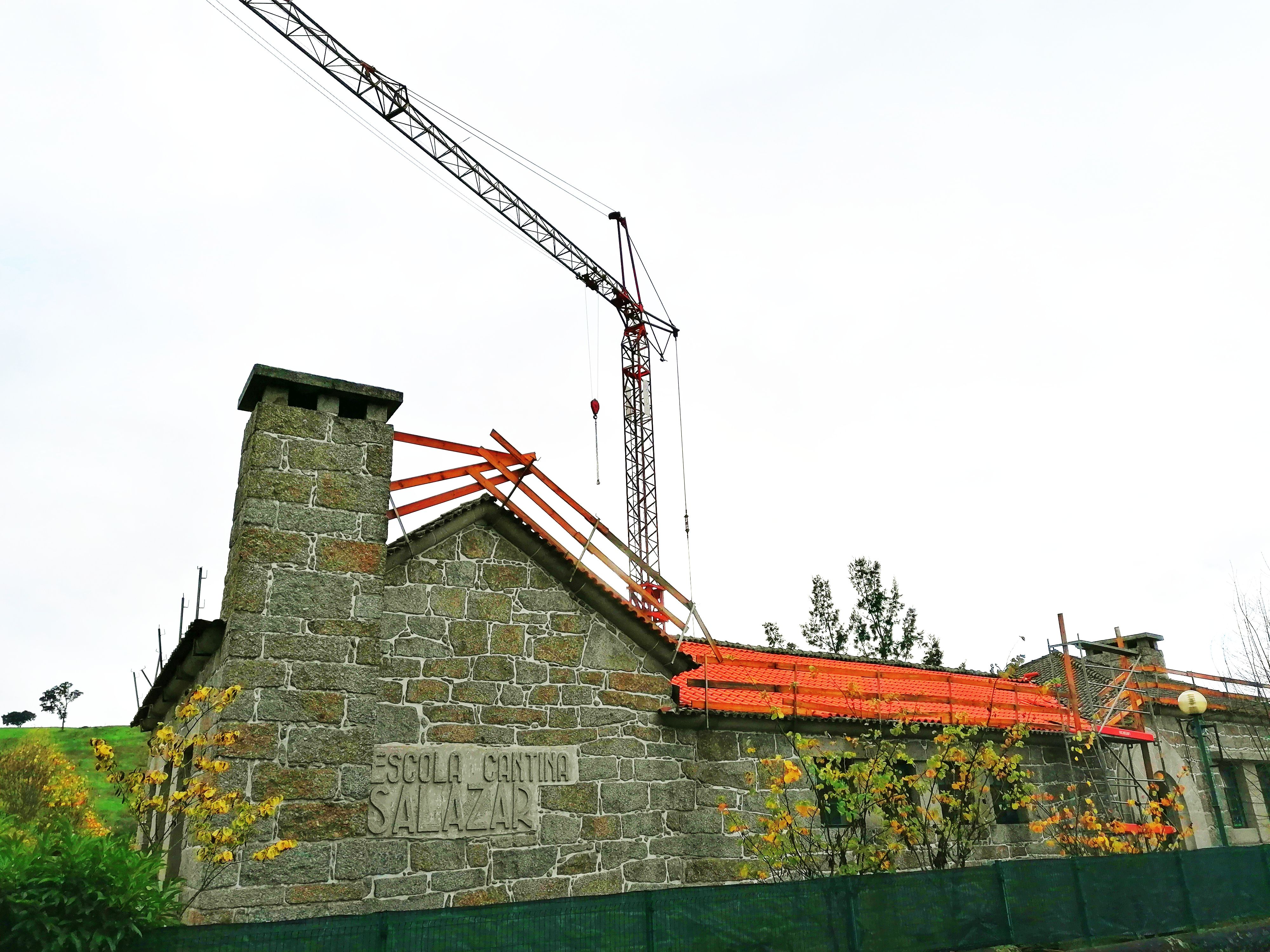
The proposed museum location under reconstruction

Salazar was born in Vimieiro on 28 April 1889. He died on 27 July 1970 and was buried in Vimieiro, according to his wishes, with his body being carried by a special train from Lisbon. In August 2019, after years of discussion, a start was made on developing a study centre in Vimieiro about the Estado Novo. The centre was planned to be officially named the Centro Interpretativo do Estado Novo (Estado Novo Interpretation Centre), but it attracted considerable opposition, with opponents labelling it as the "Salazar Museum". Opposition was expressed in Portugal'’s parliament, with politicians arguing that it would be "an insult to the victims of the dictatorship". Others thought that it would turn Vimieiro into a right-wing pilgrimage site. The centre was planned to operate in the former primary school of Vimieiro, known as the Escola Cantina Salazar, which had been disused for a long time and is a short distance from Salazar's birthplace.

There is a street named after Salazar in Vimieiro and his birthplace, on that street, still exists, although it is not open to the public. Both the house and the school are listed buildings.
