= Panaca Summit Archeological District =

Historic district in Nevada, United States

- U.S. National Register of Historic Places
- U.S. Historic district
- Nearest city: Panaca, Nevada
- Area: 7,040 acres (2,850 ha)
- NRHP reference No.: 90000362
- Added to NRHP: March 19, 1990

The Panaca Summit Archeological District, near Panaca, Nevada is a 7,040-acre (2,850 ha) area that was listed on the National Register of Historic Places in 1990. It included 74 contributing sites. Archeological sites are listed on the National Register for their potential to provide important information in the future.

Some of the sites were investigated in 1986–1987 in connection with a construction project that was to lay fiber optic cable through the area.
