= Luís Gomes (disambiguation) =

Luís Gomes is a municipality in the state of Rio Grande do Norte in the Northeast region of Brazil.

Luís Gomes may also refer to the following persons:

- Luís Gomes da Mata Coronel, Portuguese nobleman and the 5th High-Courier of the Kingdom of Portugal
  - Luís Gomes da Mata, Portuguese nobleman and the 7th High-Courier of the Kingdom of Portugal
- Luís Gomes Sambo (born 1950), Angolan medical doctor and politician who served as vice minister of health
- Luís Fábio Gomes (born 1975), Brazilian football player
- Luís Gomes (cyclist) (born 1994), Portuguese cyclist

== See also ==
- Luis Gómez (disambiguation)
