= Pontinha (Odivelas) =

- Civil parish
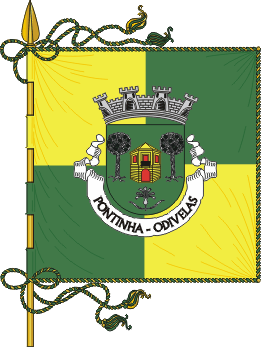
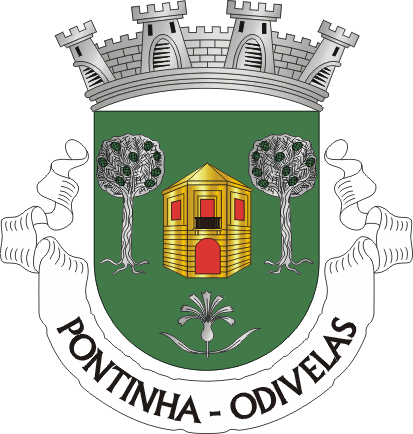
- Flag Coat of arms

- Location in Portugal
- Coordinates: 38°46′37″N 9°12′14″W
- Country: Portugal
- Region: Lisbon
- Metropolitan area: Lisbon
- District: Lisbon
- Municipality: Odivelas
- Established: Settlement: c. 1500; Parish: 28 June 1971; Civil parish: 30 November 1984
- Disbanded: 2013

Area
  - Total: 4.64 km^{2} (1.79 sq mi)
- Elevation: 48 m (157 ft)

Population (2001)
  - Total: 24,023
  - Density: 5,180/km^{2} (13,400/sq mi)
- Time zone: UTC+00:00 (WET)
  - Summer (DST): UTC+01:00 (WEST)
- Postal code: 1675-183
- Patron: Sagrada Familia
- Website: http://www.jf-pontinha.pt

Pontinha, with an area of 4.64 km2, is a former civil parish in the municipality of Odivelas, Portugal. In 2013, the parish merged into the new parish Pontinha e Famões. It is on the periphery of the metropolitan area of Lisbon, District of Lisbon, within the NUTS III Region of Lisboa e Vale do Tejo.

== History ==
Although it is likely that Arabs settled in the vicinity around the 14th century, the first documented settlement dates back to the 17th and 18th centuries, when nobles and some clergy established estates in the area. In its history, the region was a small agglomeration of inhabitants, living along the Rio da Costa (whose spring flowed from the Casal do Castelo), and serviced by a small dock (Porto da Paiã) that allowed the transport of goods to and from Lisbon (and permitted a nascent economy). The Quinta da Pontinha existed, at least, since 1657. This farm estate changed proprietors (and names) during several centuries: at the beginning of the 18th century, it was known as Quinta dos Brasileiros (owing to its wealthy owners originating from Brazil), and after various new occupants, in 1796, it was known as Quinta dos Valadares. It was only in the 19th century, that began to be known as Quinta da Pontinha.

For many years, Pontinha was subdivided into properties and seigniorial holdings; some of these names remain important toponymic references in the community, such as Casal do Falcão (where the painter Vieira Lusitano lived), Quinta da Paiã (or Casal Novo), Casal de Azeitão, Quinta da Pentieira or Quinta do Enforcado. Lisboetas, during the 18th and 19th century, were visitors to the area of Paiã, known for the "clear fresh air"; the wealthy and upwardly mobile citizens of Lisbon would attend theatres and festivals: Sebastião José de Carvalho e Melo, 1st Marquis of Pombal was a frequent visitor to the diplomatic home of the King of Prussia in Pontinha.

Over the centuries, the scattered population centers have merged with growth. Pontinha was part of the much larger municipality of Belém around 1852, passing briefly into the administration of Olivais around 1886, before being administered by Loures after 26 July 1886. It was defined by the construction of the Estrada Militar ou Fiscal, which facilitated the imposition of taxes on local commerce.

By the beginning of the 20th century (March 1917), the Escola Profissional Agrícola D. Dinis, situated in Paiã, had, since its founding, administered the education of agricultural sciences. Its heritage included approximately 100 hectares (1,000,000 m^{2}) used as pastureland and/or lands for cultivation. Similarly, the Centro Escolar Republicano Tenente Valdez (Republican Central School Lieutnenat Valdez) was established during this period in the Chapel of Nossa Senhora dos Prazeres, which was completely abandoned by 1911 (even after extensive restoration was completed in 1908).

By 1936, the first electric light arrived in the parish, and in 1947 the first public works that would bring canalized water and sanitation to the population of 2507 consumers (completed in 1949). By 1950, a demographic explosion resulted in the encroachment of residential dwellings that transformed Pontinha into a bedroom community of Lisbon.

On 28 June 1971, the patriarch of Lisbon created the ecclesiastical parish of Pontinha, from a portion of the parish of Santíssimo Nome de Jesus de Odivelas, even as most of the religious connections within the civil parish were associated with the neighboring parish of São Lourenço de Carnide. The religious parish is centered on the Chapel of the Sagrada Família, today a church, a temple designed by Júlio Pomar.

On 25 April 1974, the command post for the Movimento das Forças Armadas (MFA) was established in Pontinha. In the aftermath of the Carnation Revolution (1974), after Marcelo Caetano surrendered to General António de Spínola, members of the Estado Novo government (including Caetano) were transported by armoured car to the military engineering barracks in PontinhA, where they remained overnight. The Pontinha barracks were also the location from which Major Otelo Saraiva de Carvalho directed the coup d'état during the events of the revolution. The garrison was later transformed into a museum, established through a protocol between the 1st Engineering Regiment and the Comissão Instaladora do Município de Odivelas. The barracks serve nowadays as HQ of GNR's special operations group, GIOE.

An administrative division of the municipality of Odivelas since 1984, under Law No. 44/84, approved on 30 November 1984 and published on 31 December 1984, it was de-annexed from the parish of Odivelas. Quickly, the parish was elevated to the status of vila or town under Law No. 75/91 (16 August 1991) and approved on 16 June 1991.

== Geography ==
It is limited in the north by the Odivelan parishes of Famões and Odivelas, to the west by Amadora Municipality (the parish of Alfornelos) and in the south by the municipality of Lisbon (parish of Carnide), in addition to Sintra Municipality. The territory that composes the parish, was once a grouping of estates, farms and agricultural fields: the Escola Profissional Agrícola D. Dinis (D. Dinis Professional Agricultural School) is one of the few remnants of this era. After the 1950s, there were many demographic shifts in Lisbon that resulted in the area's increasing importance as a residential "neighborhood". These barrios, some of which had their basis in illegal squatting or tenements, have since developed into intricate parts of the community. The population is relatively youthful, with about 5% of which includes seniors or retirement age residents. The parish contains the localities Bairro Novo de Santo Elói, Paiâ, Pontinha, Presa, Serra da Luz, Vale Grande and Vale Pequeno.

== Economy ==
The economy of the parish is primarily associated with the tertiary sector industries; principally, these include commercial shops, restaurants, personal and domestic services. Equally important, is the civil construction sector and industrial services, such as rubber manufacturers, metallurgy, glues/resins, marble-workers, paints and frozen products.

== Architecture ==
=== Civic ===
- Edifício Velho Mirante (Oldview Building) - located on Rua de Santo Eloy (in the centre of the parish), the building dates back to the 18th century, and is unusual for its trapezoidal entrance and wrought-iron gate. Although currently a restaurant, the building was owned by the 18th century nobility, a probably a carriage house.
- Núcleo Museológico do Posto de Comando do MFA (Museum/Command Post of the Armed Forces Movement) - the historical command post for the MFA, responsible for toppling the dictatorship of the Estado Novo, and where Marcelo Caetano was briefly detained/arrested before being sent into exile in Madeira.
