= Palace of Correio-Mor =

Palace of the Postmaster General of Portugal
- Palácio do Correio-Mor
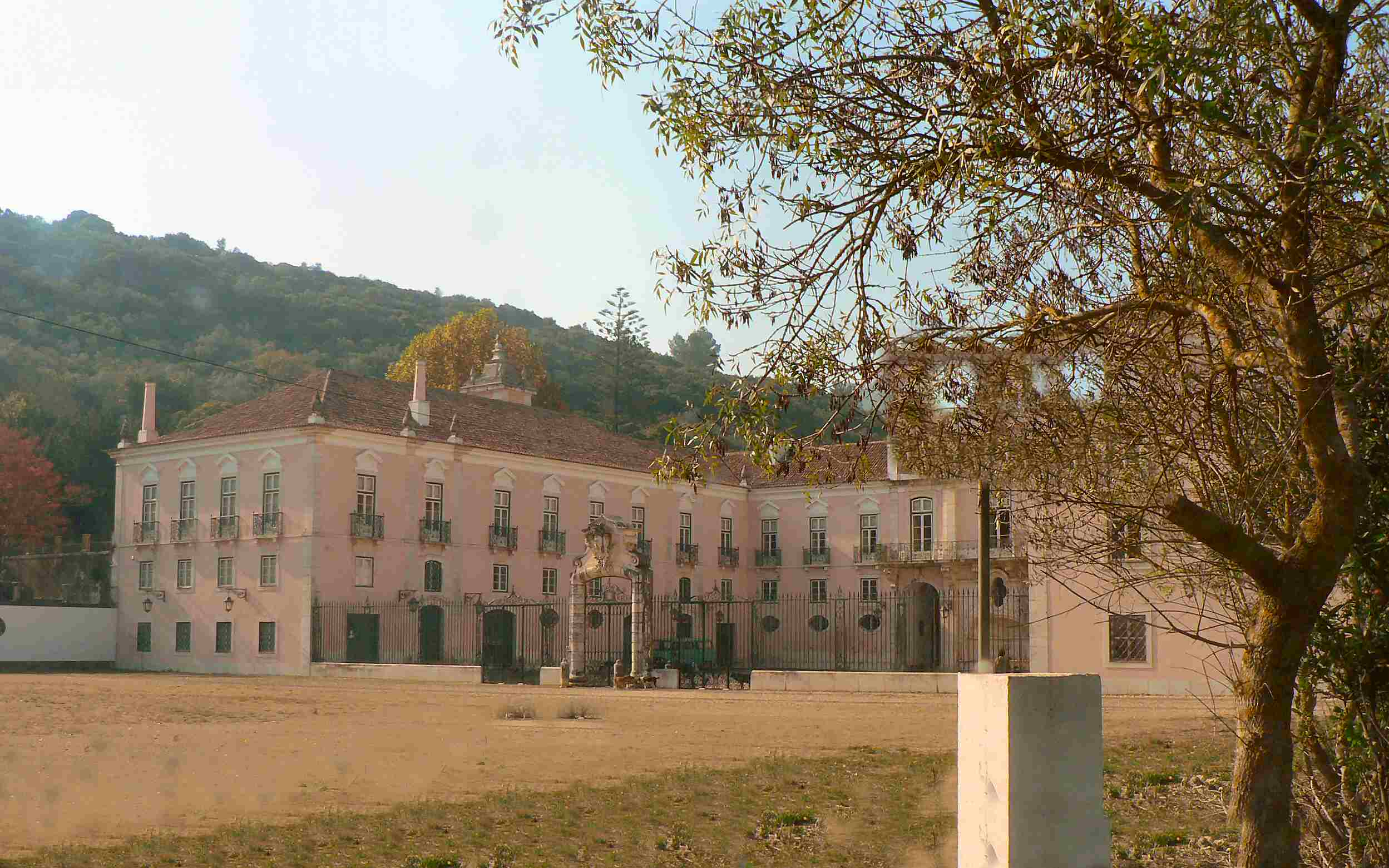
- An oblique image of the Palace of the Postmaster General of Portugal, showing entrance gate and southern wing

General information
- Type: Palace
- Architectural style: Baroque
- Location: Loures, Portugal
- Coordinates: 38°49′39.22″N 9°11′3.65″W
- Opened: fl. 1606
- Owner: Portuguese Republic

Technical details
- Material: Ashlar masonry

Design and construction
- Architect: António Canevari

Website
- http://www.palaciodocorreiomor.pt/

The Palace of the Correio-Mor, Loures (Portuguese: Palácio do Correio-Mor), is a palatial residence in the civil parish of Loures, in the municipality of the same name in the periphery of the Portuguese capital of Lisbon. The imposing Baroque-era residence, is a U-shaped layout, consisting of a courtyard leading to a staircase and a two-storey building decorated in azulejos, stucco artistic works, and paintings that were once home to the Counts and Marquesses of Penafiel. Appropriately translated into British English, the Estate is called Palace of the Postmaster General of Portugal.

== History ==
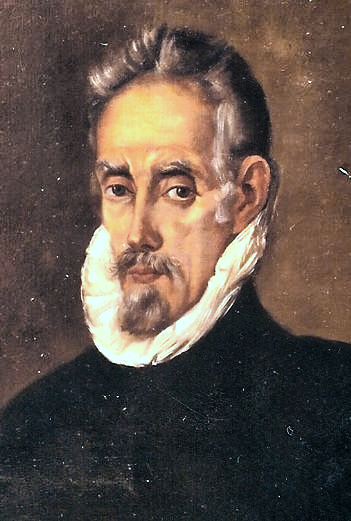
D. António Gomes da Matta Coronel – 6th Postmaster General (1607-1641)

There are records showing the existence of residences in this location, since the 16th century, and that at the end of the century, the family of Gomes de Elvas rented the Quinta da Mata from the monastery of Odivelas. A Jewish family, uncommon for the time, in 1606 King Philip III of Spain bestowed Luís Gomes de Elvas Coronel a noble title, in gratitude for his services to the Crown (during the Iberian Union). At the same time, the monarch altered his surname to in conformity to New Christian requirements, to Gomes da Mata. Simultaneously, he conferred on the nobleman the title of High-Courier (or Postmaster General), which consolidated his importance to the Kingdom's commercial or financial sectors. In this epoch, the buildings of the estate, corresponding to the southern wing were simple structures, until the beginning of the 18th century.

Luís Vitório de Sousa Coutinho da Matta, 9th Correio-Mor moved into the manor in Quinta da Matta in 1730, where the southern wing of the Palace is today located. In 1735, the square/courtyard was reconstructed, taking on its current visible form, by the son, José António da Matta de Sousa Coutinho. The great interventions began in the chapel, whose tower was completed in 1744. These early interventions were terminated ten years later, and consecrated by His Eminence the Cardinal Patriarch of Lisbon, D. Tomás de Almeida (owner of the Palace of Santo Antão do Tojal), who died in 1754.

New interventions occurred in the 18th century, just following the 1755 Lisbon earthquake, under the direction of José António da Mata de Sousa Coutinho, 10th Correio-Mor, and concluded in the gardens and farm, between 1765 and 1766, while the palace was completed in 1766, although the interiors were not completed until 1790.

Many of these adaptions and remodelling continued on until 1790, when José António's son, Manuel José da Matta Sousa Coutinho took up the title of the 11th and last official High Courier. After this, the title was reincorporated by the Crown, and Manuel José received a rent and noble peerage (1st Count of Penafiel), while renting out the estate until 1812.

In 1833, he returned from self-imposed exile (owing to the Napoleonic conflicts), where he yielded the residence to shelter the injured from the Liberal Wars. At the same time, he begin a process of remodeling to improve the spaces, including painting the ceiling in the Sala do Brasão and adding framed paintings over the doors, as well as restoring many of the azulejos in the building.

The marriage of his daughter (in 1859) resulted in the transfer of ownership to her, and her husband, a Brazilian diplomat. By 1871, improvements to the Sala Central (Central Hall) and Sala de Música (Hall of Music), which received stucco decoration, were completed under their stewardship.

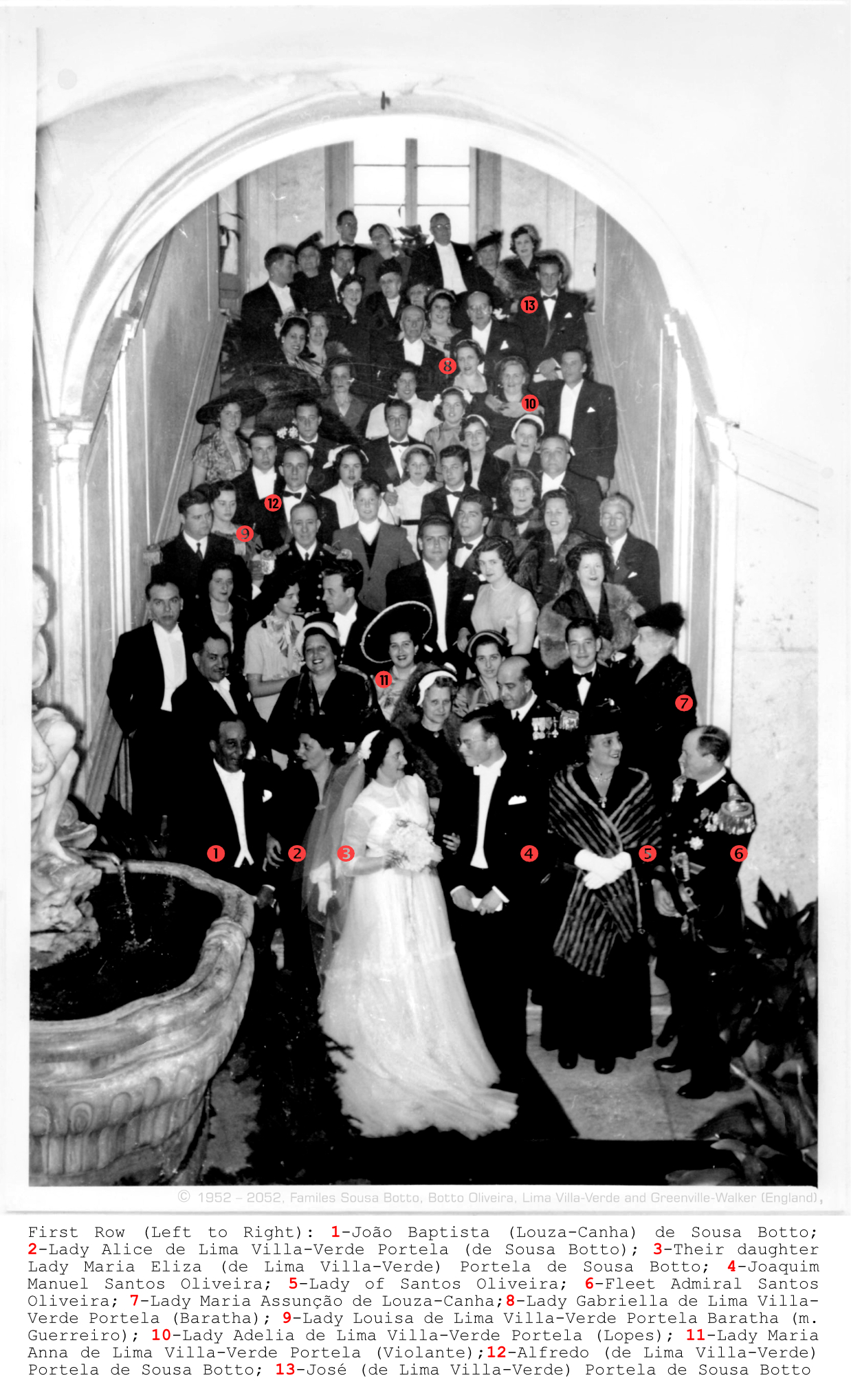
Correio-Mor Palace Family Owners' Daughter's Wedding - 1958

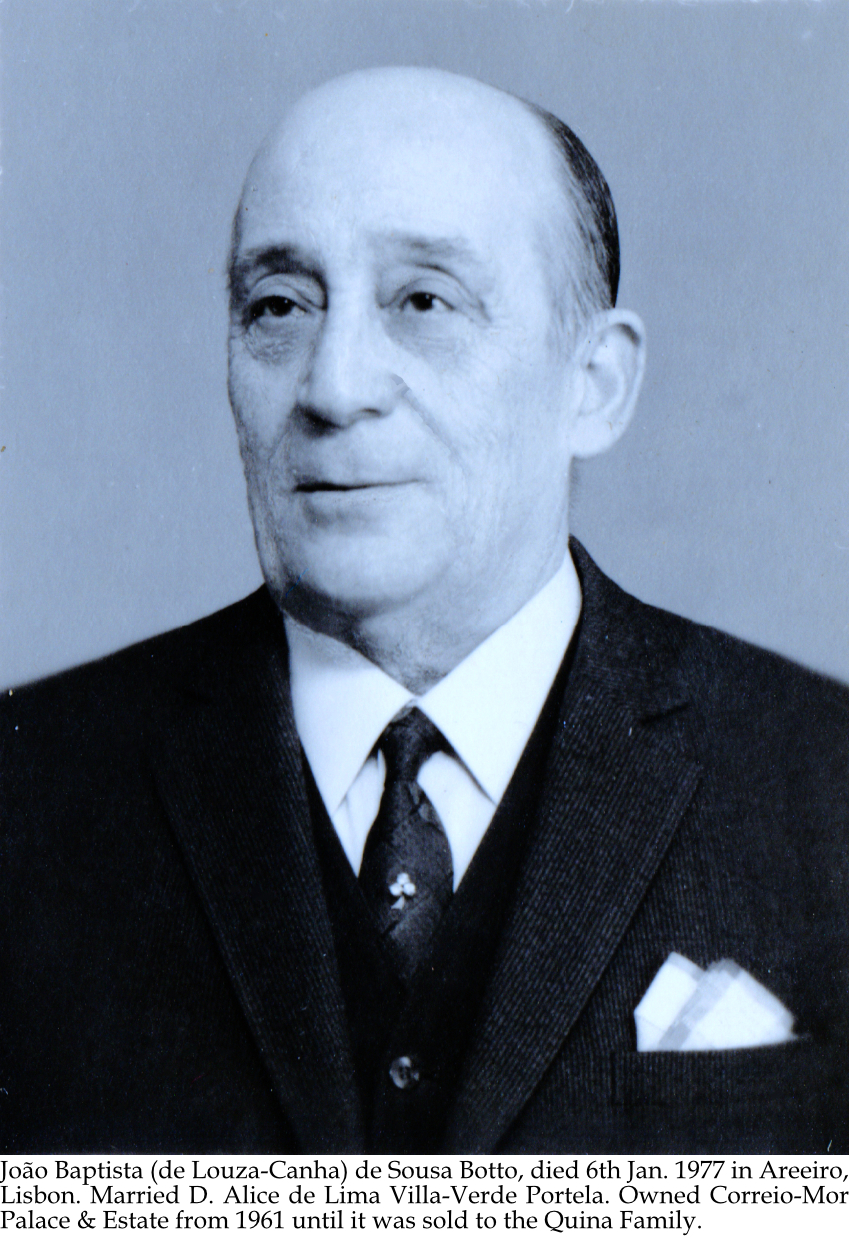
João Baptista (Louza-Canha) de Sousa Botto

The residence remained in the hands of the descendants of the last High-Courier (Manuel José da Matta Sousa Coutinho) and the Counts/Marquesses of Penafiel, who allowed the building to fall into ruin. As a result, and owing to financial difficulties, in 1875, the property was sold to a very wealthy Gentleman, Quirino Luís António Louza.

His daughter, D. Filipa Maria de Louza-Canha, who was married to José Baptista Canha, contracted craftsmen to complete a few restoration projects. Following her death, the palace and Estate was inherited by D. Filipa Maria's Heir Apparent, D. Maria da Assunção de Louza-Canha, who died in 1961.

In 1961, D. Maria da Assunção de Louza-Canha's nephew, João Baptista de Sousa Botto took over the Estate, being the sole Heir Apparent. The property remained in use, although it was not inhabited permanently. João Baptista de Sousa Botto married D. Alice de Lima Villa-Verde Portela de Sousa Botto and had three children; D. Maria Elisa de Lima Villa-Verde Portela de Sousa Botto, Alfredo (de Lima Villa-Verde) Portela de Sousa Botto and José (de Lima Villa-Verde) Portela de Sousa Botto. There is available photographic evidence of the Wedding of D. Maria Elisa de Lima Villa-Verde Portela de Sousa Botto Oliveira to Joaquim Manuel de Oliveira, the son of a highly respected Portuguese Navy Fleet Admiral.

There are several living descendants from this family, all of whom have shared and fond memories of the building and its historic relevance as a point of reference to all family members. At time of writing, D. Alice's son José had a daughter born in 1964, D. Maria da Assunção de Sousa Botto, the other son, Alfredo had two children, João Mario Gil de Sousa Botto (married with issue) and Francisco José Gil de Sousa Botto (married without issue), and D. Alice's daughter D. Maria Eliza (whose wedding official photo is published herein), had two sons; João Manuel de Sousa Botto Santos Oliveira (deceased) and Luís Manuel de Sousa Botto Santos Oliveira. D. Alice's elder sister, Lady Maria Gabriella de Lima Villa-Verde Portela Baratha had a daughter, Lady Louise who married and had a son, Lewis Gabriel Greenville-Walker KGCC ROSMW (Portugal), (née Luis José de Lima Villa-Verde Baratha R. Guerreiro). All descendants are able to attest to the history authenticity of the building and the Estate, from the 1950s until the sale to the Quina Family.

The wedding took place at Correio-Mor Palace in the late 1950s. All of D. Alice de Lima Villa-Verde Portela de Sousa Botto's sisters (the eldest, D. Maria Gabriela de Lima Villa-Verde Portela Baratha, D. Adélia de Lima Villa-Verde Portela Lopes and D. Maria Anna de Lima Villa-Verde Portela Violante) were often privy to the Estate, spending their Summer months at the Palace, sharing Summertime at another two properties as well, Quinta do Fetalinho and Quinta do Torneiro, in Louza de Cima, the latter estates into the late 1980s.

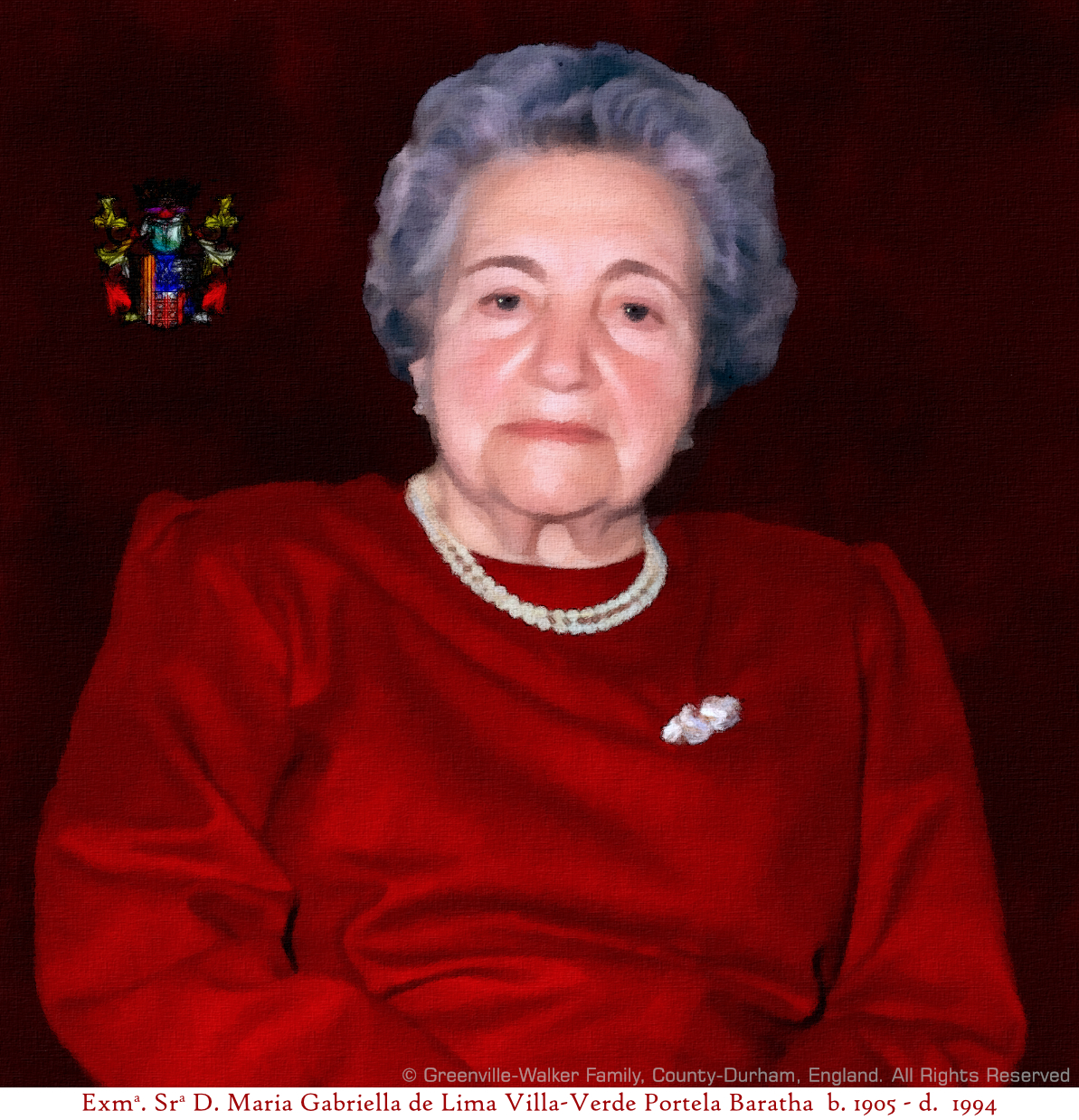
Lady Gabriela de Lima Villa-Verde Portela (Baratha), Elder Sister of Lady Alice de Lima Villa-Verde Portela (de Souza Botto), co-owner of Correio Mor Palace (m. João Baptista Souza Botto). © Greenville-Walker Family, England. All Rights Reserved.

Thus it is materially inaccurate to suggest the Palace and the Estate were abandoned by the Louza-Canha/Sousa Botto families. The Estate was maintained but required a full restoration and without a Plan to return on the investment, a business decision was made to sell the Estate. The main concern was to secure a suitable buyer with the commitment and the financial stamina necessary to undertake the Restoration Project. The Quina Bankers' Family fitted the bill perfectly.

In 1966, Miguel Quina took steps to acquire the property, initiating a total restoration of the building, creating the Casa Agrícola da Quinta da Matta (Agricultural House of the Matta Estate). As part of this project, in 1967, CIMOBIM - Companhia Imobiliária e do Investimento SARL was authorized to proceed with the restoration and reintegration of the palace, under the direction of architects F.G. Berger.

However, the Portuguese Carnation Revolution in April 1974 and subsequent Communist counter-coup in 1975 derailed the ongoing efforts to complete the restoration of the palace. The whole Estate, which was legitimately in private ownership by the Quina Family, was forcibly and some might argue even 'unlawfully' expropriated and brutally 'nationalised' in 1975 without a 'day-after' plan. For several years, the beautiful, exquisite interiors served simply as warehouse space, causing considerable damage and erosion to the building.

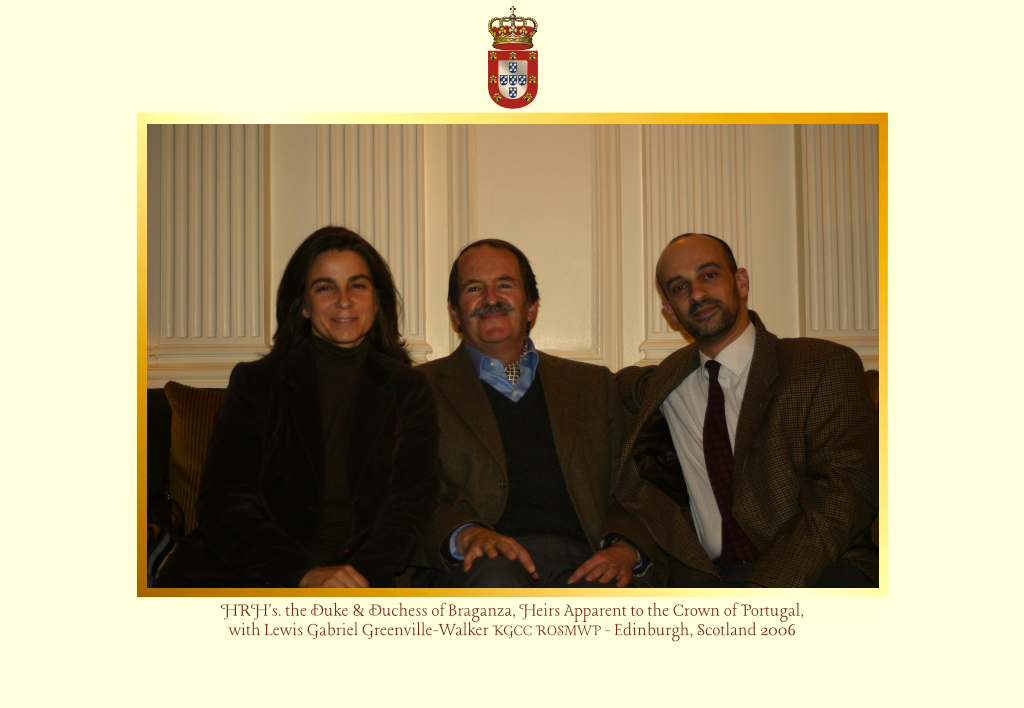
Cmdr. Lewis Gabriel Greenville-Walker (right), with HRH's the Dukes of Braganza, Heirs Apparent to the Crown of Portugal, in Edinburgh, Scotland 2006. Cmdr. Greenville-Walker (née de Lima -Villaverde) is the Grandson of Lady Gabriella (left) and was awarded in 2007 the grade of Knight Grand Cross Commander of the Royal Order of Saint Michael of the Wing (founded in 1143, by Afonso I (Henriques), first King of Portugal)

The Communist-controlled Authority halted the restoration in 1976 and, given the Estate had been expropriated there was no private investment from the last private owners (the Quina Family). The State would not invest either. Thus the bulk of the extensive disrepair started in 1975/1976. This is by no means an exception. In 1975/1976, many Stately Home Estates were expropriated and then abandoned, many did not survive the onslaught.

== Architecture ==
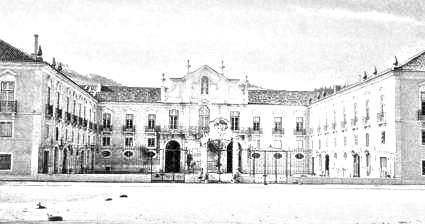
An engraving of the Quinta da Matta, showing front profile

The palace is located on the outskirts of the parish of Loures, on large tracts of forested lands that include a sizeable "frontyard". Entrance to the building is made by accessing the main gate, that includes a portico with the sculpted coat-of-arms of the Counts/Marquesses of Penfiel.

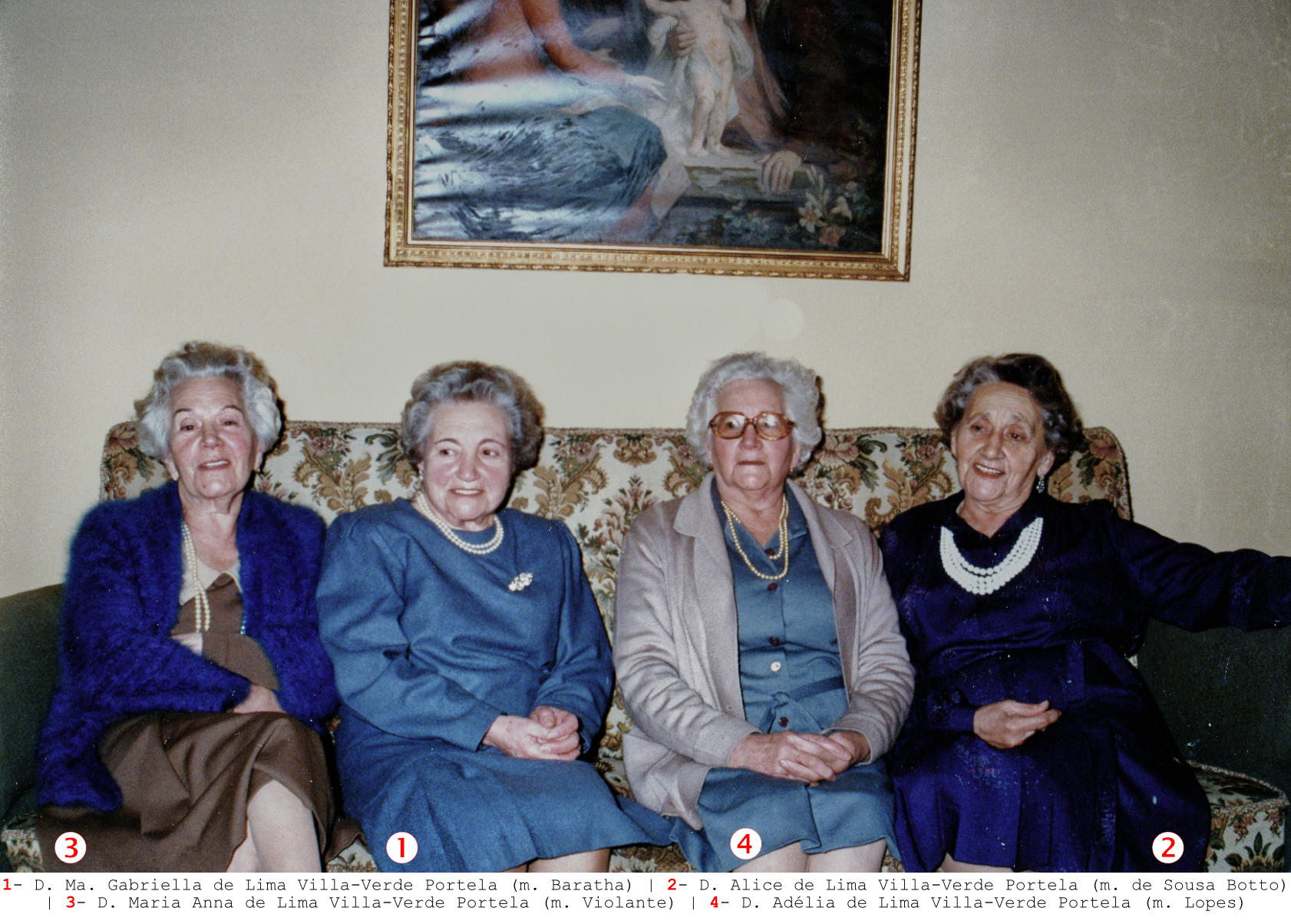
The Lima Villa-Verde Sisters, one of whom married into the Louza-Canha / Souza Botto, heirs to Correio-Mor Palace and Estate.

The layout of the building follows a U-shaped plan, comprising a central body that extends to the formal gardens in the rear (that also includes a tower in the southwest) and lateral wings (north and south).

It is a two-storey building, separated by friezes and an intermediary mezzanine, with tiled roof. Generally, the facades are broken by a regular fenestration: with a mixture of vertical rectangular and rounded doorways, in addition to ocula, on the first floor, square windows on the intermediary levels and rectangular windows that include pediments on the third floor, while a large pediment completes the second-floor of the central body. In this central wing, entry is made by two rounded doorways in the courtyard, flanked on either side by three ocula; the second floor continues with square windows, while the third floor includes tall rectangular windows and pediments. Above the first-floor rounded doors are three large windows (the largest being the central), that are surmounted by a curved pediment with the image of Nossa Senhora da Oliveira (Our Lady of the Olive Tree), and topped by pinnacles.

The first floor is taken up by agricultural dependencies: a wine cellar consisting of three naves, stables and a kitchen decorated in azulejo tile (showing an undetermined figure, meat and fish).

Access to the "noble's entrance" (on the second floor) occurred by way of a central staircase from the courtyard. At the top of this staircase is a fountain with "Samaritan" and sculpted figures on either side holding medallions with the busts of the property-owners.

The halls of the residence are decorated in azulejo, paintings and works in stucco. Such as the Central Hall, with azulejo depicting the life of man, in parallel with another depicting the construction of a ship. Other rooms of interest are the Sala dos Troféus (Trophy Hall), Sala das Estações (Hall of Seasons), Sala da Fauna (Hall of the Faun) and the Sala da Música (Hall of Music). The azulejos of the Sala de Caça (Hunting Room) are part of the "grand production" of the Joanino Baroque, or artistic period during the reign of King John V of Portugal, which were ultimately completed by Bartolomeu Antunes. From the beginning of the Rococo were the Sala das Estações, and Sala da Fama (both painted in blue), and the second group, consisting of the Sala das Trofeus and Sala de Música, which were completely later.

The chapel is a rectangular structure, with walls in stucco, retable with columns, and framed ceiling. Although the palace is an excellent example of the Baroque civil architectural style, owing to its grande dimensions and rich decorative interior, this chapel is counterpoint, seemingly confined and austere.

To the rear of the central body is garden of boxwood, with central lake and a few statutes. Also on the estate is a waterfall and tank, with azulejo panels showing the Metamorfoses de Ovídio (Metamorphoses).

== See also ==
- Palace of the Counts of Penafiel
- Luís Gomes da Mata Coronel
- Luís Gomes da Mata
- Duarte de Sousa da Mata Coutinho
