= Rúben Pinto =

Portuguese footballer

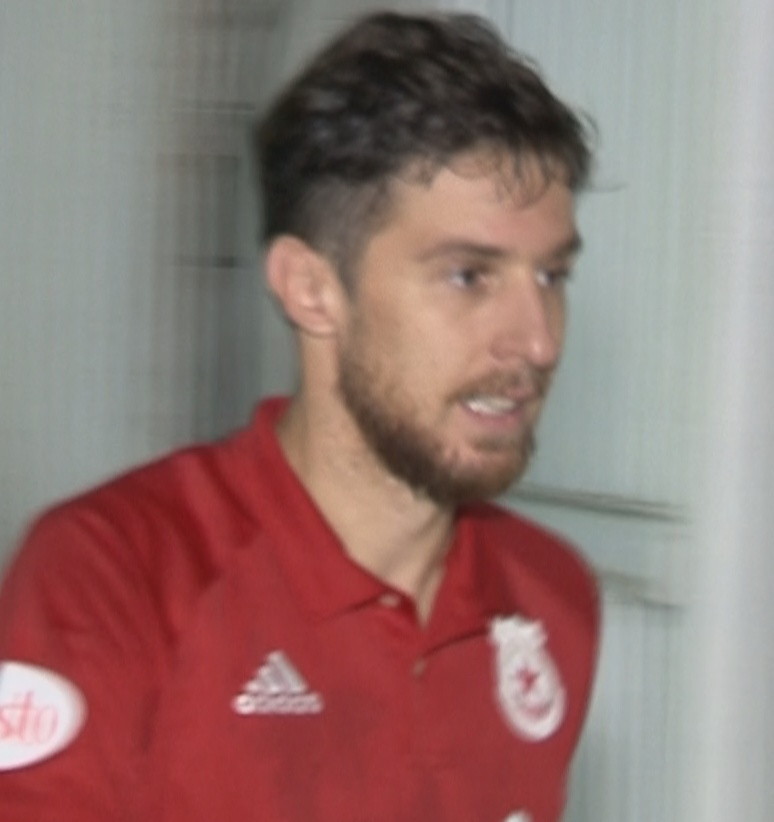
- Pinto in 2019

Personal information
- Full name: Rúben Rafael de Melo Silva Pinto
- Date of birth: 24 April 1992 (age 34)
- Place of birth: Odivelas, Portugal
- Height: 1.81 m (5 ft 11 in)
- Position: Midfielder

Team information
- Current team: Alcochetense

Youth career
- 2001–2004: Odivelas
- 2004–2011: Benfica

Senior career*
| Years | Team | Apps | (Gls) |
| 2011–2012 | Benfica | 0 | (0) |
| 2012–2015 | Benfica B | 59 | (10) |
| 2015 | → Paços Ferreira (loan) | 16 | (1) |
| 2015–2017 | Belenenses | 33 | (2) |
| 2016–2017 | → CSKA Sofia (loan) | 27 | (2) |
| 2017–2020 | CSKA Sofia | 79 | (7) |
| 2020–2024 | Fehérvár | 48 | (0) |
| 2024–2025 | Torreense | 19 | (0) |
| 2025–2026 | Mafra | 22 | (1) |
| 2026– | Alcochetense | 2 | (0) |

International career
| 2007–2008 | Portugal U16 | 7 | (0) |
| 2008–2009 | Portugal U17 | 17 | (2) |
| 2009–2010 | Portugal U18 | 7 | (3) |
| 2009–2011 | Portugal U19 | 26 | (6) |
| 2012 | Portugal U20 | 5 | (0) |
| 2013–2015 | Portugal U21 | 3 | (0) |
- * Club domestic league appearances and goals as of 09:21, 3 September 2026 (UTC)

Rúben Rafael de Melo Silva Pinto (born 24 April 1992) is a Portuguese professional footballer who plays as a midfielder for Campeonato de Portugal club Alcochetense.

== Club career ==
=== Benfica ===
Born in Odivelas, Lisbon metropolitan area, Pinto joined S.L. Benfica's youth system in 2004, aged 12. He was promoted to the first team for the 2011–12 season, being limited to a sole bench presence in that first year; in June 2011 he signed his first professional contract, running until 2015 with a €30 million clause.

Pinto made his senior debut in the 2012–13 campaign, competing with the reserves in the Segunda Liga. He made his first appearance in the competition on 28 April 2013, starting and playing 73 minutes in the 1–1 home draw against F.C. Arouca.

Pinto scored his first goal in the second division on 26 August 2013, in a 3–0 home win over Portimonense SC. On 25 January of the following year, he was again an unused substitute for the main squad, in a game against Gil Vicente F.C. in the group stage of the Taça da Liga.

On 7 January 2015, F.C. Paços de Ferreira signed Pinto on a loan deal until the end of the season. He scored his first goal in the Primeira Liga on 4 May, playing the full 90 minutes and helping to a 2–2 home draw with S.C. Braga.

=== Belenenses ===
On 18 June 2015, Pinto joined C.F. Os Belenenses on a four-year contract. He made his league debut on 15 August, scoring in the 3–3 home draw against Rio Ave FC.

Pinto played ten matches in the 2015–16 UEFA Europa League (qualifying rounds included, all starts), helping his team to the group phase.

=== CSKA Sofia ===
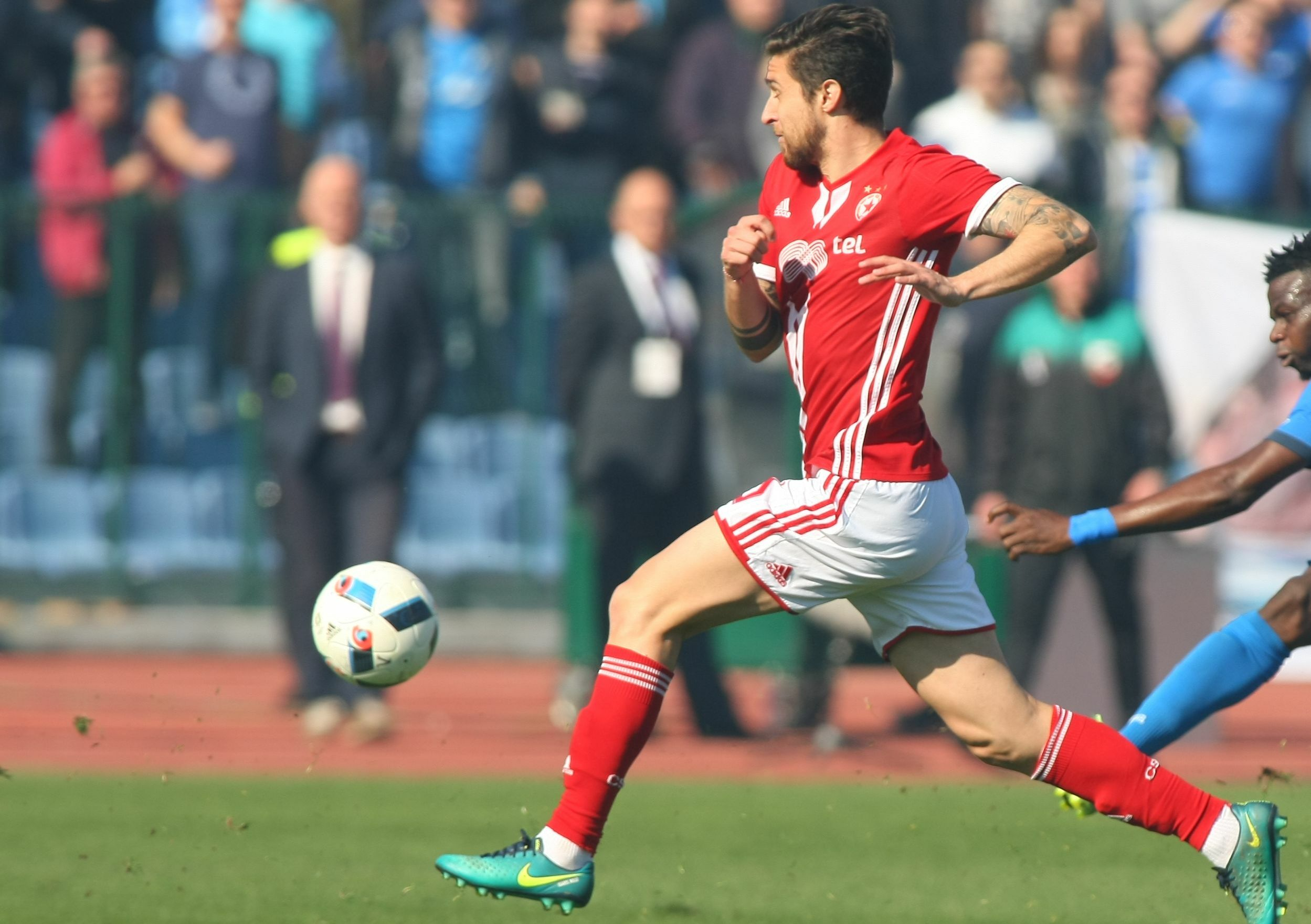
Pinto playing for CSKA Sofia in 2017

In the beginning of August 2016, Pinto joined PFC CSKA Sofia on loan with an option to make the move permanent afterwards. On 15 June 2017, the Bulgarian club activated the clause and he agreed to a three-year deal three days later.

In August 2019, Pinto saw himself removed from the first team (alongside Nikolay Bodurov) by manager Ljupko Petrović, reportedly for disciplinary reasons.

== International career ==
Pinto earned 65 caps for Portugal across six youth levels. On 2 June 2013, he made his debut with the under-21s, coming on midway through the second half of the 2–0 friendly defeat of Croatia.

== Career statistics ==
As of 15 May 2022

| Club | Season | Domestic League | | Domestic Cup | | League Cup | | Continental | | Total | |
| Club | Season | Apps | Goals | Apps | Goals | Apps | Goals | Apps | Goals | Apps | Goals |
|---|---|---|---|---|---|---|---|---|---|---|---|
| Benfica | 2011–12 | 0 | 0 | 0 | 0 | 0 | 0 | 0 | 0 | 0 | 0 |
| Benfica | Total | 0 | 0 | 0 | 0 | 0 | 0 | 0 | 0 | 0 | 0 |
| Benfica B | 2012–13 | 5 | 0 | — | | — | | — | | 5 | 0 |
| Benfica B | 2013–14 | 34 | 4 | — | | — | | — | | 34 | 4 |
| Benfica B | 2014–15 | 20 | 6 | — | | — | | — | | 20 | 6 |
| Benfica B | Total | 59 | 10 | — | | — | | — | | 59 | 10 |
| Paços Ferreira | 2014–15 | 16 | 1 | 0 | 0 | 0 | 0 | — | | 16 | 1 |
| Paços Ferreira | Total | 16 | 1 | 0 | 0 | 0 | 0 | — | | 16 | 1 |
| Belenenses | 2015–16 | 31 | 2 | 3 | 0 | 1 | 1 | 10 | 0 | 45 | 3 |
| Belenenses | 2016–17 | 2 | 0 | 0 | 0 | 0 | 0 | — | | 2 | 0 |
| Belenenses | Total | 33 | 2 | 3 | 0 | 1 | 1 | 10 | 0 | 47 | 3 |
| CSKA Sofia (loan) | 2016–17 | 27 | 2 | 1 | 0 | — | | — | | 28 | 2 |
| CSKA Sofia | 2017–18 | 27 | 4 | 4 | 0 | — | | — | | 31 | 4 |
| CSKA Sofia | 2018–19 | 33 | 2 | 4 | 3 | — | | 6 | 0 | 43 | 5 |
| CSKA Sofia | 2019–20 | 19 | 1 | 5 | 0 | — | | 2 | 0 | 26 | 1 |
| CSKA Sofia | Total | 106 | 9 | 14 | 3 | — | | 8 | 0 | 128 | 12 |
| Fehérvár | 2020–21 | 18 | 0 | 6 | 0 | — | | 0 | 0 | 24 | 0 |
| Fehérvár | 2021–22 | 9 | 0 | 2 | 0 | — | | 0 | 0 | 11 | 0 |
| Fehérvár | Total | 27 | 0 | 8 | 0 | — | | 0 | 0 | 35 | 0 |
| Career Total | | 241 | 22 | 25 | 3 | 1 | 1 | 18 | 0 | 285 | 26 |
