= Fernando Cabrita =

Portuguese footballer and manager

Personal information
- Full name: Fernando da Silva Cabrita
- Date of birth: 1 May 1923
- Place of birth: Lagos, Portugal
- Date of death: 22 September 2014 (aged 91)
- Place of death: Loures, Portugal
- Position: Forward

Youth career
- 1940–1942: Esperança Lagos

Senior career*
Years	Team	Apps	(Gls)
1942–1951	Olhanense	170	(82)
1951–1953	Angers	56	(5)
1953–1957	Covilhã	125	(6)
1959–1960	Portimonense (player-coach)		
Total		351	(93)

International career
1945–1957	Portugal	7	(1)

Managerial career
- 1954–1958: Unhais Serra
- 1959–1960: Portimonense
- 1967–1968: Benfica (caretaker)
- 1970–1972: União Tomar
- 1973–1974: Benfica
- 1977–1979: Beira-Mar
- 1980: Rio Ave
- 1981: Rio Ave
- 1981–1982: Académico Viseu
- 1983–1984: Portugal
- 1985–1986: Penafiel
- 1986–1987: Estrela Amadora
- 1987–1988: Raja Casablanca
- 1988–1989: Académico Viseu
- 1990–1991: Raja Casablanca
- 1992: Esperança Lagos
- * Club domestic league appearances and goals

Fernando da Silva Cabrita OIH (1 May 1923 – 22 September 2014) was a Portuguese football forward and manager.

He amassed Primeira Liga totals of 295 games and 88 goals over the course of 14 seasons, in representation of Olhanense and Covilhã. Subsequently, he went on to have a coaching career that lasted more than two decades, and included spells with Benfica and the Portugal national team.

== Club career ==
Born in Lagos, Algarve, Cabrita played 14 of his 18 years as a senior in his country's top division, starting out at Olhanense. In the 1943–44 season, he scored a career-best 20 goals in only 18 games to help his team to the fifth position out of ten clubs. Cabrita also represented Angers (France, second level), Covilhã and Portimonense, before retiring in 1960 at the age of 37.

== International career ==
He gained seven caps for Portugal in twelve years, making his debut on 11 March 1945 in a 2–2 friendly draw against Spain and netting his only goal in his next appearance, a 1–5 away loss to the same opponent for the 1950 FIFA World Cup qualifiers, on 2 April 1950.

== Managerial career ==
Cabrita started working as a coach, as he was still playing with Portimonense in 1959. His first full-time stop at the professional level came during the 1967–68 campaign, when he acted as interim at Benfica and led the club to the national championship, before Otto Glória took over. In the Portuguese top flight he was also in charge of Tomar, Beira-Mar, Rio Ave, Academico de Viseu and Penafiel.

Cabrita served as Portugal's manager during nine matches starting in 1983, after the resignation of Glória. He led a technical commission with three other members – José Augusto, António Morais and Toni – and coached the national side to the semi-finals at UEFA Euro 1984, where they lost 2–3 to France in extra time.

== Death ==
Cabrita died on 22 September 2014 due to respiratory failure, at the Hospital Beatriz Ângelo in Loures, Lisbon. He was 91 years old.

== Honours ==
Raja Casablanca

- Botola: 1988

=== Individual ===
==== Orders ====
- Commander of the Order of Prince Henry
