= Famões =

- Civil parish
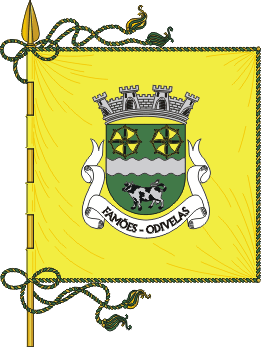
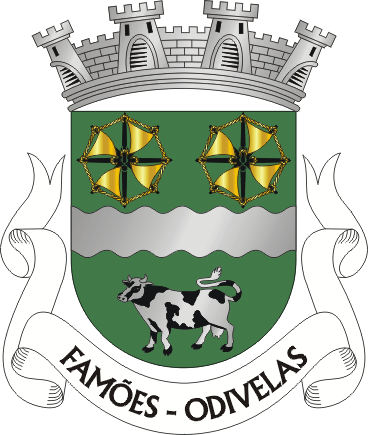
- Flag Coat of arms

- Location in Portugal
- Coordinates: 38.790°N 9.211°W
- Country: Portugal
- Region: Lisbon
- Metropolitan area: Lisbon
- District: Lisbon
- Municipality: Odivelas
- Established: Parish: 25 August 1989; Civil parish: 19 November 1998
- Disbanded: 2013
- Time zone: UTC+00:00 (WET)
  - Summer (DST): UTC+01:00 (WEST)
- Postal code: 1685-923
- Area code: 219
- Patron: Nossa Senhora do Rosário

Famões is a former civil parish in the municipality of Odivelas, Portugal. In 2013, the parish merged into the new parish Pontinha e Famões. Administratively, the parish of Famões was de-annexed from the neighboring parish of Odivelas on 25 August 1989, and later elevated to the status of town, on 19 April 2001.

Today, it continues to be part of the municipality of Odivelas, after existing as a parish in the municipality of Loures (it was annexed to Odivelas on 19 November 1998). Ecclesiastically, the religious parish of Famões belongs to the vicarage of Loures-Odivelas, in the Diocese of Lisbon, its organ is Nossa Senhora do Rosário (Our Lady of the Rosary).

== History ==
Human settlement in Famões dates back to the pre-history, with vestiges of human occupation originating in the 5th century BC. Around 1912, investigator Vergílio Correia discovered two archaeological sites, one of which included lands in Alvitos (today little remains). In the 1920s, Francisco Ribeiro, an archaeological buff, photographed and excavated four dolmens that he discovered in Trigaches. These sites were cataloged and studied in the 1960s by specialist Octávio da Veiga Ferreira and Vera Leisner, who encountered numerous megalithic remnants in an area they named the Trigaches necropolis. Unfortunately, through indifference, the only prehistoric monuments from these excavations were gathered and stored in the Museu dos Serviços Geológicos (Geologic Service Museum) in Lisbon. The origin of the name is believed to be related to the lemon trees in the region, which, due to their quality and popularity, gave the name to the region of the famous lemons, with time the name was shortened to Famões (Famous + Lemons). During the 18th century, Famões was a small agricultural settlement (like many in the same region), and mentioned in the tenure 1457 holdings of the Chancellor to King Afonso V. During this period Famõe, then known as Casal de Pão, pertained to the Gafaria de Almada (a leper's hospital) and administered by the cooper Lopo Fernandes, who donated it to Beatriz Lourenço, residents in Lisbon. Following the 18th century, the name of Famões began appearing in the official documents. In the Chorographia of Father António de Carvalho (1712), Famões appeared as a locality, an agglomerated area of few rural houses; in the Memórias Paroquiais of 1758, the parish included 44 residents. From the registry Décima da Cidade (a fiscal document of the period), Famões was under the stewardship of Manuel Francisco Camello, who had fiscal responsibilities to the Misericórdia de Almada, an institution to which the leper's hospital was absorbed.
