= Roman villa of Almoinhas =

Roman villa in the civil parish of Loures, Lisbon, Portugal

- Interactive map of Roman villa of Almoinhas
- 38°49′31.234″N 9°09′55.4″W
- Type: Ruins
- Location: Lisbon, Greater Lisbon, Lisbon, Portugal

Site notes
- Elevation: 112 m (367 ft)
- Length: 560.55 m (1,839.1 ft)
- Width: 597.81 m (1,961.3 ft)
- Archaeologists: unknown
- Owner: Portuguese Republic
- Public access: Public

The Roman villa of Almoinhas is a Roman villa in the civil parish of Loures, municipality of Loures, dating to the first to fifth century AD.

== History ==
The villa was constructed during the period of Roman occupation of the Iberian Peninsula in the first centuries of the new millennium.

The discovery of the villa of Almoinhas dates back to 1990, when the first materials were discovered onsite. There discovery developed from the construction of new access-way to a LIDL supermarket in Loures; the resulting excavation was accompanied by LIDL, which was honoured by the local municipal authority in the presentation of a formal report on the excavation.

Excavations in the location occurred in 1995, where archaeologists discovered burial tombs, incendiary remnants, several walls, salting tanks, dump and structures in a gully. These also included a capital, various Roman coins and ceramic tiles within an amphora, which were collected and placed on display in the Municipal Museum of Loures.

In October 2004, the archaeological company ERA, completed an intervention, and discovered other remnants, such as a necropolis, fossas, canalization, three oven tanks, and indications of a residential zone.

On 30 August 2006, in the Palace of the Marquesses of Praia and Monforte, the conclusions relative to the excavations were presented by Fernando Real, director of the Instituto Português de Arqueologia (IPA), and accompanied by the municipal executive.
