= Duarte de Sousa da Mata Coutinho =

Duarte da Mata
- High-Courier of the Kingdom of Portugal
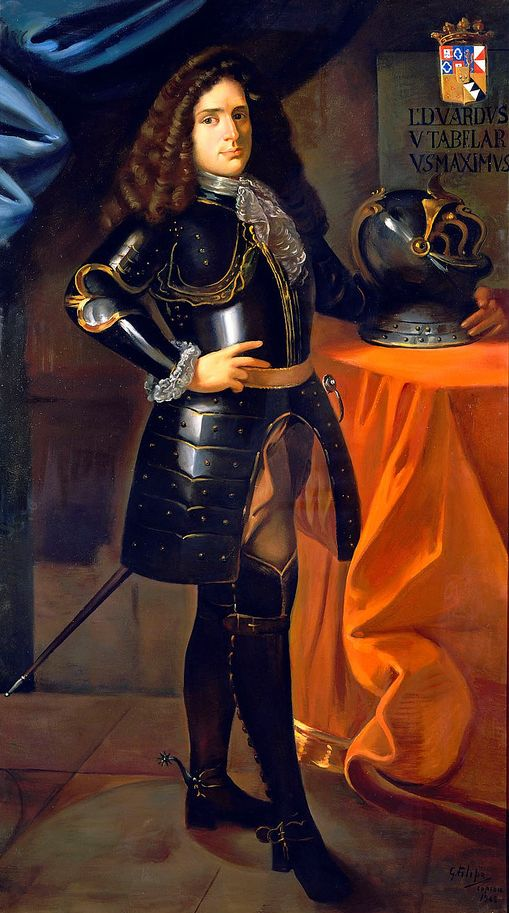

High-Courier of the Kingdom of Portugal
- Successor: Luís Vitório de Sousa da Mata Coutinho
- Full name: Duarte de Sousa da Mata Coutinho
- Noble family: da Mata
- Issue: Luís Vitório de Sousa da Mata Coutinho
- Occupation: High Courier of the Kingdom

Duarte de Sousa da Mata Coutinho (1674 to 1696) was a Portuguese nobleman. He was the 8th High-Courier (Chief Post-Master) of the Kingdom of Portugal.

He lived in the Palácio do Correio-Mor (Palace of the Post Office) in Lisbon and died there.

== See also ==
- Luís Gomes da Mata Coronel
- Luís Gomes da Mata
- Correio-Mor Palace
- Palace of the Counts of Penafiel
