= Pontinha e Famões =

- Civil parish
- Location in Portugal
- Coordinates: 38.764°N 9.200°W
- Country: Portugal
- Region: Lisbon
- Metropolitan area: Lisbon
- District: Lisbon
- Municipality: Odivelas

Area
  - Total: 9.22 km^{2} (3.56 sq mi)

Population (2011)
  - Total: 34,143
  - Density: 3,700/km^{2} (9,600/sq mi)
- Time zone: UTC+00:00 (WET)
  - Summer (DST): UTC+01:00 (WEST)

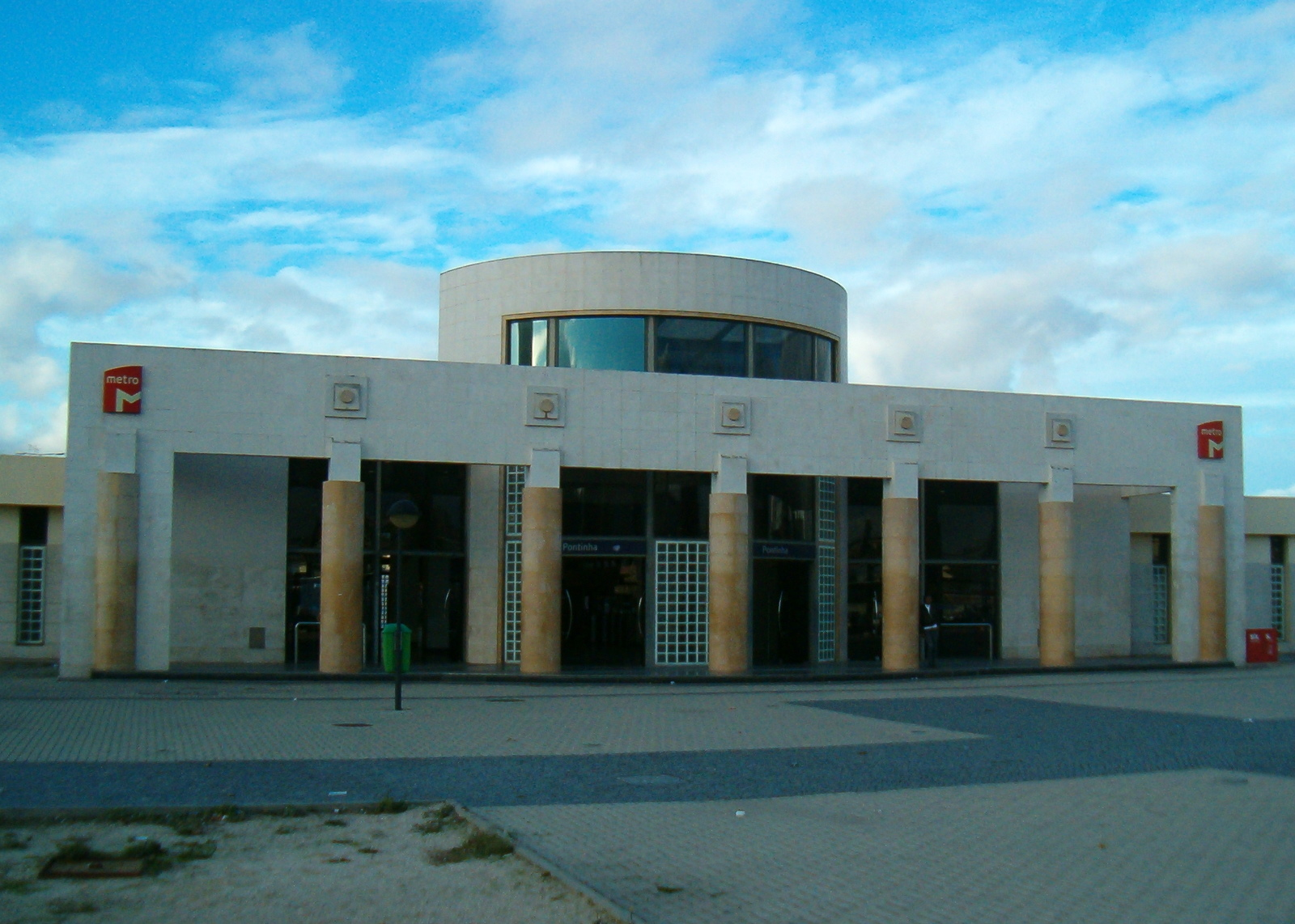
Pontinha metro station in Lisbon

Pontinha e Famões is a civil parish in the municipality of Odivelas, Portugal. It was formed in 2013 by the merger of the former parishes Pontinha and Famões. The population in 2011 was 34,143, in an area of 9.22 km².
