= Luís Gomes da Mata =

Luís da Mata
- High-Courier of the Kingdom of Portugal
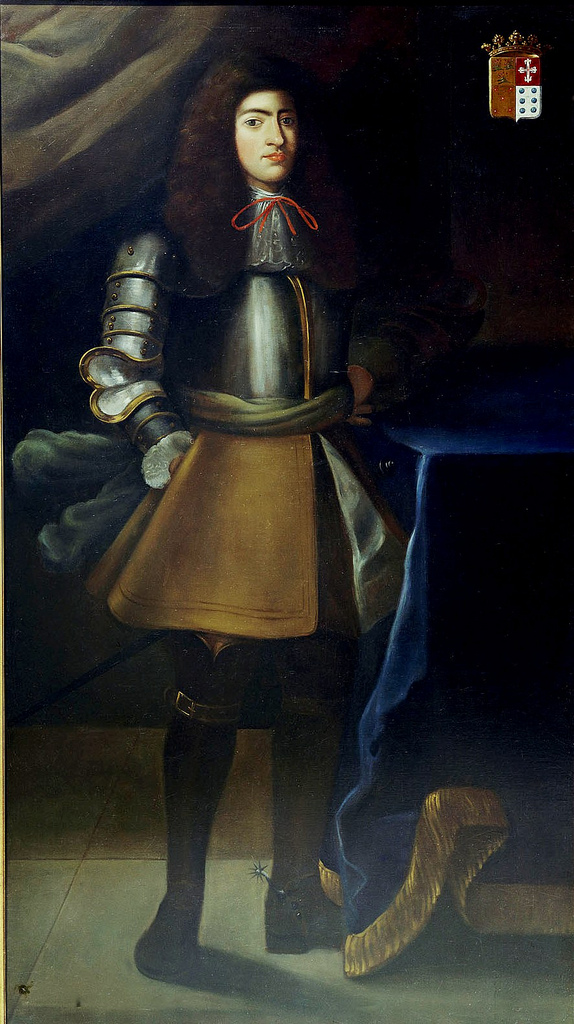

High-Courier of the Kingdom of Portugal
- Successor: Duarte de Sousa da Mata Coutinho
- Full name: Luís Gomes da Mata
- Noble family: da Mata
- Issue: Duarte de Sousa da Mata Coutinho
- Occupation: High Courier of the Kingdom

Luís Gomes da Mata was a Portuguese nobleman and the 7th High-Courier of the Kingdom of Portugal.

== See also ==
- Luís Gomes da Mata Coronel
- Duarte de Sousa da Mata Coutinho
- Correio-Mor Palace
- Palace of the Counts of Penafiel
