= Ramada (Odivelas) =

- Civil parish
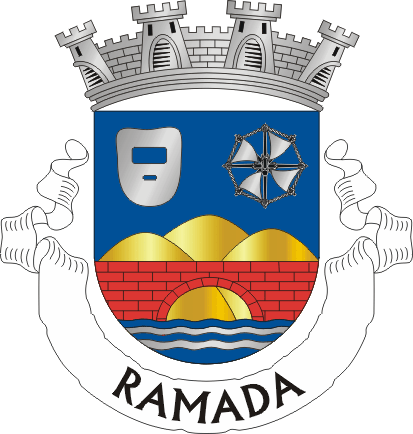
- Coat of arms

- Location in Portugal
- Coordinates: 38.804°N 9.191°W
- Country: Portugal
- Region: Lisbon
- Metropolitan area: Lisbon
- District: Lisbon
- Municipality: Odivelas
- Disbanded: 2013

Area
  - Total: 3.86 km^{2} (1.49 sq mi)

Population (2001)
  - Total: 15,770
  - Density: 4,100/km^{2} (11,000/sq mi)
- Time zone: UTC+00:00 (WET)
  - Summer (DST): UTC+01:00 (WEST)

Ramada (Portuguese pronunciation: [ʁɐˈmaðɐ]) is a former civil parish in the municipality of Odivelas, Portugal. In 2013, the parish merged into the new parish Ramada e Caneças. It covers an area of 3.86 km² and had a population of 15,770 as of 2001.
