= Luís Gomes da Mata Coronel =

Portuguese nobleman

Luís da Mata

High-Courier of the Kingdom of Portugal
- Successor: Antônio Gomes da Mata Coronel
- Full name: Luís Gomes da Mata Coronel
- Noble family: da Mata
- Issue: Antônio Gomes da Mata Coronel
- Occupation: High Courier of the Kingdom

Luís Gomes da Mata Coronel was a Portuguese nobleman and the 5th High-Courier of the Kingdom of Portugal. was a New Christian merchant and banker from Elvas who lived in Lisbon. He was a descendant of Don Abraham Senior, alias Fernão Perez Coronel. In 1606, Luís Gomes received a letter from King Filipe II recognising him as a "fidalgo da Casa Real" (a nobleman) with a manor, the Quinta da Mata das Flores, a villa in Loures, near Lisbon. Then, he adopted the "da Mata" surname and left the Converso-related Coronel family name. In the same year of 1606, Luís Gomes da Mata was also awarded the exemption from the payment of the "finta" (tax) charged to New Christians.

== See also ==
- Luís Gomes da Mata
- Duarte de Sousa da Mata Coutinho
- Correio-Mor Palace
- Palace of the Counts of Penafiel
