= Loures (parish) =

- Civil parish
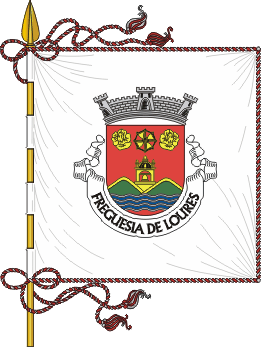
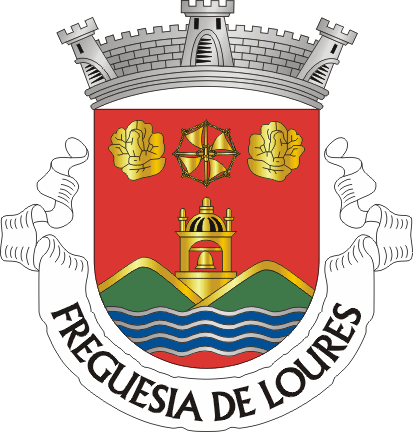
- Flag Coat of arms

- Location in Portugal
- Coordinates: 38.829°N 9.169°W
- Country: Portugal
- Region: Lisbon
- Metropolitan area: Lisbon
- District: Lisbon
- Municipality: Loures

Area
  - Total: 32.82 km^{2} (12.67 sq mi)

Population (2011)
  - Total: 26,769
  - Density: 820/km^{2} (2,100/sq mi)
- Time zone: UTC+00:00 (WET)
  - Summer (DST): UTC+01:00 (WEST)
- Postal code: 2670
- Area code: 219
- Patron: Nossa Senhora da Saúde
- Website: http://www.jf-loures.pt/

Loures is a civil parish in the municipality of Loures, Portugal. It is an urban parish, part of the city of Loures. The population in 2011 was 26,769, in an area of 32.82 km^{2}.

== History ==
Population of Loures (1862 - 2011)
Year	Pop.	±%
1862	3,574	—
1864	4,515	+26.3%
1890	4,791	+6.1%
1900	4,789	−0.0%
1911	5,156	+7.7%
1920	4,355	−15.5%
1930	4,698	+7.9%
1991	19,252	+309.8%
2001	24,237	+25.9%
2011	26,769	+10.4%

The parish of Loures was first mentioned in 1118, and again in 1191, along with the parishes of Unhose and Sacavém. From this administrative entity, the territories of the civil parish of Póvoa de Santo Adrião (known as Póvoa de Loures), during the middle of the 17th century, and Caneças in 1915 were cleaved from the territory. In 1989 the civil parish of Santo António dos Cavaleiros was de-annexed from Loures.

== Geography ==
The civil parish of Loures, located in the extreme western part of the municipality, is bordered by the neighbouring civil parishes of Fanhões, Santo António dos Cavaleiros e Frielas, Lousa, Santo Antão e São Julião do Tojal and the municipalities of Mafra, Odivelas (the parish of Ramada e Caneças) and Sintra (Almargem do Bispo, Pêro Pinheiro e Montelavar).

It includes several agglomerations and localities dispersed beyond the main settlement; these include: A-dos-Calvos, A-dos-Cãos, Barro, Bolores, Botica, Fanqueiro, Fonte Santa, Guerreiros, Infantado, Lagariça, Loures, Mealhada, Migarrinhos, Moninhos, Montemor, Murteira, Pai Joanes, Palhais, Pinheiro de Loures, Ponte de Lousa (which is shared with the neighbouring parish of Lousa), Quinta Nova de São Roque, São Sebastião de Guerreiros, Sete Casas, Tojalinho and Torre Trotes.
