= Paulo Santos (Portuguese footballer) =

Portuguese footballer

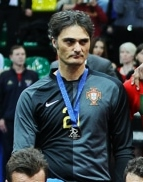

Personal information
- Full name: Paulo Jorge da Silva dos Santos
- Date of birth: 11 December 1972 (age 53)
- Place of birth: Odivelas, Portugal
- Height: 1.84 m (6 ft 0 in)
- Position: Goalkeeper

Youth career
- 1984–1989: Sporting CP
- 1989–1991: Benfica

Senior career*
Years	Team	Apps	(Gls)
1991–1992	Mirense	26	(0)
1992–1993	Olivais Moscavide	33	(0)
1993–1994	Benfica	1	(0)
1994–1995	Penafiel	19	(0)
1995–1998	Estrela Amadora	59	(0)
1998–2001	Alverca	67	(0)
2001–2005	Porto	8	(0)
2003	→ Varzim (loan)	2	(0)
2003–2004	Porto B	3	(0)
2004–2005	→ Braga (loan)	33	(0)
2005–2008	Braga	75	(0)
2009–2010	Estoril	26	(0)
2010–2012	Rio Ave	30	(0)
Total		382	(0)

International career
1994	Portugal U21	1	(0)
2005	Portugal	1	(0)
Medal record
Men's football
Representing Portugal
UEFA European Under-21 Championship
Runner-up	1994 France
FIFA U-17 World Cup
Third place	1989 Scotland
UEFA European Under-17 Championship
Winner	1989 Denmark
- * Club domestic league appearances and goals

Paulo Jorge da Silva dos Santos (born 11 December 1972) is a Portuguese former professional footballer who played as a goalkeeper.

He appeared in 275 Primeira Liga matches over 14 seasons, representing in the competition Benfica, Estrela da Amadora, Alverca, Porto, Varzim, Braga and Rio Ave.

Santos was part of the Portugal squad at the 2006 World Cup.

== Club career ==
Born in Odivelas, Lisbon metropolitan area, Santos began his football career at age 11 at Sporting CP, and made his debut in the Primeira Liga in the 1993–94 season, winning the league with capital neighbours S.L. Benfica by playing one minute in the last game. After successful stints with C.F. Estrela da Amadora and F.C. Alverca, he went on to represent FC Porto with no significant impact.

Santos joined S.C. Braga in summer 2005 after serving a loan stint with the same team the previous campaign. During that first year – with the Minho side finishing fourth – when Andrés Madrid deflected the ball in for an own goal, he was beaten for the first time in 595 minutes, just 40 short of the record set by Benfica's Manuel Bento; in the only other time he had conceded until that point, Red Star Belgrade claimed the away goal that ended the Portuguese's campaign in the UEFA Cup at the first round for the second year running.

In 2007–08, mainly due to injury problems, Santos only appeared in 12 league matches. He was released in December 2008 following a contract dispute, although he had a link running until June 2009.

Midway through 2008–09, Santos spent time training with lowly Odivelas F.C. in the third division in order to stay fit. In July he "upgraded" to the second with G.D. Estoril Praia, appearing regularly to help his team to retain their league status.

On 12 July 2010, at nearly 38, Santos moved to top-tier club Rio Ave FC, filling the gap left by the departure of starter Carlos Fernandes, who had moved to Bucaspor in Turkey. He retired two years later, having been first choice in his debut campaign.

== International career ==
Santos won one cap for the Portugal national team, appearing in a friendly with Northern Ireland on 15 November 2005 (1–1 in Belfast). He was called up to the 2006 FIFA World Cup tournament, as a late replacement for the injured Bruno Vale.

During the group stage game against Guinea for the 1989 FIFA U-16 World Championship, Santos dropped his shorts to the crowd after being subjected to insults, being immediately suspended from the tournament and later banned by FIFA for one year.

== Post-retirement ==
After retiring, Santos worked in the area of food supplements.

He became goalkeeping coach at Sepahan FC in 2022, later staying at Bodrum FK from 2025 to 2026.

== Honours ==
Benfica

- Primeira Liga: 1993–94

Portugal

- UEFA European Under-16 Championship: 1989

Individual

- Primeira Liga Goalkeeper of the Year: 2006

Orders

- Medal of Merit, Order of the Immaculate Conception of Vila Viçosa (House of Braganza)
