= Caneças =

Coordinates: 38°49′N 9°14′W

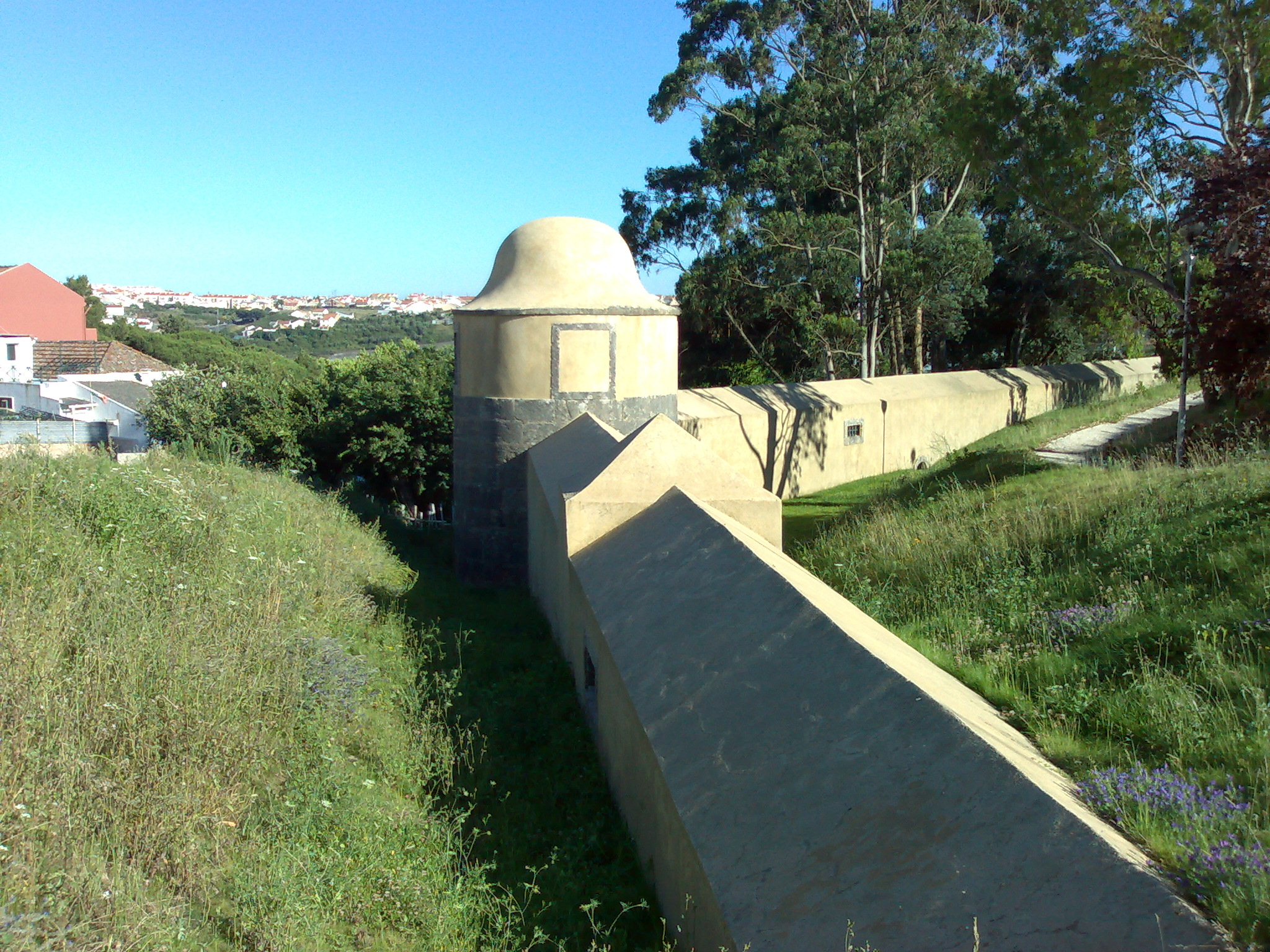
An aqueduct in Caneças

Caneças is a former civil parish in the municipality of Odivelas, Portugal. In 2013, the parish merged into the new parish Ramada e Caneças. It is a suburb of the Greater Lisbon region.
