= Ramada e Caneças =

- Civil parish
- Location in Portugal
- Coordinates: 38.804°N 9.191°W
- Country: Portugal
- Region: Lisbon
- Metropolitan area: Lisbon
- District: Lisbon
- Municipality: Odivelas

Area
  - Total: 9.66 km^{2} (3.73 sq mi)

Population (2011)
  - Total: 32,581
  - Density: 3,400/km^{2} (8,700/sq mi)
- Time zone: UTC+00:00 (WET)
  - Summer (DST): UTC+01:00 (WEST)

Ramada e Caneças is a civil parish in the municipality of Odivelas, Portugal. It was formed in 2013 by the merger of the former parishes Ramada and Caneças. The population in 2011 was 32,581, in an area of 9.66 km^{2}.
