= Luis Gómez =

Luis Gómez may refer to:

- Luis Gómez (footballer, born 1972), Ecuadorian footballer
- Luis Gómez (footballer, born 2007), Mexican footballer
- Luis Gómez (baseball) (born 1951), retired baseball player from Mexico
- Luis Gómez (tennis) (born 1992), Panamanian tennis player
- Luis Gómez-Montejano (1922–2017), president of Real Madrid
- Luis Moises Gomez (c. 1660–1740), Sephardic Jewish merchant and trader
- Luis Arce Gómez (born 1938), Bolivian military officer
- Luis Eduardo Gómez (1941–2011), Colombian journalist
- Luis Gómez Gómez (born 1980), Mexican politician
- Luis Hernando Gómez (born 1958), Colombian drug trafficker
