= Odivelas =

- Municipality
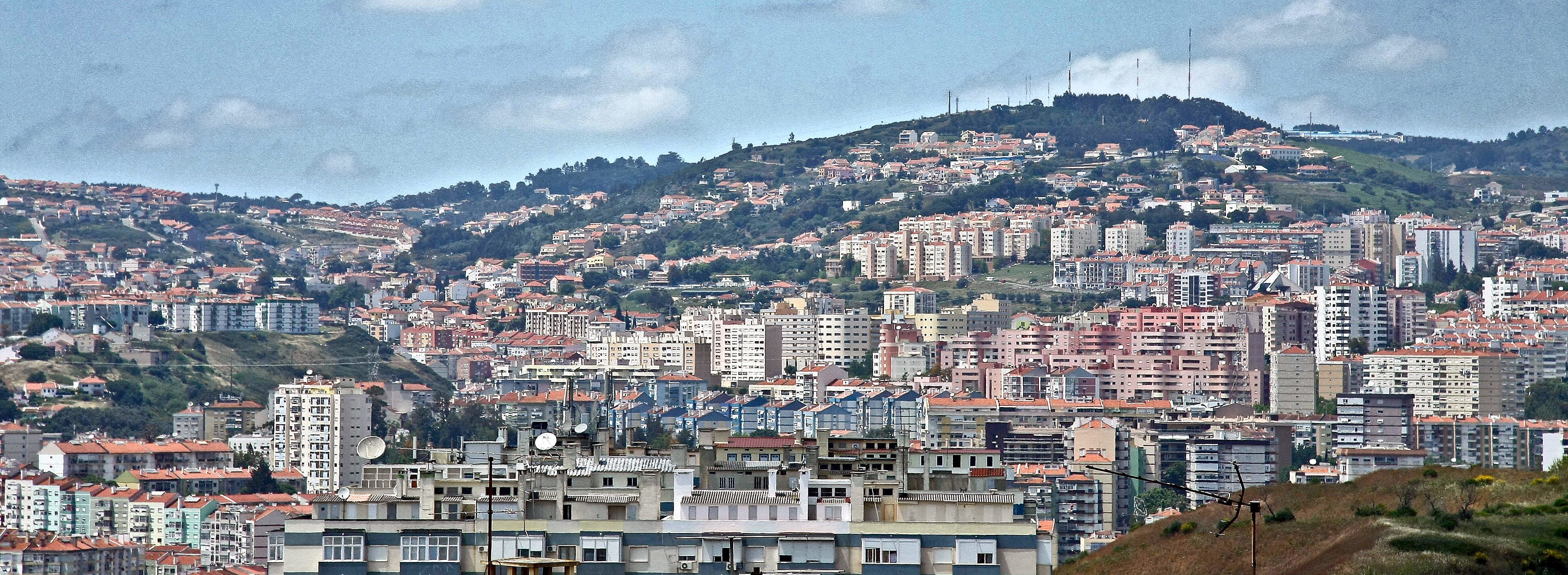
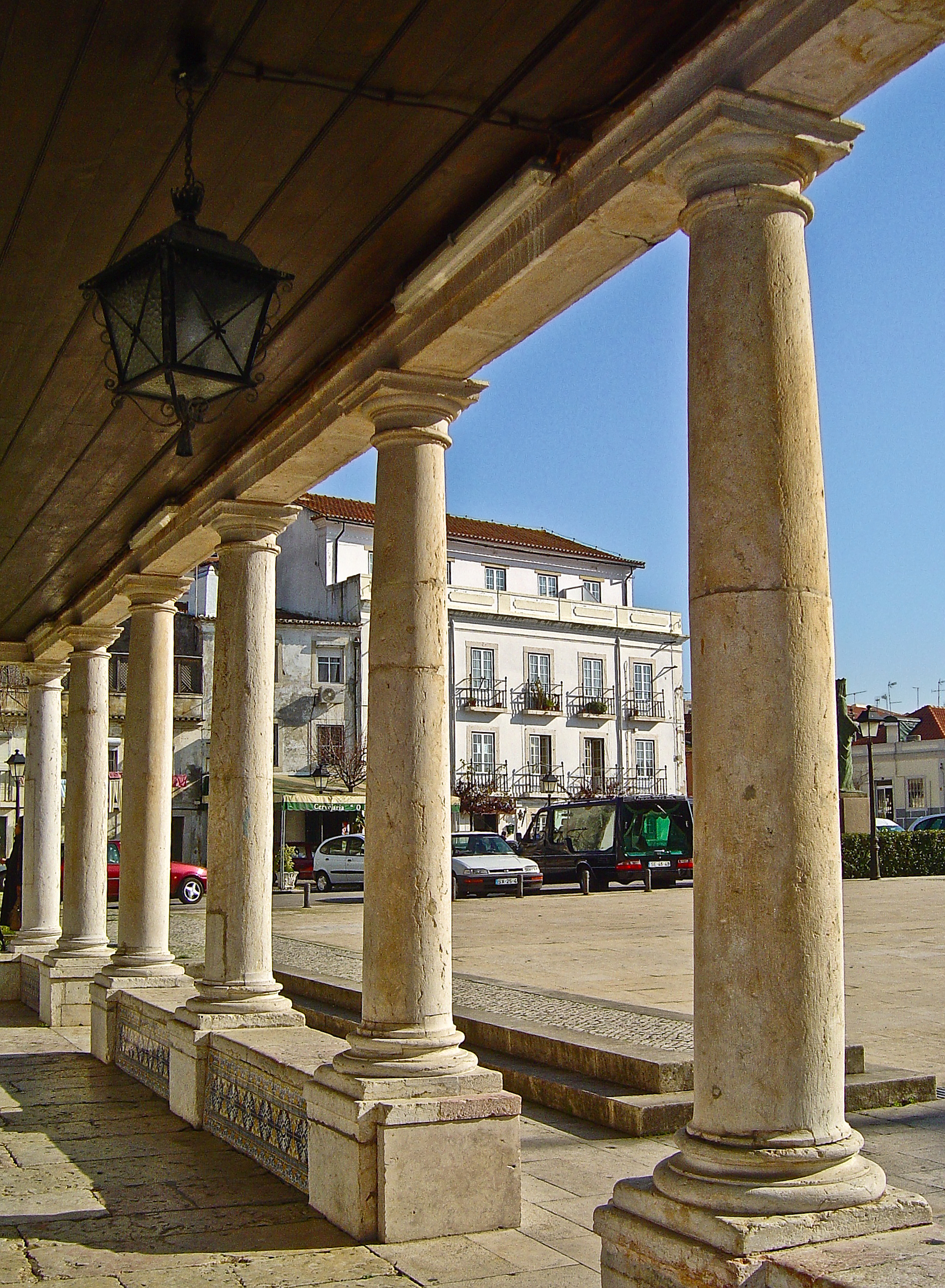
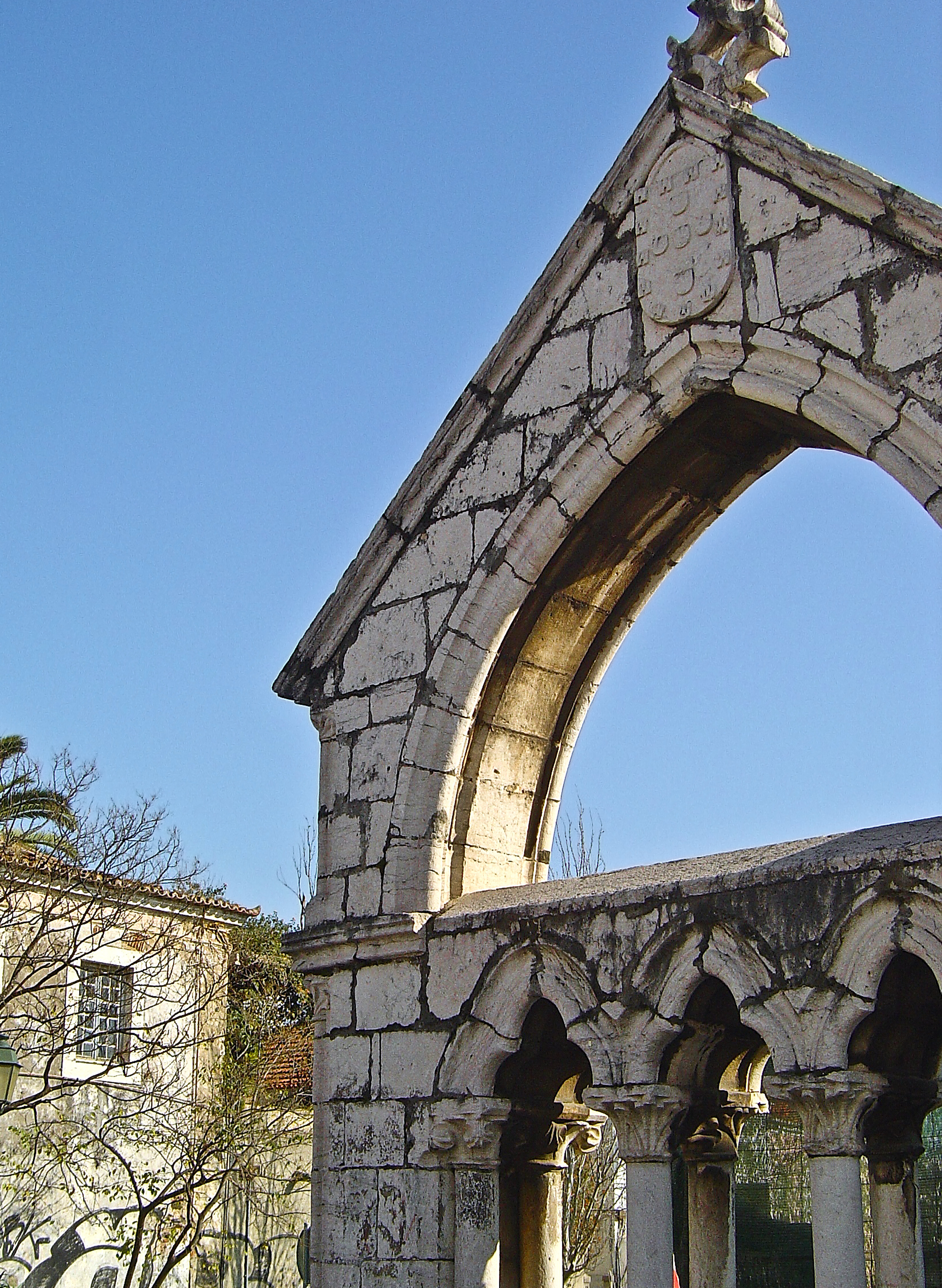
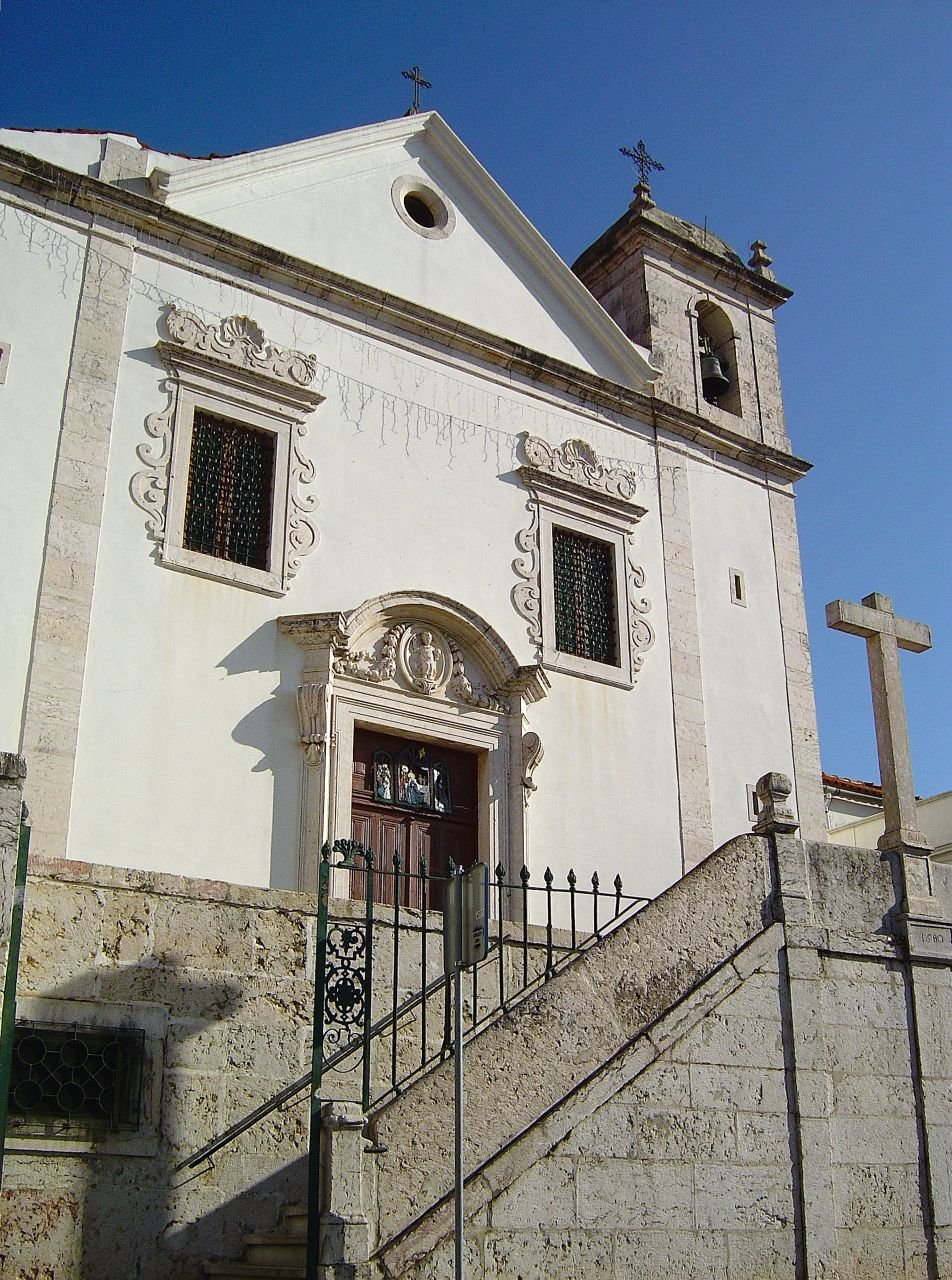
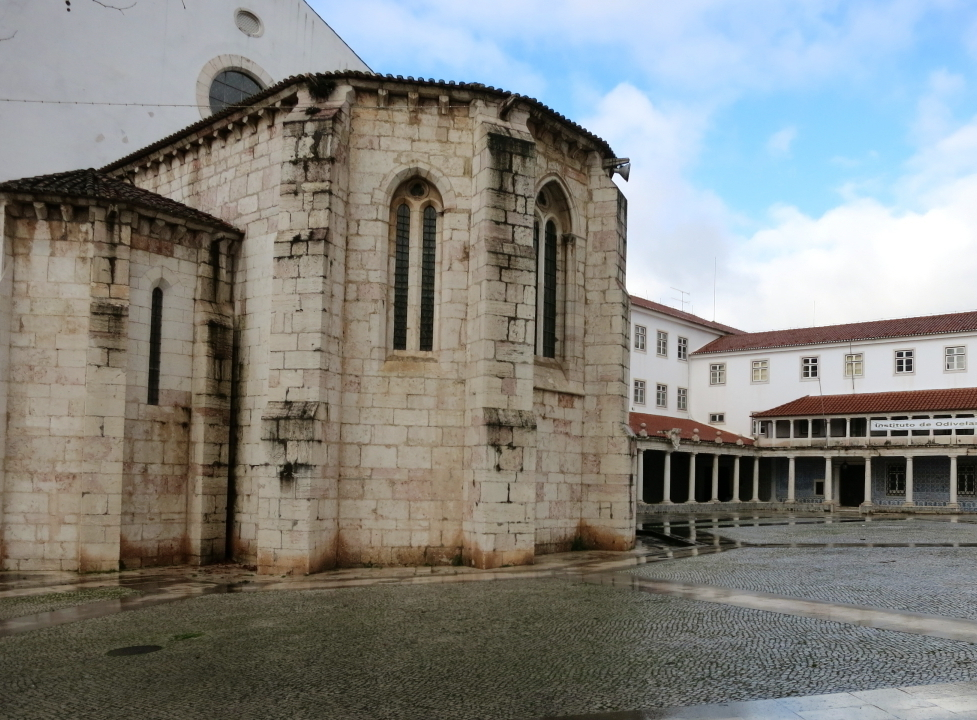
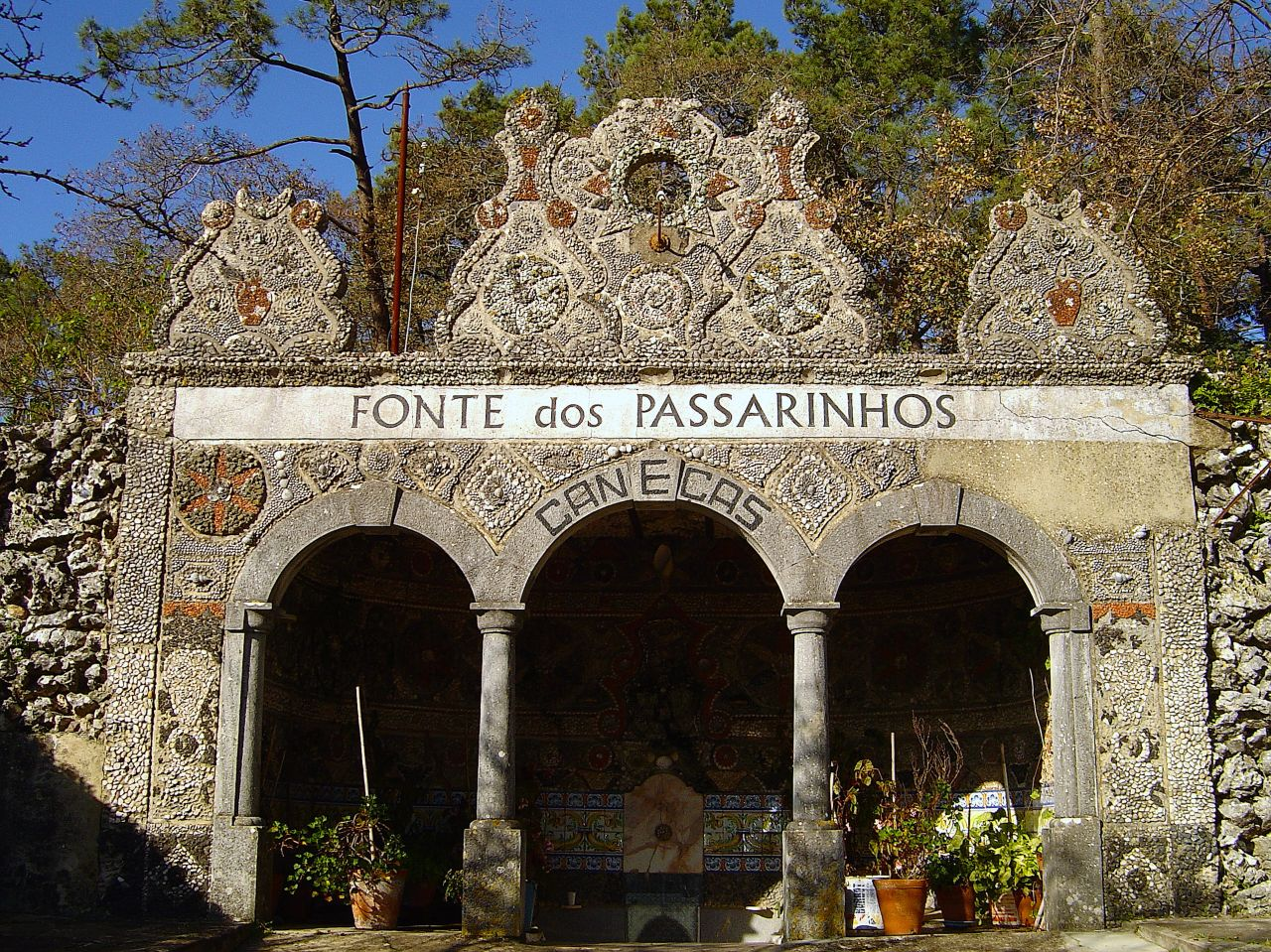

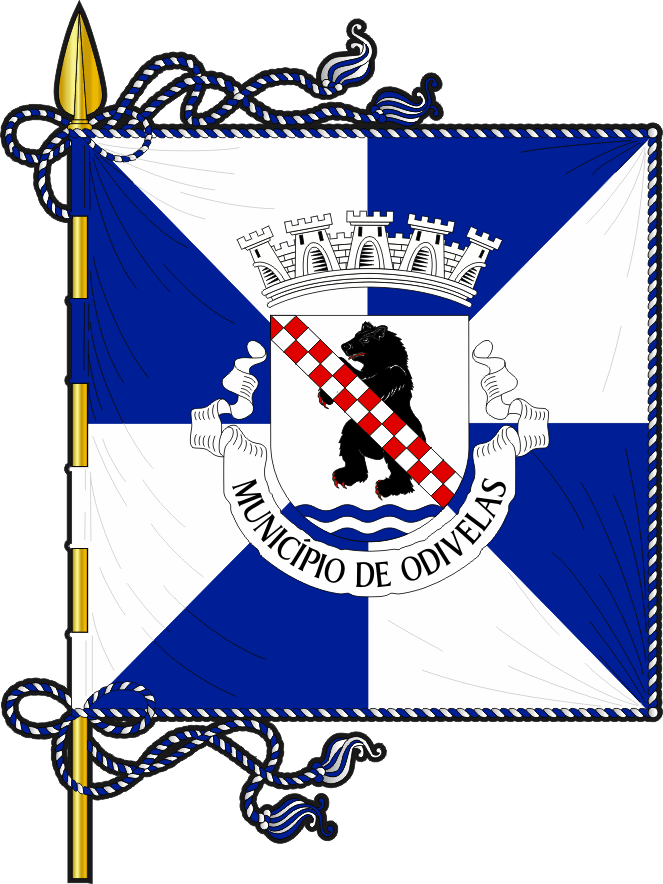
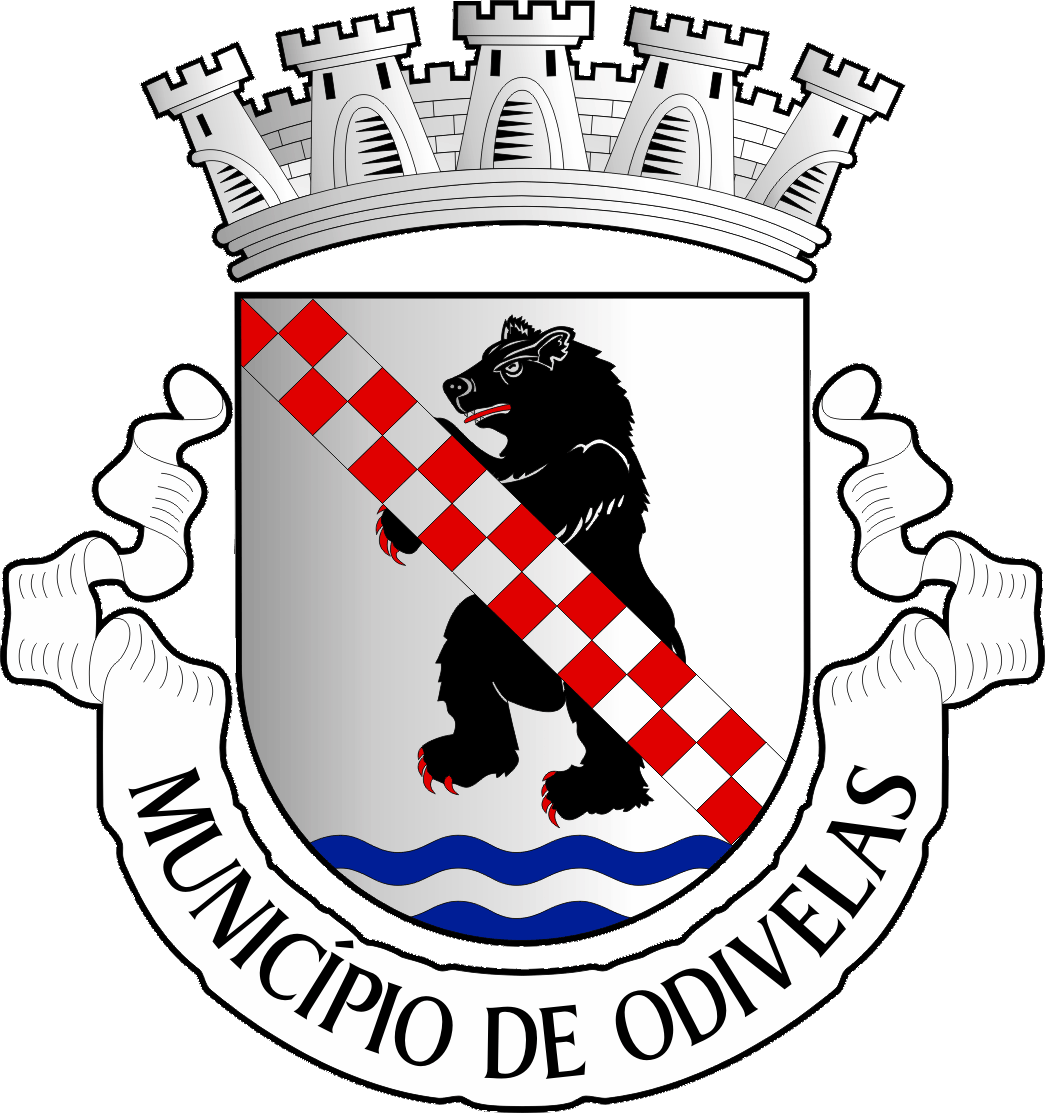
- Flag Coat of arms
- Interactive map of Odivelas
- Coordinates: 38°47′25″N 9°10′47″W
- Country: Portugal
- Region: Lisbon
- Metropolitan area: Lisbon
- District: Lisbon
- Parishes: 4

Government
  - President: Hugo Martins (PS)

Area
  - Total: 26.54 km^{2} (10.25 sq mi)
- Elevation: 124 m (407 ft)

Population (2021)
  - Total: 148 034
  - Density: 5.58/km^{2} (14.4/sq mi)
- Time zone: UTC+00:00 (WET)
  - Summer (DST): UTC+01:00 (WEST)
- Postal code: 2675
- Patron: Santíssimo Nome de Jesus
- Website: www.cm-odivelas.pt

Odivelas (European Portuguese pronunciation: [ɔðiˈvɛlɐʃ]) is a city and municipality in the Greater Lisbon area, Portugal. The municipality is located 8 km northwest of the center of Lisbon. Predominantly a residential suburb, the population in 2021 was 148 034, in an area of 26.54 km^{2} (one of the smallest municipalities in Portugal).

== Geography ==
Situated in the old district of Lisbon (historical Estremadura province), the municipality of Odivelas is in the Greater Lisbon area, bordering the municipalities of Loures, Sintra, Amadora and Lisbon.

The region is situated in an extensive plain that extends from Pontinha to Póvoa de Santo Adrião, running through Odivelas and Olival Basto. The rest of the territory is formed by semi-rugged hilltops and valleys, dotted with pine forests and some small agricultural lands (some grazing sheep). Caneças maintains an agricultural character, through cultivation in greenhouses and fields, especially of flowers and ornamental plants.

Administratively, the municipality is divided into 4 civil parishes (freguesias):

- Odivelas
- Pontinha e Famões
- Póvoa de Santo Adrião e Olival Basto
- Ramada e Caneças

== History ==
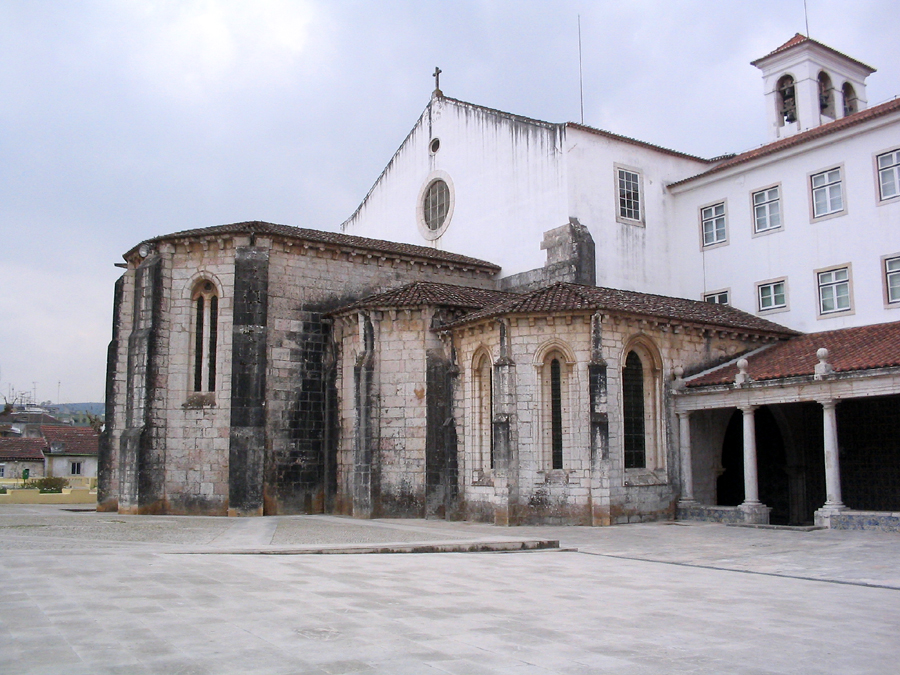
The Monastery of São Dinis

The origin of the name Odivelas is caught up in a peculiar legend that developed from the reign of King Denis. In the legend, King Denis had a habit of travelling late at night to the area of Odivelas, in order to have liaisons with women. On one of these nights, the Queen (Elizabeth of Portugal) waited for her wandering husband, and confronted him about the nightly trips, asking him:

"Ides vê-las senhor...?" (Going to see them sir?)

The phrase was, therefore, corrupted into Odivelas, or "where the King went to see them [the ladies]". Another interpretation stems from the component words: "odi" and "velas". The first, of Arab origin, means water course, while the second, from the Latin reference for the sails of a windmill. Both a river and vestiges of ancient windmills can be identified in the central part of the community.

The dolmen in Pedras Grandes and Batalhas (in the parish of Caneças), the castro of Amoreira (in the parish of Ramada), vestiges of Roman settlements in Póvoa de Santo Adrião, Arab implements in the sub-soils of Paiã (in the parish of Pontinha), indicate that the territory of Odivelas have been occupied continuously over the centuries, owing to its fertile land and temperate climate.

In the main square of Odivelas on 1415, Philippa of Lancaster blessed her three sons (Edward, Peter and Henry) when they departed on horseback for Restelo, where they would begin their overseas voyage to take the city-state of Ceuta.

It was in the Monastery of São Dinis that was first presented in 1534 Auto da Cananeia, by the author Gil Vicente, which was commissioned by Mother-Superior Violente, sister of Pedro Álvares Cabral. The lands around Pontinha become a fertile center during this century, as more and more farmers and nobility migrated into this region (along with Póvoa de Santo Adrião and Caneças). Some property-owners, such as the painter Vieira Lusitano, were part of an influx of cultural residents into Odivelas. In Póvoa de Santo Adrião, the painter Pedro Alexandrino, would later contribute to the works in the Sé Cathedral in Lisbon, the Queluz National Palace and the Coach Museum in Belém.

The theft from the main church of Odivelas (on 11 May 1671) was the origin to the monument dedicated to the Senhor Roubado (English: Stolen Lord), and which would give rise to the first political cartoon, that would criticize the activities of the Inquisition. This was a period when missionaries returning from Asia and Africa would visit the Convent of Rilhafoles, in Paiã (Pontinha). Another controversy arose in 1723, when the sisters in the monastery were aghast at the assumption that a Brazilian nun could be Jewish, and had infiltrated their order (assuming to save herself from persecution by the Inquisition). They went so far as to present the case to the Cardinal-Inquisitor, and upon that failure, to the King (who refused to arbitrate). The nuns were eventually summarily carted-off by soldiers and returned to the monastery. Ironically, much later, Mother Paula de Odivelas (real name Paula Teresa da Silva e Almeida), with whom King John V (30 years her senior) had a passionate affair, would join the sisters. Their relationship would last until the death of the monarch, although the King would provide a generous monthly stipend after his death.

In 1731, John V decreed the beginning of the construction of the Águas Livres Aqueduct, that began in the Fonte das Águas Livres near Carenque and ended in reservoir in Amoreira (completed in 1834). The Amoreira reservoir (Portuguese: Mãe d'Água), albeit a beautiful space, has a capacity for 5,500,000 litres (1,500,000 US gal) which were transported through tunnels to the numerous fountains in Lisbon. The aqueduct was never totally efficient, and its waters were impure and in low quantities. Much later, in 1833, the Quinta da Pentieira was constructed in the parish of Pontinha, as a cemetery for victims of cholera. Until the 19th century, Lisbon was a city infected by epidemics with poor quality sources of water. Many of the richer citizens paid men (many from Caneças) to deliver to their homes potable water. Water from Caneças was of a good quality, and its fountains provided a quantity of water that was transported by carriage or barrel to residents of Lisbon, in addition to laundry services and horticultural products.

After the religious orders were suppressed, Odivelas began to occupy an important social role, sought after for its open spaces and natural environment; many members of Lisbon's elite built small country estates, or in the beginning of the 20th century, summer homes. The parishes of Odivelas and Pontinha were part of the municipality of Belém, during the era of the writer Alexandre Herculano. Later, they were integrated into the municipality of Olivais (in 1885). In 1886, the municipality of Loures was established, which included many of the other parishes of Odivelas. In 1915, the civil parish of Caneças was official constituted. Development in this area began to move away from agriculture, and more and more homes were built. The connection to Lisbon, and the construction of roadways, resulted in the purchase of lands in the region.

In Pontinha, the command post of the Armed Forces Movement was responsible for assisting the establishment of a democratic Portugal on 25 April 1974 (Carnation Revolution).

Regional intensification, caused by the subdivision of land, greatly affected the local landscape. Twenty-five years after the Carnation Revolution, 85 clandestine barrios developed. Simultaneously, the explosion of civil construction projects (due to a lack of affordable homes in Lisbon) occurred in all the parishes of the municipality (except in Famões), which translated into an increase in the resident population. The political organs developed to support these changes, resulting in the creation of the civil parishes of Pontinha in 1984 and Olival Basto, Ramada and Famões in 1989. Póvoa de Santo Adrião became a town in 1986, Odivelas was elevated to the status of city in 1990, Pontinha to town in 1991 along with Olival Basto in 1997. In this same year, in order to defend local plan for development, a group of citizens established the Movimento Odivelas a Concelho (Odivelas for Municipality Movement). On 19 November 1998, with a unanimous vote of members of the National Assembly, the creation of the Municipality of Odivelas was approved, with its seat in the city of Odivelas. On 20 January 1999, the Comissão Instaladora do Município de Odivelas was empowered by the Minister of Equipment, Planning and Administration of the Territory João Cravinho with its new transitional administrative duties. Three years later, the commission ceased to function, and after municipal elections in December 2001, the first municipal government for Odivelas was sworn in. Since then the city became a bastion of the Socialist Party which carried every local election and all but one of the national legislative elections.

== Historical highlights ==
The most famous monument in Odivelas is the women's Convent of Saint Denis of Odivelas, founded by King Dinis I around 1295. Many famous religious women lived in the convent, which was frequently visited by Kings and Queens (indeed, several Kings had illegitimate sons with the nuns). The Gothic convent was very much damaged in the 1755 Lisbon earthquake, but the apse has survived, as well as the tomb of King Dinis and his daughter, Princess Maria Afonso. The Convent also has interesting architecture in Manueline and Baroque styles.

Another interesting sight is the Odivelas Memorial, a curious, early 14th century monument. It carries a coat-of-arms of Portugal in the late 15th century style, when the monument may have been restored. The purpose of this monument is not exactly known, but it may have been erected to mark the arrival of the body of King Dinis in Odivelas, to be buried in the Convent.

In the early 18th century, King John V, ordered the construction of an aqueduct to transport water from the parish of Caneças to the city of Lisbon, which suffered from chronic lack of water. The Águas Livres Aqueduct, which began to operate in 1748, is one of the masterpieces of ancient Portuguese engineering.

In Pontinha the command post of the Armed Forces Movement that led the 1974 Carnation Revolution is now a museum.

== Sports ==
Odivelas Futebol Clube is the most representative sporting association in the city, with three soccer fields, gymnasium, and other facilities.

== Notable people ==
- Isabel Wiseler-Santos Lima (born 1961 in Odivelas) a Luxembourgish politician and Member of the European Parliament
- Paulo Santos (born 1972 in Odivelas) a Portuguese retired football goalkeeper with 382 club caps
- Nelson Évora (born 1984) an Ivory Coast-born Portuguese track and field athlete who specializes in the triple jump, brought up in Odivelas
