= Odivelas (parish) =

- Civil parish
- Coat of arms

- Location in Portugal
- Coordinates: 38.790°N 9.180°W
- Country: Portugal
- Region: Lisbon
- Metropolitan area: Lisbon
- District: Lisbon
- Municipality: Odivelas

Area
  - Total: 5.04 km^{2} (1.95 sq mi)

Population (2011)
  - Total: 59,546
  - Density: 12,000/km^{2} (31,000/sq mi)
- Time zone: UTC+00:00 (WET)
  - Summer (DST): UTC+01:00 (WEST)

Odivelas is a civil parish in the municipality of Odivelas, Portugal. The population in 2011 was 59,546, in an area of 5.04 km².
