= Penafiel Palace =

- Portuguese: Palácio Penafiel
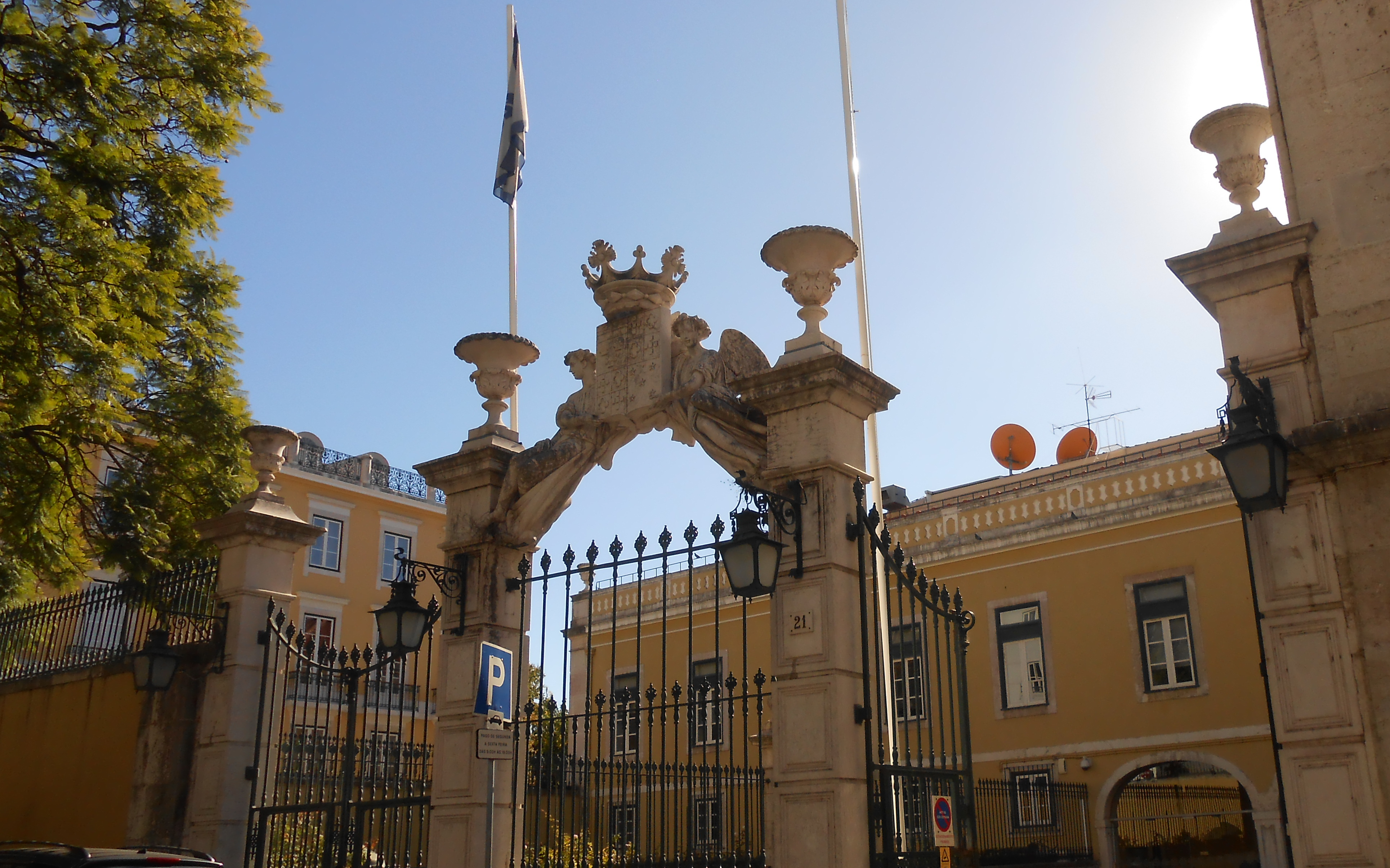
- The main gate and facade of the Palace
- Interactive map of the Penafiel Palace area

General information
- Type: Palace
- Architectural style: Pombaline
- Location: Santa Maria Maior, Portugal
- Coordinates: 38°42′39.1″N 9°8′3.8″W
- Opened: 17th century
- Owner: Portuguese Republic

Technical details
- Material: Mixed masonry

Design and construction
- Architect: António Tomás da Fonseca

The Palace of the Counts of Penafiel (Portuguese: Palácio dos Condes de Penafiel), commonly known as Penafiel Palace (Palácio Penafiel) and also referred as Palace of the Postmaster-General (Palácio do Correio-Mor), is a palace in Portugal, located in the Santa Maria Maior parish, Lisbon. It presently serves as the global headquarters of the Community of Portuguese Language Countries, also known as the Lusophone Community.

== History ==
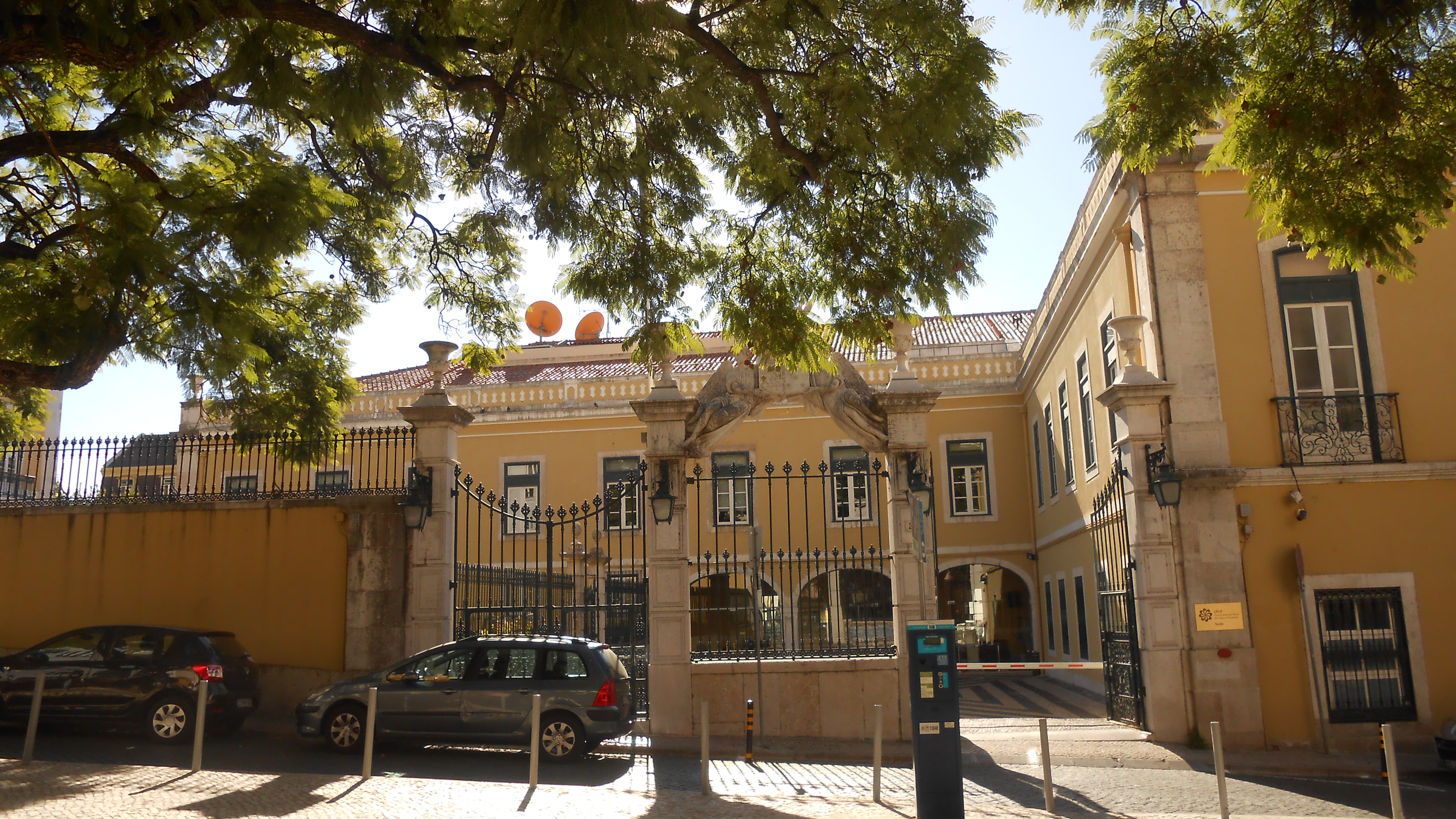
The principal façade of the palace, fronting the Largo do Correio-Mor.

The palace was built in the first half of the 17th century over the remains of the Palace of the Postmaster-General. Between 1606 and 1755 it had served as the residence of the postmaster-general (correio-mor), being so the seat of the postal authority for the Kingdom. But, the palace was only concluded in 1776, after remodeling associated with its reconstruction, following the devastating 1755 Lisbon earthquake.

When the office of postmaster-general was abolished in 1797, his resident was made Count of Penafiel in compensation, thereby resulting in the new designation of the palace.

In 1859, the kingdom's last official postmaster-general to the Kingdom, Manuel José da Maternidade da Mata de Sousa Coutinho, 1st Count of Penafiel (n.1782) died in the residence. The palace passed into the hands of his only daughter, the 2nd Countess and 1st Marquess of Penafiel, D. Maria da Assunção da Mata de Sousa Coutinho (1827-1892). There was a campaign around 1865 to remodel the palace, that included redecoration, the alteration of the principal access and the arrange of the frontispiece under the direction of António Tomás da Fonseca. Following the death of the marquess in 1891, the palace began to be partially rented.

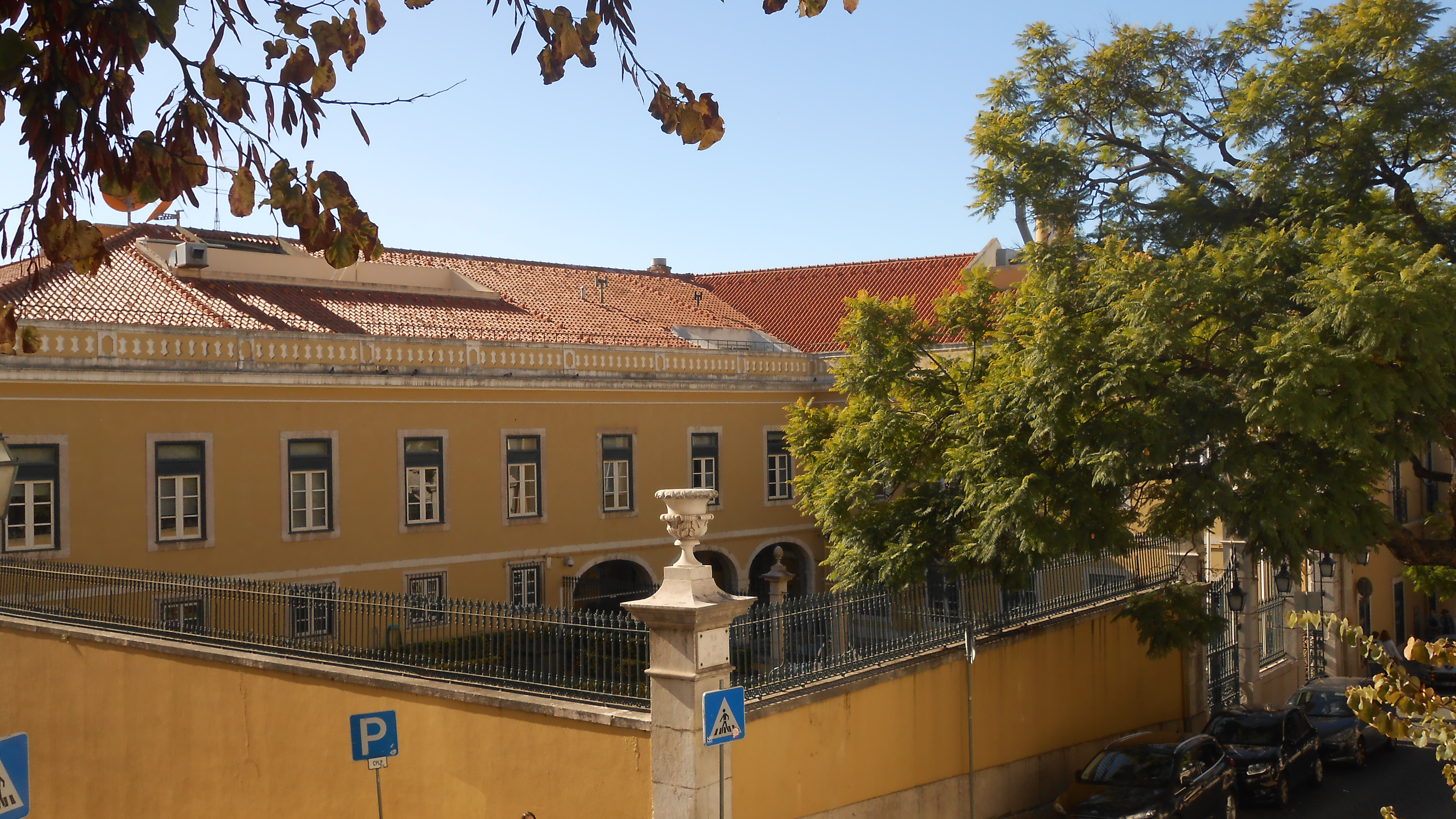
The enclosure/courtyard of the palace showing the spine of the "L-shaped" building

Between 1894 and 1904, the Viscountess of Almeida and her four daughters resided at the palace, using an access along the Rua das Pedras Negras, 16. Two years later (and until 1910), it became the residence of Manuel Afonso Espregueira, Finance Minister under kings Carlos I and Manuel II, using an access from a doorway along Rua de São Mamede, 63. By the end of 1904, a great part of the palace was occupied by the residence of the Ambassador of Spain.

The palace required significant repairs in 1914, and was in the course of being purchased by the State Railways (Caminhos de Ferro do Estado) and eventually concluded in 1919. By 1941, the Directorate-General of the State Railways was operating from the site, but was eventually replaced by the Superior Council of Public Works, forerunner of the Ministério das Obras Publicas, Transportes e Comunicações.

The State Commission for Furniture Acquisition, along with the architects Eduardo Moreira Santos and Luís Benavente, began to deal with providing furniture for Public Works, complementing the work and expansion at that the Direção Regional dos Edifícios de Lisboa (Lisbon Regional Directorate for Buildings). The furnishing for the Gabinete do Presidente was studied by Luís Benavente. In this first phase, the furniture was acquired from the factories Aséta (in Porto) and Madeiras & Móveis (from Praia da Granja). Between 1951 and 1952, the second phase of the project was furnished by factories Alberto de Sousa Reis (in Espinho) and Olaio (in Lisbon).

In 2011 the palace was offered to the Community of Portuguese Language Countries to serve as its global headquarters.

== Architecture ==
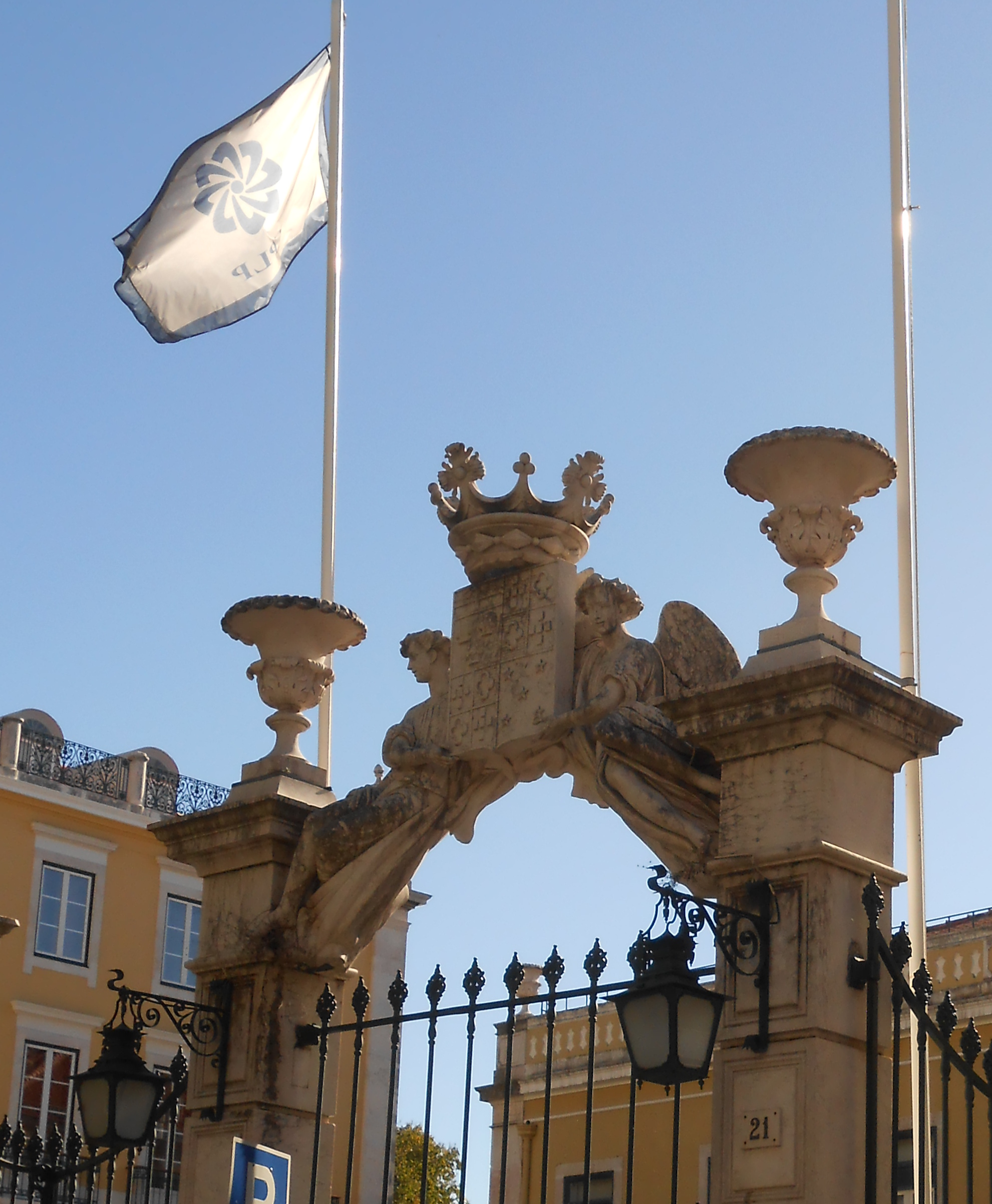
Flag of the Community of Portuguese Language Countries flying at Penafiel Palace.

The palace is situated in an urban location, occupying the entire block marked by a very sharp drop. The L-shaped building is divided into two volumes, a northern and eastern wings, topped in roofing tile. The principal elevation, in the north, is characterized by a succession of wall, doors with access to the patio and top of the northern wing, delimited laterally by granite cornerstones. Above are two floors divided by cornice and separated by friezes, animated by the decorated windows on the ground floor and others with rounded windows and iron grade along the second floor. Between the doors and over a portion of the graded wall, there are two angels supported by pillars and the coat-or-arms of the Counts of Penafiel, surmounted by crown.

The rectangular patio, defined by the limits of the residence and small informal garden (in the northeast). The wainscotting is visible for the monochromatic azulejo tiles, that predate the northern part of the eastern wing, whose ground floor is marked by three arches with the access to the interior. The southern elevation, from the ground floor is decorated in cornerstone and has four floors, and includes three corps, including central plan, decorated in rock-like veneer coating until the last floor. There are 12 vains per floor with windows and doors, with the principal spaces occupying the first floor of the north wing.
