= Portela (Loures) =

- Civil parish
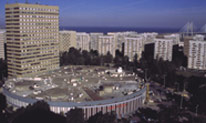
- Commercial centre in the heart of the civil parish of Portela

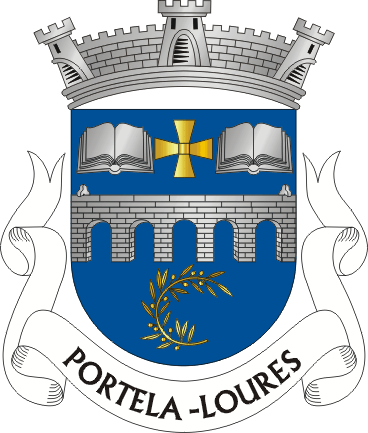
- Coat of arms

- Location in Portugal
- Coordinates: 38°47′5″N 9°6′49″W
- Country: Portugal
- Region: Lisbon
- Metropolitan area: Lisbon
- District: Lisbon
- Municipality: Loures
- Established: Civil parish: 4 October 1985
- Disbanded: 2013

Area
  - Total: 0.95 km^{2} (0.37 sq mi)
- Elevation: 54 m (177 ft)

Population (2011)
  - Total: 11,809
  - Density: 12,000/km^{2} (32,000/sq mi)
- Time zone: UTC+00:00 (WET)
  - Summer (DST): UTC+01:00 (WEST)
- Postal code: 2686-601
- Area code: 219
- Patron: Cristo-Rei
- Website: http://www.jf-portela.pt

Portela (Portuguese pronunciation: [puɾˈtɛlɐ]) is a former civil parish in the municipality of Loures, Lisbon District, Portugal. In 2013, the parish merged into the new parish Moscavide e Portela.

== History ==
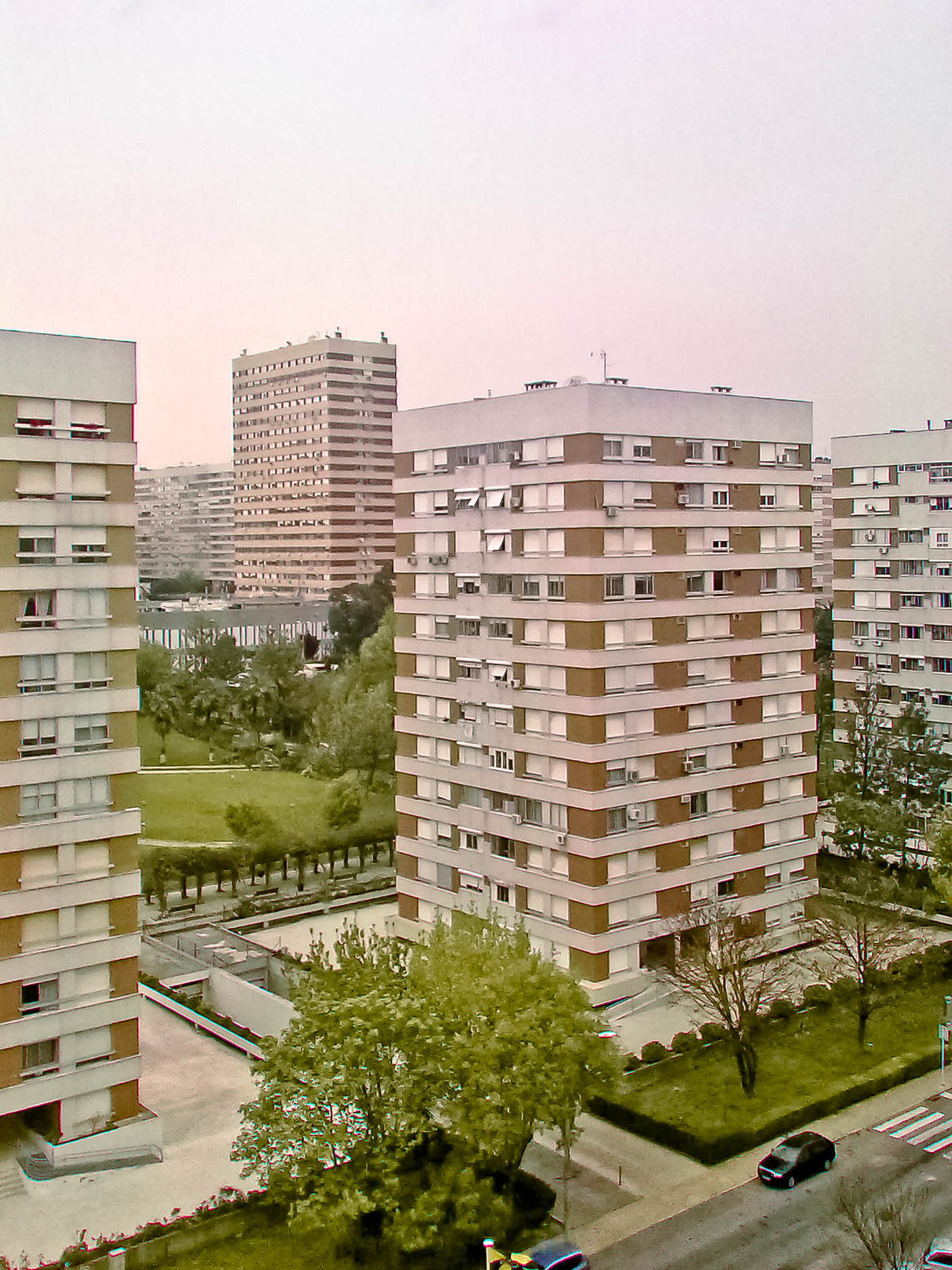
The apartment blocks of the civil parish of Portela de Sacavém

In toponymic terms, Portela gets its name from two Portuguese definitions: portela is derived from a corruption of the Latin portulla or portella, which means "small door" or "entryway"", since it can be considered the access to Lisbon (and/or south part of the Tagus estuary); the term portela is also, literally "a point where a road or street forms a bend or angle, ordinarily in a bottleneck or tributary"". Geographically, the second statement is also true, since the parish's northern limits are cornered by two important bends (Avenida Infante Dom Henriques-IC17 and IC17-A1).

Portela's masterplan was deeply inspired by Swiss architect Le Corbusier's utopian scheme of "A Contemporary City for 3 Million People" (1922), and its urbanism based on the premise of a modern architecture that was exposed it to the maximum levels of sun, air and nature (as stated in the 1933 Athens Charter of Congrès International d'Architecture Moderne).

Similarly, in the early part of the 1960s, a development in Buenos Aires had a comparable effect on the future urbanization of Portela; the development was geometric in design, with composite linear roadways around a central centre. In Lisbon, a similar layout was achieved by a New York architect, who was commissioned to construct a development that centred on a large commercial mall in the 1970s (the first of its type to be completed using urban planning concepts in the capital). The idea was to organize apartment blocks around a central commercial structure, in order to create a pole of socio-economic activities. Constituted in 1985, the civil parish of Portela has become a Portuguese reference for urban architecture.

In 1965, a draft plan for the future scheme was approved by the Government, implying the expropriation of five farms which were sharing this parcel of land and supplying Lisbon with agricultural goods. The plan, covering an area of 50 hectares, laid out a vision for a future area with 4500 homes and all sort of social equipments, responding to the big demand of housing for the people who were flocking to the Capital in a high number either from the ex-colonies in Africa or from other parts of the country.

The early residents of the modern Portela were young couples with their children, many returning from the Portuguese Colonies, others liberal professionals such as lawyers, engineers, physicians, or judges and some older politicians, ostensibly from middle- to upper-middle class. The growth of the region was influenced by the youth culture, a bohemian collection of punk, metal, anarchist and others on the vanguard of the youth movement, who would spend time in the Bairro Alto district, ending their nights in Cais do Sodré, Jamaica, Tóquio or Shangrila. As time evolved, the Association of Portela Homeowners, the parish Church and the Junta Freguesia became more active in the activities of the residents. By the 1990s, the youth movement had moved on to areas of Alcântara-Mar, the Kapital or the Kremlin. At this time, the Esplanada da Portela (the main strip), with its open-air green-spaces attracted more of the local residents, and slowly the tennis courts and football field were constructed to fix the local population. As the population continued to age, many married and moved away, although some remained in the region while others moved closer to the river's edge, as the Expo 98 lands were repurposed for residential living.

== Geography ==
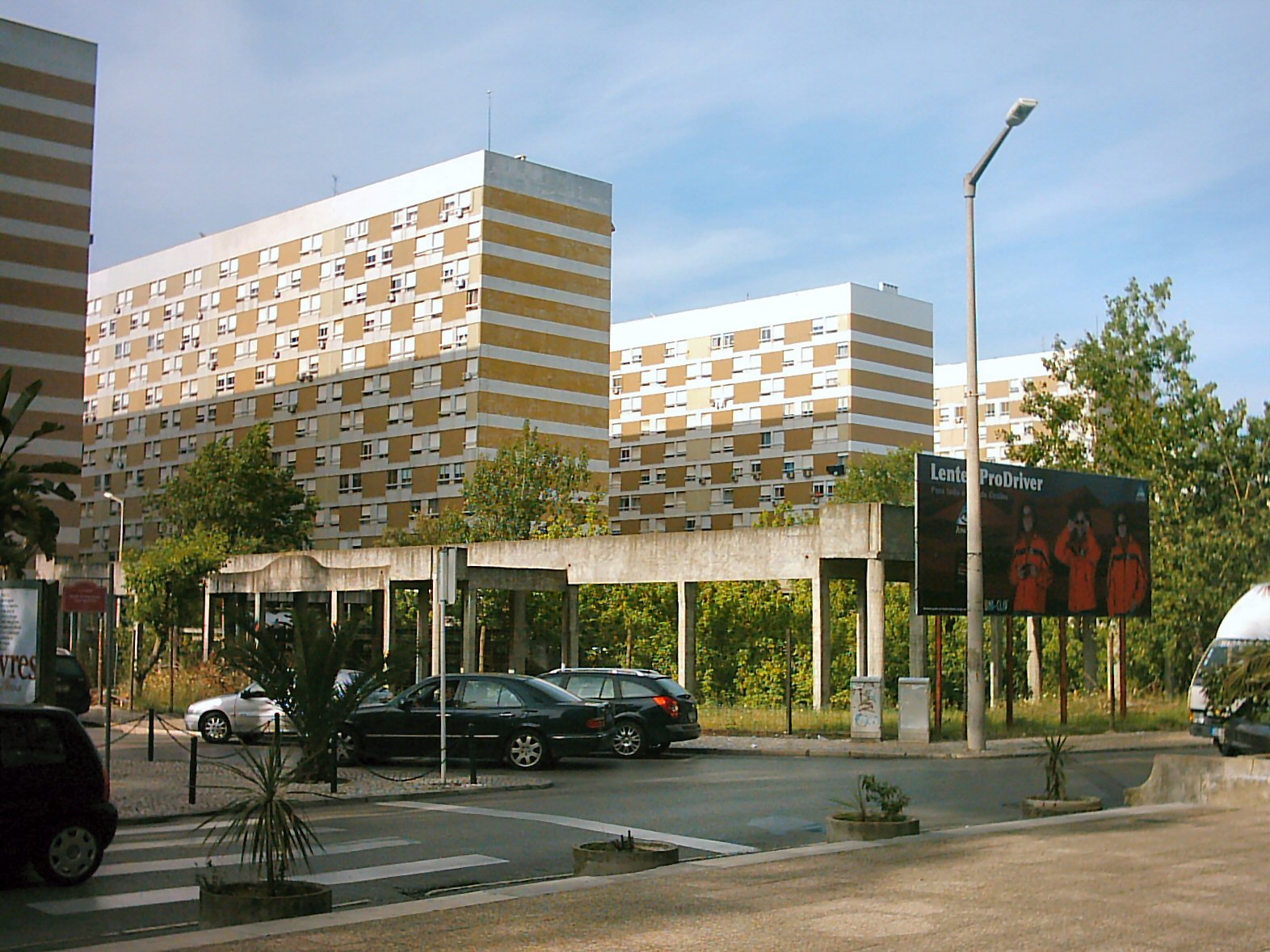
The modern blocks of Portela in front of the Jardim das Descobertas

The Church of Cristo Rei da Portela, a modern church built by local donations

Bordering the urban parishes of Moscavide, Sacavém, Prior Velho and the municipality of Lisbon (parish of Santa Maria dos Olivais), Portela includes approximately 20,000 inhabitants in an area of about one km^{2}. It is located barely two kilometres from Lisbon's International Airport and at the intersection of two of Portugal's main road axisways: the A1 (Lisbon-Oporto motorway) and A12-IC17 CRIL (Circular Regional Interior de Lisboa) inter-urban ring-roadway (linking it directly to the Vasco da Gama bridge and the southern part of the Tagus estuary. The parish is situated on a gentle slope running west to east forming a slight plateau. Starting from the southern edge of the Seminary of Olivais, the southern border extends east to the on/off-ramps of the Vasco da Gama bridge, then follows the motorway northeast until the intersection of the A1-E1 cloverleaf interchange. The border then follows the A1-E1 west until the interchange at Avenida Mal. Craveiro Lopes, where it bypasses the Avenida Dr. Alfredo Bensaúde, instead following the Estrada da Circunvalação until the Largo dos Bombeiros, before returning to the Seminary. It is several blocks north of the Parque das Nações (English: Nation's Park), which lies in the neighbouring Santa Maria dos Olivais.

Its demographics identify an area that includes 41% youth, while only 5.6% seniors, indicating a relatively young population; infant natality (130) to mortality (63) from 1997 identifies a community that is growing (1997). Portela is a high-density residential neighborhood situated on the northeastern section of Lisbon's city boundary. It is the home of 11809 people, most of whom commute to Lisbon for work and leisure.

The Commercial Centre of Portela (Portuguese: Centro Comercial da Portela), hosts one of the higher building in Lisbon, Concórdia (80 m), the Church of Cristo Rei da Portela, the Parque Desportivo da Associação dos Moradores da Portela, the Seminary of Olivais and the parks of Almeida Garrett and Descobertas, are examples of the urban social and cultural structures that have attracted residents to the area in the past. The Centro Comercial is situated in the heart of the civil parish, at the former-centre of the communities traditional centre. It was remodelled and reinvigorated to include new shops such as computer and technology, spas, clothing/apparel outlets and shoe shops, in addition to banking. The Church of Cristo Rei da Portela is the pride of the Catholic faith community; erected slowly, through local contributions, it is a significant modern architectural design uncommon to the other Portuguese styles. The parish has a Complex with two pools, that is operated by the municipal company GesLoures. One pool of the Complex (25 x 12,5 meters) is used for swim competitions, training and more advanced classes, while the other (12.5 x 8 metres) is used for more basic swimming classes. The facilities were one of the few buildings to the constructed to be energy efficient, recycling energy, utilizing solar panels and reducing the consume of energy and emissions of carbon dioxide. The Parque Desportivo has three tennis courts and field, an esplanade and a swimming pool. Generally, the parish is a linear alignment of roads, comprising a hundred 10- to 12-storey buildings, that form a rectangle which has a circular shaped shopping centre and a 20-storey tower at its very middle point.

With a large population density (approximately 12430 inhabitants per square kilometre), the parish is equipped with many collective structures including water supplies, sewage treatment, garbage pickup (with access to landfill in Vila Franca de Xira) and recently the canalization of natural gas. In the northwest corner of the civil parish, on the corner of Avenida do Ralis and the Estrada da Circunvalação, remains a degraded part of this modern civil parish, consisting of dozens of bungalows, abandoned buildings and ruins.
