= Fort of Alto do Duque =

19th-century fort near Lisbon, Portugal

- Forte do Alto do Duque
- Lisbon District, Near Lisbon in Portugal

Site information
- Owner: Portuguese government
- Open to the public: No
- Condition: Restored

Location
- Coordinates: 38°42′14″N 9°13′20″W

Site history
- Built: 1875-90

Garrison information
- Occupants: Portuguese Public Security Police

The Fort of Alto do Duque is located 75 meters above sea level at the southwestern tip of the Monsanto Forest Park, in the parish of Ajuda, in Portugal's capital of Lisbon. Built at the end of the 19th century as part of Lisbon's Campo Entrincheirado (Entrenched Field) defensive ring around the city, with the intention that it, together with the Fort of Bom Sucesso, would defend against attacks along the River Tagus, the fort is now headquarters of the criminal investigation division of the Polícia de Segurança Pública (PSP) in Lisbon.

== Construction ==
Construction of the fort took place between 1875 and 1890, on land that was part of a farm owned by the Duke of Cadaval. Situated on a hill with dominant view over the downtown area of the Lisbon suburb of Algés and the Tagus, it has an irregular pentagonal shape, largely buried at the level of the land, and surrounded by a moat. The central area is covered by a dome. There is also a separate barracks building separated from the main building by the moat and connected by a bridge. The fort is officially named as “Military Building No. 31 / Lisbon.

== Uses ==
On 17 April 1901, it was the scene of the first wireless connection in the country, transmitting a message across the Tagus to a receiving station installed at the Fort of Trafaria, on the other bank of the Tagus, a distance of 4,300 meters. During a period of labour strikes in 1912 it was, together with several other forts, used to detain strikers.

The fort was equipped with four 15 cm SK L/40 naval guns manufactured by Krupp. Starting in 1932, a detachment trusted by the regime, known as the "Detachment of Alto do Duque Fort", was posted there. In 1936, it responded to the artillery fire of Portuguese naval vessels that revolted and tried to leave the Tagus to support the Spanish Republican cause in opposition to General Francisco Franco during the Spanish Civil War (1936-39). During the period known as the Processo Revolucionário Em Curso (Revolutionary process in progress) following the Carnation Revolution of 25 April 1974, which overthrew the authoritarian Estado Novo regime, the fort was briefly headquarters to COPCON, a military command created by the left-leaning Armed Forces Movement. This was dissolved after the failed left-wing Coup of 25 November 1975. Later it hosted the Defence Strategic Information Service (SIED), before being transferred to the PSP.
