= Campo Entrincheirado =

Military defence for Lisbon, Portugal

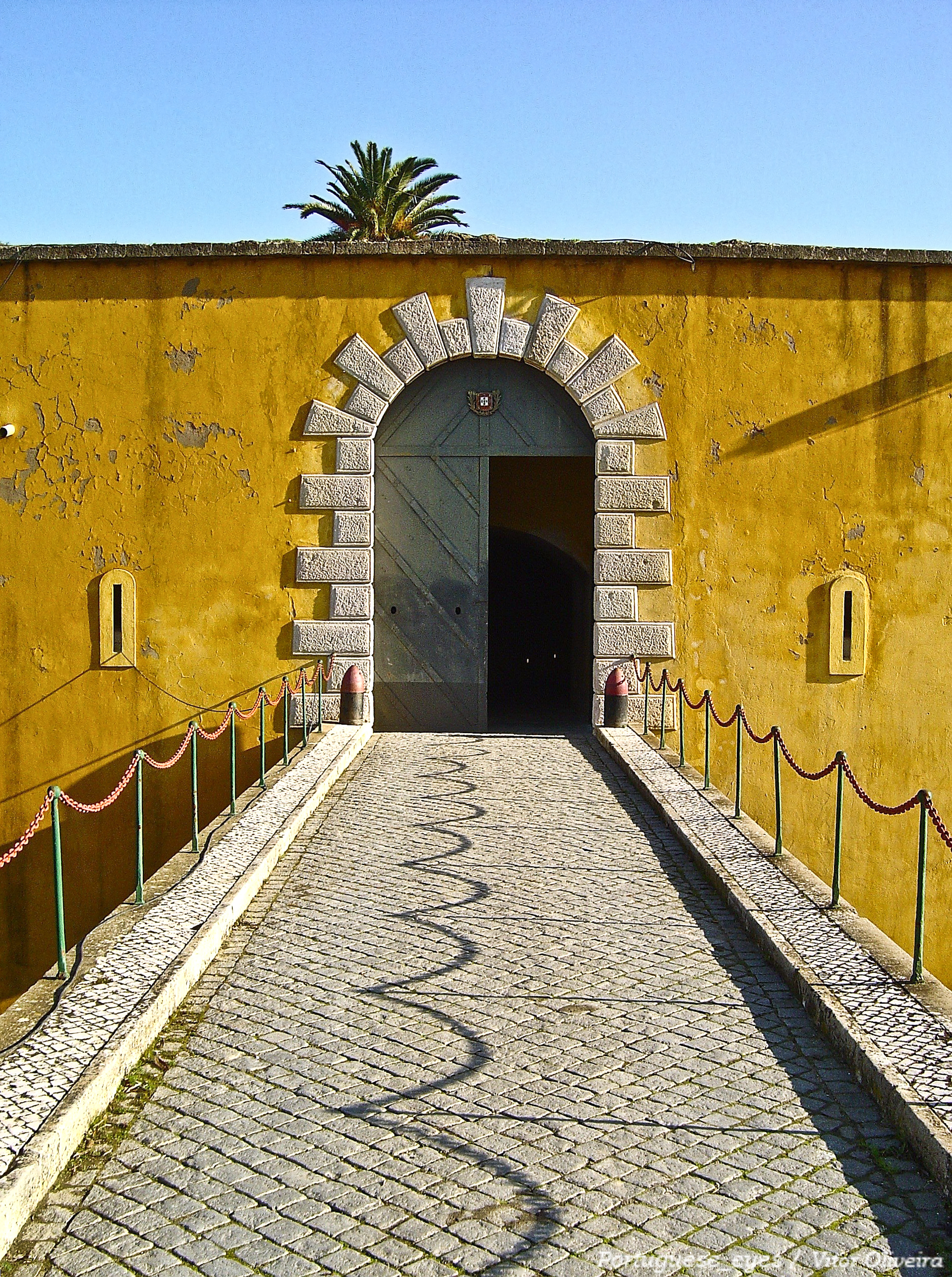
Entrance to the Sacavém fort

The Campo Entrincheirado (Entrenched Field) is a group of fortifications built at the end of the 19th century and beginning of the 20th century to protect the Portuguese capital, Lisbon, against invasion. It followed the boundaries of the city at that time.

== History ==
The invasion of Portugal (1807) by the French that led to the occupation of Lisbon, followed by a second French invasion in 1810 that was repelled by British and Portuguese troops at the Lines of Torres Vedras, the Portuguese Civil War of (1828 – 1834) and other foreign military interventions that plagued Portugal at the beginning of the 19th century led to the development of the doctrine that it was impossible to defend the entire national territory of Portugal with the resources available. At the same time, it was observed that as the capital, Lisbon, had the greatest population and was the economic centre of the country, no invasion of Portugal would succeed unless the city was controlled. It was therefore concluded that the best way to defend Portugal was to defend Lisbon with all available resources.

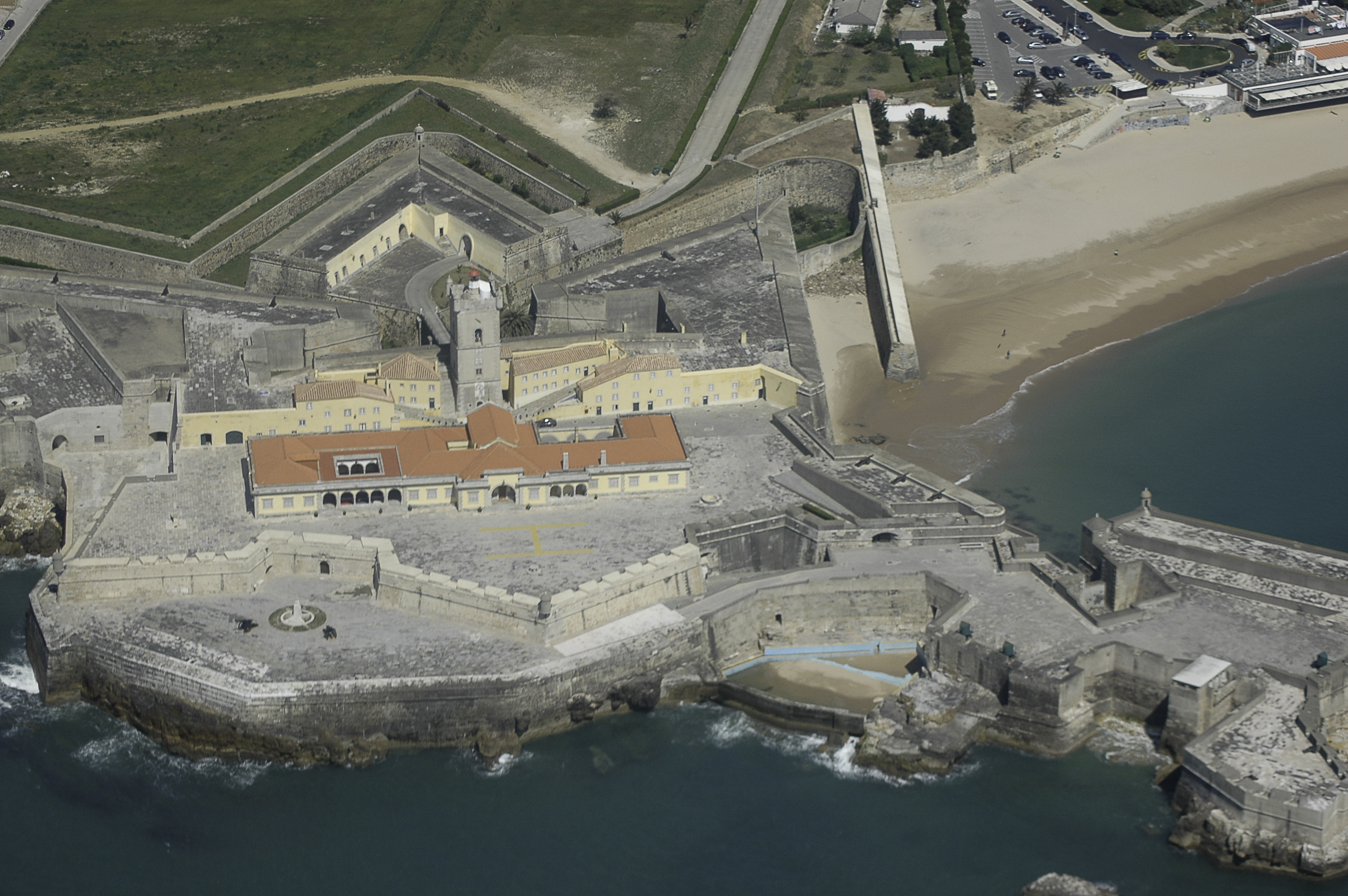
Fort of São Julião da Barra

== Planning ==
In 1857, the then Minister of War, the Marquis of Sá da Bandeira appointed a commission to define a defensive system for Lisbon. The study initially suggested the development of a system in three lines, making use of previous defensive installations. The first line would be a ring between Sacavém and the Fort of São Julião da Barra, which would be centred on new fortifications on the Monsanto Hills (Serra de Monsanto). The second line would make use of the second line of defence built by the Liberals in 1833 during the Civil War, while the third line would be on the left bank of the Tagus, centred on the Fort of Almada. After the death of Sá da Bandeira in 1876, the idea of using the Civil War lines of 1833 was definitively abandoned and the 1857 plan ended up consisting of a northerly line that made use of the Lines of Torres Vedras; a line closer to Lisbon between Vialonga, north of Sacavém on the Tagus, and Sintra; a third line, which became the Campo Entrincheirado; and a line to the south of the river.

== Development ==
The main means established for the defence of the capital was the Campo Entrincheirado, which involved developing a fortification system that followed the city’s perimeter at that time. To this end, several new and modern fortifications were built and existing ones, in one case dating back to the 16th century, were upgraded. The forts were equipped with modern artillery pieces and connected by roads and by telephone and telegraph networks that were quite advanced for the time. From 1899, the Campo Entrincheirado became a separate military command, permanently organized on a war footing, whose commander was a general, reporting directly to the Minister of War. With headquarters at the Monsanto Fort, considered the essential stronghold of the system, the Campo Entrincheirado was to be manned by a permanent staff of 25,000, consisting of infantry, artillery and engineering troops. In event of attack it was envisaged that these would be reinforced by other troops garrisoned in the Lisbon area.

== Subsequent use ==
After the First World War, the defensive concept of a fixed defence, on which the Campo Entrincheirado was based, became obsolete. During World War II some of the facilities were used for anti-aircraft positions. After that war some of the coastal fortifications were adapted to form part of the Barron Plan group of artillery batteries, the last one being deactivated in 1998. Over time, the forts took on new functions, which now include housing the national archives, a museum, the offices of the Serviço de Informações de Segurança (Portuguese Security and Intelligence Service), and two prisons.

== The Forts ==
The nucleus of the Campo Entrincheirado extended from Caxias to Sacavém and consisted of the following forts, which were connected by a road, completed in 1902, known as the Estrada Militar de Caxias-Sacavém (Military Road of Caxias-Sacavém):

- Fort of Sacavém
- Fort of Ameixoeira
- Fort of Monsanto
- Fort of King Luís I, Caxias

This land perimeter was complemented by fortifications that protected the River Tagus, namely:

- Fort of Bom Sucesso
- Fort of Alto do Duque

The Tagus estuary and the south bank of the river were protected by two other forts:

- Fort of São Julião da Barra
- Fort of Almada

Several other smaller forts, redoubts, posts, and batteries complemented this system.
