= Chaimite =

Chaimite may refer to:

- Chaimite, Mozambique, a village in Mozambique
- Bravia Chaimite, a Portuguese armoured vehicle
