= Fort of Trafaria =

17th-century fort south-west of Lisbon, Portugal

- Forte de Nossa Senhora da Saúde da Trafaria
- Setúbal District, Near Almada in Portugal
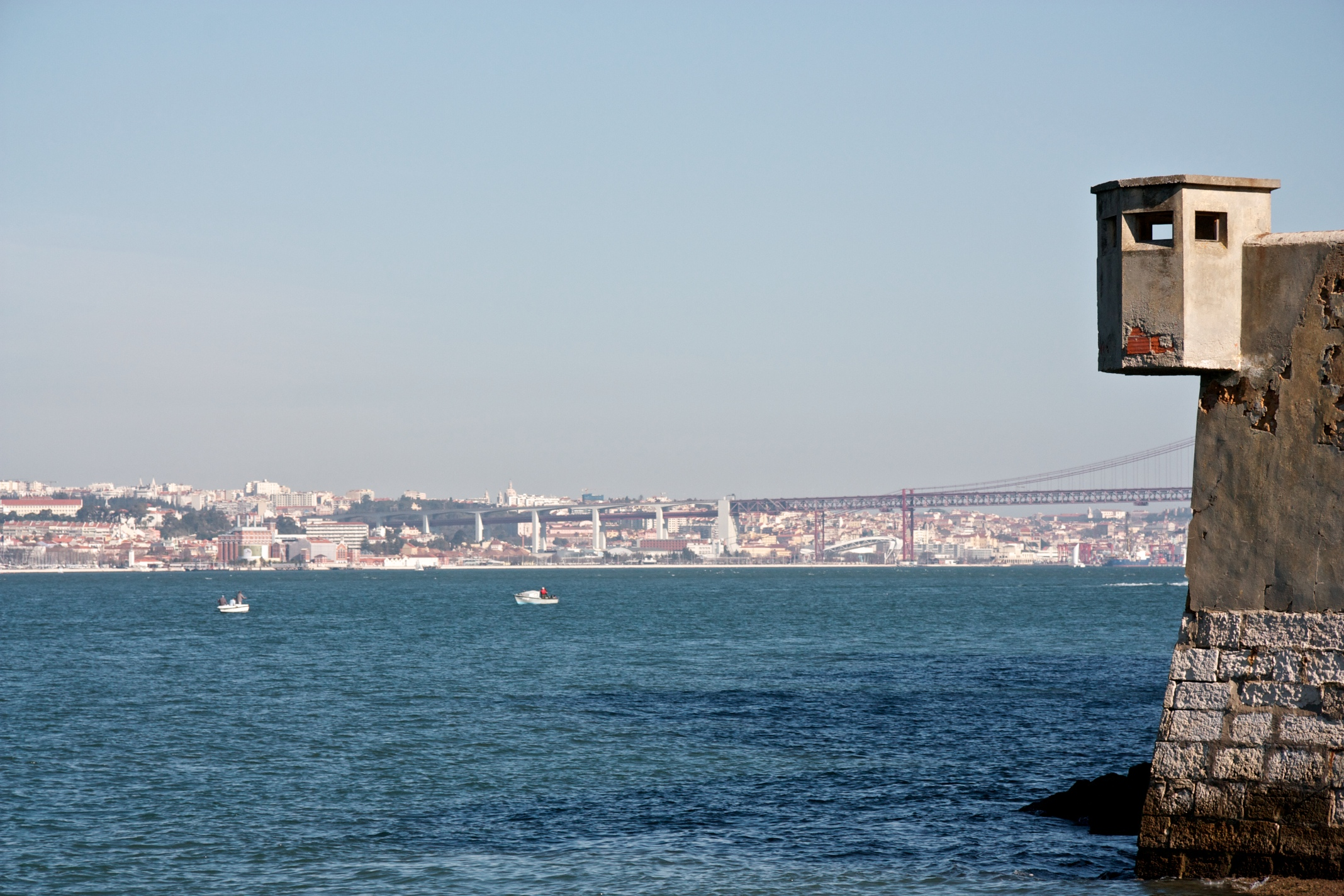

Site information
- Owner: Almada municipality
- Open to the public: No
- Condition: Under restoration (2020)

Location
- Coordinates: 38°40′27″N 9°13′49″W

Site history
- Built: 1678

Garrison information
- Occupants: NOVA University Lisbon

The Fort of Trafaria is a fort in Portugal. Dating back to 1683, it has never been used in battle.

== Location ==
The Fort of Trafaria, also known as the Fort of Nossa Senhora da Saúde da Trafaria, is located on the left bank of the Tagus river, in the parish of Caparica e Trafaria in the municipality of Almada, in the Setúbal district of Portugal. It is south-west of the Belém Tower on the right bank.

== Construction ==
The chapel of Nossa Senhora da Saúde (Our Lady of Health) was constructed in 1678 to accompany a lazaretto, or quarantine hospital, that had been on the site since the late 1600s. The fort was built a few years later in 1683 during the reign of Pedro II of Portugal, to complement the defence of the Portuguese capital of Lisbon. Throughout its history doubts were raised about its defensive effectiveness and the fort has seen little or no military action, since its only real function was to prevent possible disembarkation on the left bank. For a time, it was used as the quarantine hospital.

== Later developments ==
In 1725, works were carried out to rebuild the chapel and the main buildings of the hospital and in 1743 a wall was added to prevent the general population from accessing the chapel during times when there were patients held in quarantine. The area was extensively damaged by the 1755 Lisbon earthquake and restoration was only completed in 1786. The role as a quarantine hospital ended in the early 1800s, when the fort was vacated. Repair works were carried out during the Portuguese Civil War (1828-1834). The fort was used as a military prison until the end of the conflict, after which it was deactivated again. Later, it was occupied by the Algarve Fisheries Company for the production of fish guano, until this activity was stopped for public health reasons. After being re-occupied by the State, it served as a nursery for the national forests and as a shelter for the royal galleys.

== Twentieth century to the present ==
On 17 April 1901, the Fort of Trafaria was the site of the first wireless connection in the country, receiving a message from a transmitting station installed at the Fort of Alto do Duque, on the opposite bank of the Tagus River, a distance of 4,300 meters.

Between 1908 and 1910 it underwent work to adapt its facilities to a military prison and was subsequently used by the Portuguese Navy. The restoration of its chapel dates from this period. However, by 1917 it had, once again, been abandoned. Briefly being used as a private dwelling, it again became a military prison, first for the Navy, then for the Army. Once again in a state of degradation in the second half of the 1990s, the Fort of Trafaria was acquired by the municipality of Almada in 2000. In September 2020 it was announced that it would be rehabilitated at a cost of 7.6 million Euros, to become the site of the Institute of Art and Technology of the NOVA University Lisbon.
