= Fort of Monsanto =

19th-century fort near Lisbon, Portugal

- Forte de Monsanto
- Lisbon District, Near Lisbon in Portugal
- Entrance to the fort, c. 1900

Site information
- Type: Bastion Fort
- Owner: Portuguese government
- Open to the public: No

Location
- Coordinates: 38°44′02″N 9°11′23″W

Site history
- Built: 1889
- Fate: Converted to prison

The Fort of Monsanto, also known as the Marquês de Sá da Bandeira Fort, is located at the top of the Monsanto hill in the Monsanto Forest Park, in Lisbon, Portugal. Built at the end of the 19th century as part of Lisbon's Campo Entrincheirado (Entrenched Field) defensive ring around the city, the fort is now a maximum-security prison.

== Campo Entrincheirado ==
The Campo Entrincheirado involved developing a line of forts that followed the city’s perimeter at that time. Several new and modern fortifications were built and existing ones were upgraded. The forts were equipped with modern artillery pieces and connected by roads and by telephone and telegraph networks that were quite advanced for the time. From 1899, the Campo Entrincheirado became a separate military command, permanently organized on a war footing. The Monsanto Fort was its headquarters.

== History ==
Work on the bastion Fort of Monsanto first began on 30 December 1863 but it was not fully completed until June 17, 1889. At 241 meters above sea level, the highest point in the Monsanto hills, the fort, at the time, allowed total visibility over Lisbon and the River Tagus. Although now wooded, the area was agricultural at the time of construction. The fort had a circular, bomb-proof, dome-shaped design with a diameter of more than 40 metres and was divided internally into three floors. Each floor basically corresponded to a battery. The top floor was for direct fire against the enemy over a considerable range; the second for intermediate fire; and the third for when the enemy succeeded in approaching the fort. The fort had barracks for more than 400 men. Externally, it was surrounded by a moat and its communication with the outside was via a drawbridge. Inside, there was a water cistern with a capacity of 600 cubic metres. It was equipped with 150mm, 120mm, 90mm pieces of artillery and several machine guns, as well as four powerful telescopes.

Between March and June 1896, the fort was used to hold Gungunhana, the last emperor of the Gaza Empire in Portuguese Mozambique, who had rebelled against the Portuguese, together with his son, his uncle, his cook and seven wives, as well as another chief and his three wives. They were eventually sent into exile in the Azores. By a Decree of 1901, the fort was named "Forte Marquês de Sá da Bandeira", after Sá da Bandeira who was Minister of War when the concept of the Campo Entrincheirado of Lisbon was first developed and served as prime minister of Portugal on five occasions. It is also sometimes known as the Central Redoubt of Monsanto.

== Subsequent use ==
Shortly after World War I (1914-18), the concept of a fixed defence, on which the Campo Entrincheirado was based, became obsolete. Even before fully losing its defensive function, the Fort of Monsanto was already being used as a military prison. During the early days of the First Portuguese Republic there were numerous disturbances and strikes in Lisbon and the fort was used to detain strikers in 1912. After deactivation, it was converted to a local civilian prison. There was a severe shortage of prisons in Portugal, with the vast majority being overcrowded and having poor accommodation, and the appropriation of existing buildings for new functions, such as prisons, was quite common at the time. Re-afforestation of the surrounding area to create the Monsanto park took place in the 1930s, with tree planting being carried out by the prisoners. Following additional work in 2007, the fort became classified as a maximum-security prison in 2008.
