= Moscavide e Portela =

- Civil parish
- Location in Portugal
- Coordinates: 38.779°N 9.103°W
- Country: Portugal
- Region: Lisbon
- Metropolitan area: Lisbon
- District: Lisbon
- Municipality: Loures

Area
  - Total: 1.66 km^{2} (0.64 sq mi)

Population (2011)
  - Total: 21,891
  - Density: 13,000/km^{2} (34,000/sq mi)
- Time zone: UTC+00:00 (WET)
  - Summer (DST): UTC+01:00 (WEST)

Moscavide e Portela is a civil parish in the municipality of Loures, Portugal. It was formed in 2013 by the merger of the former parishes Moscavide and Portela. The population in 2011 was 21,891, in an area of 1.66 km².
