= Godide =

Last heir of the Gaza Empire and the Jamine dynasty

- Last heir of the Gaza Empire
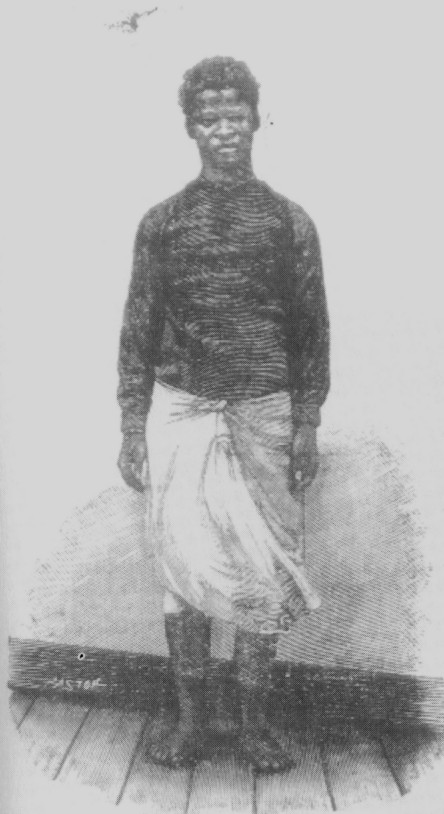
- An engraving of Godide by Francisco Pastor (1895)
- Born: 1876; Modern-day Mozambique
- Died: 31 July 1911 (aged 34–35); Angra do Heroísmo, Portugal
Names
- António da Silva Pratas Godide; Godide Nxumalo
- Dynasty: Jamine dynasty
- Father: Ngungunhane

Godide (1876 in Mozambique – 31 July 1911 in Angra do Heroísmo), or Godide Nxumalo, also known as António da Silva Pratas Godide, was a son of Ngungunhane (or Gungunhana), the last ruler of the Gaza Empire, located in modern Mozambique. He was chosen by his father as putative heir to the throne.

After Ngungunhane was overthrown, Godide was captured by Portuguese troops and sent to Lisbon, accompanying his father into exile in the Azores islands. He was the last recognised heir of the Jamine dynasty of the Nguni people.
