= Fort of Sacavém =

19th-century fort in Portugal

- Forte de Sacavém
- Lisbon District, Near Lisbon in Portugal
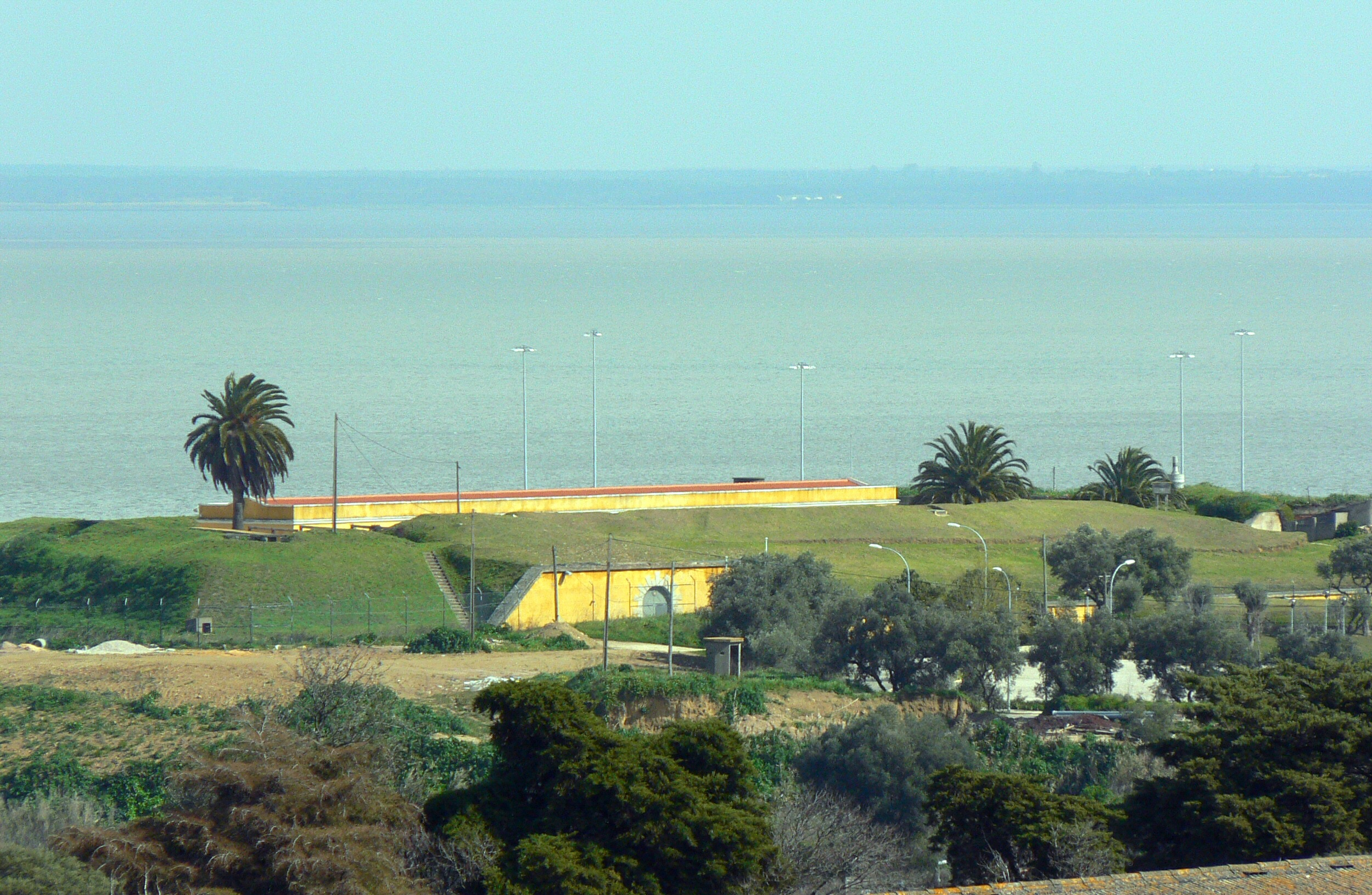
- View of the fort with the River Tagus in the background

Site information
- Type: Bastion Fort
- Owner: Portuguese government
- Open to the public: No

Location
- Coordinates: 38°47′45″N 9°06′05″W

Site history
- Built: 1892
- Fate: Well-preserved

Garrison information
- Occupants: Direção-Geral do Património Cultural

The Redoubt of Mount Cintra (or Mount Sintra), commonly known as the Fort of Sacavém, is located in the town of Sacavém in the municipality of Loures in the Lisbon District of Portugal. It is situated immediately to the north of Lisbon. The fort’s construction began in 1875 and was completed in 1892. Since 2015 it has served as the National Archive for Portugal’s Directorate General of Cultural Heritage (DGPC).

== History ==
The fort is situated on the right bank of the River Trancão, close to its confluence with the River Tagus. Its construction dates back to the construction of the “Entrenched Field of Lisbon” (Campo Entrincheirado de Lisboa), which was a set of fortifications planned after the Portuguese Civil War (1828-1834) to guard against both land-based and maritime attacks. The Fort of Sacavém was built into a small hill about 35 meters high, which gave it a strategic position over the surrounding area. It was designed as a bastion fort in the Vaudon style, with an irregular pentagonal shape. The main entrance is preceded by a concrete bridge (formerly a wooden drawbridge), which leads to a tunnel giving access to the interior. The ground floor of the central building was a trapezoid and was partially buried. Barracks and stores were covered by steel beams joined by filler composed of small rock, sand and lime, and covered by thick masses of earth to absorb the impact of artillery projectiles. The fort was surrounded with a moat, partially buried in the ground, creating the illusion of a grass knoll, which both made the fort barely perceptible when seen from a lower altitude and allowed the absorption of projectiles.

An 1852 army memorandum identified the poor condition of the country’s defences and particularly referred to the need to fortify the cities. In 1857 the Minister of War appointed an initial commission to study the defences of Lisbon and Porto and then appointed a second commission in 1859 presided over by the Duke of Saldanha, which found that the country’s defences were worse off than in 1807. This commission appointed engineering officers to carry out detailed studies of Lisbon’s defensive requirements. Following their recommendations the Government authorised the fortification of Lisbon in 1861 and activities began in 1863, initially in the Monsanto hills to the west of Lisbon, although this work suffered from a lack of funds.

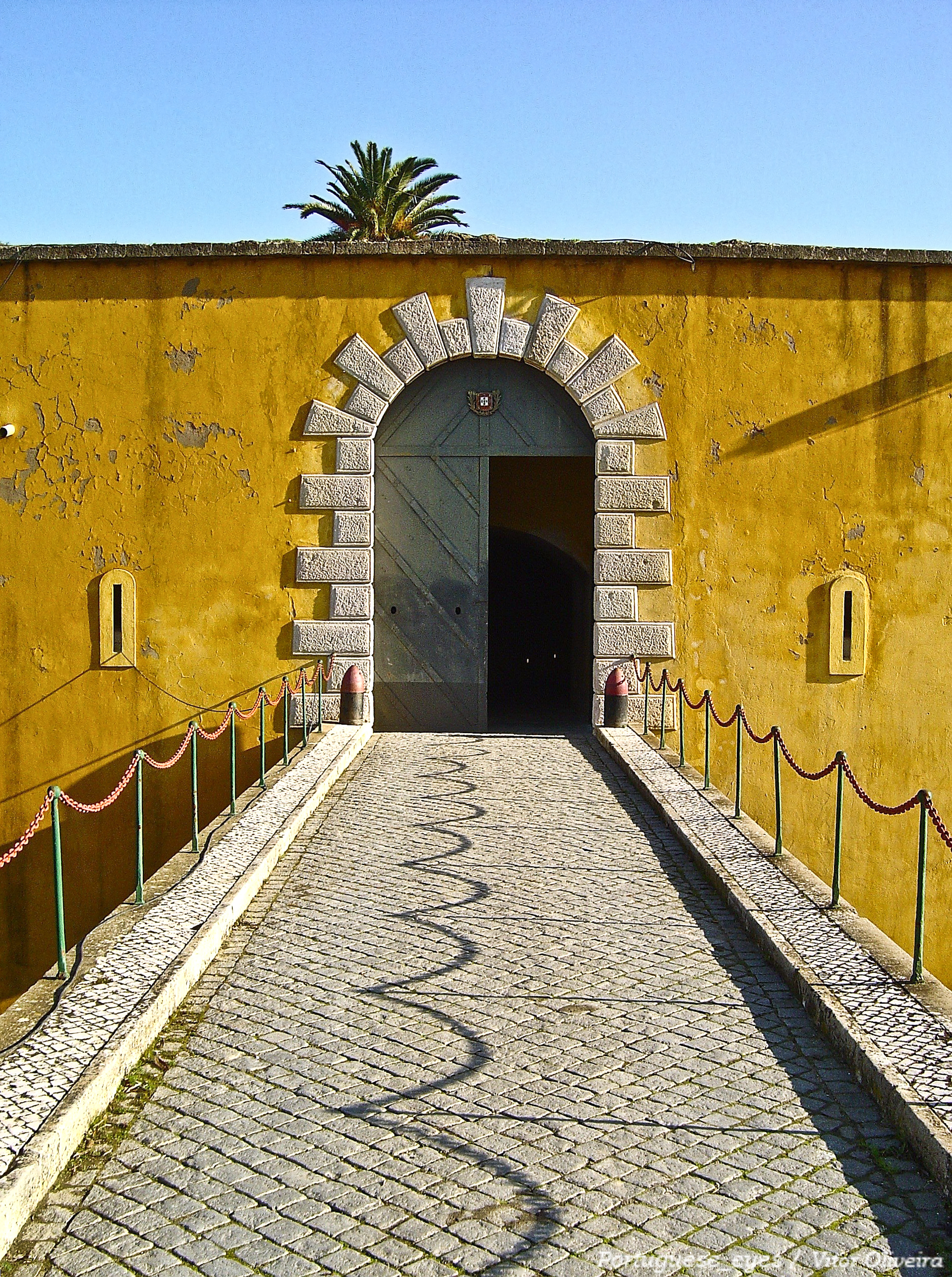
Entrance to the fort

In 1872 studies began for the construction of the redoubt at Sacavém and in 1875 part of the property of the Viscount of Ouguela was purchased as the site for the fort. Building work began in the same year. The purposes of the fort were given as being to prevent the enemy from establishing a base on the other side of the Trancão and to prevent it being crossed, as well as to protect the road and railway line that passed between the fort and the Tagus. In 1899 a decree was issued to officially create the Entrenched Field of Lisbon. The ultimate plan was for nine permanent forts to be linked together between Sacavém and Caxias on the Tagus estuary and in 1902 a road was completed connecting the nine sites.

The Fort of Sacavém never saw battle. In 1912, a time of considerable employee unrest in Portugal, it and three other forts were used to detain 534 strikers. From the 1930s it was used to house an infantry detachment and as a store for munitions, the latter requiring some adaptation to the buildings so that the munitions could be transported in and out. In 1998 the fort still had a small military force but in that year transfer to the Architectural Heritage Inventory Services (SIPA) was authorised.

== Present day ==
Adaptation to its new function lasted until 2007. Following the system used by Library and Archives Canada, the fort now holds two of the country's largest archives of cultural heritage and architecture: the Information System for Architectural Heritage, with a documentary collection composed of more than 7 kilometres of shelves, 500,000 documents and 300,000 photographs of national buildings and monuments; and the Photographic Documentation Archive (ADF), which includes a total of one million images of various items held in national museums and palaces. The library is unique in the country, and is devoted to the dissemination of information on built heritage, especially in the areas of conservation, restoration and urban rehabilitation.

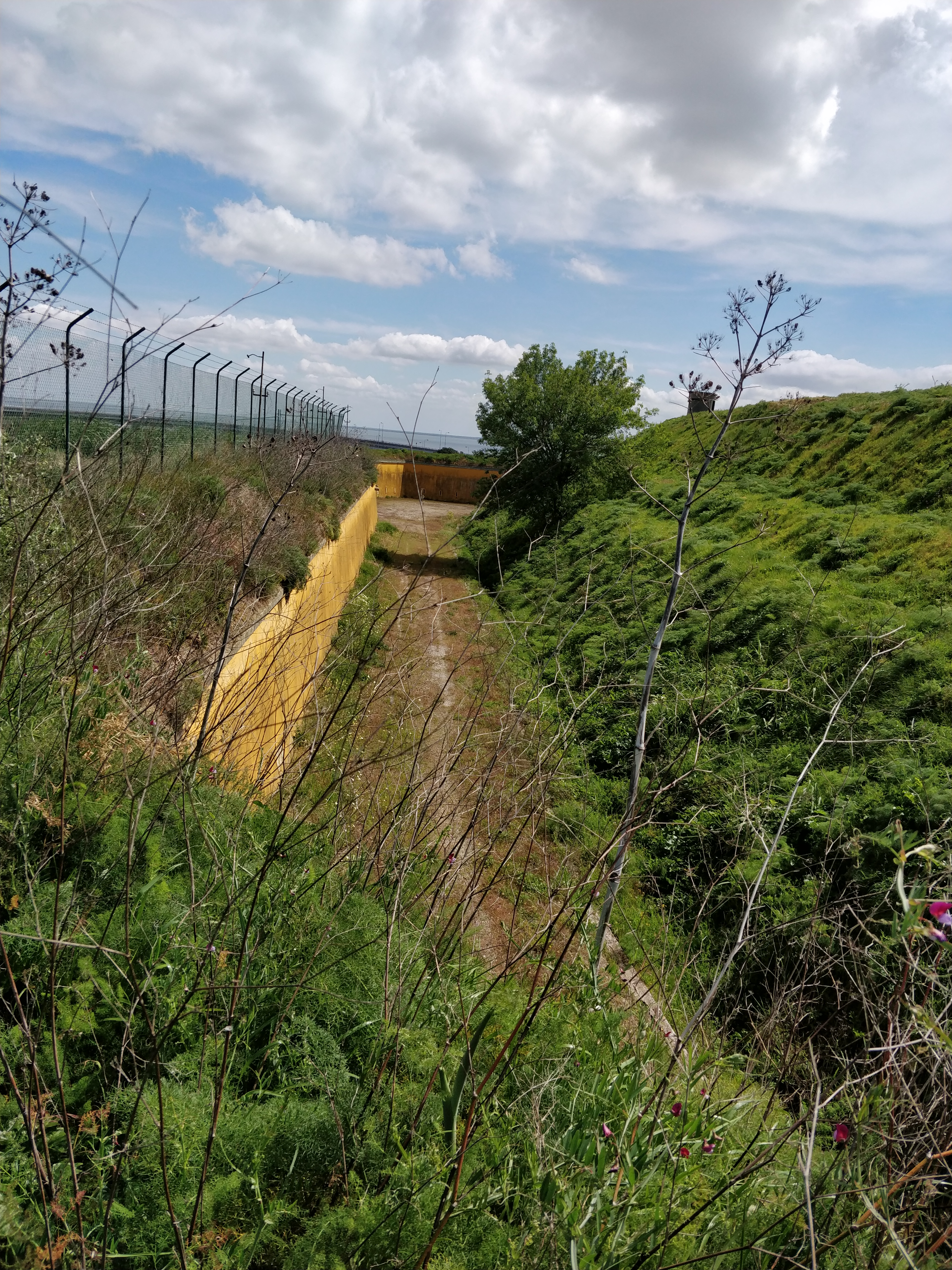
Moat of the Fort of Sacavem

Documents are first held for 21 days in a closed chamber to ensure they are free of any type of infestation and then transferred to another chamber where they are further quarantined for 40 days. Each document is then subjected to a process of hygiene where conservationists clean them. Once certified free of disease they are ready to be archived and inventoried and then stored in one of five different environments with different levels of humidity, air temperature and oxygen, according to the requirements of the individual documents.

The Sacavém fort has attracted a wide variety of birds, some of which nest there. Visits to the fort are not permitted unless for purposes of using the archives.
