= Barron Plan =

Plan for the coastal defences of Portugal

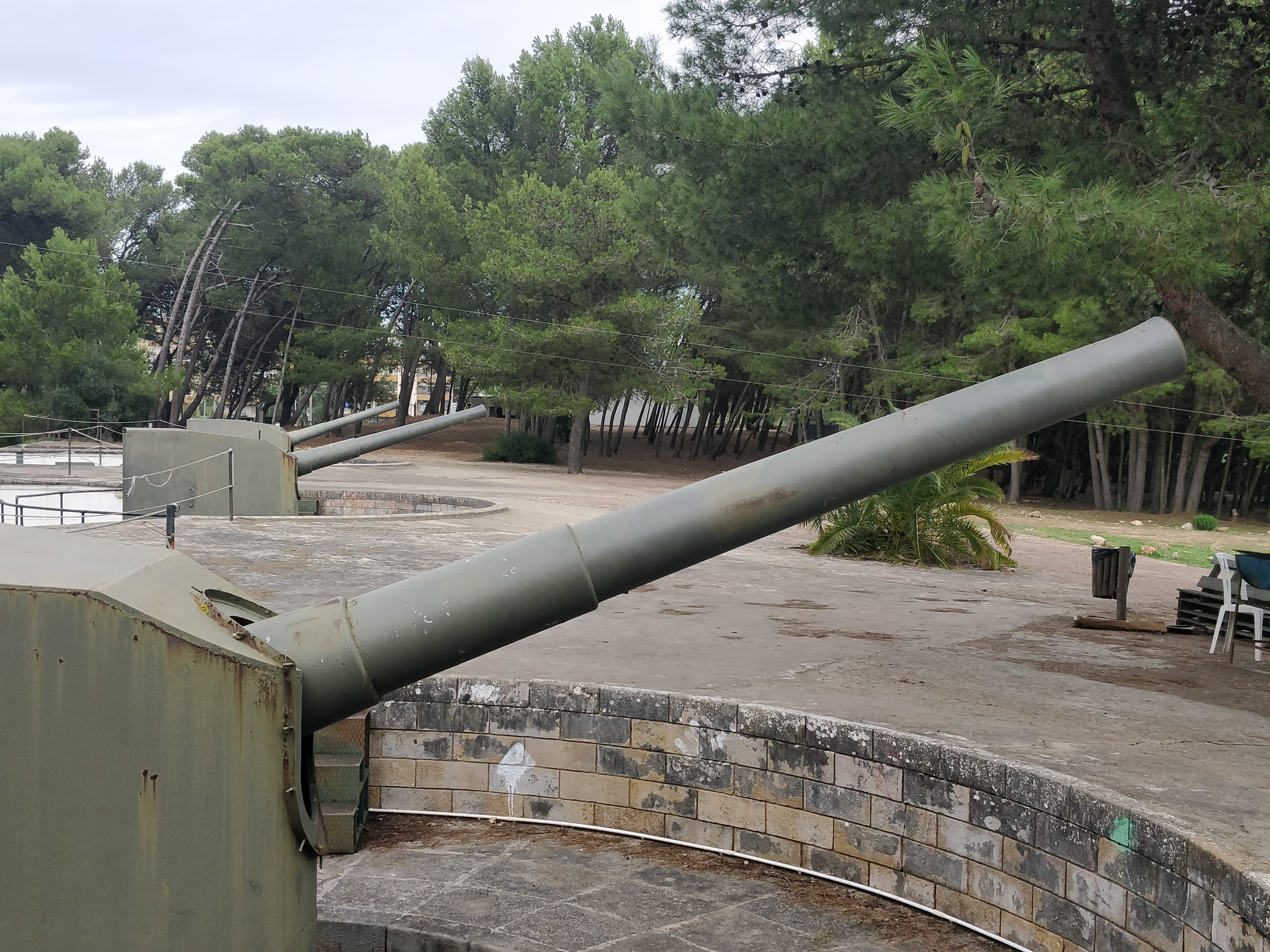
Three 15cm Krupp guns at Battery 3

The Barron Plan was an Anglo-Portuguese plan for military infrastructure developed after World War II, to provide coastal defences for the Portuguese capital of Lisbon and the major port of Setúbal. These defences were installed between 1948 and 1958, involving fixed batteries along the banks of the Tagus and Sado rivers and on the Atlantic Ocean side of the Setúbal peninsula. The batteries were manned by the Coastal Artillery Regiment (RAC).

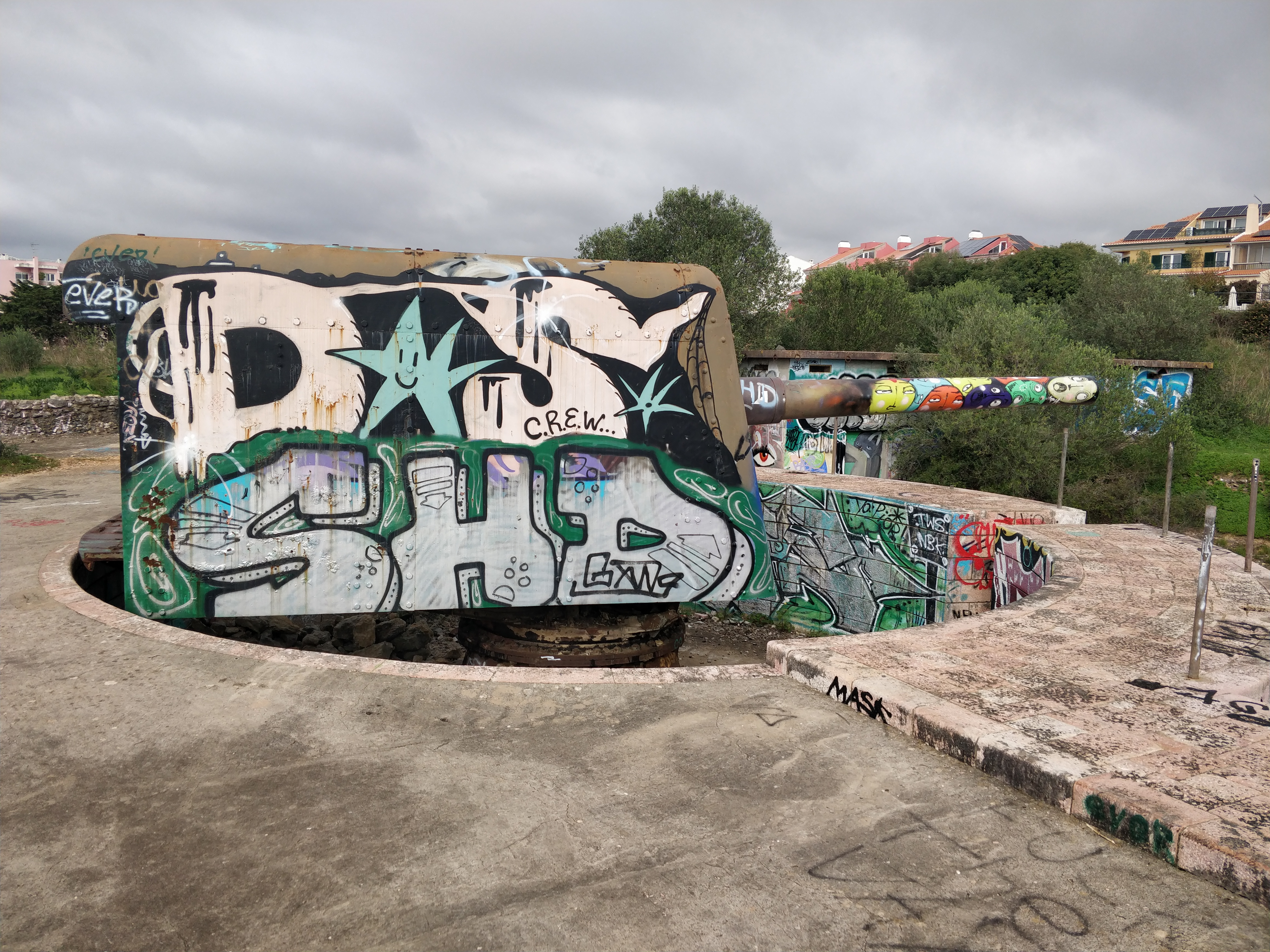
A neglected 15.2cm Vickers gun at Battery 2

== Background ==
Lisbon had always been vulnerable to attacks from the sea and the use of forts and cannon fire for defence went back to the 14th century. In 1938, the Portuguese leader, António de Oliveira Salazar requested the British War Office to develop a project to defend the capital of Portugal. The strategy used to develop the plan began with the identification of vulnerable points in the Lisbon and Setúbal areas, based on the assumption that enemy vessels would comply with the rules set out in the Washington Naval Treaty, which limited the range of naval guns to 32 kilometers (20 miles). The plan was worked on before World War II by a British general named Barron. In 1938, he presented his preliminary plan. The following year, this was revised by technical specialists from Portugal and Britain during numerous meetings.

In 1943, Portugal implicitly ended its neutrality in World War II by transferring the Lajes airfield on Terceira Island in the Azores to the United Kingdom for use by US and UK planes to search for German submarines. In exchange, one of Portugal's demands was that the Barron Plan be implemented. However, the first artillery battery was not finished until 1948 and it took a further ten years for all to be completed. There was a high level of secrecy about the plan and its implementation and it was not until the second decade of the 21st century that information about it was declassified, even though the RAC was disbanded in 1998, by which time only two of the batteries remained active.

== Description ==
The Barron forts consisted of eight batteries together with, in most cases, extensive, deep bunkers for storage and accommodation. Some were supplemented by coastal observation points designed to relay the coordinates of enemy ships back to the batteries. While some of the batteries were completely new, others were constructed on the sites of existing defences that had been part of a late 19th century, early 20th century group of forts and batteries designed to protect Lisbon, known as the Campo Entrincheirado (Entrenched Field). Of the eight batteries, one is now sealed underneath a new hospital although one of the three guns has been preserved, four are in ruins, two were donated to different bodies, and one is a museum. In addition, there was a separate command centre. Following the coastline from the north, the batteries were:

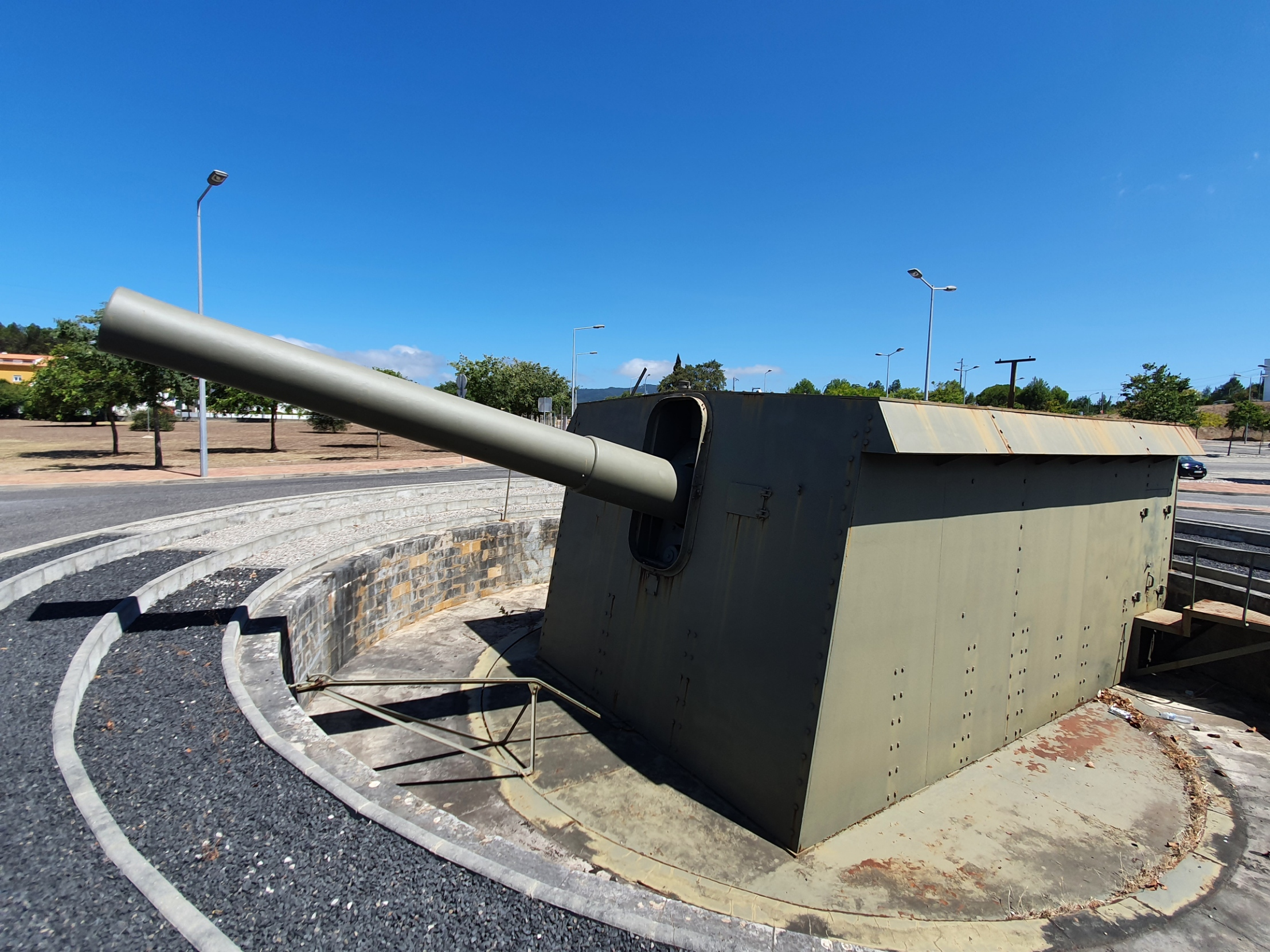
Vickers 23.4cm gun at the First Battery

- Battery 1. (38°43′53″N 9°25′08″W). A battery in Alcabideche, Lisbon District, about 4km from the sea, equipped with three 23.4cm Vickers guns, with counter bombardment responsibilities. The British government originally proposed four guns, but the Portuguese government settled for three, for reasons of cost. Firing such large guns close to an urban area often caused damage, such as broken windows.
- Battery 2. (38°41′48″N 9°21′36″W). A close-defence battery at Parede in Lisbon District, with three 15.2cm Vickers guns. This was the first fort to be completed.
- Battery 3. (38°41′10″N 9°18′32″W). Further towards Lisbon, the Bataria da Lage was a defence battery against small naval vessels, with three 15cm Krupp guns.
- Battery 4. (38°41′32″N 9°13′04″W). A further defence battery at the early 19th-century Fort of Bom Sucesso in Belém, close to Lisbon, with two 5.6cm guns from Vickers.
- Battery 5. (38°40′00″N 9°14′11″W). South of the Tagus, at Raposeira, this was a close defence battery with three 15cm Krupp guns.
- Battery 6. (38°35′19″N 9°11′51″W). On the Atlantic coast south of the Tagus was the battery of Raposa, with three 23.4cm Vickers guns, with the same functions as the Alcabideche battery. As with Battery 1, it is said that ten soldiers were required to fire each gun.
- Battery 7. (38°29′22″N 8°56′18″W). On the south coast of the Setúbal peninsula, the battery of Outão was a close defence battery equipped with three 15.2cm Vickers guns.
- Battery 8. (38°30′43″N 8°54′46″W). The final battery was that of Albarquel, which guarded the Sado estuary and the entrance to Setúbal with three 15cm Krupp guns.

In addition to the batteries, the plan envisaged the use of naval mines and two booms laid across river entrances.

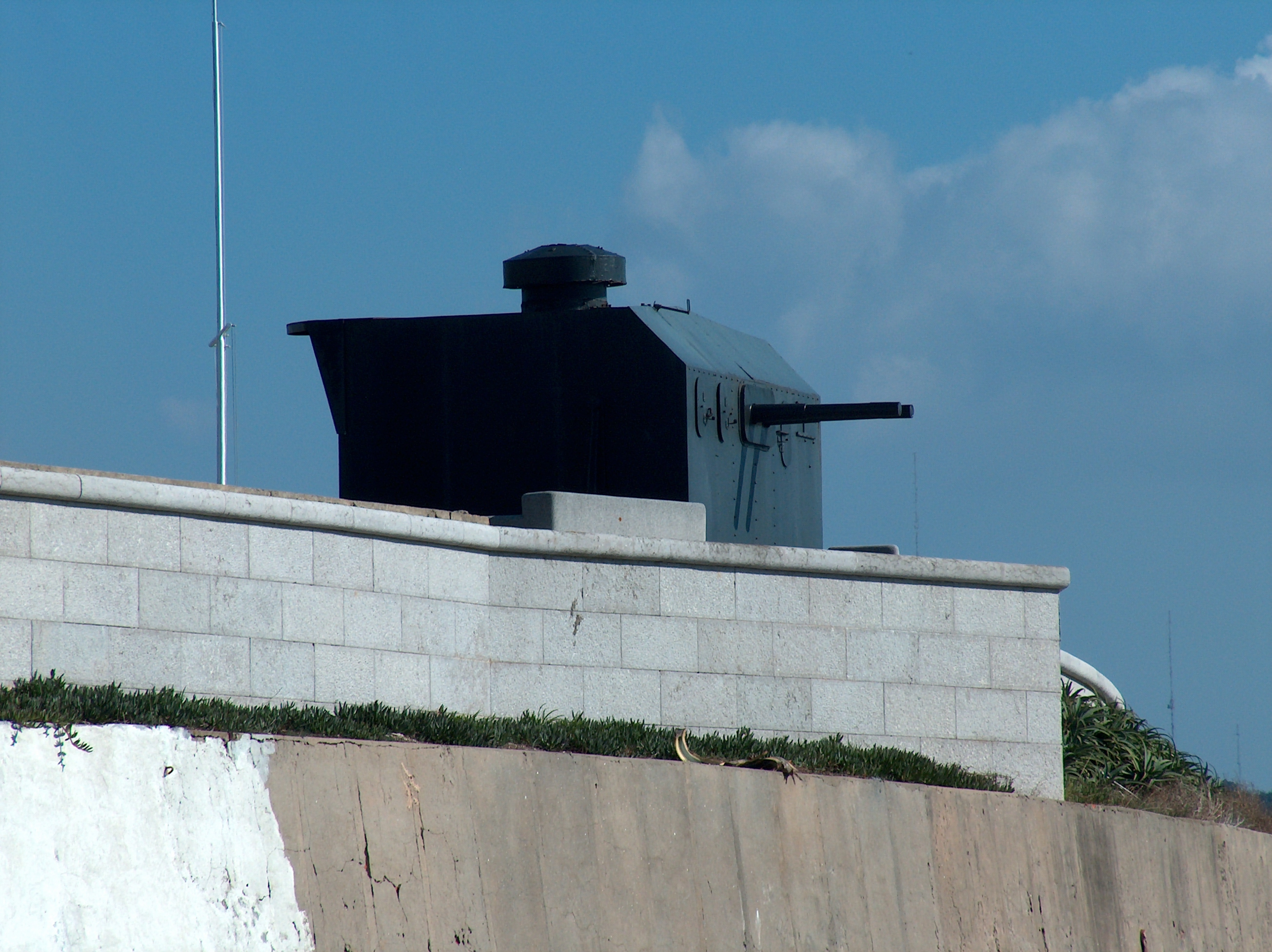
Fort of Bom Sucesso

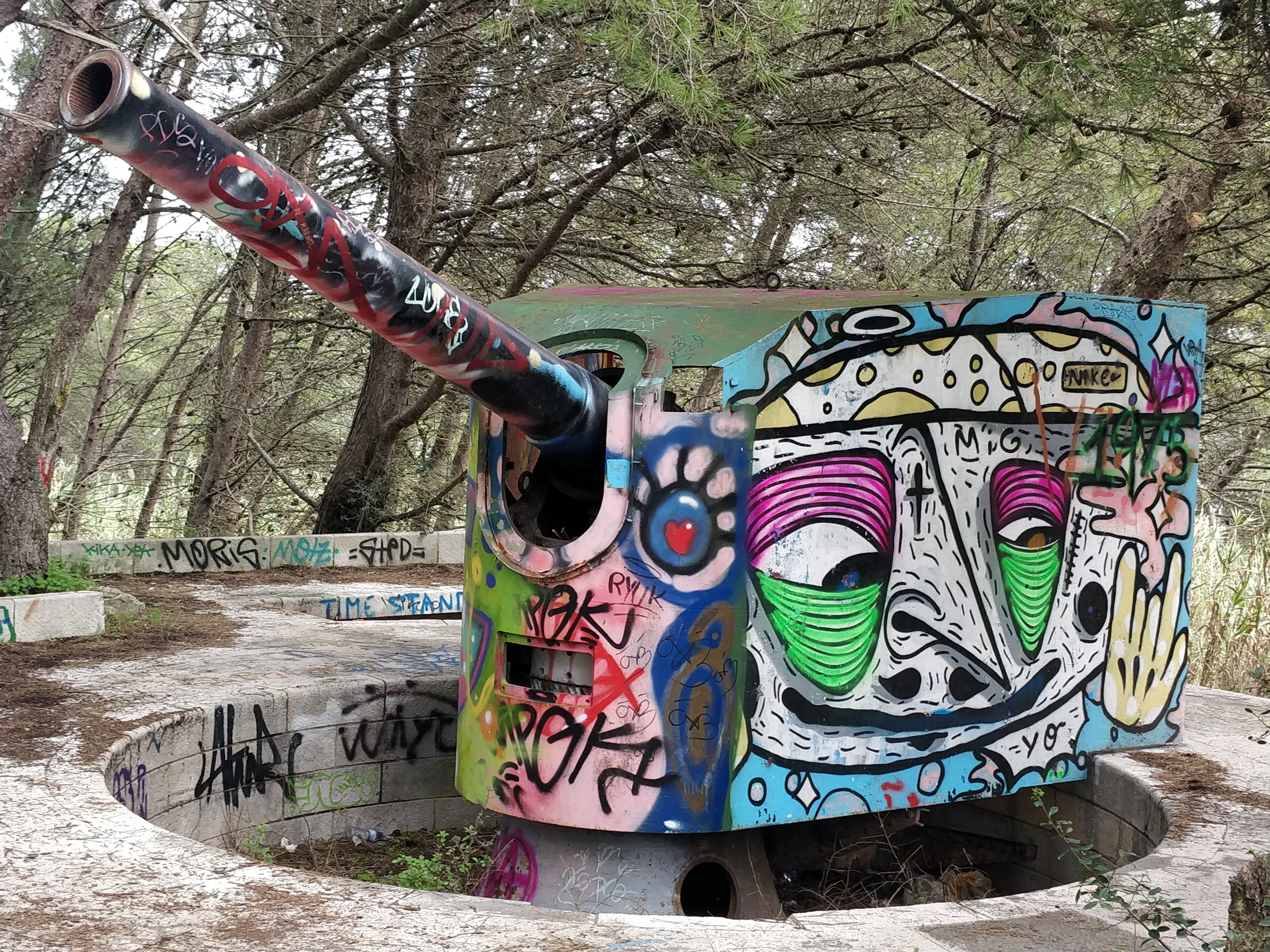
Gun at Raposeira near Trafaria, south of the Tagus river

== Present condition ==
Some of the Barron Plan batteries are well-preserved but others have been neglected. In the case of Battery 1, a new hospital for Cascais was built on the site. In building the hospital it was necessary to destroy the bunkers that formed part of the battery. However, these were so strong that the attempt to blow up the first one utilised the entire budget for explosives for the construction. Designs were altered, the bunkers were sealed and the hospital was built on top of them. One of the guns has been retained as the centrepiece of a roundabout in the hospital car park. Battery 2 was neglected but as of the end of 2023 very limited progress was being made to restore the site and open a museum and theme park devoted to coastal artillery. Battery 3 is well-maintained and forms part of a complex, including a restaurant, run by the Commandos Association. The Fort of Bom Sucesso (Battery 4) is situated on the edge of the major tourist area of Belém and its future seems assured. It contains a museum run by the League of Combatants. Battery 5, on the south of the Tagus, is in a very ruined condition. Battery 6, the Battery of Raposa, at Fonte da Telha on the Atlantic, is well-maintained but can only be visited by appointment. Battery 7 on the south coast of the Setúbal peninsula is very ruined and vandalized but there were also plans in 2023 to exploit its tourism potential. Battery 8 has also been neglected. The land has been sold to a private developer.
