= Chaimite, Mozambique =

Village in Gaza Province, Mozambique

Chaimite
- Village
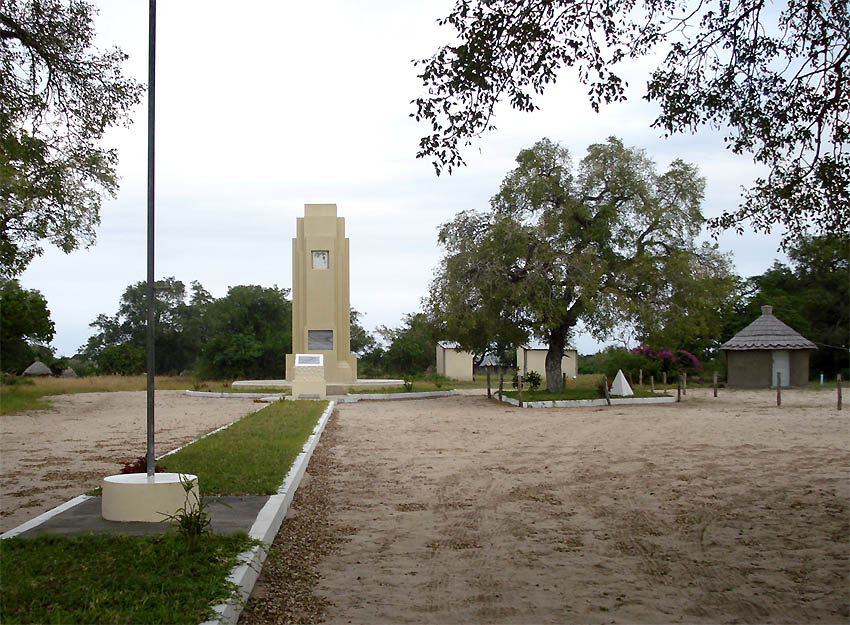
- Monument to Gungunhana
- Interactive map of Chaimite
- Coordinates: 24°39′21″S 33°18′57″E
- Country: Mozambique
- Province: Gaza
- Time zone: UTC+2:00 (CAT)
- Postal code: 1208

Chaimite is a village sacred to the Nguni people of the Gaza Empire, currently in Gaza Province, Mozambique. In the area in January 1896, Gungunhana, the last emperor of Gaza, was imprisoned by the Portuguese Empire.
