= Fort of Bom Sucesso =

Fort in Portugal

- Forte do Bom Success
- Part of Belém
- Lisbon District, Near Lisbon in Portugal
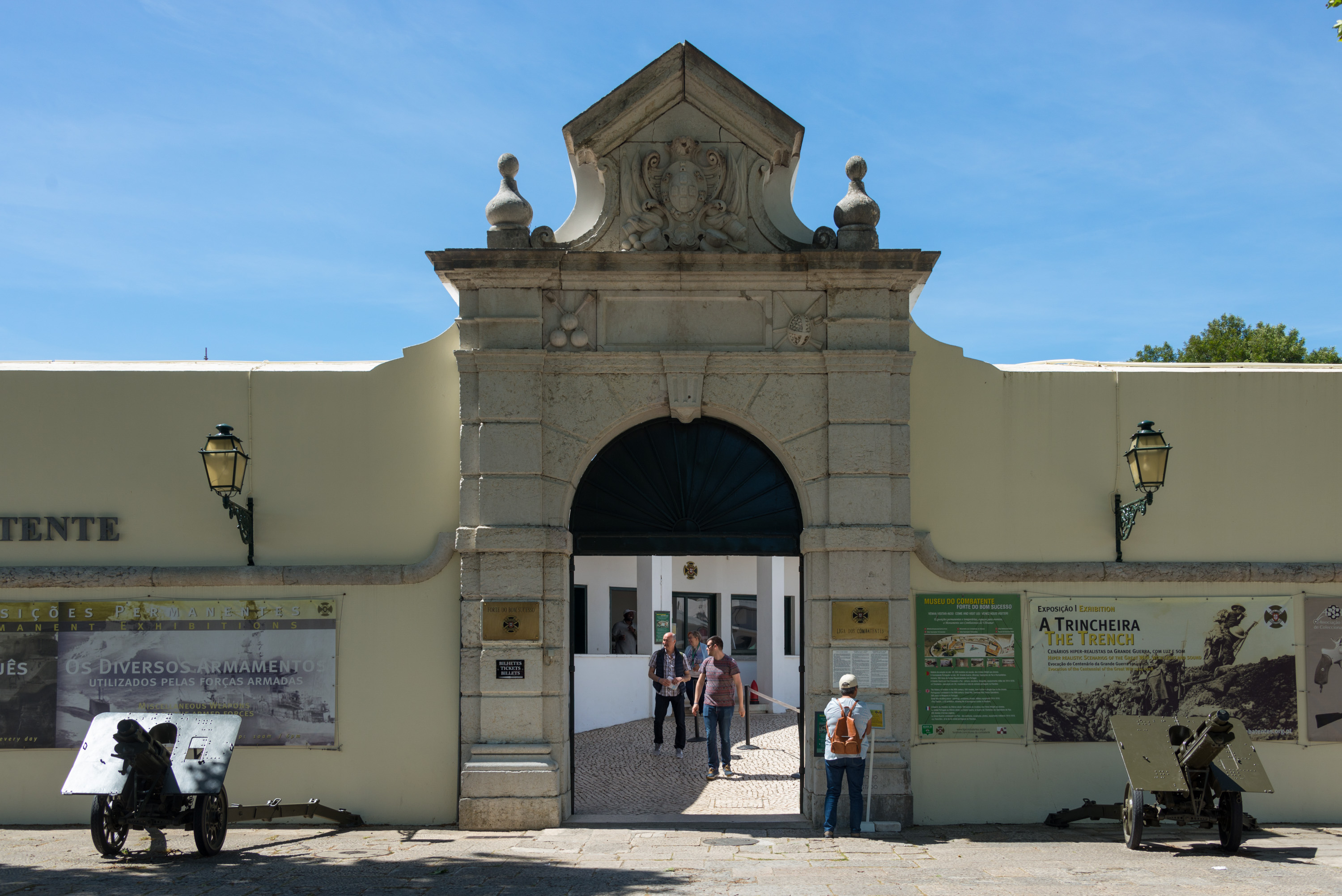
- View of the entrance to the fort

Site information
- Type: Bastion Fort
- Open to the public: Yes

Location
- Coordinates: 38°41′32″N 9°13′04″W

Site history
- Built: 1802 (rebuilt 1870)
- Fate: Well-preserved

Garrison information
- Occupants: Portuguese League of Combatants

The Fort of Bom Sucesso (Portuguese: Forte do Bom Sucesso) is located slightly to the west of the Belém Tower in Belém in the municipality of Lisbon, in Portugal. It now houses the Museu do Combatente (Combatant’s museum) and the Monument to Overseas Combatants.

== History ==
Construction of the fort, which follows a polygonal outline on the right bank of the River Tagus, was started in 1780 under the direction of General Guilherme de Vallerée. A residence for the governor of the fort was added soon after, within the perimeter. On the basis of an inscription over the main entrance, it appears that the fort was completed in 1802.

In 1808, during the occupation of Lisbon by French forces commanded by Marshal Junot, the fort was connected to the Belém Tower by an artillery battery, known as the left flank battery. In 1815, after the French had been defeated, a right flank was added.

By 1836 the fort was in ruins and it was effectively abandoned until 1870. It underwent extensive modernization between 1870 and 1874, after which it received two Krupp 28 cm Haubitze L/12 howitzers, and became one of a number of forts, known as the Campo Entrincheirado (Entrenched Field) of Lisbon, that formed a defensive perimeter that followed the boundaries of Lisbon at the time. Later, its defence consisted of five 120mm Schneider pieces. During the failed coup attempt of 18 May, 1925, an attempt was made to attack the fort.

During the Portuguese Colonial War (1961 – 1975) the Fort of Bom Sucesso served as the headquarters of the Military Postal Service. It was also one of the eight batteries under the Barron Plan for the defence of Lisbon and Setúbal, with two 5.6cm guns. After the Carnation Revolution on 25 April 1974, which overthrew the authoritarian Estado Novo regime, it hosted the Command of the Military Intervention Group, a body set up by the Revolutionary Council to maintain law and order. Later it was the headquarters of the Association of 25th of April, an organization that brought together the members of the military who initiated the Carnation Revolution.

== The Combatant’s Museum ==
On January 13, 1999, the fort was officially handed over to the Portuguese League of Combatants, which manages the museum. It offers a permanent exhibition indoors, as well as three external areas with equipment related to the various branches of the Armed Forces. The permanent exhibition covers World War I, the colonial campaigns (known in Portugal as the overseas campaigns), and peace missions. The museum also has social areas, conference and projection rooms, and a bar.
