= Sacavém e Prior Velho =

- Civil parish
- Location in Portugal
- Coordinates: 38.793°N 9.108°W
- Country: Portugal
- Region: Lisbon
- Metropolitan area: Lisbon
- District: Lisbon
- Municipality: Loures

Area
  - Total: 3.89 km^{2} (1.50 sq mi)

Population (2011)
  - Total: 24,822
  - Density: 6,400/km^{2} (17,000/sq mi)
- Time zone: UTC+00:00 (WET)
  - Summer (DST): UTC+01:00 (WEST)

Sacavém e Prior Velho is a civil parish in the municipality of Loures, Portugal. It was formed in 2013 by the merger of the former parishes Sacavém and Prior Velho. The population in 2011 was 24,822, in an area of 3.89 km².

== See also ==
- History of Sacavém
- Sacavém
