= Sacavém =

- Civil parish
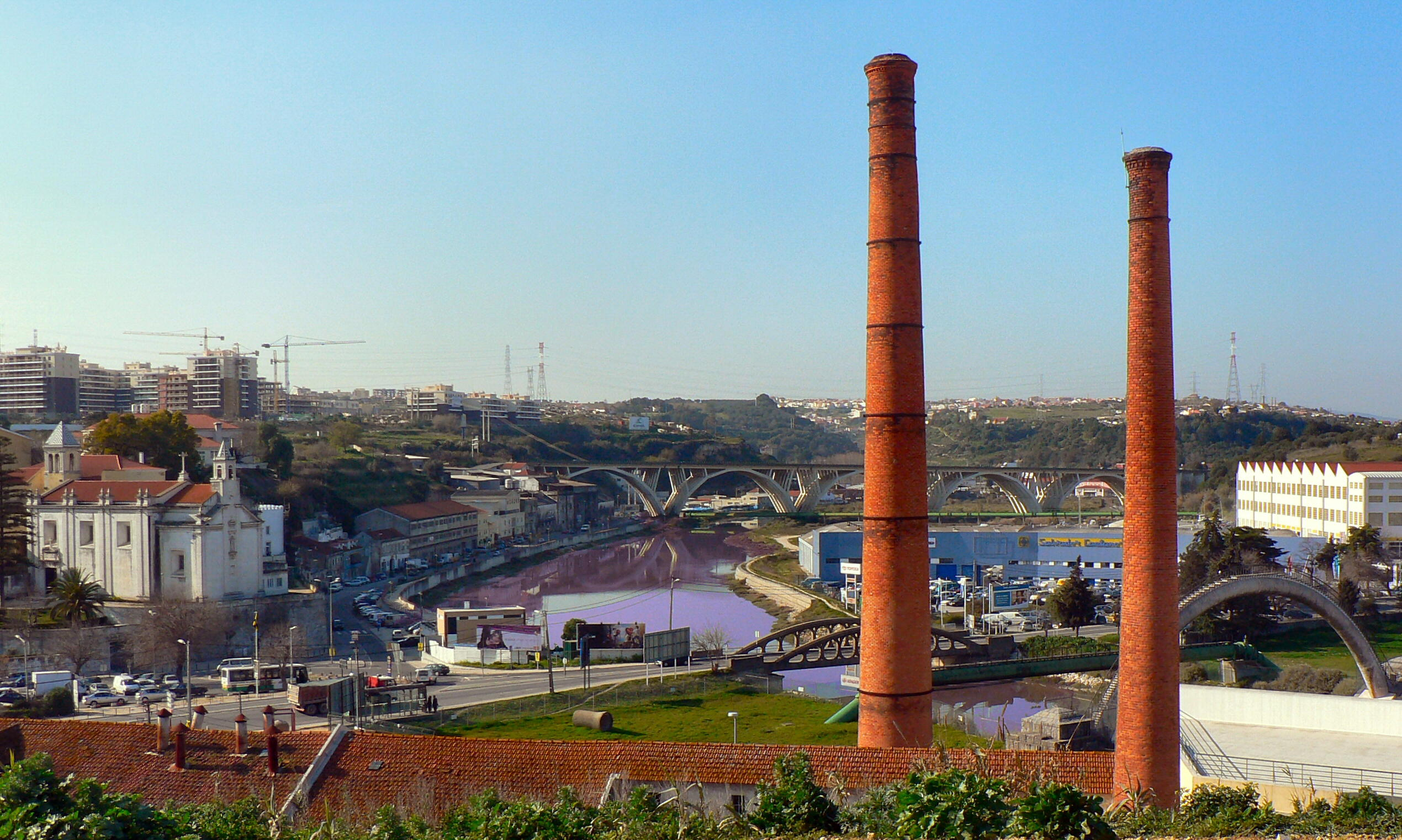
- The Trancão River winding through the heart of Sacavém

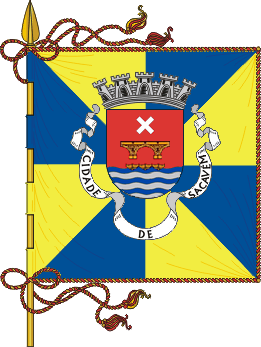
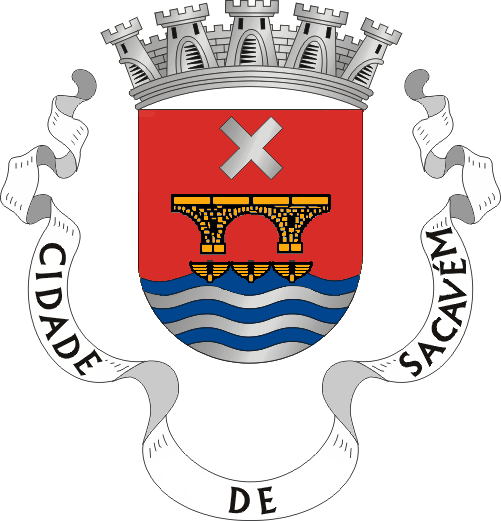
- Flag Coat of arms
- Interactive map of Sacavém
- Location within Portugal Location within Europe
- Coordinates: 38°47′40″N 9°6′19″W
- Country: Portugal
- Region: Lisbon
- Metropolitan area: Lisbon
- District: Lisbon
- Municipality: Loures
- Established: Parish: before 1191; Town: 7 December 1927; City: 4 June 1997

Area
  - Total: 4.09 km^{2} (1.58 sq mi)
- Elevation: 25 m (82 ft)

Population (2001)
  - Total: 17,659
  - Density: 4,320/km^{2} (11,200/sq mi)
- Time zone: UTC+00:00 (WET)
  - Summer (DST): UTC+01:00 (WEST)
- Postal code: 2685-099
- Patron: Nossa Senhora da Purificação
- Website: http://www.jfsacavem.pt

Sacavém (European Portuguese: [sɐkɐˈvɐ̃j]; Arabic: شقبان, romanized: Shaqbān) is a city and former civil parish in the municipality of Loures, Lisbon District, Portugal. In 2013, the parish merged into the new parish Sacavém e Prior Velho. It is a few kilometers north-east of the Portuguese capital, Lisbon. The civil parish covers an area of 4.09 km^{2} (1.6 sq mi), and included as of 2001 census a resident population of 17,659 inhabitants. The region is known for its famous ceramics industry.

== History ==
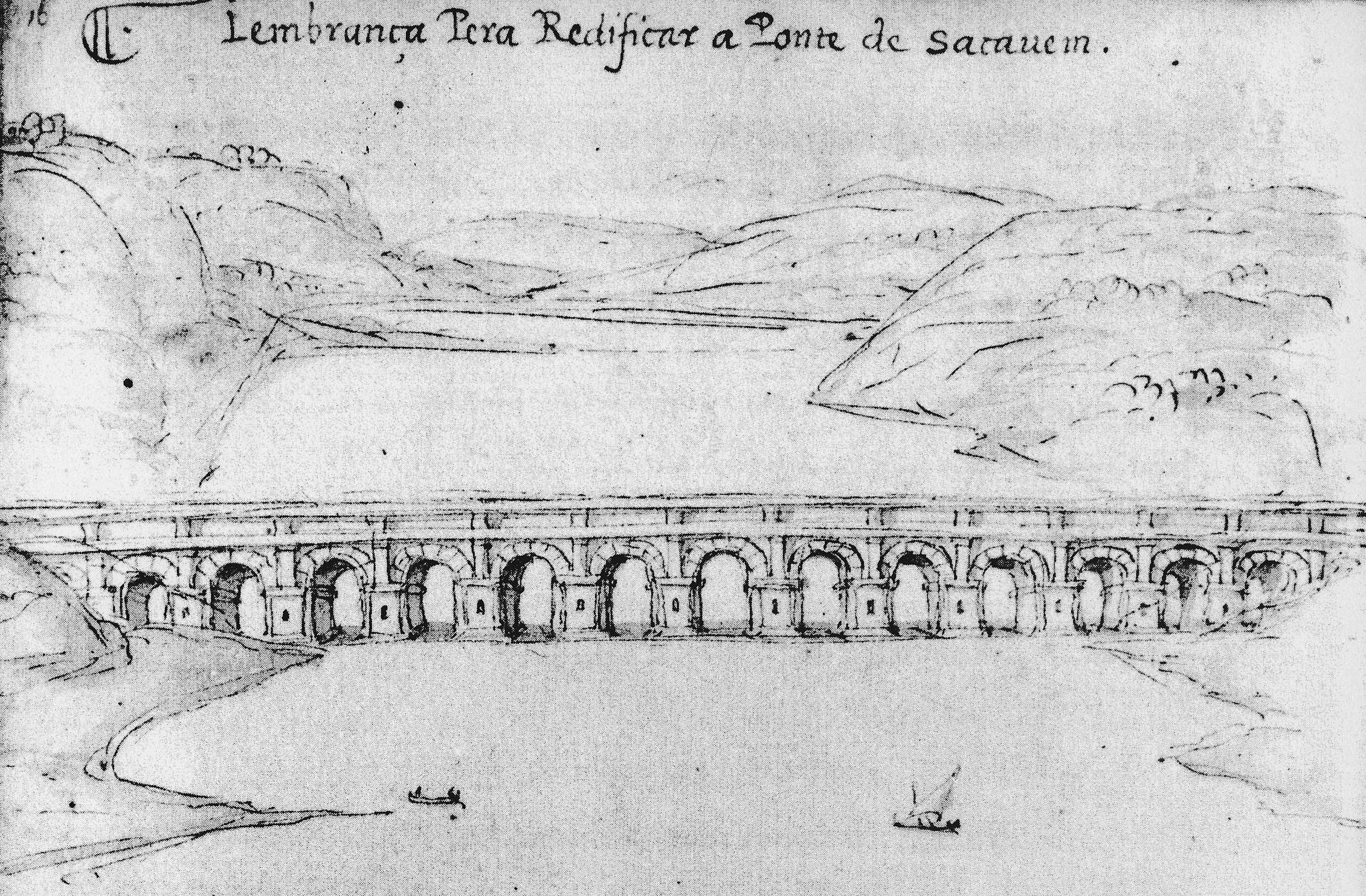
The Roman bridge of Sacavém, drawn by Francisco de Holanda (c.1571) in Da fábrica que falece a cidade de Lisboa

Due to its strategic location, at the intersection of several roads from the north and east connecting to Lisbon, Sacavém was an important settlement during periods of Portuguese History, with some evidence extending back to pre-history. The Portuguese historian Pinho Leal wrote, in his chorography Portugal Antigo & Moderno (Ancient & Modern Portugal), that "Sacavém is incontestably a very old settlement, and already existed in the time of the Romans". The oldest-known references date back to the Neolithic and Chalcolithic: three polished stone axes were discovered from the Bronze Age, and in the mid-1980s, excavations in the historical centre of the city revealed a cave with similar artifacts from this period.

By the first century, Sacavém was already crossed by two major Roman roads that connected the region with the interior of the Iberian Peninsula:

- Via XV, connecting Olissipona (Lisbon) and Emerita Augusta (Mérida), by way of the important administrative centre of Scalabicastrum, today Santarém; and
- Via XVI, which connected Olissipona to Bracara Augusta (Braga), capital of the Conventus bracarensis in the province of Gallaecia).

Remnants of these two Roman viæ still exist under the modern roads Rua do António Ricardo Rodrigues and Rua do José Luís de Morais (the town's two main streets during the Middle Ages, which connected the upper and lower districts of Sacavém). Even during this period Sacavém was an important river-crossing; the Romans built a bridge that remained active until the 17th century (according to several sources, such as Francisco de Holanda or Miguel Leitão de Andrade). This bridge was a natural continuation of the roads and connected Sacavém with the northern river bank; therefore indirectly included in the famous Antonine Itinerary. The parish's coat-of-arms includes a symbolic depiction of the Roman bridge. Also in the vicinity, an epigraphic inscription is said to have existed (nowadays unknown), but referred to in the Corpus Inscriptionum Latinarum). Various epigraphs have suggested that this totem identified the Roman magisterial administration of the rural locality.

The Roman colony, which was centred on the bridge, was eventually succeeded by barbarians from south-eastern peninsula. The Alans were the first to occupy these lands (but left few remnants), and later the Visigoths, who constructed a chapel dedicated to Nossa Senhora dos Prazeres, on the sight of the medieval-era Chapel of Nossa Senhora da Vitória (Our Lady of Victory).

=== Moorish rule ===
After 711, the Moors occupied the Iberian peninsula; Lisbon (Arabic: al-Ušbuna) is taken in 716 by Berbers under the command of Abd al-Aziz ibn Musa (who received the governorship of Al-Andalus, in the name of the Umayyad Caliphate of Damascus), who also captured the region of Sacavém. Much like other areas of the Al-Garb Al-Andalus (much of ancient Roman Lusitania), the peoples under Moorish dominion became bi-lingual, while maintaining their Christian faith (not converting until much later). In Sacavém the community that circled the Church of Nossa Senhora dos Prazeres maintained their faith and culture (under the bishop of Lisbon), something that was possible due to the religious tolerance of the invaders to the Ahl al-Kitāb (or People of the Book). It is likely that the medieval tower in Sacavém de Cima, in the Largo do Terreirinho, fronting the Chapel of Senhora da Saúde (in the historic centre of the settlement) originated during this Muslim period, when the local Christians were required to pay jizya.

The modern name Sacavém might have come from the Arabic language; for many years experts believed that it came from the word šagabi (next or in the neighbourhood – in this case, of Lisbon, an important city even during Moorish period) Latinised to sacabis, -is, becoming sacabem in the accusative case, and hence, by phonetic modifications during the centuries, Sacavém. Recent investigations, from Arabic sources (namely Yaqut's Kitab Mu'jam Al-Buldan), indicate that the Muslims used the word Šaqabān (Arabic: شقبان), incredibly similar to the modern Portuguese pronunciation.

During Al-Andalus, Sacavém was considered a qarya (one of the settlements of al-Ušbuna), but it was administratively integrated into the larger settlement (geographically limited by the Roman conventus), which was governed by the military governor in Cordova, later by the emirs (756–929) and caliphs (929–1031) that governed Al-Andalus. Various seditions against the Umayyad Caliphate rose-up in the emirs and caliphates of Al-Garb Al-Andalus; the revolts of Ibn Marwan of Mérida/Badajoz or Umār ibn Hafsūn of Bobastro corresponds to a period of weak central government, when the Al Garb was a nominal extension of the Caliphate, an autonomous principality with its seat in Batalyaws (Badajoz).

It was in the period of turmoil preceding the fall of the Caliphates (in 1031) that Sacavém was integrated into the Kingdom of Badajoz (except for a decade around 1020 when it was a part of al-Ušbuna, under ʿAbd al-ʿAziz ibn Sabūr and ʿAbd al-Malik ibn Sabūr (sons of Sabūr al-Saqlabi, a Slavic serf who sparked a revolt in against Caliph Al-Hakam II). This would last until the Aftasids conquered the region. In 1093, in a trade for aid against the Almoravids (from the Maghreb), the emir of Badajoz ceded to the imperator totius Hispaniæ Alfonso VI of León and Castile the castles of al-Ušbuna and aš-Šantaryin (Santarém), along with the territory of Sacavém. But the regions return to Christianity lasted for a short time; in 1095, with the advance of the Almoravid forces, led by Yusuf ibn Tashfin, Count Raymond of Galicia was defeated in battle, resulting in the Arab-Christian frontier advancing from the Tagus River to the Mondego. By 1144, the Al-Garb led by Ibn Qasi revolted against the Almoravids. Although the Almoravids were dominant in the first few years, they were in decline when Afonso I of Portugal definitively captured Lisbon (al-Ušbuna) in October 1147.

=== Middle Ages ===
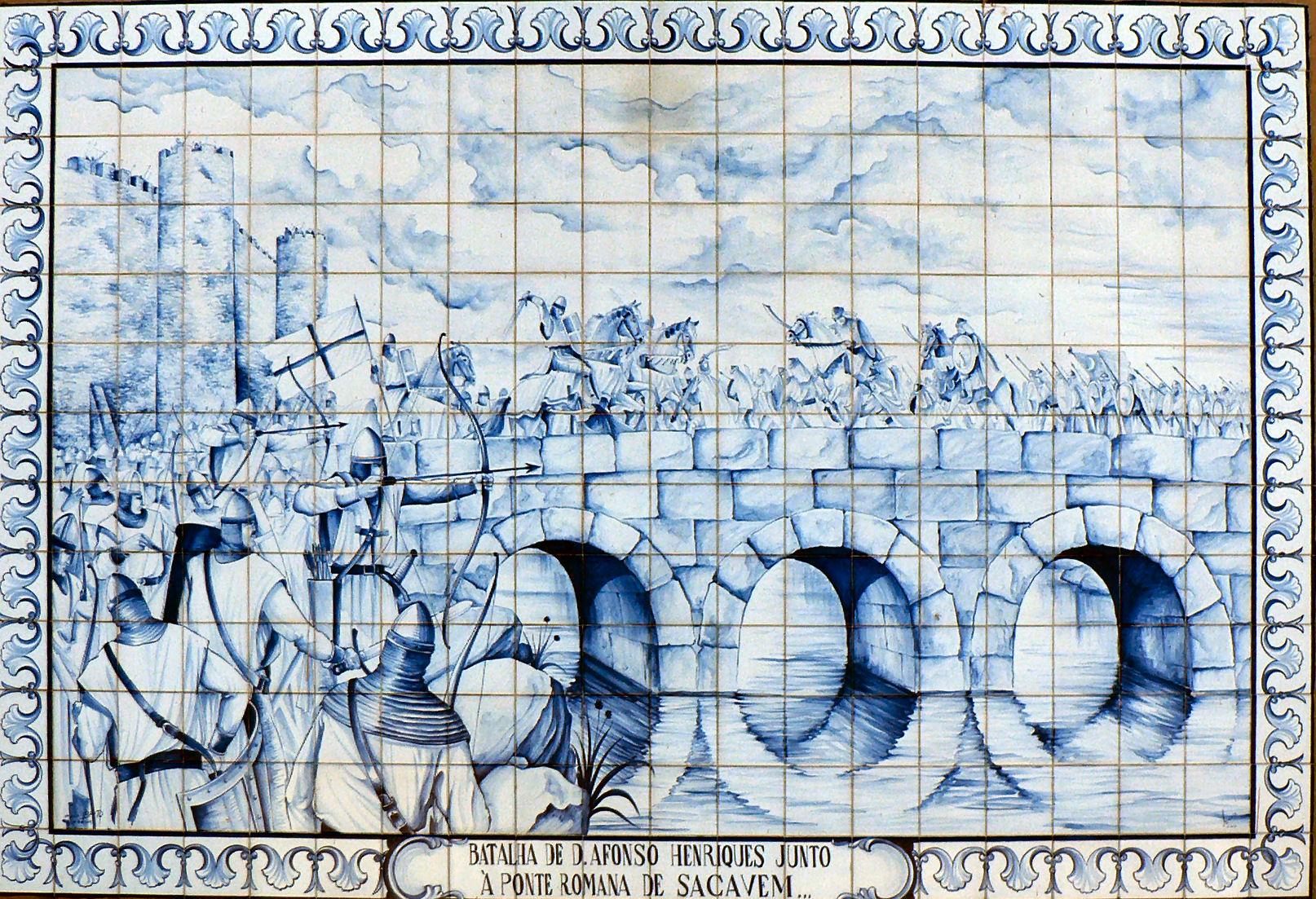
Afonso Henriques in battle, near the Roman bridge in Sacavém

According to an old legend, it was near the bank of the Trancão that the mythical battle of Sacavém river took place, between King Afonso I of Portugal and the Moors, in October 1147. The tradition (fixed probably in the 16th century) says that the Moorish people had gathered around 5,000 men from all Estremadura (Alenquer, Óbidos, Tomar, Torres Novas and Torres Vedras) to fight against only 1,500 Christians, but the latter defeated the Muslims in a large blood bath, with this wondrous victory personally attributed to the intervention of the Holy Virgin, which brought many Christians speaking strange languages (this is, the crusades that took Lisbon that same year).

The legend says also that the Moorish leader Bezai Zaide had even converted to Christianity and became the first priest at the Chapel of Our Lady of Martyrs (Portuguese: Capela de Nossa Senhora de Mártires) that Afonso Henriques ordered to be built just a few days after the clash. On the other hand, the first Portuguese monarch had also ordered the rebuilding of the old Visigoth Chapel of Our Lady of Pleasures (Portuguese: Capela de Nossa Senhora de Prazeres), ruined during the Moorish rule (although Christian faith in Al-Andalus was allowed by the emirs against the payment of a tribute). This church was dedicated to Our Lady of Victory (Portuguese: Nossa Senhora da Vítoria), and became the seat of the ecclesiastical parish.

However, the first documented mention of Sacavém is in 1191 (forty-four years after the conquest), in a paper signed by King Sancho I of Portugal.

Pinho Leal reported that in the 12th century Sacavém was a parish with 900 houses, but this number is, however, is regarded today as too high for that time. During the 13th century, it seems that in Sacavém there existed an important Jewish community, living in a ghetto outside the parish.

In 1288, the priest of Sacavém was one of the signatories of a letter requesting that the Pope Nicholas IV install a university in Lisbon.

At the end of the 14th century, king Ferdinand I of Portugal donated Sacavém to his wife Leonor Telles de Menezes. Although the place belonged at that time thus to the sphere of influence of the queen-consort, it supported the later King John I of Portugal in his struggle for power. Therefore, after his triumph in 1385, Sacavém was administratively included in Lisbon, but donated to the major supporter of the new king, Nuno Álvares Pereira. Later, by the wedding of his daughter to the first Duke of Braganza, Sacavém became a property of the powerful House of Braganza.

São João da Talha, until then known as Sacavém Extra-Muros (Sacavém outside the walls) became an independent parish, split from Sacavém in 1387.

In the Late Middle Ages, several chronicles (such as those of Duarte Nunes de Leão and Rui de Pina) mentioned Sacavém. These two chroniclers stated that the royal family, before the conquest of Ceuta in 1415, fled to Sacavém, in order to escape from the plague that arose in Lisbon. There the queen-consort Philippa of Lancaster died of the plague, her body was carried to Batalha Monastery where her remains were buried. However, another chronicler, Gomes Eanes de Zurara reports that the royal family fled to Odivelas (and therefore not to Sacavém), and that the queen died there.

=== The Modern Era ===
The Fort of Sacavém was built in 1892 as the easternmost of a line of forts designed to circle Lisbon, known as the "Entrenched Field of Lisbon" (Campo Entrincheirado de Lisboa). It now houses important government archives. Taking advantage of its proximity to the River Tagus and opportunities presented by the opening of a railway line to the north of Lisbon, Sacavém became an important area for Portugal's industrial development from the middle of the 19th century. The first significant factory, the Fábrica da Loiça, produced crockery and ceramics. Now closed, it is now celebrated at the Ceramics Museum of Sacavém, which also has a documentation centre covering the industrial development of the town.

Sacavém was the site of Portugal's first fatal aviation accident on June 13, 1913. Giovanni Manio lost control of his Blériot monoplane at 450 feet during a display flight, being thrown from the cockpit and fatally striking his propeller before he hit the ground. The plane was written off.

== Geography ==
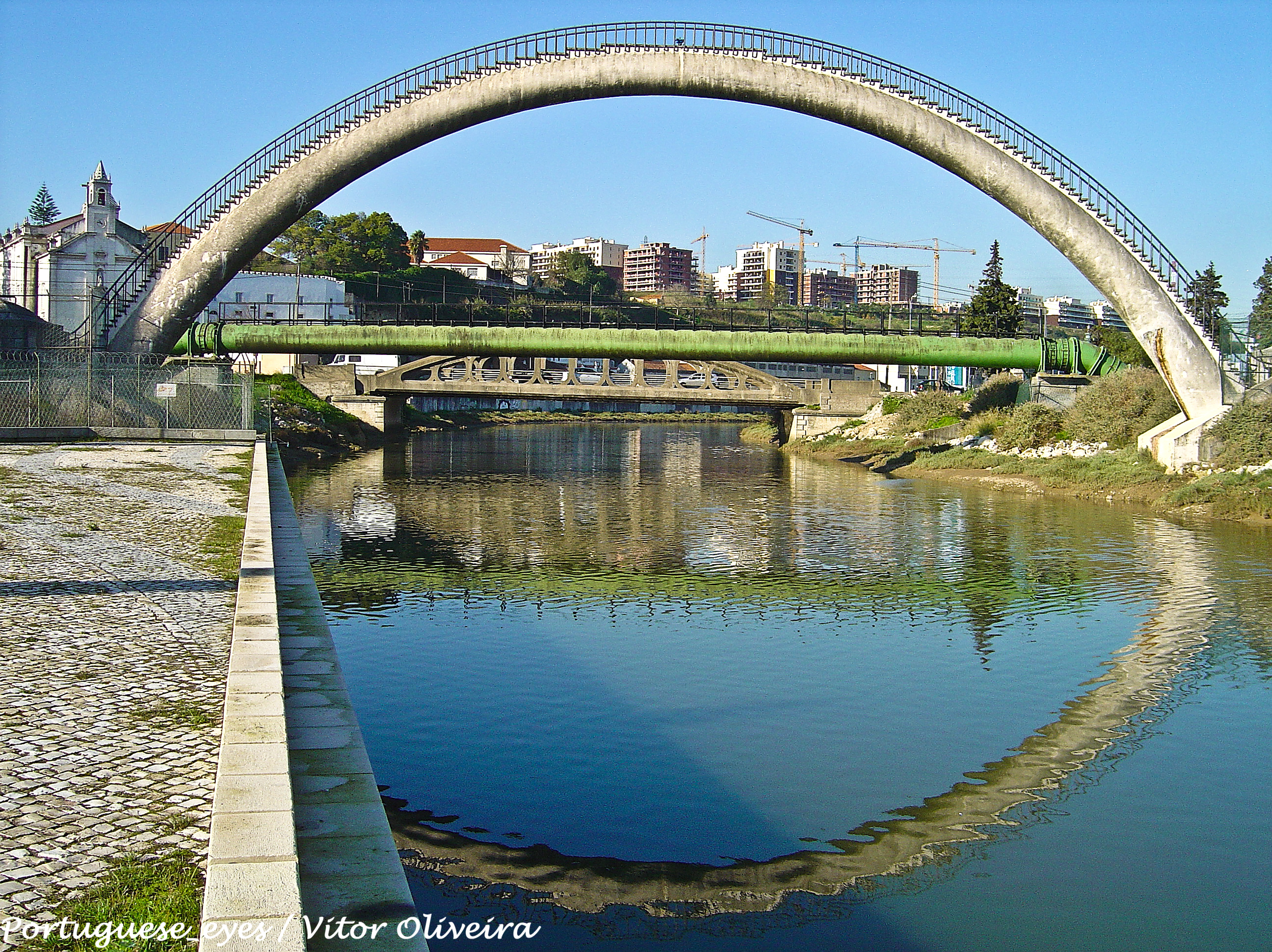
Several bridges are necessary to cross the town's rivers, including the Sacavém Arch footbridge across the Trancão

Sacavém is located in the eastern part of Loures municipality, bordering the parishes of Unhos (northwest), Camarate (west), Prior Velho (southwest), Portela (south) as well as Moscavide (southeast). To the east lies the Tagus River, and to north the Trancão River (formerly known as Sacavém River), separating Sacavém from Bobadela parish. The Ribeira do Prior Velho, also flows through the city crossing it in underground channels.

The parish's terrain is relatively flat. The northern bank of the Tagus is approximately at sea level, while the border of Sacavém with the parishes of Camarate and Unhos is 60 meters (197 ft) above the sea. However, there are several hills such as Monte Cintra and Monte do Convento (both reaching about 30 m or 98 ft in height).

Traditionally, Sacavém has been divided in two areas:

- Sacavém de Cima (Upper Sacavém), comprising the historical center of the town, around the Capela de Nossa Senhora da Saúde e de Santo André (Chapel of Our Lady of Health and Saint Andrew);
- Sacavém de Baixo (Lower Sacavém), near the bank of the Trancão River, where the parochial Church and the old monastery of the Order of Poor Clares are situated.

In the last few decades, besides these two urban areas, new urban agglomerations have emerged, such as Courela do Foguete, Fonte Perra, Olival Covo, Quinta do Património and Real Forte, as well as Terraços da Ponte. The latter area replaced the old and much degraded Quinta do Mocho zone, which was the centre an African emigrant community, from the former Portuguese colonies, that returned to Portugal after the Carnation Revolution in 1974, and whom lived in poor conditions, over the past three decades.

== Architecture ==
The parish of Sacavém is region of several nationally and regionally recognizable architectural monuments, although many are not classified as architecturally significant under the auspices of the IGESPAR designations. Many of these structures include buildings dating back to the Baroque and late medieval period of Portuguese growth.

=== Civic ===
- Arch of Largo do Olaio (Portuguese: Arco Brasonado no Largo do Olaio); an 18th- and 19th-century entrance to the Cabrias family estate;
- Barrio of Quinta da Vitória (Portuguese: Bairro da Quinta da Vitória)
- Residence Largo Pedro Gomes Junior (Portuguese: Casa com platibanda no Largo Pedro gomes Júnior); 18th-century residence with dependencies within walls, adapted for bourgeois use;
- Residence Quinta de São José (Portuguese: Casa da Quinta de São José), a residence located on the grounds of the São José estate, with ceilings of painted wood and silars of figurative azueljo;
- Residence Praça da Republica, No.18–21 (Portuguese: Casa na Praça da República, Nº18-21), a striking salmon-colored residence designed in the 20th century;
- Residence Praceta D. João I (Portuguese: Casa na Praceta D. João I), the ruins of a large signeurial house, in an advance state of ruin, but dating to the 19th or early 20th century;
- Residence Rua Tenente Possidónio Coelho, No.14–18 (Portuguese: Casa na Rua Tenente Possidónio Coelho), another 20th-century two-storey residence, integrated into a concentrated urban environment;

=== Religious ===
- Convent of the Poor Clares and Church of Nossa Senhora da Purificação (Portuguese: Antigo Convento das Clarissas/Igreja Paroquial de Sacavém/Igreja de Nossa Senhora da Purificação/Comando e Estado Maior do Batalhão de Adidos), the Mannerist architecture devoted originally to the monastery of the Poor Clares Xabreganas, and later operated by the Ministry of War, before being plans were established to convert the spaces into commercial and leisure services, a civic centre and local Junta de Freguesia;

== See also ==
- Quinta do Mocho murals, a public art project in Sacavém
- History of Sacavém
