= Castle of Pirescoxe =

Castle in Portugal

Coordinates: 38.8370842°N 9.0917047°W

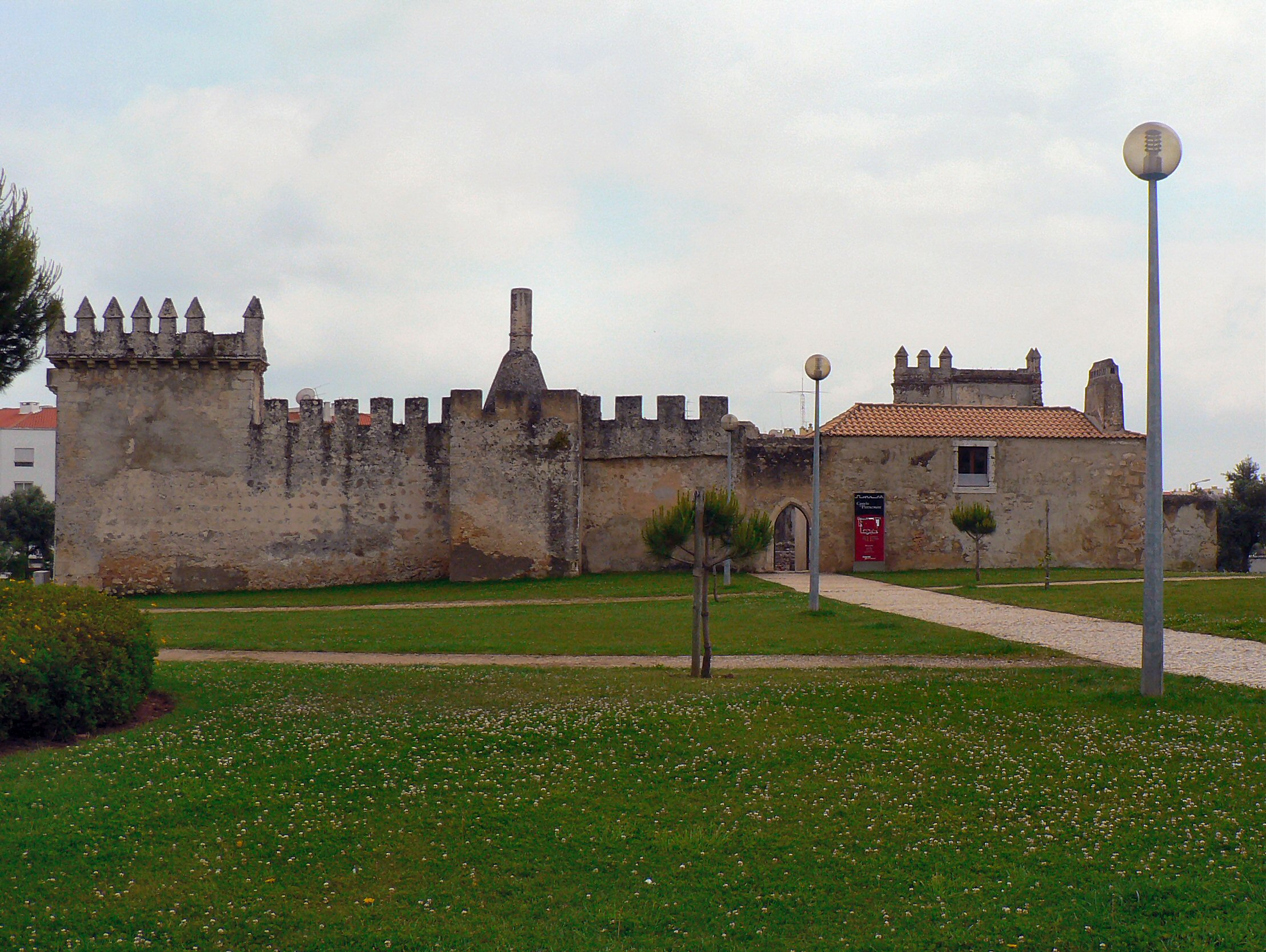
The Castle of Pirescoxe in 2007

The Castle of Pirescoxe is a castle located in Santa Iria de Azoia, in the municipality of Loures, Portugal. It is classified by IGESPAR as a site of public interest.
