= Bruno Nunes (politician) =

Portuguese businessman and politician

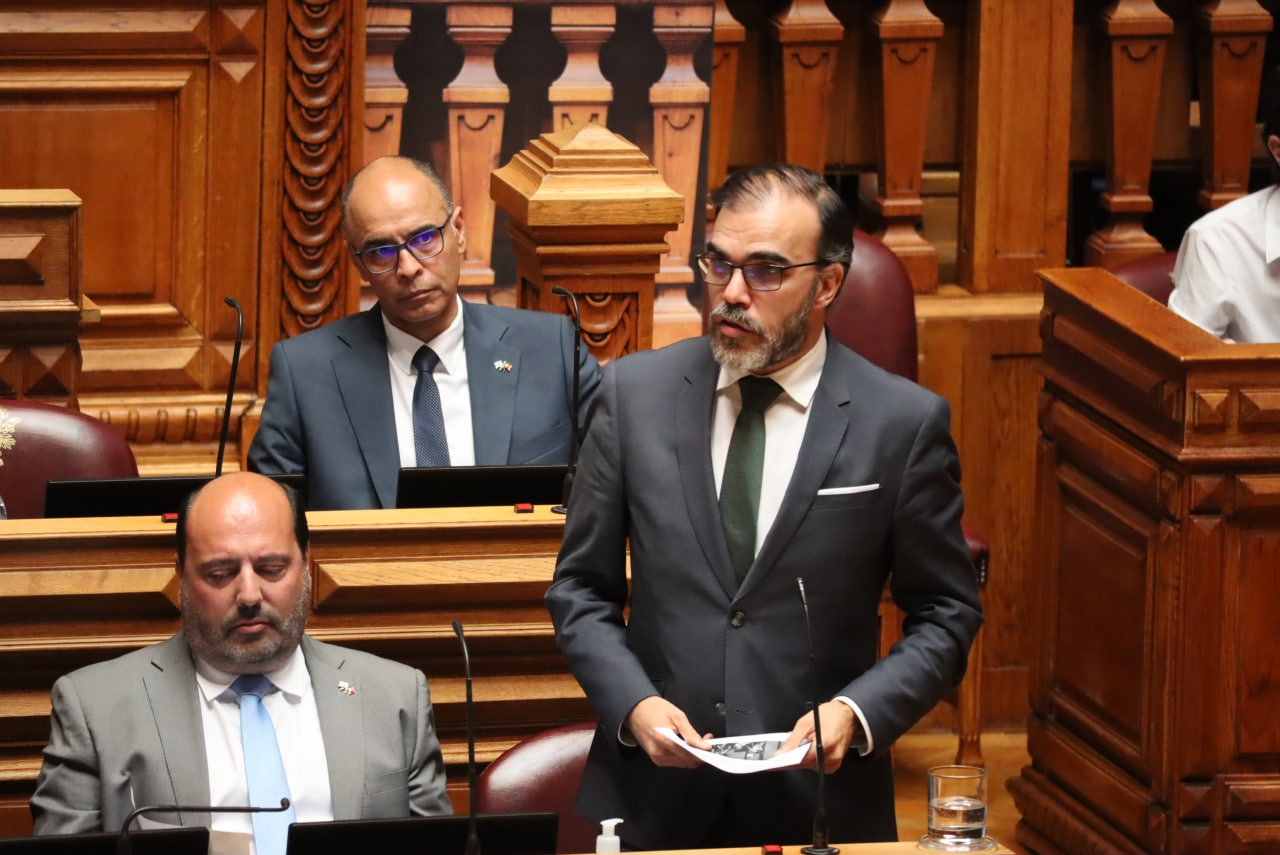

Member of the Assembly of the Republic
- Incumbent
- Assumed office 29 March 2022
- Constituency: Setúbal (2022–2024); Lisbon (2024–present)

Member of the Loures City Council
- Incumbent
- Assumed office 15 October 2021

Personal details
- Born: Bruno Miguel de Oliveira Nunes; 16 November 1976 (age 49) Sesimbra, Portugal
- Party: Chega (since 2019)
- Other political affiliations: People's Monarchist Party (2014–2019)

Bruno Miguel de Oliveira Nunes (born 16 October 1976) is a Portuguese businessman, writer and politician of the Chega party and a member of the Assembly of the Republic for the Setúbal district constituency.

Nunes has been involved in Portuguese politics for over twenty years and began his career as a member of the People's Monarchist Party. He stood as a candidate for the party during the 2014 European Parliament election. He joined Chega in 2019 and was elected as a municipal councilor for the party in Loures in 2021.

For the 2022 Portuguese legislative election, Nunes was elected to parliament to represent the Setúbal district. He currently sits on the committees for European affairs, local government and the constitution. He is also vice-president of the Chega parliamentary group.

== Electoral history ==
=== Loures City Council election, 2021 ===
Ballot: 26 September 2021
Party	Candidate	Votes	%	Seats	+/−
PS	Ricardo Leão	25,777	31.5	4	±0
CDU	Bernardino Soares	23,756	29.1	4	±0
PSD	Nelson Batista	11,451	14.0	2	–1
CH	Bruno Nunes	6,884	8.4	1	new
BE	Fabian Figueiredo	3,170	3.9	0	±0
IL	Filomena Francisco	2,729	3.3	0	new
PAN	Soraya Ossman	1,834	2.2	0	±0
CDS–PP	Jorge Gomes dos Santos	1,251	1.5	0	±0
PCTP/MRPP	João Resa	1,249	1.5	0	±0
Blank/Invalid ballots		3,685	4.5	–	–
Turnout		81,786	48.32	11	±0
Source: Autárquicas 2021

=== Loures City Council election, 2025 ===
Ballot: 12 October 2025
Party	Candidate	Votes	%	Seats	+/−
PS	Ricardo Leão	40,020	43.8	6	+2
CH	Bruno Nunes	18,868	20.7	2	+1
PSD/CDS	Nelson Batista	13,570	14.9	2	±0
CDU	Gonçalo Caroço	10,014	11.0	1	–3
BE/L/PAN	Luís Sousa	3,095	3.4	0	±0
IL	Luís Martins	2,321	2.5	0	new
Other parties		801	0.9	0	±0
Blank/Invalid ballots		2,610	2.9	–	–
Turnout		91,299	54.10	11	±0
Source: Autárquicas 2025

== Published work ==
- Diário de uma Stripper (Sete Caminhos, 2005)
