= Miguel Ganhão Pereira =

Portuguese journalist (1971–2000)

Miguel Ganhão Pereira (Lisbon, 1971 – 4 December 2000) was a Portuguese journalist. He worked at TVI since 1992 up until his suicide in 2000. He was known for presenting the news and also making his own in-depth reports.

== Life and career ==
Pereira was born in Lisbon in 1971 to Rui Ganhão Pereira, an RTP journalist, and an unknown mother; he married SIC journalist Ana de Freitas and they had a daughter, Maria de Freitas Ganhão Pereira, born in the summer of 2000.

His television career began in 1992, when he was hired for the then-upcoming commercial network TVI. In the channel's early years, he suffered an accident and was temporarily replaced by José Mussuaíli. During the late 90s, he presented the weekend editions of TVI's prime time news bulletin, Directo XXI.

In 1998, he received an award for his report Quem tem medo do povo vasco livre?, and, just before his suicide, was finishing a report on the Camarate affair, twenty years after it happened.

== Suicide ==
At 22:!5 on 4 December 2000, Miguel Ganhão Pereira suicided himself, when he stopped the car at the 25 de Abril Bridge southward, throwing himself to the Tagus river. When the alarm was given by authorities, the body was taken away from the river by the

TVI carried its funeral; his father-in-law João Abel de Freitas criticized the channel's treatment of it, as well as of Pereira's image, accusing it of illegitimate exploitation.
