= Santa Iria de Azoia, São João da Talha e Bobadela =

Civil parish in Loures, Portugal

- Civil parish
- Location in Portugal
- Coordinates: 38°49′23.2″N 9°5′54.1″W
- Country: Portugal
- Region: Lisbon
- Metropolitan area: Lisbon
- District: Lisbon
- Municipality: Loures

Area
  - Total: 17.59 km^{2} (6.79 sq mi)

Population (2021)
  - Total: 44,453
  - Density: 2,500/km^{2} (6,500/sq mi)
- Time zone: UTC+00:00 (WET)
  - Summer (DST): UTC+01:00 (WEST)

Santa Iria de Azoia, São João da Talha e Bobadela is a freguesia (civil parish) in the municipality of Loures, Portugal. It was formed in 2013 by the merger of the three former freguesias: Santa Iria de Azoia, São João da Talha and Bobadela. The population in 2021 was 44,453, in an area of 17.59 km^{2}.

== See also ==
- Santa Iria de Azoia
- São João da Talha
- Bobadela
