= Adelino Amaro da Costa =

Portuguese politician (1943–1980)

Adelino Amaro da Costa GCIH
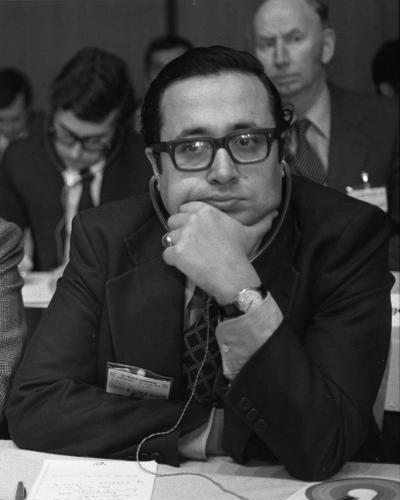
- Adelino Amaro da Costa in October 1978

Minister of National Defence
- In office 3 January 1980 – 4 December 1980
- President: António Ramalho Eanes
- Prime Minister: Francisco de Sá Carneiro
- Preceded by: José Alberto Loureiro dos Santos
- Succeeded by: Luís de Azevedo Coutinho

Personal details
- Born: 18 April 1943 Algés, Portugal
- Died: 4 December 1980 (aged 37) Camarate, Portugal
- Party: CDS – People's Party (CDS-PP)

Adelino Manuel Lopes Amaro da Costa, GCIH (18 April 1943 – 4 December 1980) was a Portuguese politician. He was a founder of the Democratic and Social Centre (CDS), and became the first civilian defence minister since the Carnation Revolution. He died in the 1980 Camarate air crash.

== Background ==
Costa was a son of Civil Engineer from the Instituto Superior Técnico of the Technical University of Lisbon (Universidade Técnica de Lisboa) Manuel Rafael Amaro da Costa (b. Odemira, São Martinho das Amoreiras, 10 January 1910–), of some rural Nobility descent, and wife (m. Lisbon, 1937) Joaquina da Conceição Duarte Lopes Nunes (Odemira, Relíquias, 22 January 1914 – Lisbon, Alvalade, 19 June 1991).

== Career ==
Like his father, he was also a civil engineer by training from the Instituto Superior Técnico of the University of Lisbon.

After the Carnation Revolution, he founded, together with Diogo Freitas do Amaral, the Democratic and Social Centre (CDS), in which he became Deputy to the Assembly of the Republic and Minister.

After the victory of the Democratic Alliance, a coalition between the Social Democrats, the Popular Monarchists and his own party, in the 1980 Portuguese legislative election, he became the first civilian defence minister since the Carnation Revolution on 3 January 1980.

He died in the 1980 Camarate air crash, together with his wife Maria Manuel Simões Vaz da Silva Pires, the prime minister Francisco de Sá Carneiro and Sá Carneiro's partner, Snu Abecassis, while heading to Porto to take part in a rally for the 1980 Portuguese presidential election.

Claims have been made that he was the true target for assassination, for he had documents concerning the 1980 October Surprise theory and was planning on taking them to the United Nations' General Assembly. According to these affirmations, Reagan promised to sell American weapons to Iran, to replace the old Portuguese ones; the Portuguese military were acting as middlemen (two of the Portuguese Presidential candidates, in 1980, were Generals, and one of them was promptly accused as responsible for the assassination by many Sá Carneiro supporters); a boat with the weapons was almost seized at Lisbon's harbor. These affirmations are reinforced with the fact that Amaro da Costa was the one renting the plane, and Sá Carneiro was a last minute passenger (possibly as a decoy).

== Decorations ==
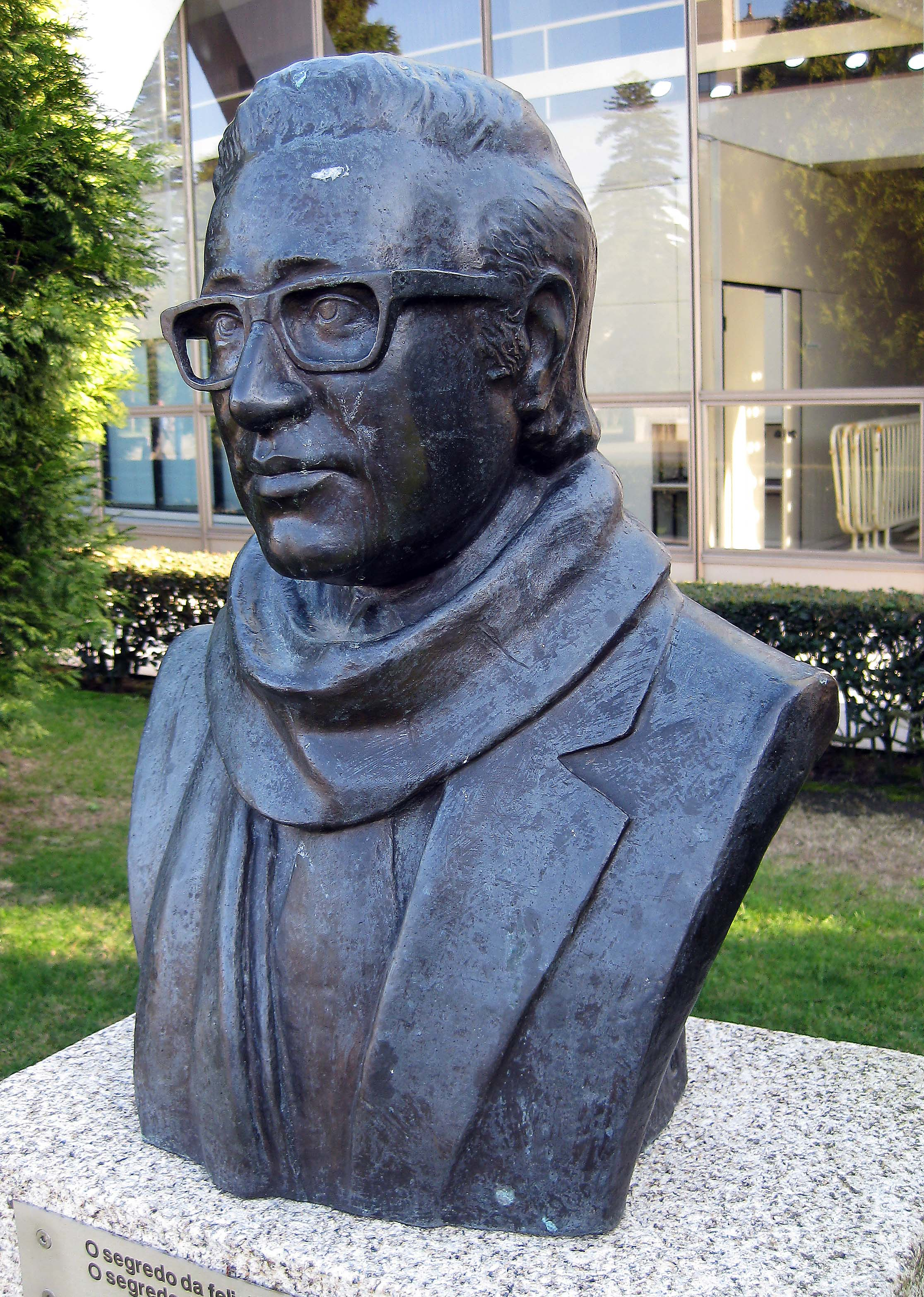
Adelino Amaro da Costa in front of the Cristal Palace, Porto.

He was decorated with the Grand Cross of the Order of Prince Henry (Ordem do Infante Dom Henrique).

== Family ==
He married Maria Manuel Simões Vaz da Silva Pires (26 August 1946 – Loures, Camarate, 4 December 1980), daughter of Gustavo Correia Barata da Silva Pires and wife Maria Manuela da Silva Casaleiro Simões Vaz, without issue.

He was the brother of Manuel Rafael Lopes Amaro da Costa and the brother-in-law of politician Roberto Carneiro.

== Ancestors ==
Ancestors of Adelino Manuel Lopes Amaro da Costa

16. Rafael da Costa
8. José Rafael da Costa
17. Maria de Oliveira
4. António Rafael da Costa
18. Joaquim Francisco
9. Micaela Teresa or Micaela de Jesus
19. Teresa de Jesus
2. Manuel Rafael Amaro da Costa
20. Manuel Guerreiro
10. Amaro Guerreiro
21. Isabel Maria
5. Lucinda Guerreiro de Góis
22. José de Góis
11. Mariana Guerreiro de Góis
23. Maria Guerreiro or Sabina Rodrigues
1. Adelino Manuel Lopes Amaro da Costa
24. José Lopes
12. Julião Henriques Lopes
25. Rosa Maria
6. Manuel Henriques Lopes Nunes
26. José Miguel
13. Joaquina da Conceição
27. Maria Rosa
3. Joaquina da Conceição Duarte Lopes Nunes
28. Francisco Duarte
14. António Duarte
29. Maria Bárbara
7. Conceição Maria Duarte
30. José António
15. Maria Jacinta
31. Jacinta Maria
