= Bobadela =

Bobadela may refer to:

- Bobadela, Boticas, a village in the municipality of Boticas, Portugal
- Bobadela, Loures, a town in the municipality of Loures, Portugal
