= Bernardino Soares =

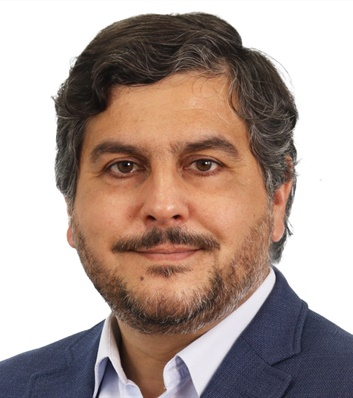
- Bernardino Soares

Mayor of Loures
- In office 22 October 2013 – 14 October 2021
- Preceded by: Carlos Teixeira
- Succeeded by: Ricardo Leão

President of the Portuguese Communist Party's parliamentary group
- In office 13 June 2001 – 3 October 2013
- Preceded by: Octávio Teixeira
- Succeeded by: João Oliveira

Member of the Assembly of the Republic
- In office 27 October 1995 – 3 October 2013
- Constituency: Lisbon

Personal details
- Born: Bernardino José Torrão Soares; 15 September 1971 (age 54)
- Party: Portuguese Communist Party
- Occupation: Politician

Bernardino José Torrão Soares (born 15 September 1971) is a Portuguese politician who has served as Mayor of Loures from 2013 until 2021. A member of the Portuguese Communist Party, he was also a member of the Assembly of the Republic from 1995 until 2013 and was president of the party's parliamentary group from 2001 until 2013.

After losing reelection as Mayor of Loures to Ricardo Leão in the 2021 local election, he attempted to return to Parliament in the 2024 and 2025 legislative elections, first in Santarém and then in Beja, failing to be elected both times.

== Electoral history ==
=== Loures City Council election, 2013 ===
Ballot: 29 September 2013
Party	Candidate	Votes	%	Seats	+/−
CDU	Bernardino Soares	28,572	34.7	5	+2
PS	João Nunes	25,699	31.2	4	–2
PSD/MPT/PPM	Fernando Costa	13,164	16.0	2	±0
BE	Jorge Costa	2,594	3.2	0	±0
CDS–PP	José Lino Ramos	2,522	3.1	0	±0
PCTP/MRPP	Luís Patrício	2,387	2.9	0	±0
Other parties		978	1.2	0	±0
Blank/Invalid ballots		6,337	7.7	–	–
Turnout		82,253	49.46	11	±0
Source: Autárquicas 2013

=== Loures City Council election, 2017 ===
Ballot: 1 October 2017
Party	Candidate	Votes	%	Seats	+/−
CDU	Bernardino Soares	28,701	32.8	4	–1
PS	Sónia Paixão	24,737	28.2	4	±0
PSD/PPM	André Ventura	18,877	21.5	3	+1
BE	Fabian Figueiredo	3,107	3.5	0	±0
CDS–PP	Pedro Pestana Bastos	2,508	2.9	0	±0
PCTP/MRPP	João Resa	2,232	2.5	0	±0
PAN	Ana Sofia da Silva	1,824	2.1	1	new
Other parties		1,452	1.7	0	±0
Blank/Invalid ballots		4,162	4.8	–	–
Turnout		87,600	52.31	11	±0
Source: Autárquicas 2017

=== Loures City Council election, 2021 ===
Ballot: 26 September 2021
Party	Candidate	Votes	%	Seats	+/−
PS	Ricardo Leão	25,777	31.5	4	±0
CDU	Bernardino Soares	23,756	29.1	4	±0
PSD	Nelson Batista	11,451	14.0	2	–1
CH	Bruno Nunes	6,884	8.4	1	new
BE	Fabian Figueiredo	3,170	3.9	0	±0
IL	Filomena Francisco	2,729	3.3	0	new
PAN	Soraya Ossman	1,834	2.2	0	±0
CDS–PP	Jorge Gomes dos Santos	1,251	1.5	0	±0
PCTP/MRPP	João Resa	1,249	1.5	0	±0
Blank/Invalid ballots		3,685	4.5	–	–
Turnout		81,786	48.32	11	±0
Source: Autárquicas 2021
