= Cave of Pego do Diabo =

Cave and archaeological site in Portugal

- Cave of Loca do Gato (Cat's Den)
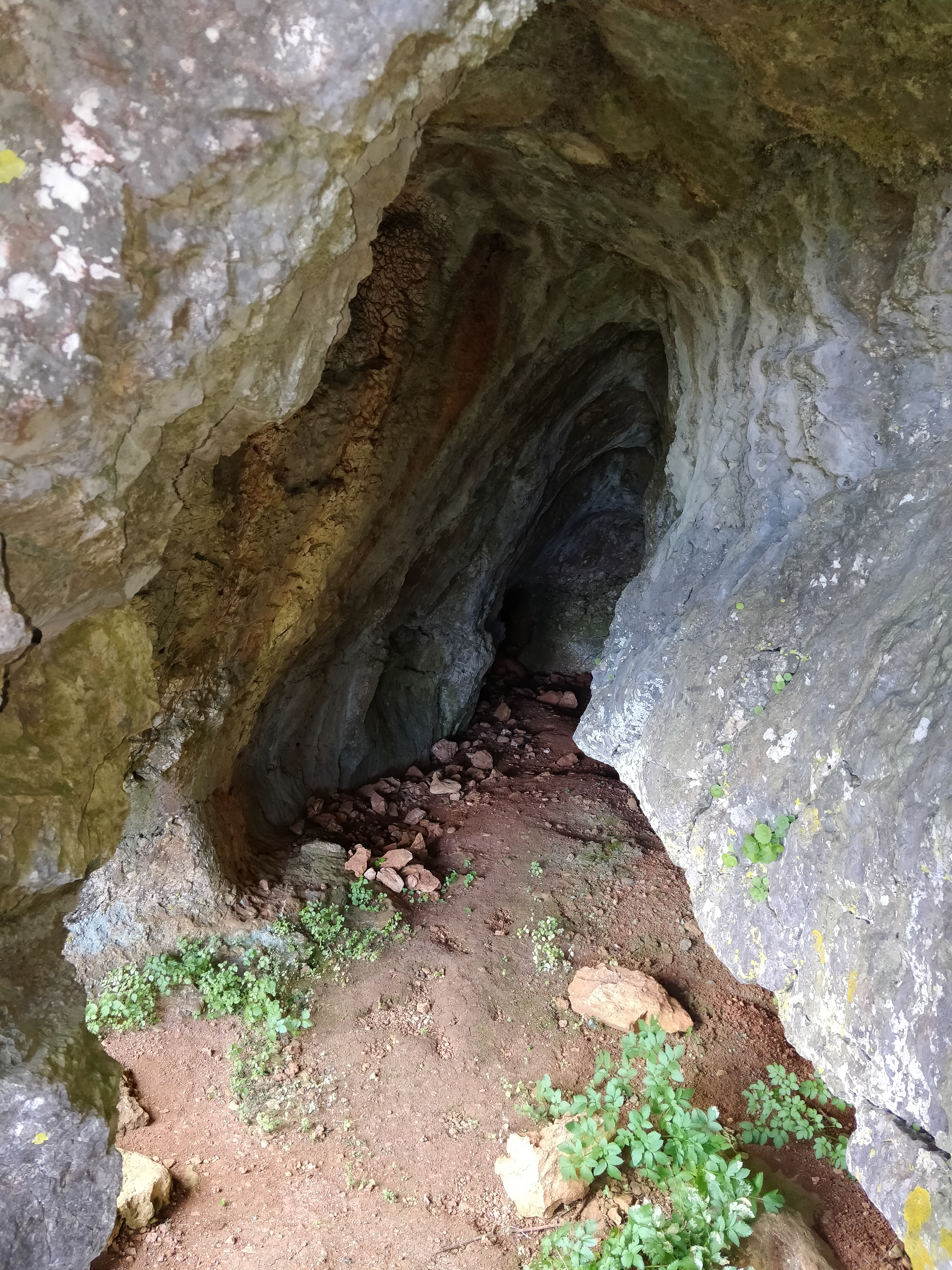
- Interactive map of Cave of Pego do Diabo
- Location: Loures, Lisbon District, Portugal
- Coordinates: 38°51′52″N 9°13′06″W
- Depth: 13 metres
- Elevation: 250 metres
- Discovery: 1965
- Geology: limestone
- Difficulty: easy
- Access: Car and 500 metre walk
- Lighting: no
- Visitors: free access

The Cave of Pego do Diabo (also known as Loca do Gato or Cat's Den) is a small karst cave in a Turonian limestone outcrop located about 250 metres above sea level in the municipality of Loures, about 20 km north of Lisbon in Portugal. The erosion of the outcrop resulted in a set of openings in the rocks wide enough to be exploited by humans. Several archaeological studies have been conducted within the cave, which give insights into the duration of Neanderthal presence on the Iberian Peninsula and to the presence of carnivorous animals during the Paleolithic.

The cave consists of a narrow passage about 13 metres long and one metre wide, with a chamber at the end that is about two metres wide. First officially explored in 1965–66 by the Portuguese Speleological Society, it was surveyed in 1976 by the Grupo para o Estudio do Paleolitico Portugues (Group for the Study of the Portuguese Palaeolithic) and at the end of the 1980s by Prof. João Zilhão. About half of the accessible area of the cave has been studied.

The stratigraphic profile carried out by Zilhão identified six layers to a depth of about 1.4 metres. The upper layer (Layer A), which was only observed at the end of the cave, is indicative of probable use for funerals. Layer 1 contained a mixture of modern and Pleistocene items while Layer 2 contained artifacts of the Upper Paleolithic associated with animal remains. Layer 3 also had animal remains but with distinct colouration, possibly caused by manganese oxides. There were few archaeological materials in Layer 4 and Layer 5 was archaeologically sterile.

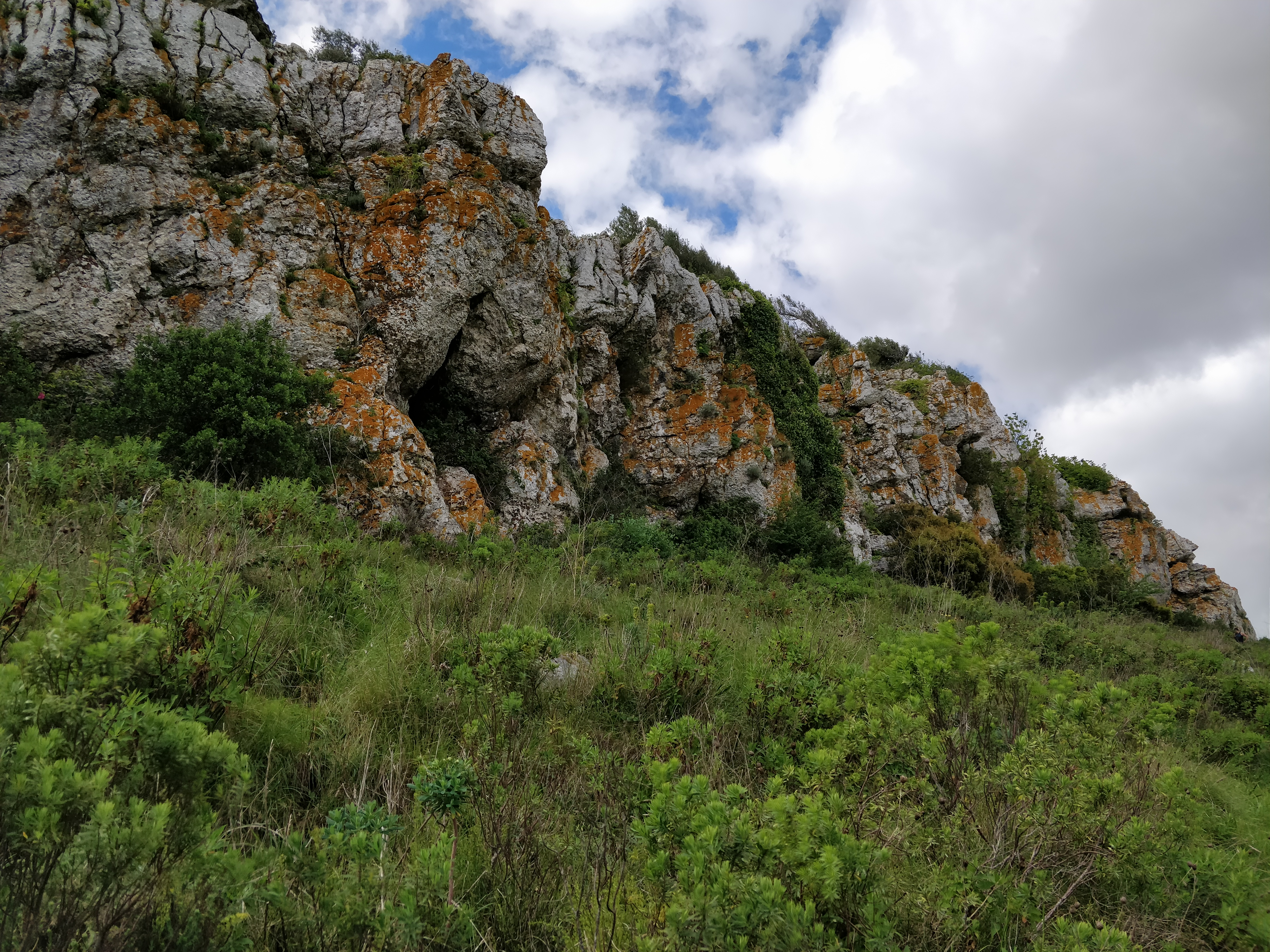
The limestone outcrop in which the cave is situated

Zilhão's research using radiocarbon dating looked for evidence of Neanderthals during the late Aurignacian period (37000-33000 Before the Present). He believed his excavations established a secure terminus ante quem of 34500 years BP for the demise of Neanderthals in the area, although more recent research by Zilhão and others suggests it was earlier than that. This has important implications for the interpretation of the anatomy of the Lapedo child, a complete skeleton found by Zilhão near Leiria in Portugal and believed to be the result of interbreeding between a Neanderthal and a modern human. The dating of the last of the region's Neanderthals to five millennia before the child was borne counters suggestions that Neanderthals could have survived in southwest Iberia until as late as the Last Glacial Maximum (26500 BP). Crossbreeding between immediate ancestors has to be ruled out and the Neanderthal features of the child must represent admixture at the time of contact. Zilhao also considered that his findings had implications for the idea that Neanderthals remained in the Gibraltar area until ca.32-28000 BP. He believed that, as hunter-gatherers living at low population densities, residual Neanderthals could not have survived for several millennia as a separate biological entity.

Work by Maria João Valente analysed the fauna of Layers 1 and 2 associated with the Upper Paleolithic. She noted that the cave contained bones of humans, together with those of wolves, bears, and hyenas, the Iberian lynx and other small carnivores and birds of prey, and their prey such as rabbits. She hypothesised that there would have been competition between humans and animals for use of the cave and noted that the consecutive use of caves by human communities and carnivores had been identified elsewhere. However, an alternative interpretation was that human groups could have carried animal bones into the caves.
