= Ricardo Leão =

Portuguese politician

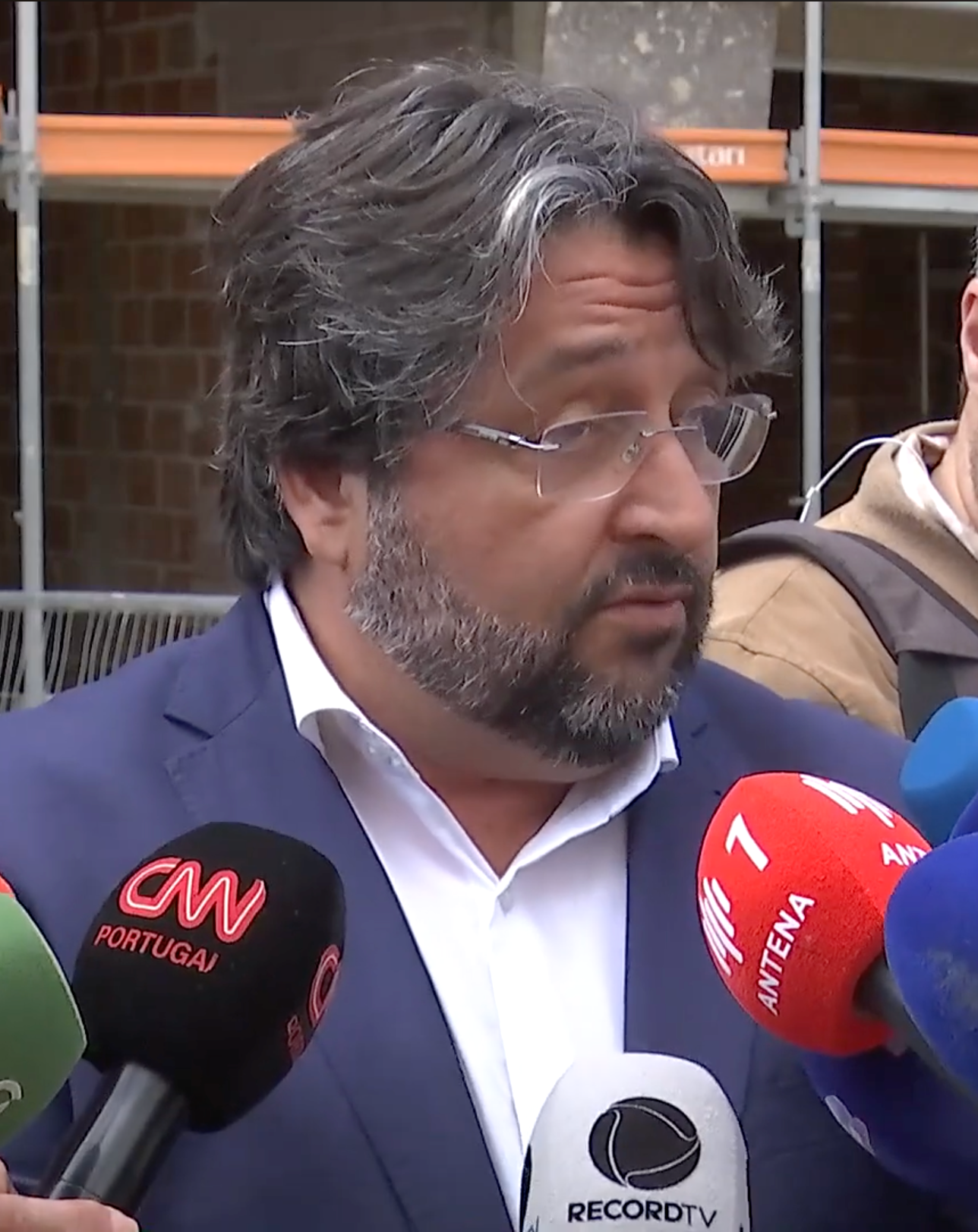
- Ricardo Leão in 2023

Mayor of Loures
- Incumbent
- Assumed office 14 October 2021
- Preceded by: Bernardino Soares

Member of the Assembly of the Republic
- In office 25 October 2019 – 13 October 2021
- Constituency: Lisbon
- In office 27 November 2015 – 14 October 2018
- Constituency: Lisbon

Personal details
- Born: Ricardo Jorge Colaço Leão; 11 August 1975 (age 51)
- Party: Socialist Party
- Occupation: Politician

Ricardo Jorge Colaço Leão (born 11 August 1975) is a Portuguese politician who is currently serving as the Mayor of Loures since 2021. A member of the Socialist Party, he also served as a member of the Assembly of the Republic from 2015 until 2018 and also from 2019 until 2021.

== Political career ==
Ricardo Leão was first elected in the 2001 local election as a city councillor in Loures, returning in 2013 to the same office. He was elected as President of the Municipal Assembly of Loures in the 2017 election.

He became an MP after the 2015 legislative election, replacing Marcos Perestrello who took office as Secretary of State of National Defense and left parliament in 2018 after Perestrello left office in a cabinet reshuffle. He returned to Parliament following the 2019 legislative election, where he stayed until the 2021 local election, when he was selected as the PS candidate for Mayor of Loures.

The PS in Loures won the 2021 election with 31.5% of the votes, while the CDU got 29.1% of the votes and the PSD received 14.0% of the votes. As such, Leão defeated the Communist incumbent Mayor Bernardino Soares, who was in office since 2013, and became the Mayor of Loures, making a deal with the PSD in order to form a majority. In September 2024, he was elected as the leader of the PS Federation of the Urban Area of Lisbon.

After the October 2024 riots in the Lisbon metropolitan area following the death of Odair Moniz, Leão defended the eviction of the people who had participated in the riots. Former Prime Minister and at the time the President of the European Council-elect António Costa wrote an article condemning Leão's comments, which caused his resignation as head of the Federation.

In July 2025, Leão ordered the demolition of illegal constructions in Bairro do Talude. This move also raised criticisms, including from within the PS.

Despite the criticisms, Leão ran for reelection and won the 2025 election with an absolute majority, winning 43.8% of the votes, while Chega got 20.7%, the PSD/CDS coalition got 14.9% and the CDU fell to 11.0%. After the election, he criticized António Costa, stating that he should continue entertaining himself in Europe and that he isn't missed in Portugal.

== Electoral history ==
=== Loures City Council election, 2021 ===
Ballot: 26 September 2021
Party	Candidate	Votes	%	Seats	+/−
PS	Ricardo Leão	25,777	31.5	4	±0
CDU	Bernardino Soares	23,756	29.1	4	±0
PSD	Nelson Batista	11,451	14.0	2	–1
CH	Bruno Nunes	6,884	8.4	1	new
BE	Fabian Figueiredo	3,170	3.9	0	±0
IL	Filomena Francisco	2,729	3.3	0	new
PAN	Soraya Ossman	1,834	2.2	0	±0
CDS–PP	Jorge Gomes dos Santos	1,251	1.5	0	±0
PCTP/MRPP	João Resa	1,249	1.5	0	±0
Blank/Invalid ballots		3,685	4.5	–	–
Turnout		81,786	48.32	11	±0
Source: Autárquicas 2021

=== Loures City Council election, 2025 ===
Ballot: 12 October 2025
Party	Candidate	Votes	%	Seats	+/−
PS	Ricardo Leão	40,020	43.8	6	+2
CH	Bruno Nunes	18,868	20.7	2	+1
PSD/CDS	Nelson Batista	13,570	14.9	2	±0
CDU	Gonçalo Caroço	10,014	11.0	1	–3
BE/L/PAN	Luís Sousa	3,095	3.4	0	±0
IL	Luís Martins	2,321	2.5	0	new
Other parties		801	0.9	0	±0
Blank/Invalid ballots		2,610	2.9	–	–
Turnout		91,299	54.10	11	±0
Source: Autárquicas 2025
