= Camarate =

- Civil parish
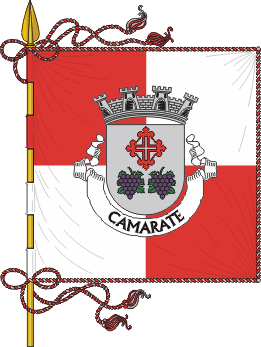
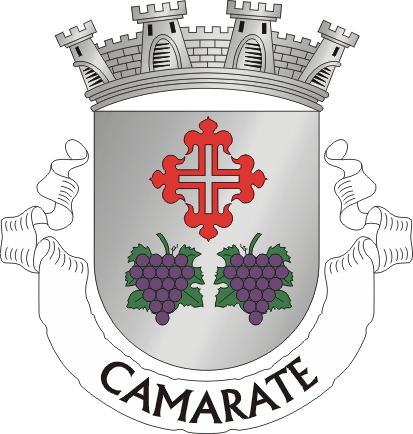
- Flag Coat of arms

- Location in Portugal
- Coordinates: 38°47′52.90″N 9°8′2.17″W
- Country: Portugal
- Region: Lisbon
- Metropolitan area: Lisbon
- District: Lisbon
- Municipality: Loures

Area
  - Total: 5.17 km^{2} (2.00 sq mi)
- Elevation: 123 m (404 ft)

Population (2001)
  - Total: 18,822
  - Density: 3,640/km^{2} (9,430/sq mi)
- Time zone: UTC+00:00 (WET)
  - Summer (DST): UTC+01:00 (WEST)
- Postal code: 2680-103
- Area code: 219
- Patron: Santiago Maior
- Website: www.jfcamarate.pt

Camarate (Portuguese pronunciation: [kɐmɐˈɾatɨ]) is a former civil parish in the municipality of Loures, Lisbon District, Portugal. In 2013, the parish merged into the new parish Camarate, Unhos e Apelação. With a population of 23,000 inhabitants in 2001, the parish of Camarate extends into an area of 5.52 km^{2}.

== History ==
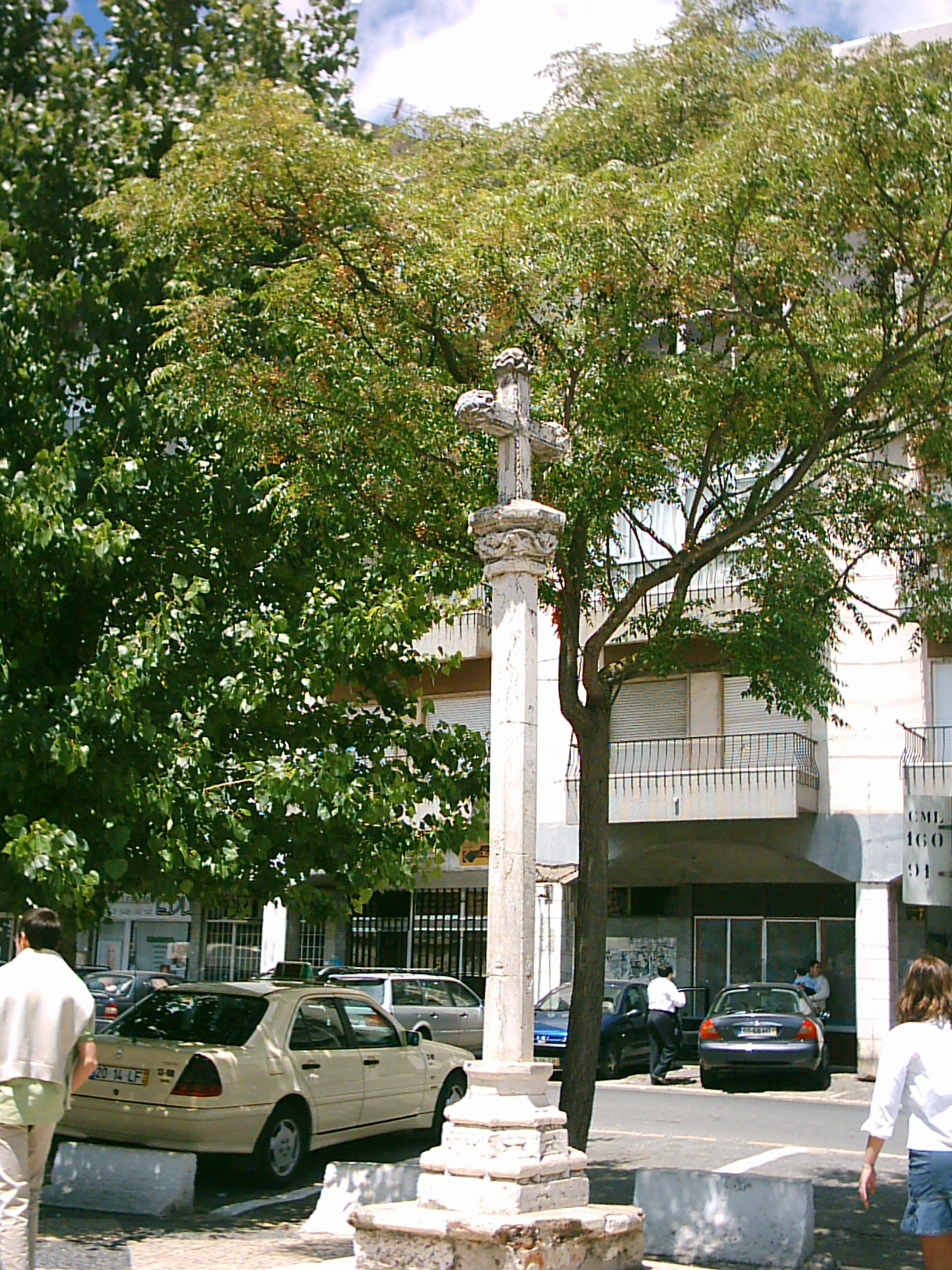
The pillory marking the municipal history of Camarate, in the Largo da Igreja

The probable origin of the local place name came from the historical cultivation of vineyards with a caste of grape called Camarate.

A Matriz Church was founded by the Bishop of Lisbon, Agapito Colona, in the 14th century, and later amplified and expanded. During the Portuguese Interregnum, the estate of Camarate, then property of the Jew David Negro, administrator of the Royal Customhouses of King Ferdinand I of León and Castile, was confiscated and delivered into the hands of Nuno Álvares Pereira, who lived there with his mother until joining the Carmelite Order. While there, the knight founded and consecrated a chapel to Nossa Senhora do Socorro, which he later offered, along with the estate, to the Carmelites, who founded a convent on the site. Much later, under Nuno Álvares Pereira stewardship, Camarate would be integrated (along with other neighbouring lands) into the patrimony of the House of Braganza.

The parish of Camarate separated from the administration of Sacavém across a foral issued by King Manuel I of Portugal, dated 1 May 1511.

After the 17th century, the region became a place of leisure sought after by the Lisboeta nobility. The region was famous for its agricultural, characterized by estates that supported the fiscal production of the parish until the 20th century.

It was part of Lisbon (until 1852), then Santa Maria dos Olivais (between 1852 and 1886). Later, it was re-annexed to Lisbon between 1886 and 1895, before being integrated into the municipality of Loures. On 4 June 1996, the community was elevated to the status of vila (English: town) by decree of the Assembly of the Republic.

After the 20th century, and owing to industrial development in the neighbouring parishes, the parish experienced a growth in population, accompanied by a comparable growth in illegal construction.

Camarate became infamous for the aircraft accident that befell Portuguese Social Democratic Prime Minister Francisco Sá Carneiro, his wife, and the Christian Democratic Defense Minister Adelino Amaro da Costa, on the evening of 4 December 1980. A few hours before the presidential elections, the aircraft was en route to Porto, when it crashed in the parish.

== Geography ==
Situated in north of Lisbon, Camarate is a civil parish located in the eastern part of the municipality of Loure. It is fronted in the northwest by the Lourense parishes of Frielas and Unhos, southeast by Prior Velho and east by Sacavém; in the extreme southeast it borders Santa Maria dos Olivais, in the south Charneca (both parishes of Lisbon); and, finally southwest, with the Olival Basto in the municipality of Odivelas. Part of this configuration means that a portion of the International Airport of Lisbon lies within the borders of the parish.

The civil parish includes several bairros (neighborhoods), including the bairro of Angola, Boavista, Bogalheira, CAR, Esperança, Fetais de Baixo, Fetais de Cima, Fontaínhas, Grilo, Loureiras, Mira-Loures, Santiago, Santo António, São Benedito, São Francisco, dSão João, São José, São Lourenço, Sousas, Torre, Fonte da Pipa, Mucharros, Quinta de Marvila, Quinta do Paraíso, Quinta de Santa Rosa, Quinta do Galeão, in addition to the centre of the vila (English: town).

== Economy ==
It was well known for its local wine, produced in the fertile farms that characterized the parish until the mid-twentieth century. Since then, industrialization has transformed it into an urbanized town.

== Architecture ==
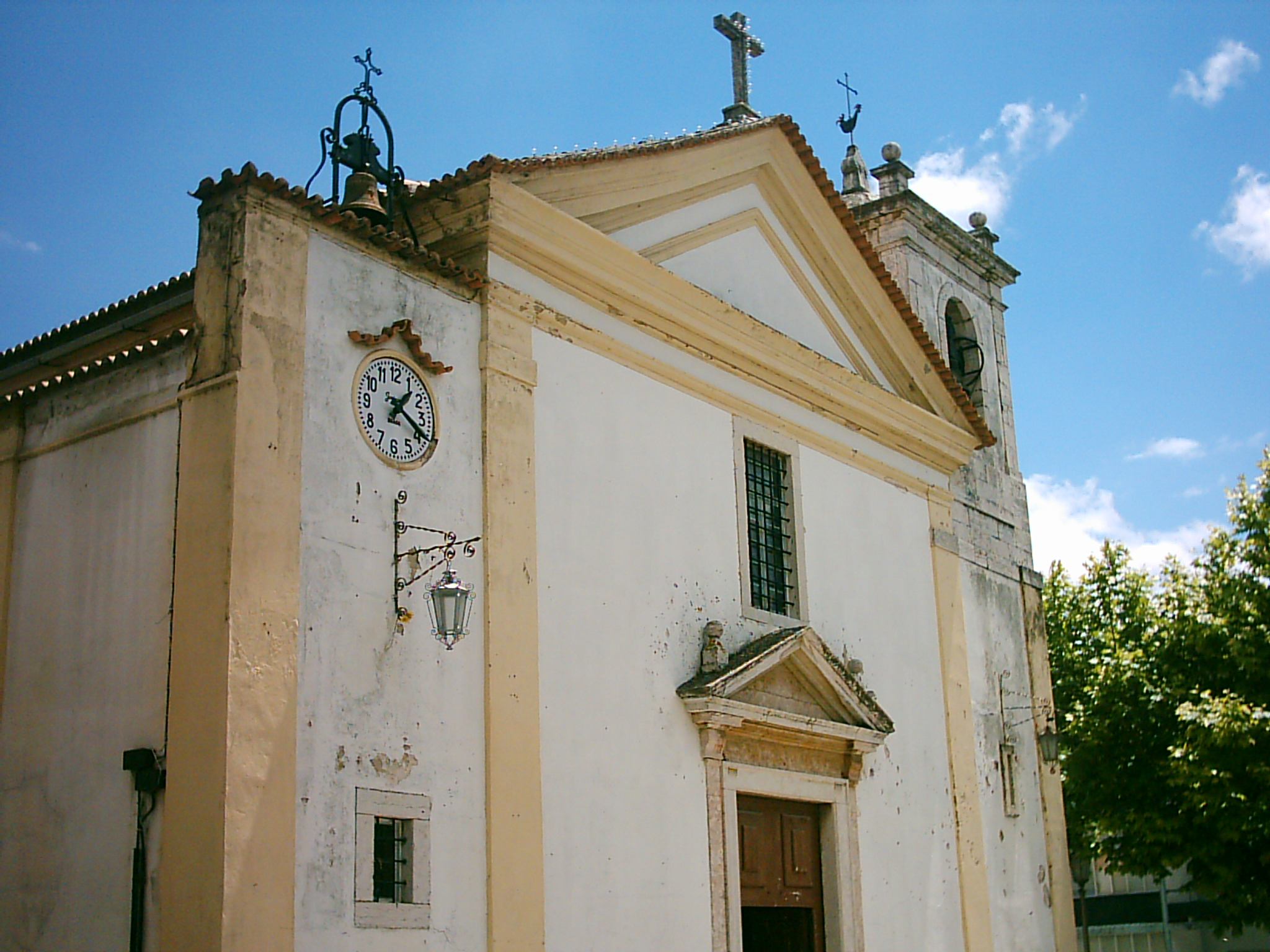
The front façade of the Matriz Church of Santiago Maior de Camarate

=== Civic ===
- Estate of Encarnação (Portuguese: Quinta da Encarnação)
- Estate of Ribeirinha (Portuguese: Quinta da Ribeirinha)
- Estate of Portas de Ferro (Portuguese: Quinta das Portas de Ferro)
- Estate of Santa Teresa (Portuguese: Quinta de Santa Teresa)
- Estate of Redondo (Portuguese: Quinta do Redondo)
- Estate of Ulmeiro (Portuguese: Quinta do Ulmeiro)

=== Religious ===
- Chapel of Nossa Senhora da Vitória (Portuguese: Capela de Nossa Senhora da Vítoria)
- Church of Santiago Maior (Portuguese: Igreja Matriz de Santiago Maior de Camarate), alternately the Church of Saint James of Camarate, located in the intersection between the Praça 1.º de Maio with the Ruas Avelino Salgado de Oliveira and Rua de Guilherme Gomes Fernandes, the parochial church was constructed in 1370 by the Bishop of Lisbon. Over time the building deteriorated to the point that, in 1511, a new church was reconstructed on the same site, at the same time that Camarate became an independent ecclesiastical parish. A similar reconstruction/remodelling occurred at the beginning of the 17th century.

== Notable citizens ==
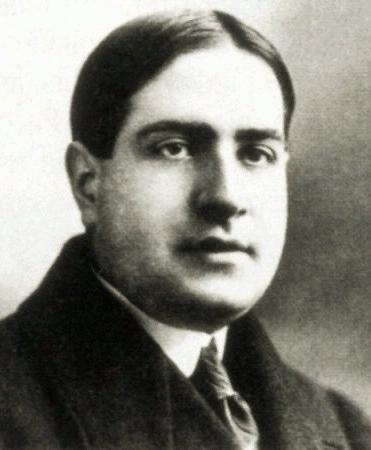
The poet Mario de Sá Carneiro who committed suicide by taking strychnine during a phase of depression brought on by financial circumstances

- Mário de Sá Carneiro (19 May 1890 — Paris; 26 April 1916), was a Portuguese poet and writer, member of the "Geração D'Orpheu", who, along with Fernando Pessoa and Almada Negreiros, contributed poetry and artistic prose influenced by cosmopolitanism and the European Avant-Garde
