= José Manuel Malhão Pereira =

Capt. José Manuel Malhão Pereira ComSE (born on 12 November 1940) is a retired officer (Captain of Sea and War) of the Portuguese Navy, and a worldwide known scholar of nautical sciences.

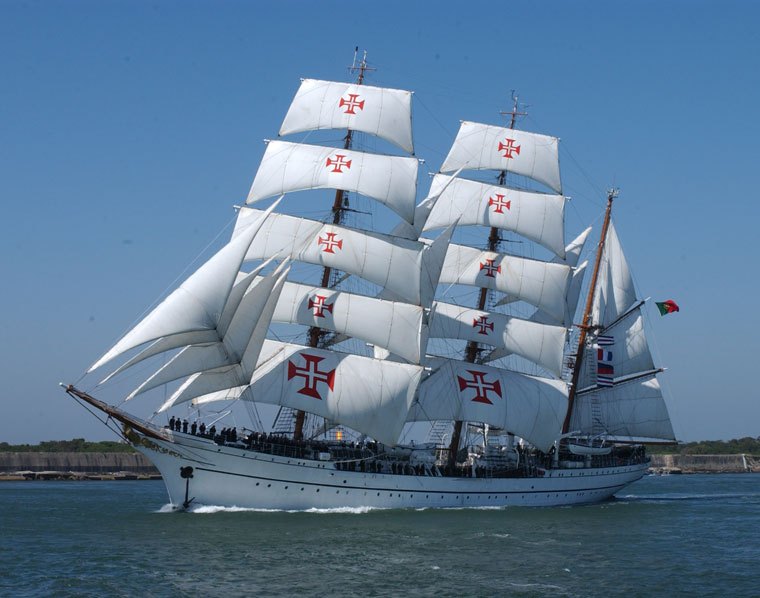
The Portuguese Navy school ship Sagres in 2006

Malhão Pereira was born in Loures, Lisbon. He was for a long time a professor at the Navy School, and from 1989 to 1993, Commander of the NRP Sagres, school ship of the Portuguese Navy. On 10 June 2013, he was awarded the Military Order of Saint James of the Sword.

He is a member of the Centro Interuniversitário de História das Ciências e da Tecnologia (CIUHCT), at the Faculty of Sciences, University of Lisbon, and also an advisor to the ERC RUTTER Project.

In addition to the Academia de Marinha, the Lisbon Geographic Society and other learned societies in Portugal, Capt. Malhão Pereira is a life member of the Kannur University Institute for Research in Social Sciences and Humanities (IRISH).

== Publications ==
- “Experiências Com Instrumentos da Época dos Descobrimentos”, in Mare Liberum, no. 7, Lisbon, Comissão Nacional para as Comemorações dos Descobrimentos Portugueses, 1994.
- “A Viagem de Vasco da Gama e a Navegação à Vela”, in IV Simpósio de História Marítima, Lisbon, Academia de Marinha, 1996.
- “The Predecessors of Vasco da Gama”, San Diego, San Diego Cabrilho Festival, 1997.
- “Vasco da Gama na Costa Indiana em 1498”, Lisbon, Academia de Marinha, 1997.
- "The Harbour of Pandarane. An Important Harbour on the Coast of Malabar", in IX Seminar on Indo- Portuguese History, New Delhi, Indian National Science Academy, 1998.
- “Estudo náutico da Viagem de Vasco da Gama”, in A viagem de Vasco da Gama à Índia, Lisbon, Academia de Marinha, 1999.
- “A Derrota de Álvares Cabral no Atlântico em 1500 e as Viagens e Roteiros da Carreira da Índia”, in VI Simpósio de História Marítima, Lisbon, Academia de Marinha, 2000.
- "Experiências com Instrumentos e Métodos Antigos de Navegação", Lisbon, Academia de Marinha, 2000.
- “Norte dos Pilotos. Guia dos Curiozos, de Manuel dos Santos Raposo. Um Livro de Marinharia do Século XVIII”. Master thesis in History of the Discoveries and the Portuguese Expansion, Lisbon, Universidade Nova de Lisboa, 2001.
- “Da Viagem de Fernão de Magalhães ao Estabelecimento da Rota da Especiaria de Espanha. Factores Náuticos e Meteorológicos”, in VII Simpósio de História Marítima, Academia de Marinha, 2001.
- “The Mighty Red Sea”, International Seminar on Maritime Activities in India with Reference to the Portuguese 1500–1800, Universidade de Goa, Academia da Marinha, Lisbon, Instituto Hidrográfico, 2001.
- "Academia da Marinha East and West Encounter at Sea", Seminar "On Maritime Malabar and the Europeans (1500-1962)", Tellichery (Indian Union), 16 January 2002.
- “The Stellar Compass and the Kamal. An Interpretation of its Practical Use”, in Proceedings of the International Seminar on Marine Archeology, Delhi, 2003, also published by Academia de Marinha (Lisbon, 2003).
- "A Náutica, a Hidrografia e a Meteorologia", in Ars Nautica de Fernando Oliveira, Lisbon, Academia de Marinha, 2003.
- “Algumas Considerações de Ordem Crítica ao Livro 1421, The Year China Discovered the World, de Gavin Menzies”, Lisbon, Academia de Marinha, 2004.
- "As Técnicas Náuticas Pregâmicas no Índico", Lisbon, Academia de Marinha, 2004.
- "O Cabo da Boa Esperança e o espólio náutico submerso", Lisbon, Academia da Marinha, MR - Artes Gráficas, Lda, 2005.
- “Ideas for Cooperative Research on Early Cartography and Pilot-books of Eastern Asia and Western Pacific”, Nanjing, International Forum on the 600th Anniversary of Cheng Ho, 2005.
- "A evolução da técnica náutica portuguesa até ao uso do método das distâncias lunares", XII Reunión Internacional de História de la Náutica y de la Hidrografía, Setembro de 2004, in La ciência y el mar, María Isabel Vicente Maroto; Mariano Esteban Piñeiro eds., Valladolid, Universidad de Valladolid, 2006, 125–147.
- "A Ciência Náutica e o Contacto Entre os Povos", Lisbon, Centro Científico e Cultural de Macau, 2006.
- “Aspectos Náuticos das Viagens de Cheng Ho”, VII Chinese Cultural Week at the Instituto Superior de Ciências Sociais e Políticas - Universidade Técnica de Lisboa, 19–24 January 2004, in Estudos sobre a China VII, Lisbon, 2005, 109–142.
- With Jin Guo Ping, “Navegações chinesas no século XV. Realidade e ficção.” Lisbon, Academia da Marinha, ISBN 972-781-095-0, 2006.
- "Algumas das consequências geográficas e náuticas das navegações chinesas do século XV", Lisbon, Academia da Marinha, 2006.
- "Nine Portuguese ships wrecked and nine sites identified. A nautical study of their voyages from India to the South-African Coast", Second Portuguese Maritime Archaeology and History Conference, of the Centre for Portuguese Nautical Studies, Mossel Bay, 2006.
- "Um manuscrito de cerca de 1767, do P. José Monteiro da Rocha, S.J. com uma solução matemática para a obtenção da longitude pelas distâncias lunares", Cuadernos de Estúdios Borjanos, vol. 50–51, 2007–2008, 339–394.
- “A Ilha de Moçambique na roteirística e na cartografía”, in Os Portugueses e a Ásia Marítima, I Simpósio de História do Oriente, Academia de Marinha, Lisbon, 2018.
