= Camarate, Unhos e Apelação =

- Civil parish
- Location in Portugal
- Coordinates: 38.802°N 9.128°W
- Country: Portugal
- Region: Lisbon
- Metropolitan area: Lisbon
- District: Lisbon
- Municipality: Loures

Area
  - Total: 11.57 km^{2} (4.47 sq mi)

Population (2011)
  - Total: 34,943
  - Density: 3,000/km^{2} (7,800/sq mi)
- Time zone: UTC+00:00 (WET)
  - Summer (DST): UTC+01:00 (WEST)

Camarate, Unhos e Apelação is a civil parish in the municipality of Loures, Portugal. It was formed in 2013 by the merger of the former parishes Camarate, Unhos and Apelação. The population in 2011 was 34,943, in an area of 11.57 km².
