= Santa Iria de Azoia =

Town in Loures, Portugal

- Civil parish
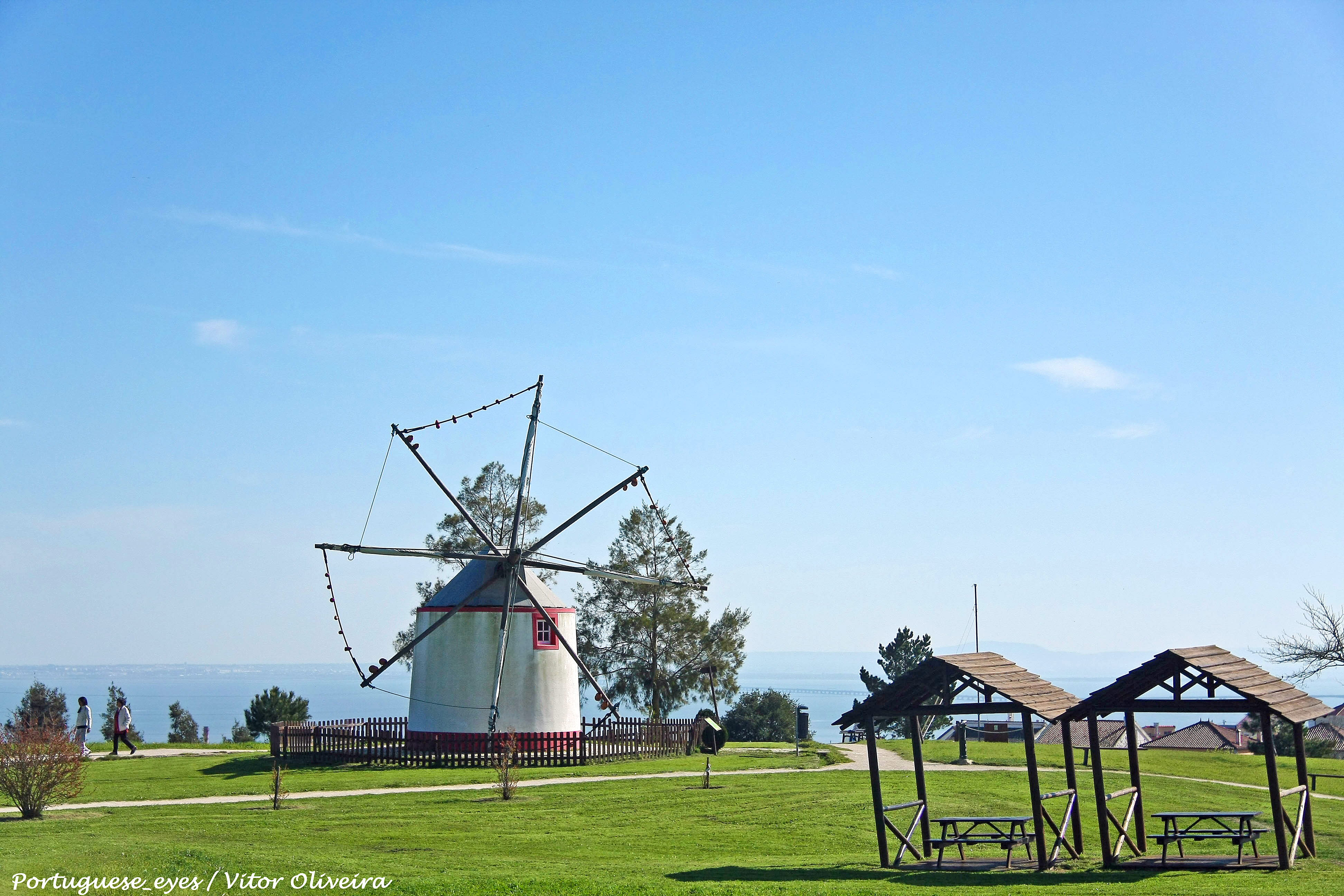

- Location in Portugal
- Coordinates: 38°50′34.0″N 9°5′29.0″W
- Country: Portugal
- Region: Lisbon
- District: Lisbon
- Municipality: Loures

Population (2011)
  - Total: 18,240
- Time zone: UTC+00:00 (WET)
  - Summer (DST): UTC+01:00 (WEST)

Santa Iria de Azoia is a town and former freguesia (civil parish) in the municipality of Loures, Portugal. Since 2013, it is part of the freguesia Santa Iria de Azoia, São João da Talha e Bobadela. Its population in 2011 was 18,240.
