= Bobadela, Loures =

Town in Loures, Portugal

Bobadela
- Civil parish
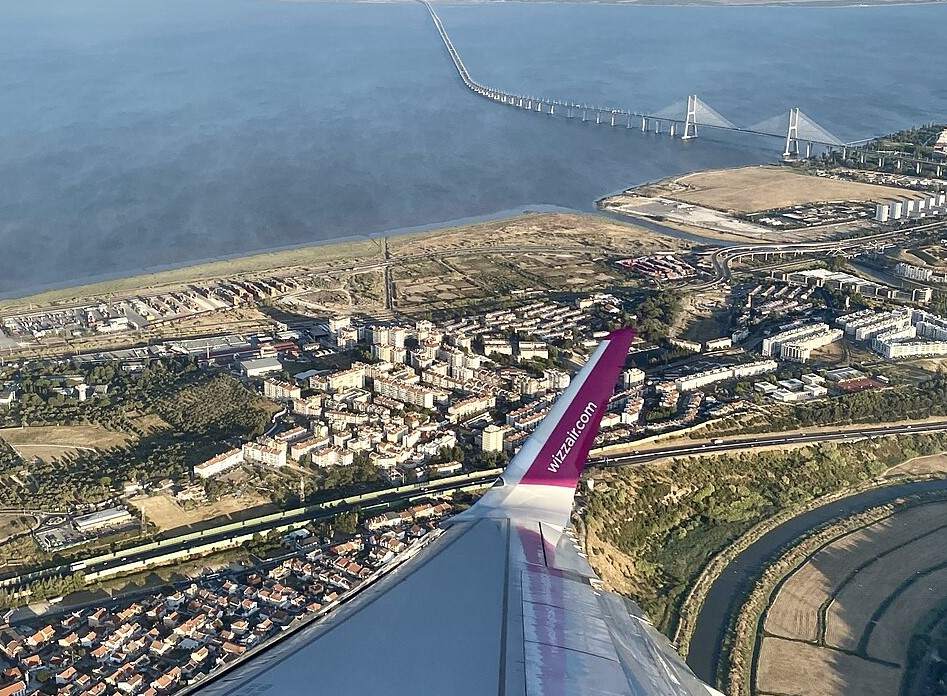
- Aerial view of Bobadela

- Location in Portugal
- Coordinates: 38°48′23.2″N 9°5′59.2″W
- Country: Portugal
- Region: Lisbon
- District: Lisbon
- Municipality: Loures

Population (2011)
  - Total: 8,839
- Time zone: UTC+00:00 (WET)
  - Summer (DST): UTC+01:00 (WEST)

Bobadela is a town and former freguesia (civil parish) in the municipality of Loures, Portugal. Since 2013, it is part of the freguesia Santa Iria de Azoia, São João da Talha e Bobadela. Its population in 2011 was 8,839.
