= 1980 Camarate plane crash =

Crash in Portugal that killed the prime minister

Camarate plane crash
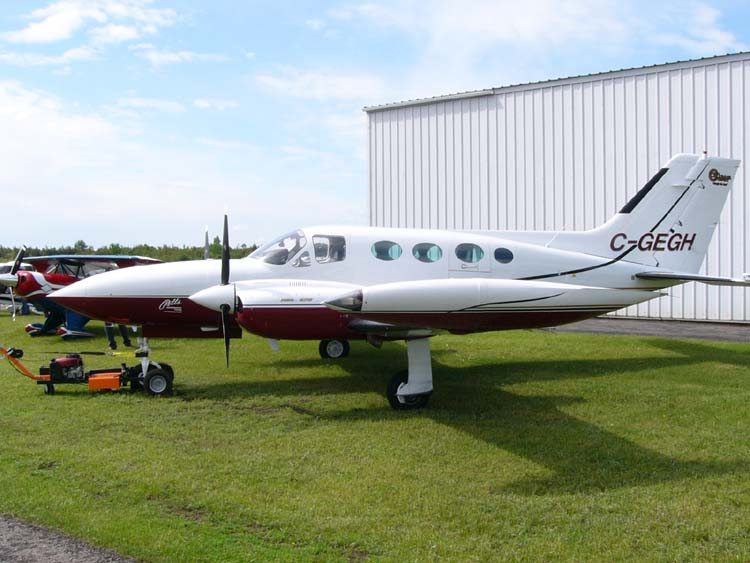
- Cessna 421, similar to the aircraft involved

Incident
- Date: 4 December 1980
- Summary: Fuel exhaustion / Bombing (official conclusion, disputed)
- Site: Camarate, Lisbon, Portugal

Aircraft
- Aircraft type: Cessna 421
- Registration: YV-314-P
- Flight origin: Lisbon Portela Airport, Lisbon
- Destination: Pedras Rubras Airport, Porto
- Passengers: 5
- Crew: 2
- Fatalities: 7
- Survivors: 0

The 1980 Camarate air crash occurred on 4 December 1980 when a small private aircraft carrying Portuguese Prime Minister Francisco de Sá Carneiro and Defense Minister Adelino Amaro da Costa crashed in Camarate, Lisbon, Portugal. Initial investigations concluded the incident was due to crew fatigue and incompetence, but later parliamentary investigations found evidence of a bomb beneath the cockpit. After the 15-year statute of limitations took effect, several people came forward claiming involvement. No convincing evidence of sabotage has ever surfaced, but suspicion of foul play has never been fully put to rest.

== Background ==
Following the 1974 Carnation Revolution, Francisco de Sá Carneiro had been elected Prime Minister on 3 January 1980, and Adelino Amaro da Costa became the first civilian Defense Minister. They were on their way to an election rally three days before the Portuguese presidential election, 1980. Amaro da Costa had chartered a Cessna for the trip; Sá Carneiro had intended to travel by other means, and joined the trip at the last minute with his partner, Snu Abecassis.

== Incident ==
The Cessna 421A Golden Eagle, a private aircraft chartered by da Costa, crashed shortly after take-off from Lisbon Portela Airport. Witnesses saw the aircraft trailing debris before hitting high-voltage power lines and crashing in a fireball.

== Investigations ==
The incident was subject to many investigations. The initial investigation by the aviation authority concluded the crash was an accident caused by a lack of fuel in one of the tanks. The final police report in 1981 ruled out criminal actions. In 1983, the Attorney General suspended the investigation. Parliamentary investigations in 1990 and 1991 did not lead to a re-opening of the case, but after the fifth parliamentary inquiry in 1995, the case was re-opened.

For the 1995 re-opening of the judicial investigation, the victims' bodies were exhumed, and a forensic report concluded that there had probably not been an explosion on the aircraft, although the possibility was not ruled out. After interviewing José Esteves, who later said he had manufactured a device for the attack, the criminal proceedings were suspended. A private prosecution launched by victims' relatives was declared time-barred in 1996, with the exception of one alleged conspirator, L.R., who was detained in Brazil on other matters, leading the 15-year time limit to be suspended in his case. In 1998, a district court judge in the L.R. private prosecution reaffirmed that the incident had been an accident, a decision upheld by the Court of Appeal in 2000 with an 800-page judgement. An attempt to re-open the case against L.R. in 2001 on grounds of new evidence was judged time-barred. Legal challenges were dismissed by the Supreme Court in 2006, and an appeal to the European Court of Human Rights was made in 2007 alleging breach of Article 6 of the European Convention on Human Rights on the grounds that the case had become time-barred due to the negligence of the Portuguese authorities. The Court concluded in 2011 "that the substance of their right of access to a court had not been impaired by any negligence or failure to act on the part of the competent authorities".

In 2001, a lawyer for relatives of the victims, Ricardo Sá Fernandes, published a book arguing that the target of the assassination was newly appointed Defence Minister da Costa due to his knowledge of arms deals with Iran obtained from his new position. 2001 also saw the release of Camarate: acidente ou atentado?, a film on the subject by Luis Filipe Rocha.

In 2004, the 8th parliamentary inquiry into the affair, headed by Christian Democratic Member of Parliament Nuno Melo concluded in its unanimous final report that the incident had been caused by an explosive device on the aircraft. Melo told the Xth enquiry in 2013 to investigate the role of arms sales to Iran and the Army's "Fundo de Defesa do Ultramar" slush fund, saying that da Costa had asked the Army about arms sales to Iran on 2 December 1980, and that on 5 December, the day after his death, the Army had issued an order illegally declaring arms sales to be under its jurisdiction, not the Defence Minister's.

In 2006, former security agent José Esteves claimed to have manufactured an explosive device intended for an attack on da Costa's plane. He said the intention had been for the device to cause a fire prior to take-off, permitting the occupants to evacuate safely, but giving a "warning" to presidential candidate António Soares Carneiro. Esteves said his device had been a firebomb using potassium chlorate, sugar and sulfuric acid. In 2013, Esteves told the parliamentary X Commission that in planning the operation he had been told that the newly elected Democratic Alliance government was causing problems with weapons sales. He also said he had been paid $200,000 by CIA agent Frank Sturgis to create the device, and that his firebomb device alone did not cause the crash, maintaining that additional explosives must have been involved.

In 2010, Diogo de Freitas do Amaral, who briefly became interim Prime Minister after the crash, published a book on the subject.

In 2012, José Ribeiro e Castro argued for a tenth parliamentary enquiry in part due to the claim of one of the alleged principal conspirators, Fernando Farinha Simões, who in 2011 published an 18-page confession on the internet describing his alleged involvement in the operation. Farinha Simões said he had been tasked by the US Central Intelligence Agency with the operation, at a cost of $750,000, paid for with CIA credit cards. He said that of this $200,000 had been passed on to José Esteves for his bomb-making services.

== Books ==
- Amaral, Diogo Freitas do (2010). Camarate: um caso ainda em aberto: apelo de um cidadão. Lisboa: Bertrand. ISBN 978-9722522434.
- Sá Fernandes, Ricardo (2001). O crime de Camarate. Lisboa: Bertrand.

== See also ==
- Portugal and the Iran–Iraq War
