= Loures =

- Municipality
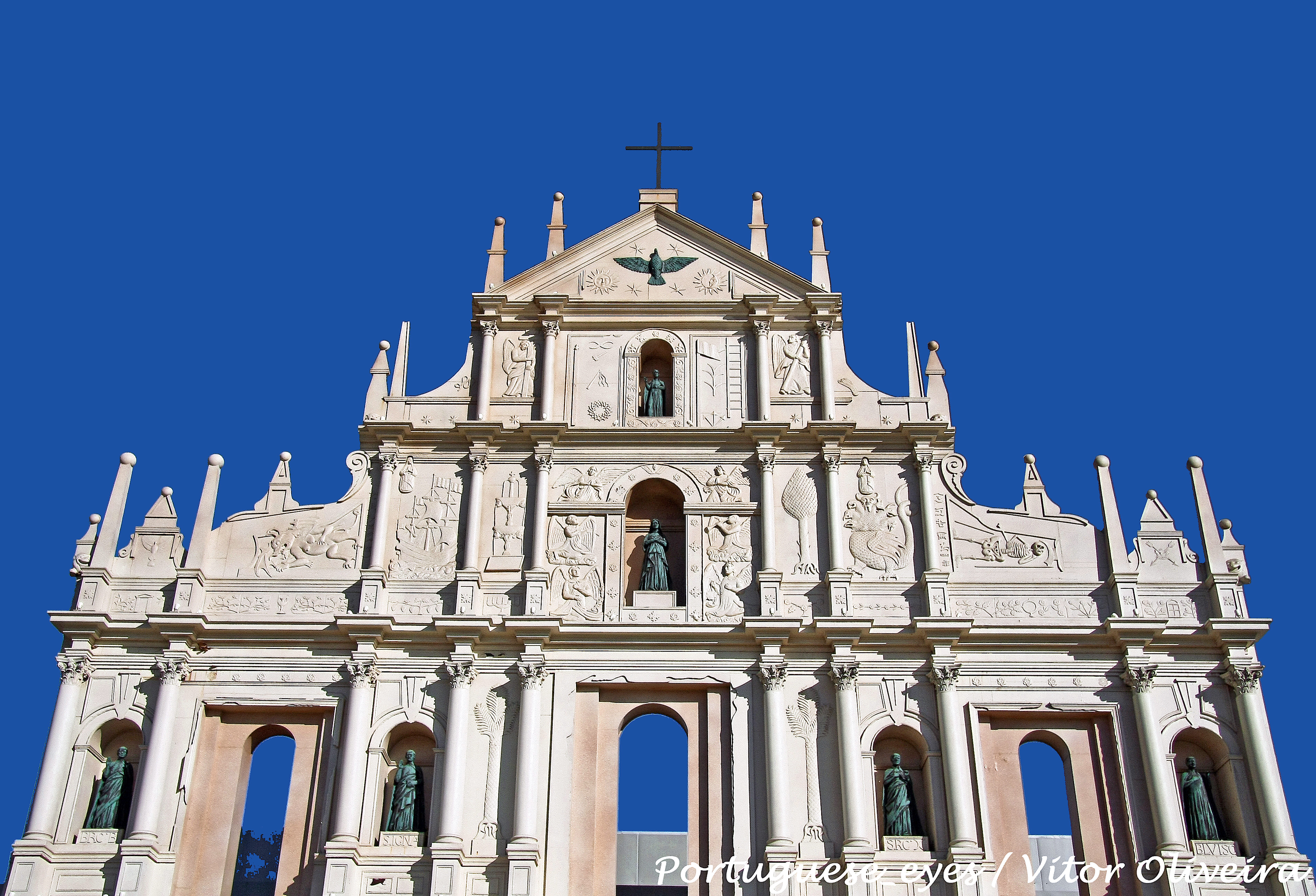
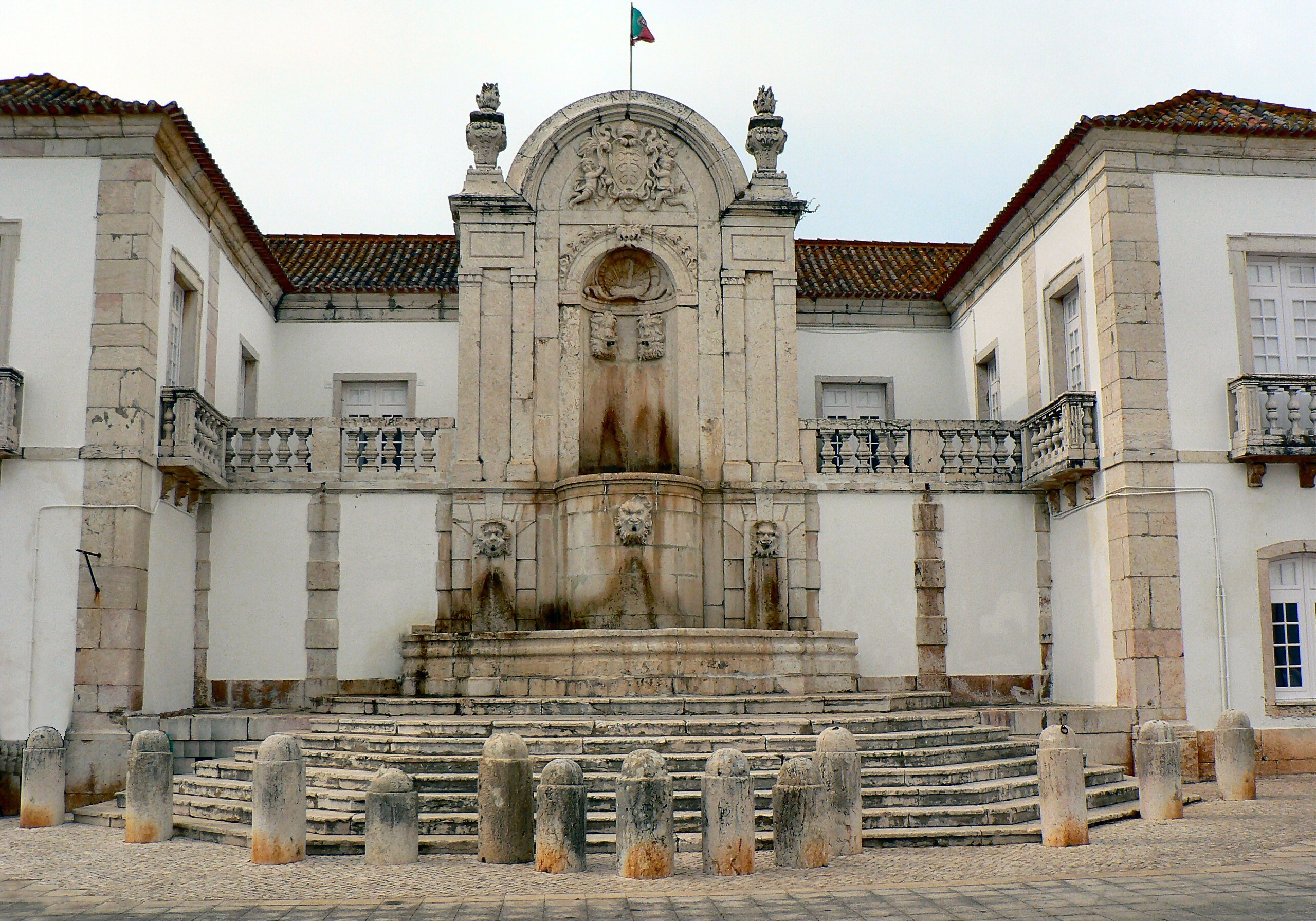
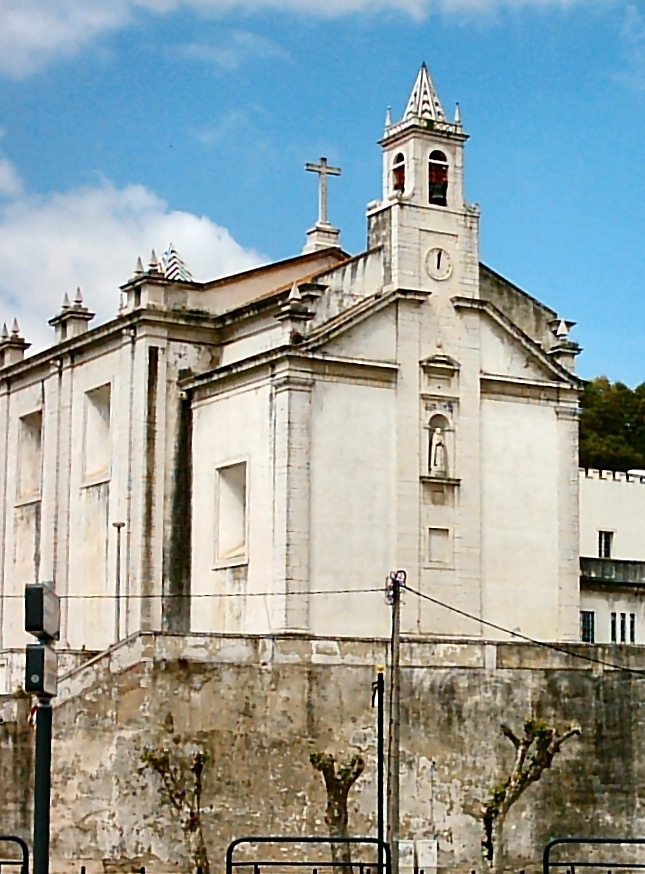
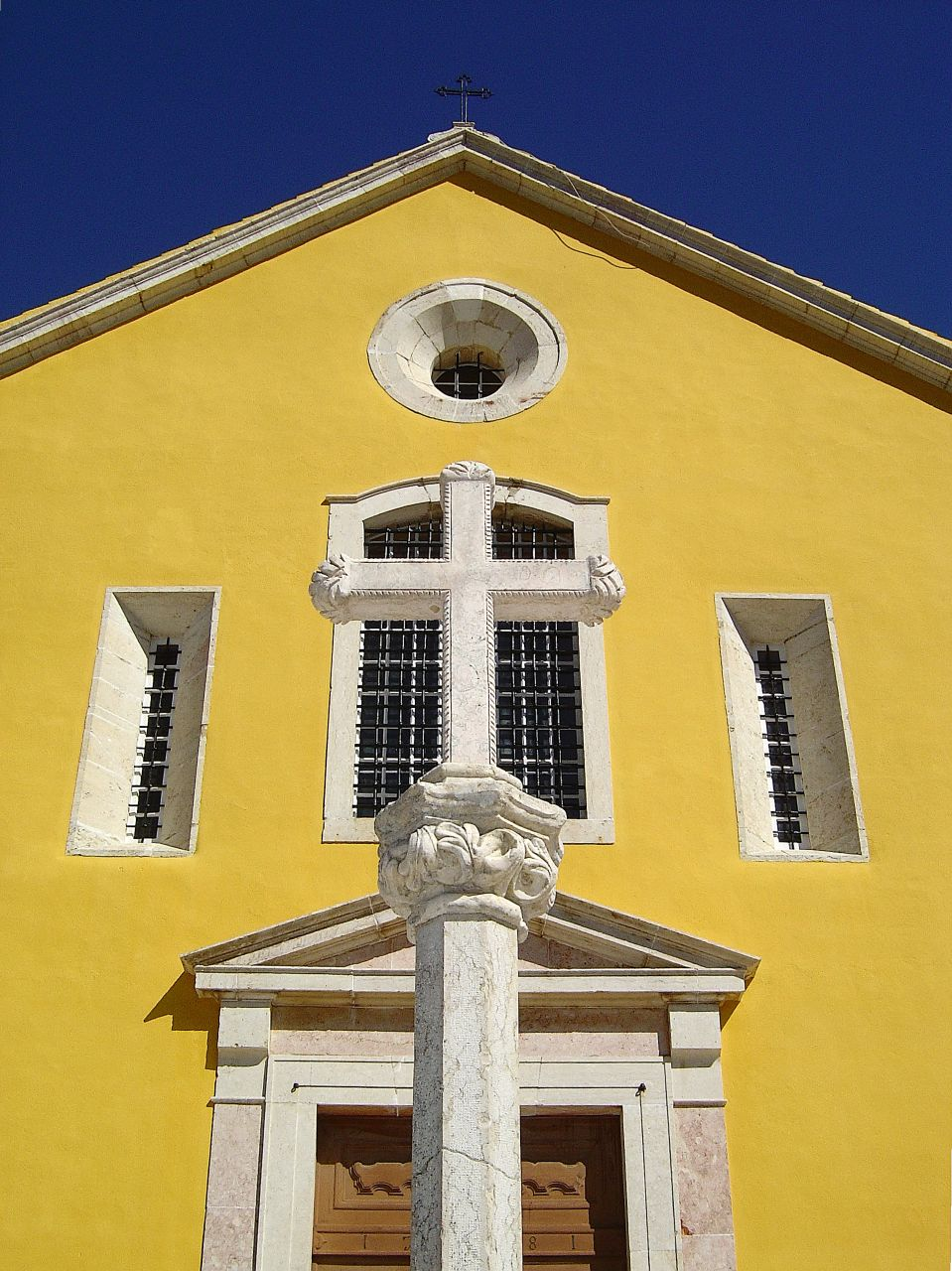
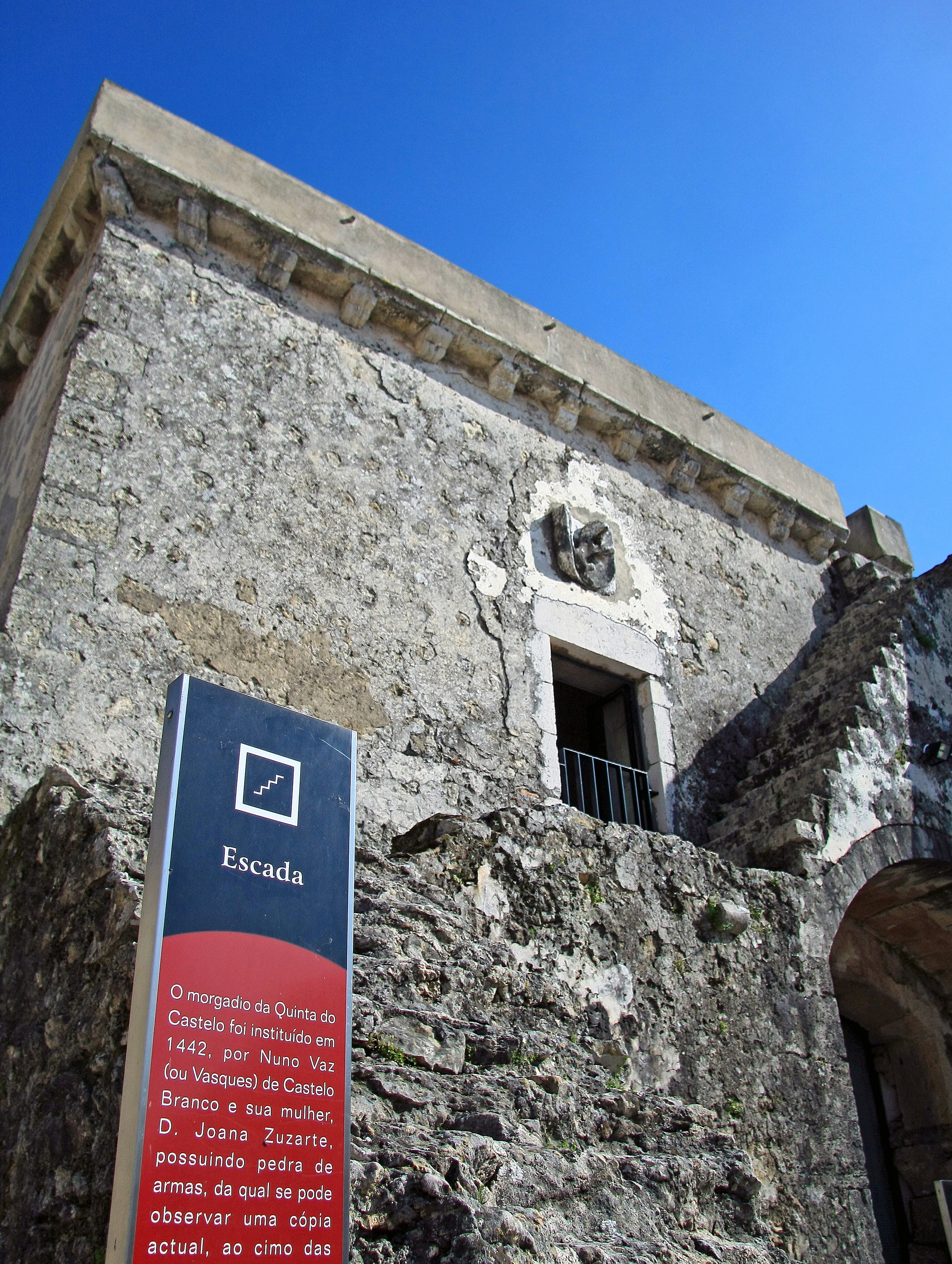
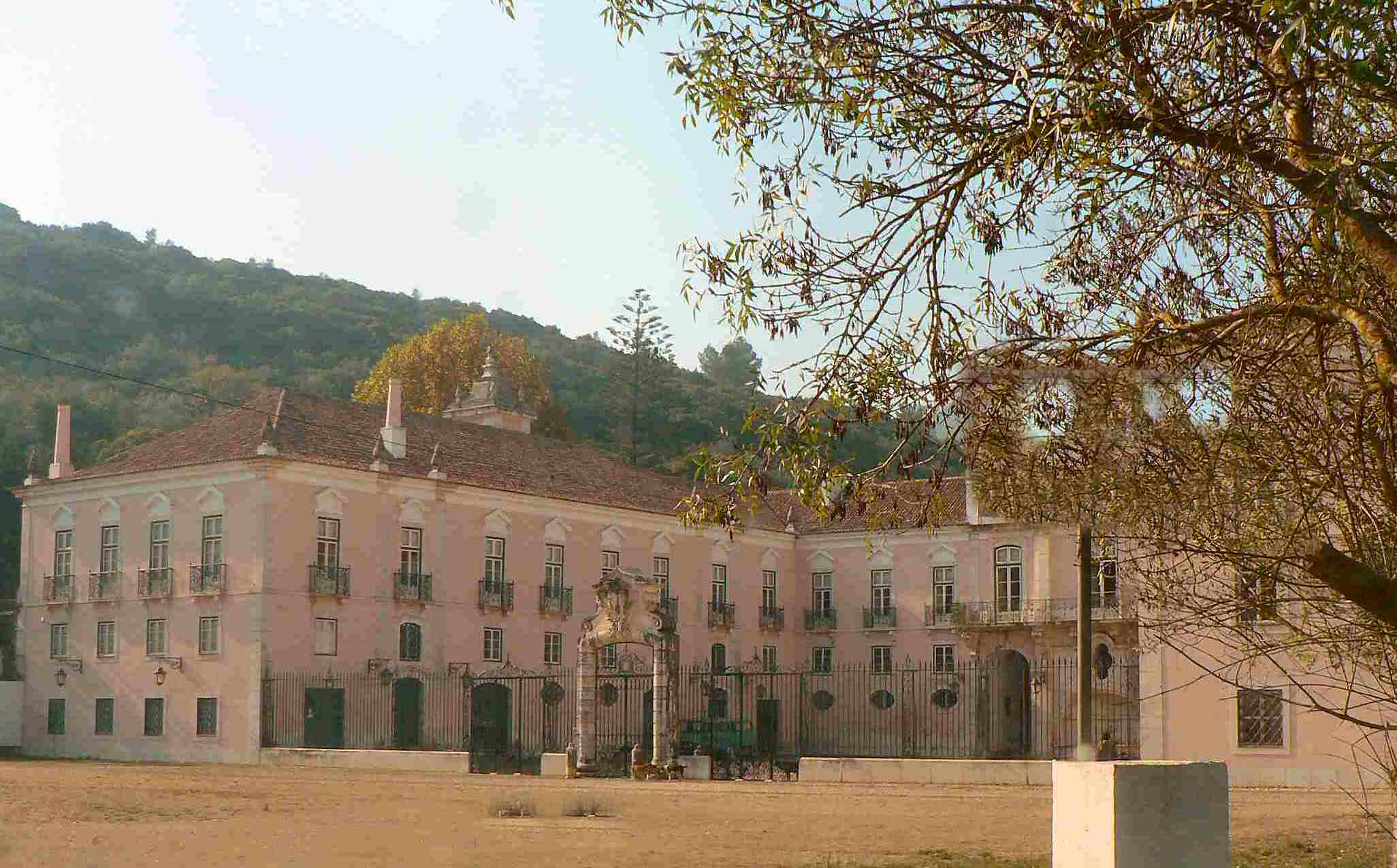

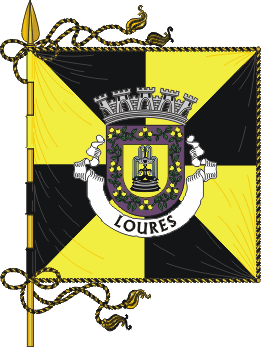
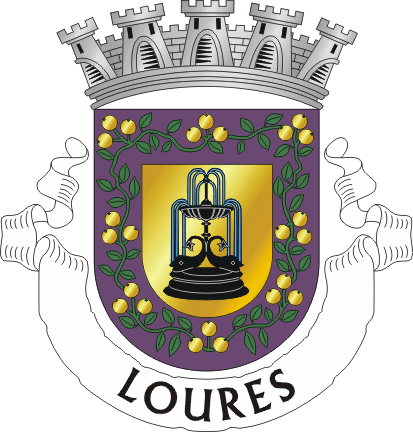
- Flag Coat of arms
- Interactive map of Loures
- Location in Portugal
- Coordinates: 38°50′N 9°10′W
- Country: Portugal
- Region: Lisbon
- Metropolitan area: Lisbon
- District: Lisbon
- Parishes: 10

Government
  - President: Ricardo Leão (PS)

Area
  - Total: 167.24 km^{2} (64.57 sq mi)

Population (2022)
  - Total: 201,632
  - Density: 1,205.6/km^{2} (3,122.6/sq mi)
- Time zone: UTC+00:00 (WET)
  - Summer (DST): UTC+01:00 (WEST)
- Local holiday: July 26
- Website: www.cm-loures.pt

Loures (locally [ˈloɾɨʃ]) is a city and a municipality in Portugal which is part of the District and Metropolitan area of Lisbon. It is the fifth most populous municipality in the country, with a total population of 201,632.

== History ==
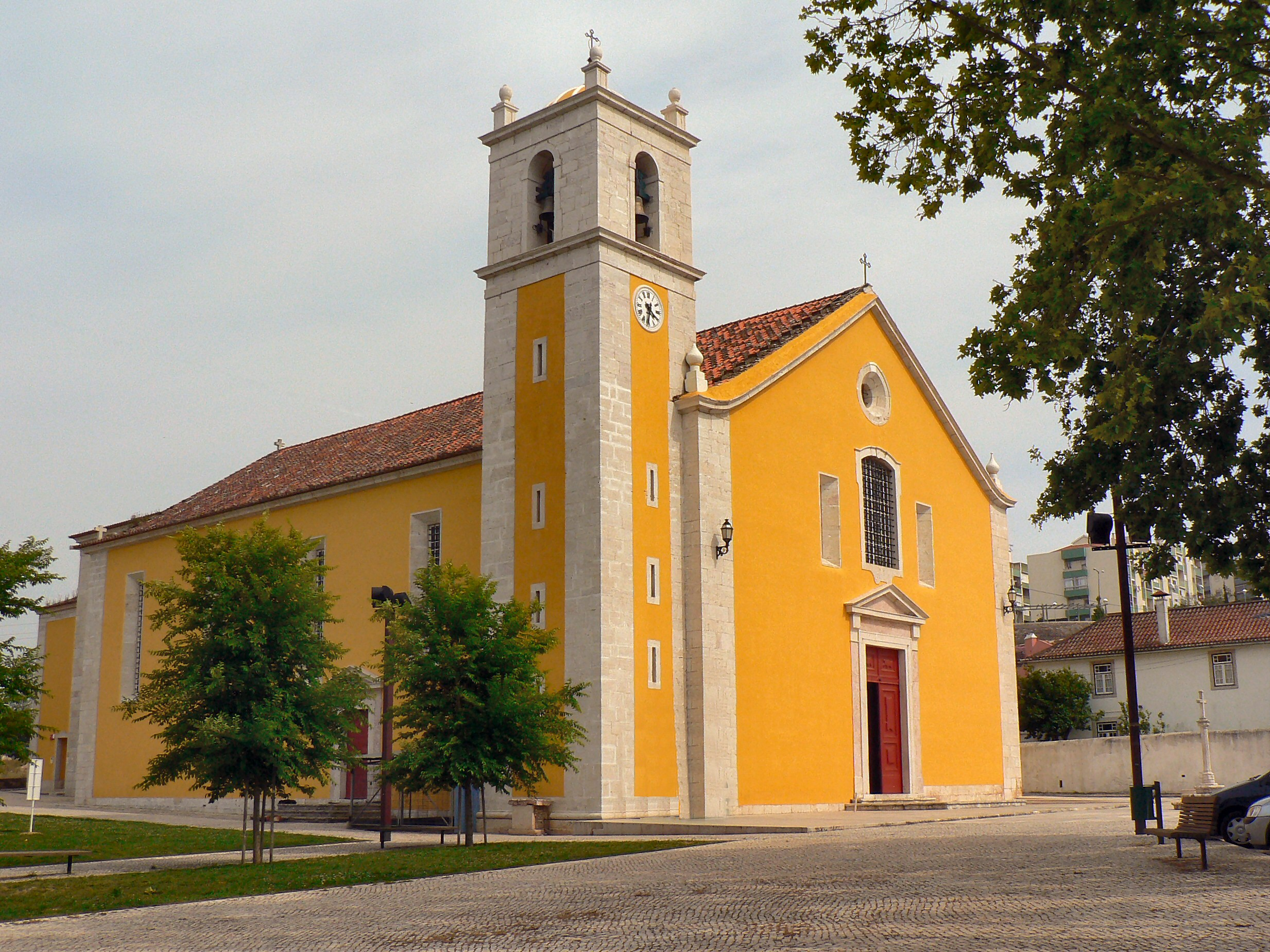
The historical Church of Loures, in the centre of urban centre of the town of Loures

There was early human settlement in the Loures area dating back to the Upper Paleolithic period, as evidenced by findings at the Cave of Pego do Diabo and the Cave of Salemas. Several Neolithic burial chambers have been identified, such as the Anta de Carcavelos and the Anta do Alto da Toupeira. Loures was a Roman settlement during the 1st millennium, based in a cemetery that eventually became the site of the first church. It was also a region notable for the presence of many castros, before the Roman occupation; the Romans influenced many of these settlers to abandon the foothills and begin occupying the fertile lowlands for economic reasons. After the Romans, the Visigoths began occupying the territory, followed by the Moors (after the 8th century).

The parish of Loures was first mentioned in 1118, and again in 1191, along with the parishes of Unhos and Sacavém. At the time the region was mainly agricultural, and involved in small export trade, that included the cultivation of lettuce (a vegetable that continues to be cultivated). The first written document appeared in 1170, written by Afonso Henriques, who provided privileges and benefits to the Moors that lived on the outskirts of Lisbon in the sallayos (the fields to the north of Lisbon, at the time). In 1178, King Sancho I of Portugal having discovered that the Moors of Lisbon were allied to groups in Loures, and came to the territory with a Templar force to confront those peoples. Following the defeat of the Moors, the King transferred the region to the Knights Templar, who established the sect of warrior-monks. The extinction of Templars in 1311, opened the way for the expropriation of lands and property by the Pope. King Denis of Portugal, on the other hand, proposed the creation in Portugal of a new Order to replace the Templars that would be the recipient of these assets: the Order of Christ. In Loures, the Templar lands passed into the hands of this religious order, eventually constructing a new Church over the ruins of the 4th-century temple, located alongside the Christian cemetery that existed there.

In addition to the main settlement, the village of Montemor, situated at a height of 350 metres, was sought by residents from Lisbon during the Plague. The Chapel of Nossa Senhora da Saúde was built during this era: in 1598, the Plague devastated the capital, and for five years on it spread across the country (resulting in the death of approximately 80,000 victims). Fleeing the contagion, many of urban residents escaped into the country to the elevated villages, which they assumed protected them from the disease. Some families brought with them the image of Our Lady of Health, and raised a church, in order to defend themselves of the Plague: by 1604 the threat had passed, and no cases of the disease were discovered within the territory. A myth developed for successive generations of the miraculous influence of the patron, providing protection from health-related disease.

By the 19th century, between 1832 and 1834, cholera spread throughout the region, and the people of Loures, once again, implored Our Lady of Health to protect them from epidemic. Owing to their fears, the image of the saint was removed from Montemor, and paraded through Loures in procession. It remained in the altar of the Church of Loures until the threat had passed, when it was finally returned to its hermitage in Montemor. Loures was elevated to the status of "town" on 26 October 1926, under decree 12/543, and later city on 9 August 1990, under decree 35/90.

In 1997 Odivelas and six other parishes (Caneças, Famões, Olival Basto, Póvoa de Santo Adrião and Ramada) were separated to form Odivelas Municipality.

In 2023, Loures is launching a project to improve affordable housing, provide low-income assistance programmes, and adapt infrastructure to adapt to climate change. The European Investment Bank will lend €100 million to fund projects from the Loures strategic multi-year investment plan for 2022-2026, to support the development and renewal of social housing, the building of educational institutions, and waste management.

This project will build 793 new social housing units and rehabilitate 1 171 existing apartments. The goal is to enhance the living circumstances of the city's most disadvantaged residents while also creating a more inclusive atmosphere for all residents. Approximately 850 families are living in extremely difficult circumstances. The city intends to address these issues while also making the city more appealing to newcomers from Lisbon.

Loures council established a Municipal Action Plan for Climate Change Adaptation in 2021.

== Geography ==
Loures borders the municipalities of Odivelas, Sintra, Mafra, Arruda dos Vinhos, Vila Franca de Xira and Lisbon. The municipality is traditionally divided in three areas: the rustic one, to the north (the parishes of Lousa, Fanhões, Bucelas, Santo Antão do Tojal and São Julião do Tojal), the urban one, to the south (Frielas, Loures and Santo António dos Cavaleiros) and the urban-industrial, to the east (Apelação, Bobadela, Camarate, Moscavide, Portela de Sacavém, Prior Velho, Sacavém, Santa Iria de Azóia, São João da Talha and Unhos). Portela de Sacavém is the site of Portugal's largest airport.

In this eastern area, the ten local parishes claim to be independent from Loures, and form its own municipality set in the town of Sacavém. This struggle dates from the beginnings of the Portuguese Republic, and has a very strong support among the local population.

== Climate ==
Climate data for São Julião do Tojal, Loures
Month	Jan	Feb	Mar	Apr	May	Jun	Jul	Aug	Sep	Oct	Nov	Dec	Year
Average precipitation mm (inches)	103 (4.1)	93 (3.7)	77 (3.0)	56 (2.2)	45 (1.8)	16 (0.6)	3 (0.1)	5 (0.2)	29 (1.1)	75 (3.0)	106 (4.2)	105 (4.1)	713 (28.1)
Source: Portuguese Environment Agency

== Notable people ==
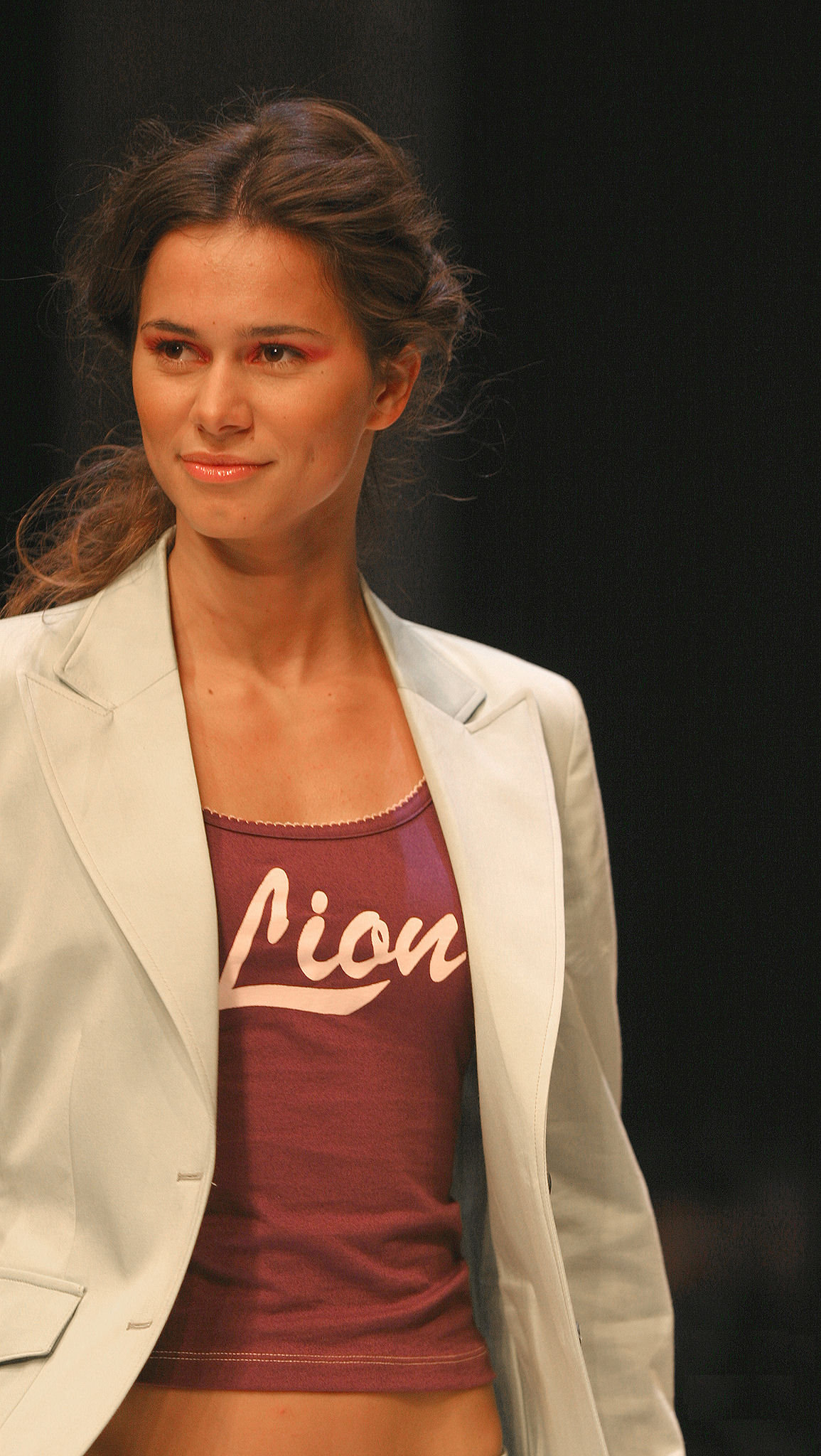
Claudia Vieira, 2005

- Baltasar Barreira (1531–1612) a Portuguese Jesuit missionary to Africa.
- Félix de Avelar Brotero (1744–1828) a botanist and professor, fled to France in 1788 to escape the Portuguese Inquisition
- Capt. José Manuel Malhão Pereira (born 1940) a retired Portuguese Navy officer and scholar of nautical sciences
- Jerónimo de Sousa (born 1947) a politician, candidate in the 2006 presidential election
- Cláudia Vieira (born 1978) a Portuguese actress, model and TV presenter.
- Rita Pereira (born 1981), known as Rita Redshoes, is a solo alternative rock singer

=== Sport ===
- Eduardo Luís (born 1955) a retired Portuguese footballer with 277 club caps
- António Pimparel (born 1982), better known as Beto, a footballer with over 400 club caps and 16 with Portugal
- Sónia Matias (born 1983) a Portuguese former footballer with 55 caps with Portugal women

== Parishes ==
Administratively, the municipality is divided into 10 civil parishes (freguesias):

- Bucelas
- Camarate, Unhos e Apelação
- Fanhões
- Loures
- Lousa
- Moscavide e Portela
- Sacavém e Prior Velho
- Santa Iria de Azoia
- São João da Talha e Bobadela
- Santo Antão e São Julião do Tojal
- Santo António dos Cavaleiros e Frielas

From these, both Loures and Sacavém are cities, and Bobadela, Bucelas, Camarate, Moscavide, Santa Iria de Azóia, Santo António dos Cavaleiros and São João da Talha are towns.

== International relations ==
Loures is twinned with:

- Armamar, Portugal (1993)
- Maio, Cape Verde (1993)
- Matola, Mozambique (1996)
- Diu Island, India (1998)

== See also ==
- History of Sacavém
