= Azulejo =

Portuguese and Spanish painted tiles

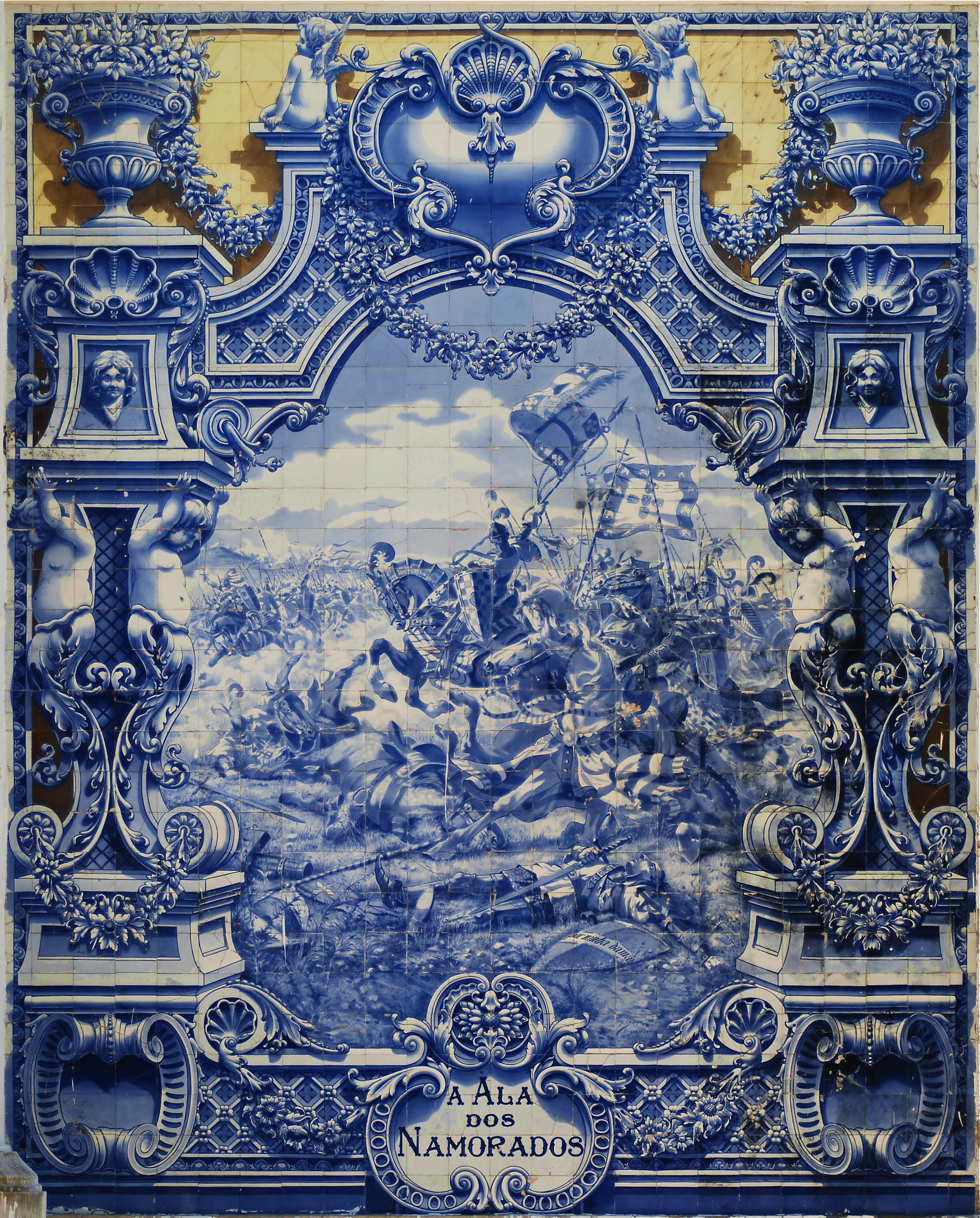
Panel of the Battle of Aljubarrota by Portuguese artist Jorge Colaço, 1922

Azulejo (Portuguese: [ɐzuˈle(j)ʒu, ɐzuˈlɐjʒu], Spanish: [aθuˈlexo]; from the Arabic الزليج, al-zillīj) is a form of Iberian painted tin-glazed ceramic tilework. They are an ornamental art form, but also had a specific function, such as aiding temperature control in homes. There is also a tradition of their production in former Portuguese and Spanish colonies in North America, South America, the Philippines, Goa, Lusophone Africa, East Timor, and Macau. Azulejos constitute a major aspect of Portuguese and Spanish architecture to this day, and are found on buildings across Portugal, Spain and their former territories. Many azulejos chronicle major historical and cultural aspects of Portuguese and Spanish history.

In Spanish and Portuguese, azulejo is the everyday word for (any) tile.

== Etymology ==
The word azulejo (as well as the Ligurian laggion) is derived from the Arabic الزليج (al-zillīj), zellij meaning "polished stone" because the original idea was to imitate the Byzantine and Roman mosaics.

== History ==
=== 13th to 15th centuries ===
The Spanish city of Seville became the major centre of the Hispano-Moresque tile industry. The earliest azulejos in the 13th century were panels of tile-mosaic known as alicatados (from Arabic: ﻗَﻄَﻊَ, romanized: qata'a, lit. 'to cut'), known as zellij in Islamic architecture. Tiles were glazed in a single color, cut into geometric shapes, and assembled to form geometric patterns. There are many examples in the Alhambra of Granada. This tradition was continued for a time in Mudéjar architecture in Spain (e.g. in the 14th-century sections of the Alcázar of Seville), and has been perpetuated to this day in Morocco.

When former Moorish-controlled territories came under Spanish rule in Spain, new techniques of tile-making developed from the older Andalusi traditions. As wealthy Spaniards favoured the Mudéjar style to decorate their residences, the demand for mosaic tilework in this style increased beyond what tilemakers could produce, requiring them to consider new methods. Towards the late 15th and early 16th centuries, Seville became an important production center for a type of tile known as cuenca ("hollow") or arista ("ridge"). In this technique, motifs were formed by pressing a metal or wooden mould over the unbaked tile, leaving a motif delineated by thin ridges of clay that prevented the different colours in between from bleeding into each other during baking. This was similar to the older cuerda seca technique but more efficient for mass production. The motifs on these tiles imitated earlier Islamic and Mudéjar designs from the zellij mosaic tradition or blended them with contemporary European influences such as Gothic or Italian Renaissance. Following their development, arista tiles grew in prominence during this period due to the streamlined manufacturing process and their ability to more readily incorporate epigraphical works associated with the Reconquista. Prominent examples of these tiles can be found in the early 16th-century decoration of the Casa de Pilatos in Seville. This type of tile was produced well into the 17th century, and was widely exported from Spain to other European countries and to the Spanish colonies in the Americas.

The same techniques were introduced into Portugal by King Manuel I after a visit to Seville in 1503. They were applied on walls and used for paving floors, as can be seen in several rooms, especially the Arab Room of the Sintra National Palace (including the famous cuenca tiles with the armillary sphere, symbol of king Manuel I). The Portuguese adopted the Moorish tradition of horror vacui ('fear of empty spaces') and covered the walls completely with azulejos.

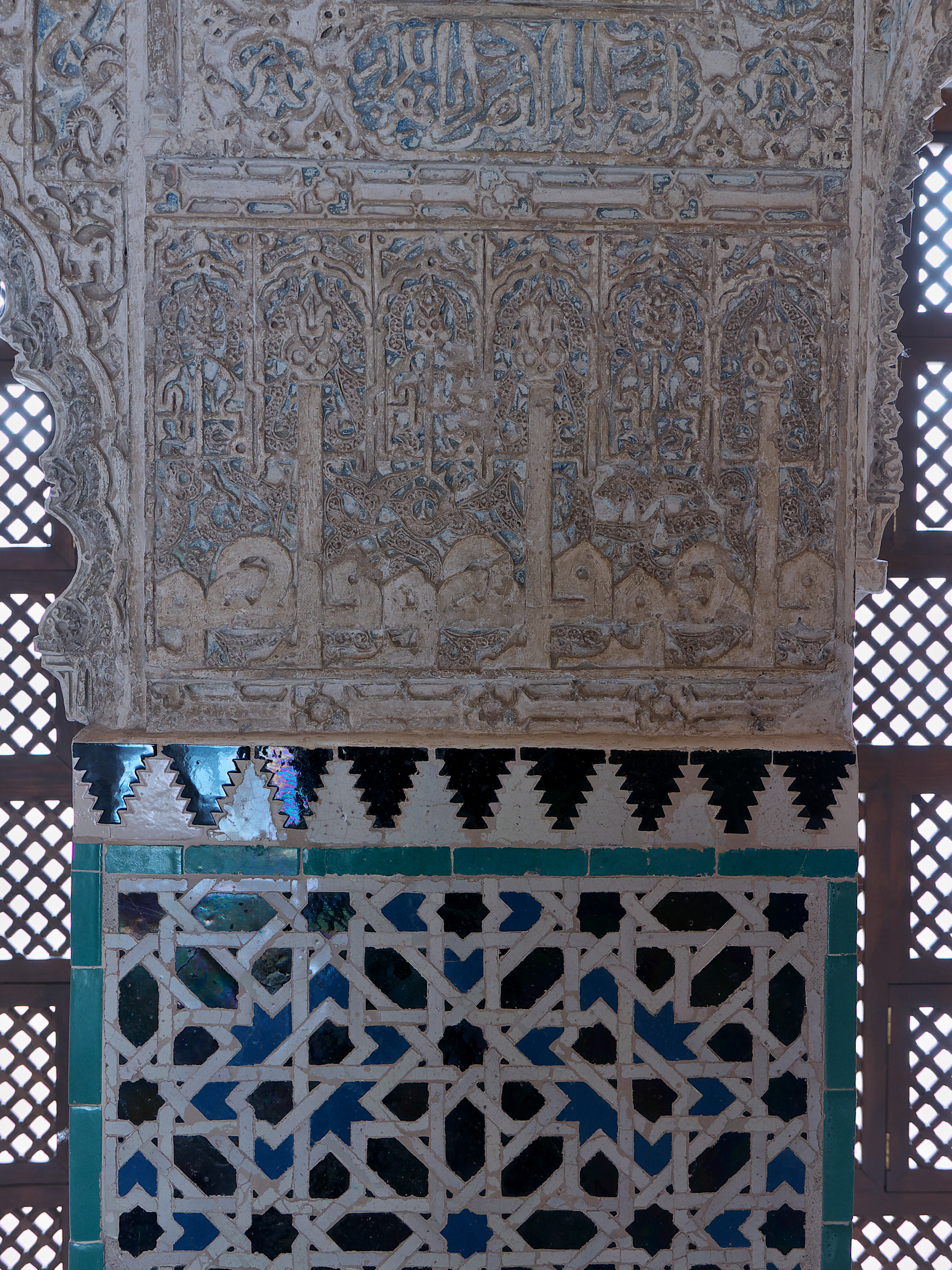
(Moorish) Alicatado (ca. 13th century) in the Cuarto Real de Santo Domingo, Granada

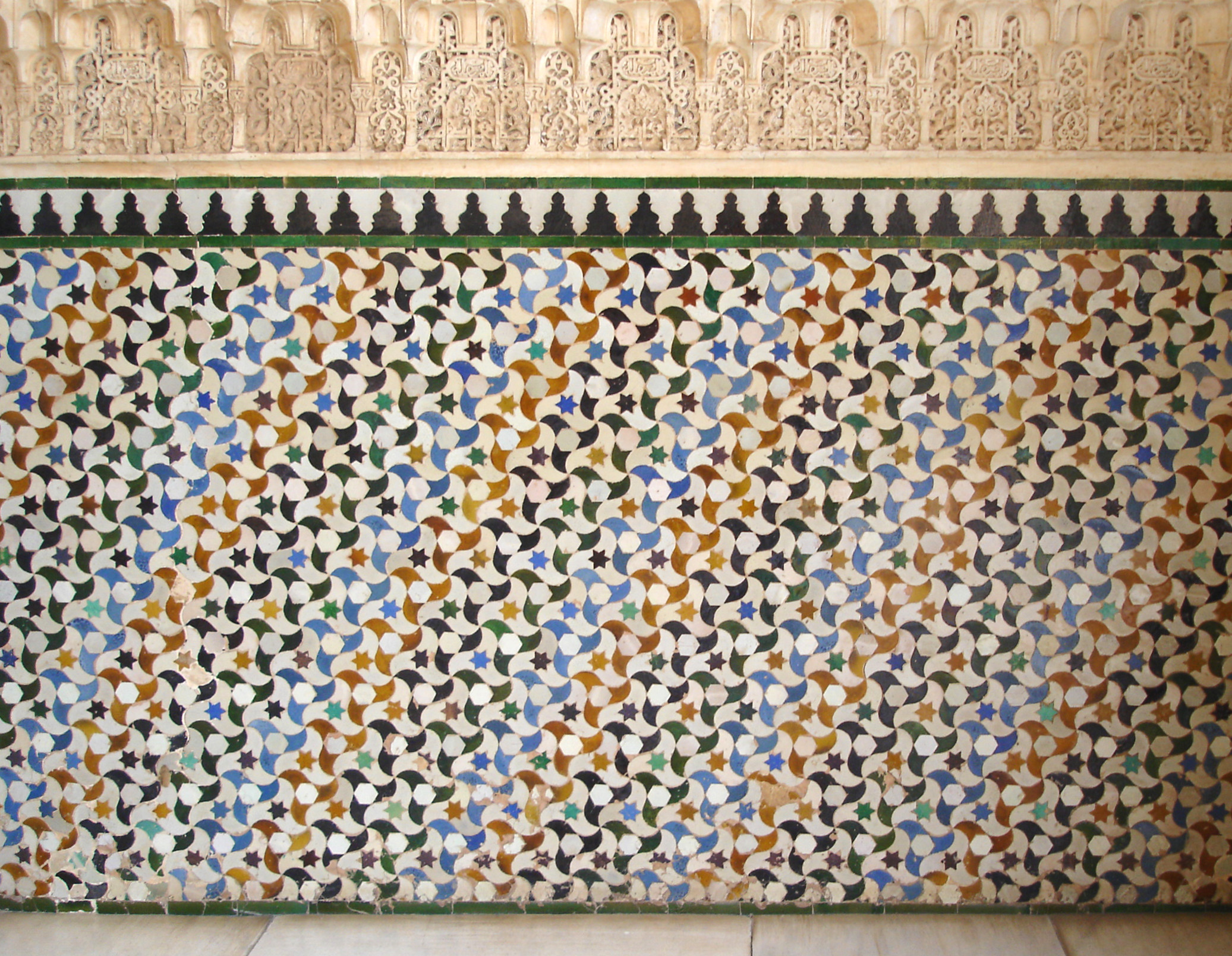
(Moorish) Alicatado in the Alhambra (14th century), Granada

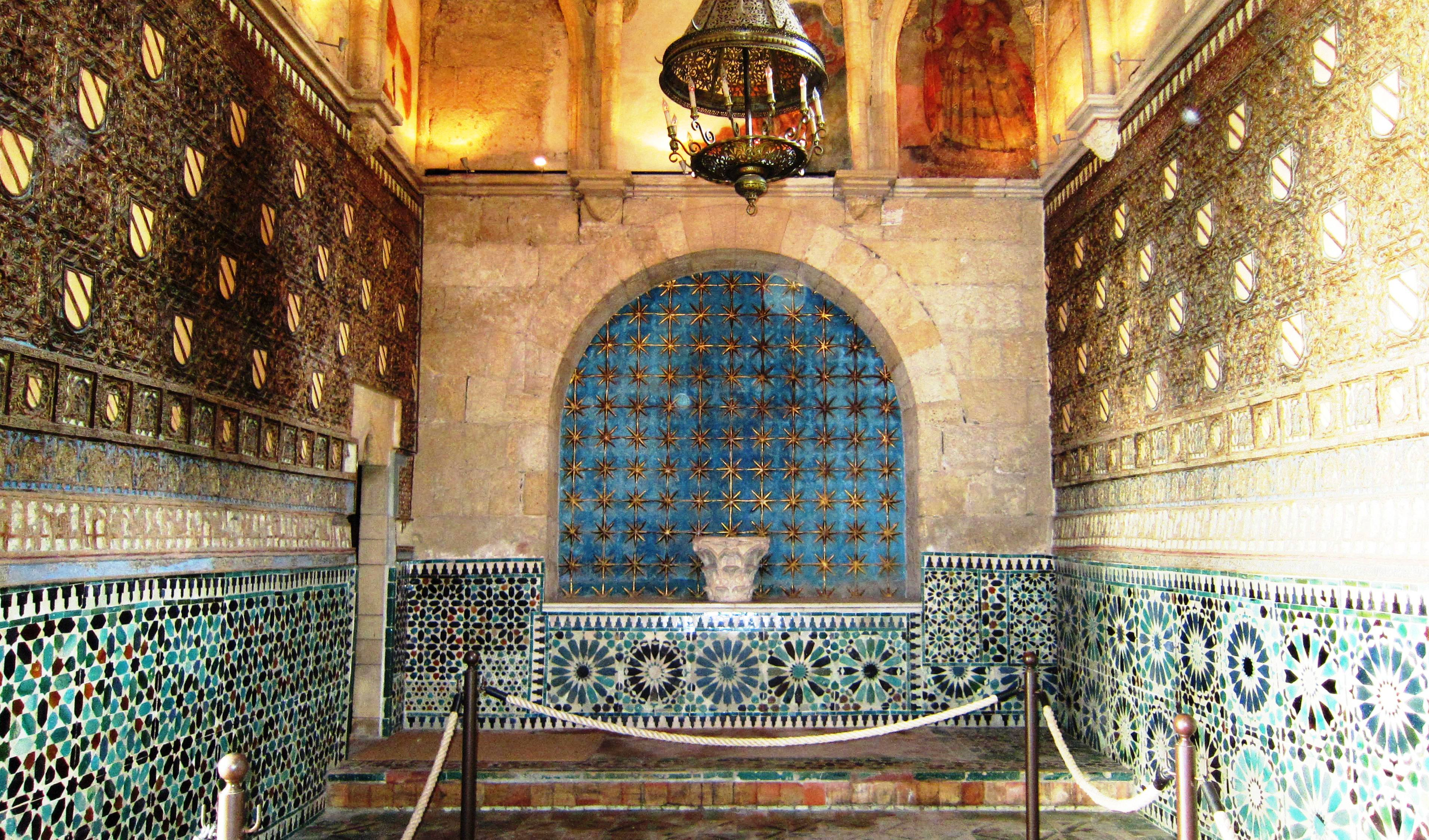
(Christian) Capilla de San Bartolomé (ca. 1410), Córdoba

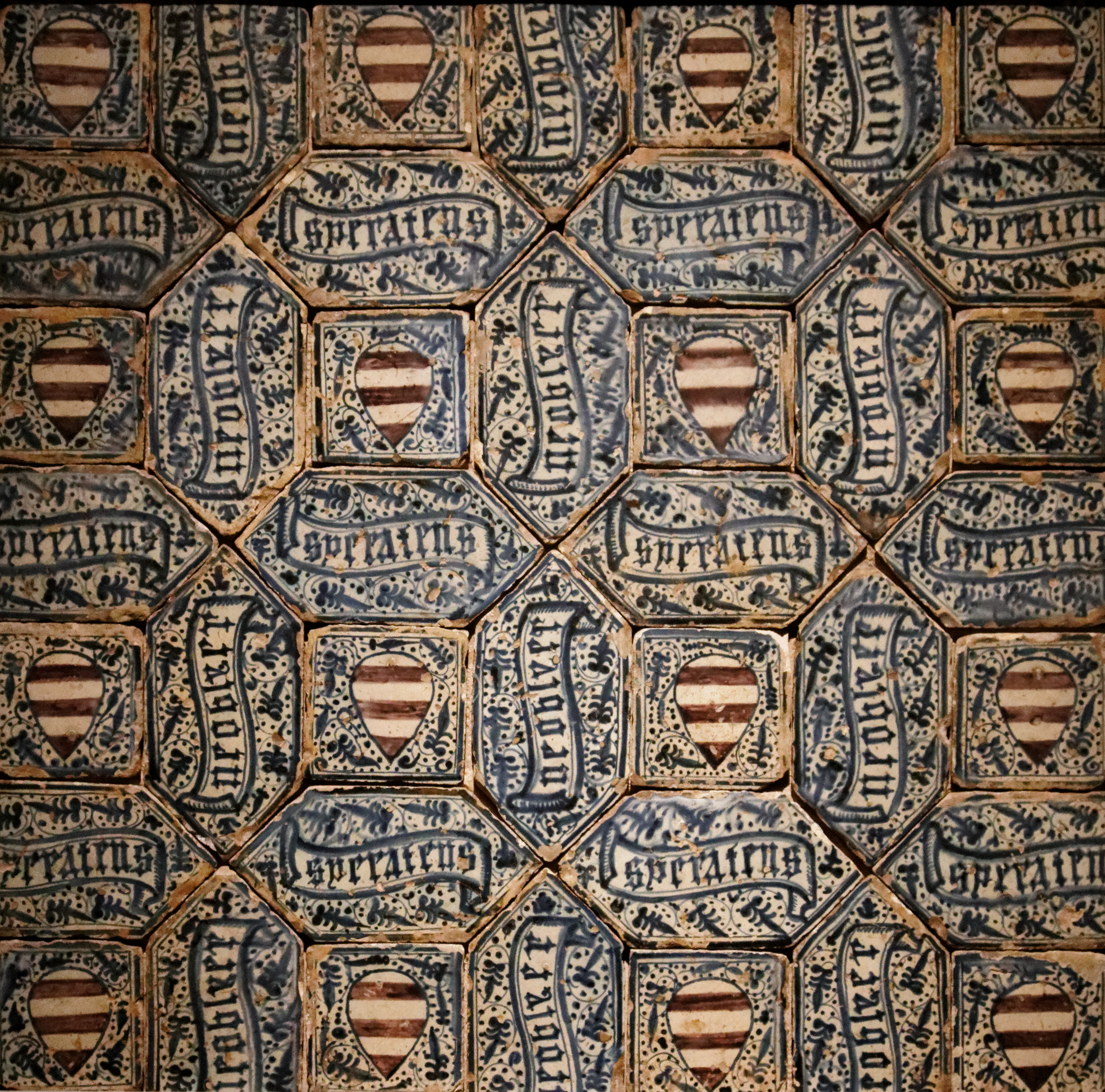
(Christian) Alfardones, ca. 1420, Manises, Spain

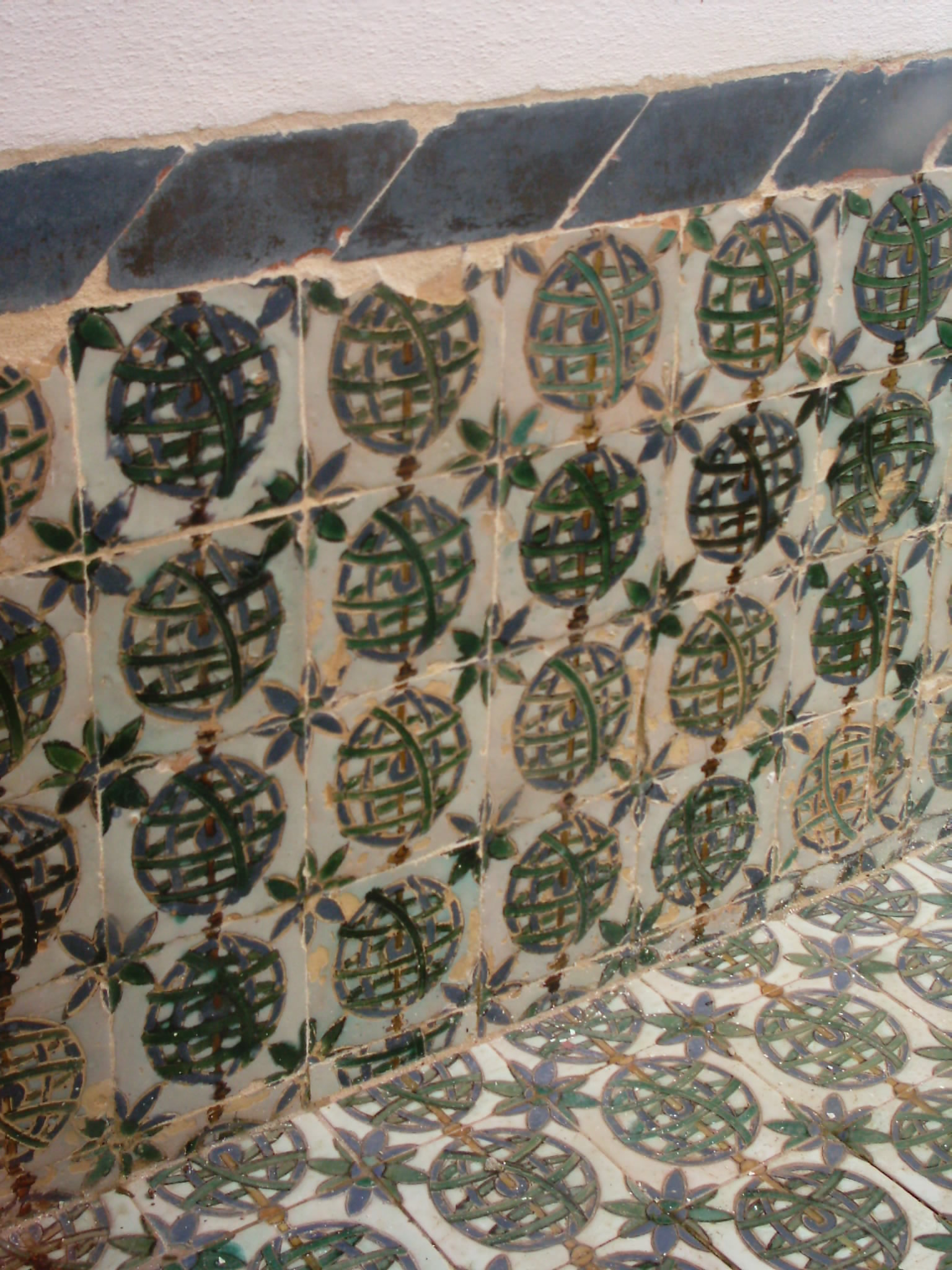
(Christian) Azulejos of the 15th century of the Sintra National Palace, Portugal

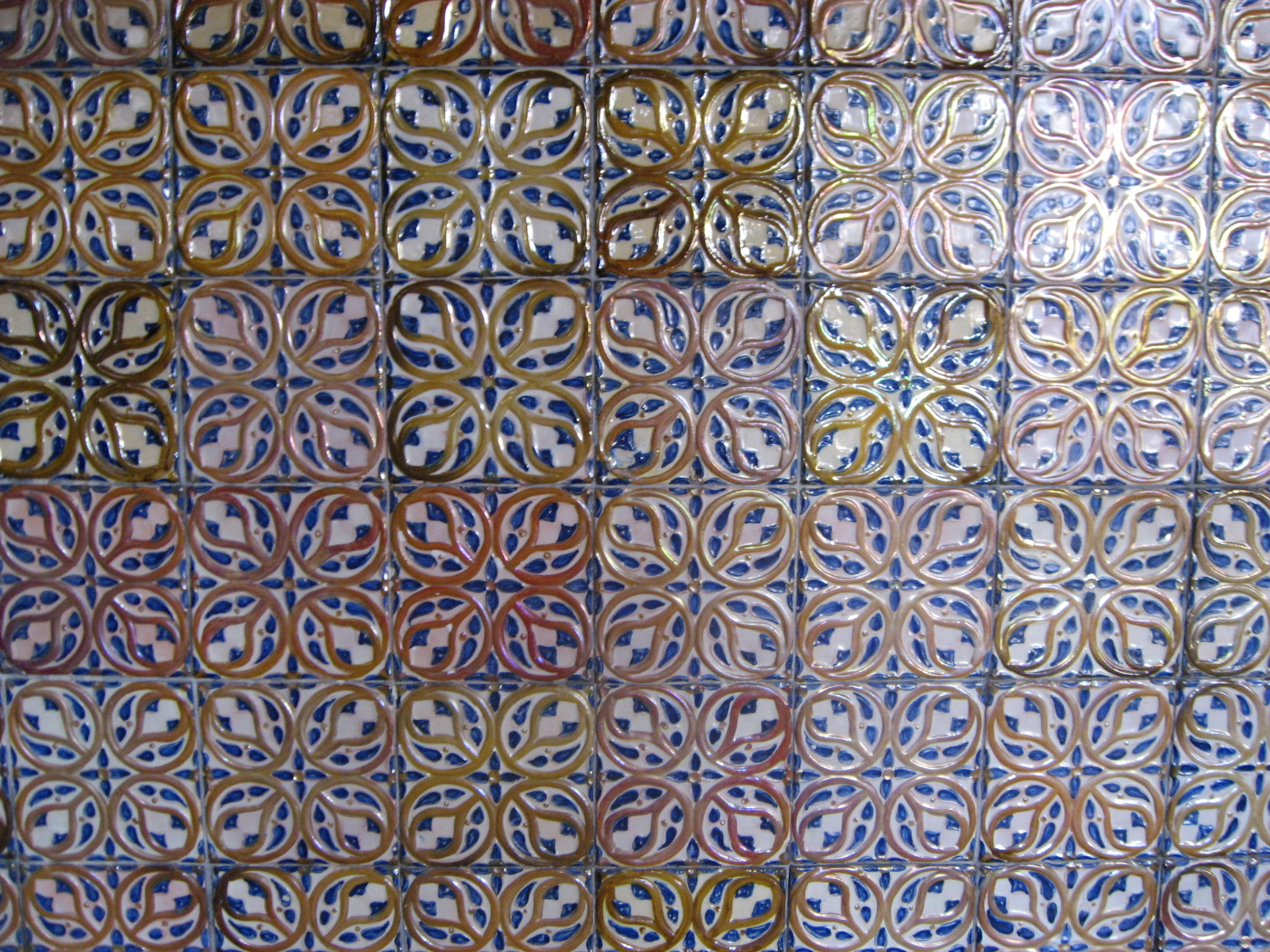
(Christian) Tiles in Alcázar of Segovia

=== 16th century ===
Potters from Italy came into Seville in the early 16th century and established workshops there. They brought with them the maiolica techniques which allowed the artists to represent a much larger number of figurative themes in their compositions. The first Italian potter to move into Spain was Francisco Niculoso who settled in Seville in 1498. Niculoso's arrival led to the development of Sevillian tiles, often referred to as planos; and a new decorative technique known as pisanos, that incorporated maiolica technique with the new medium for azulejos. Examples of Niculoso's work are hosted in situ in the Alcazar of Seville. Numerous azulejos from this period—often influenced by Renaissance trends introduced by Niculoso and other Italian artisans— took the form of polychrome tile panels depicting religious and mythological themes, or hunting scenes.

Until the mid-16th century the Portuguese continued to rely on foreign imports, mostly from Spain, such as the Annunciation by Francisco Niculoso in Évora, but also on a smaller scale from Antwerp (Flanders), such as the two panels by Jan Bogaerts in the Paço Ducal of Vila Viçosa (Alentejo). One of the early Portuguese masters of the 16th century was Marçal de Matos, to whom Susanna and the Elders (1565), in Quinta da Bacalhoa, Azeitão, is attributed, as well as the Adoration of the Shepherds (in the National Museum of Azulejos in Lisbon). The Miracle of St. Roque (in the Church of S. Roque, Lisbon) is the first dated Portuguese azulejo composition (1584). It is the work of Francisco de Matos, probably the nephew and pupil of Marçal de Matos. Both drew their inspiration from Renaissance and Mannerist paintings and engravings from Italy and Flanders. A fine collection of 16th-century azulejos (azulejos Hispano-mouriscos) can be found in the Museu da Rainha D. Leonor in Beja, Portugal (the former Convento da Conceição).

In the late 16th century, checkered azulejos were used as decoration for large surfaces, such as in churches and monasteries. Diagonally placed plain white tiles were surrounded by blue square ones and narrow border tiles.

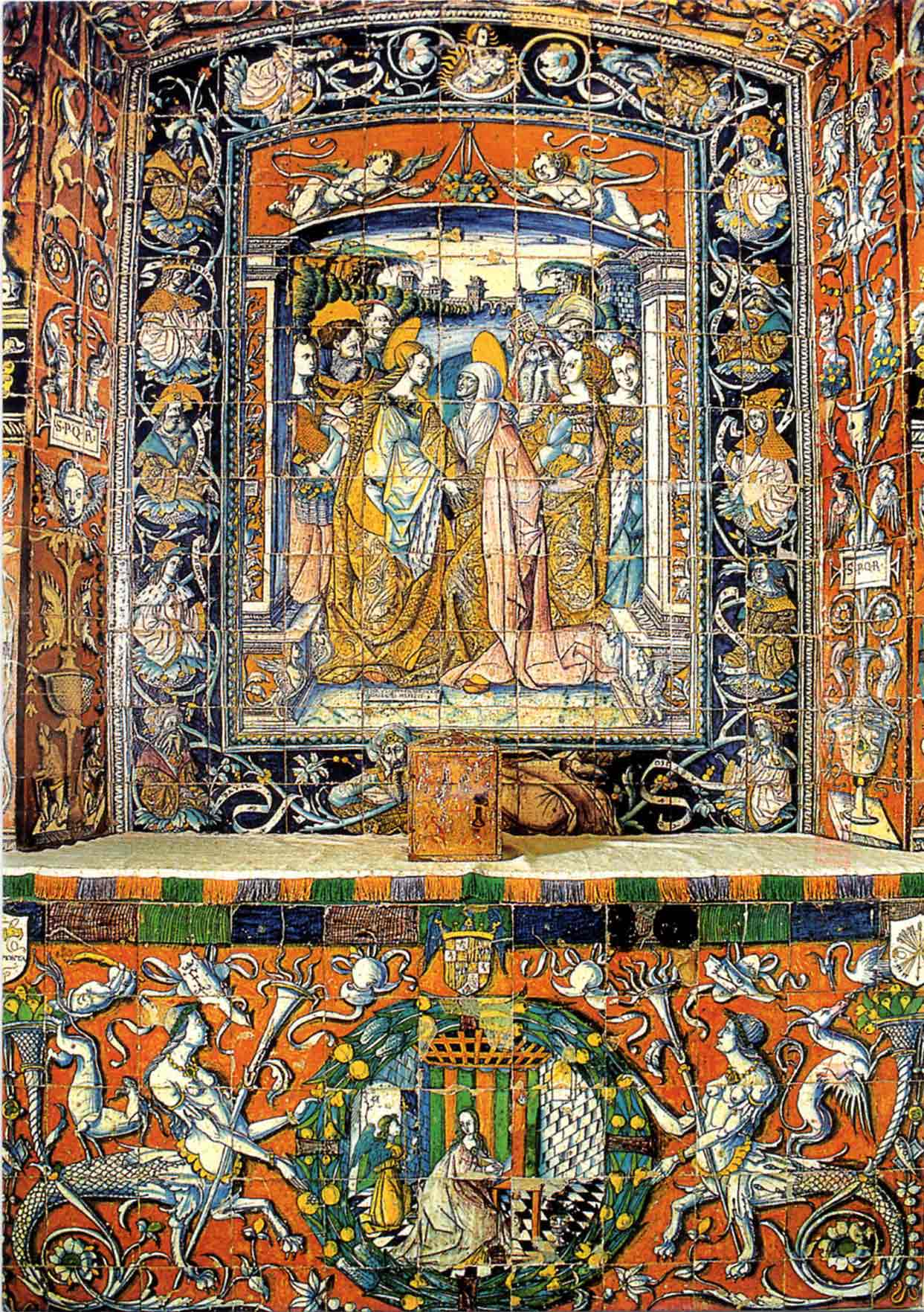
Chapel of the Alcázar of Seville (Spain) covered with tin-glazed tiles painted in 1504 by the Pisan Francesco Niculoso.

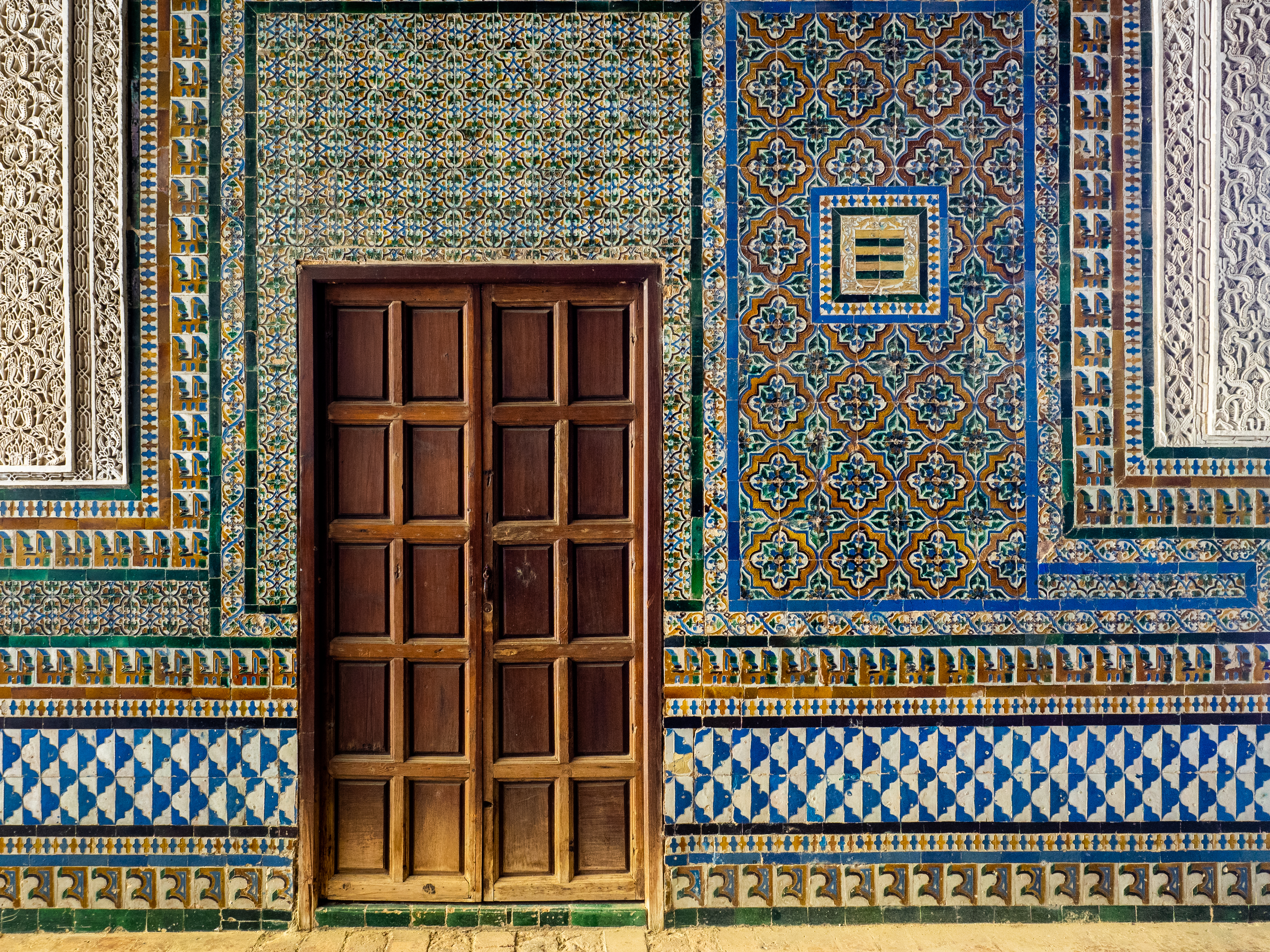
Casa de Pilatos in Seville has around 150 different azulejo designs of the 1530s, one of the largest antique collections in the world

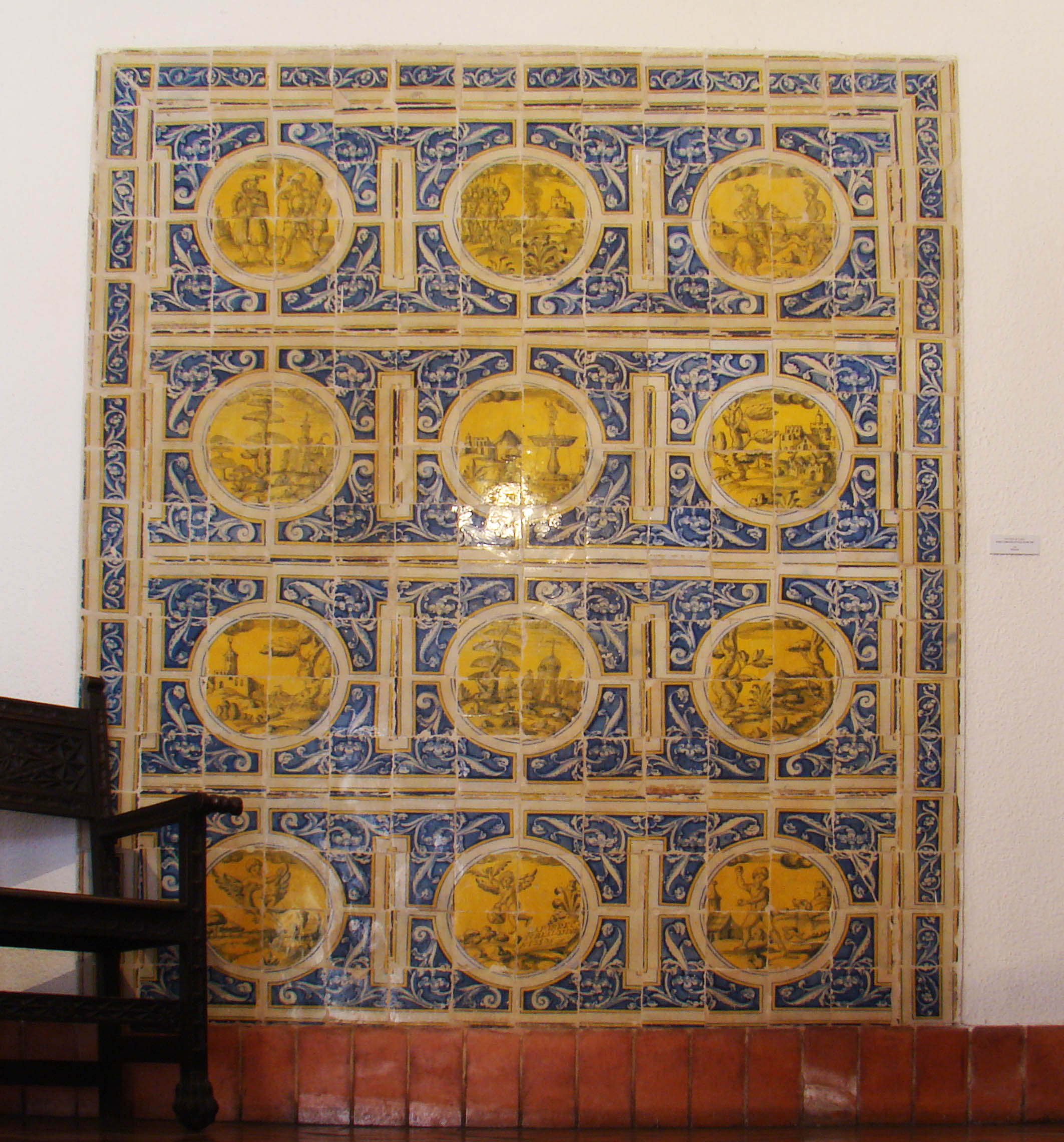
Panel of Hernando de Loaysa, around 1590, Palacio de Fabio Nelli, Valladolid, Spain.

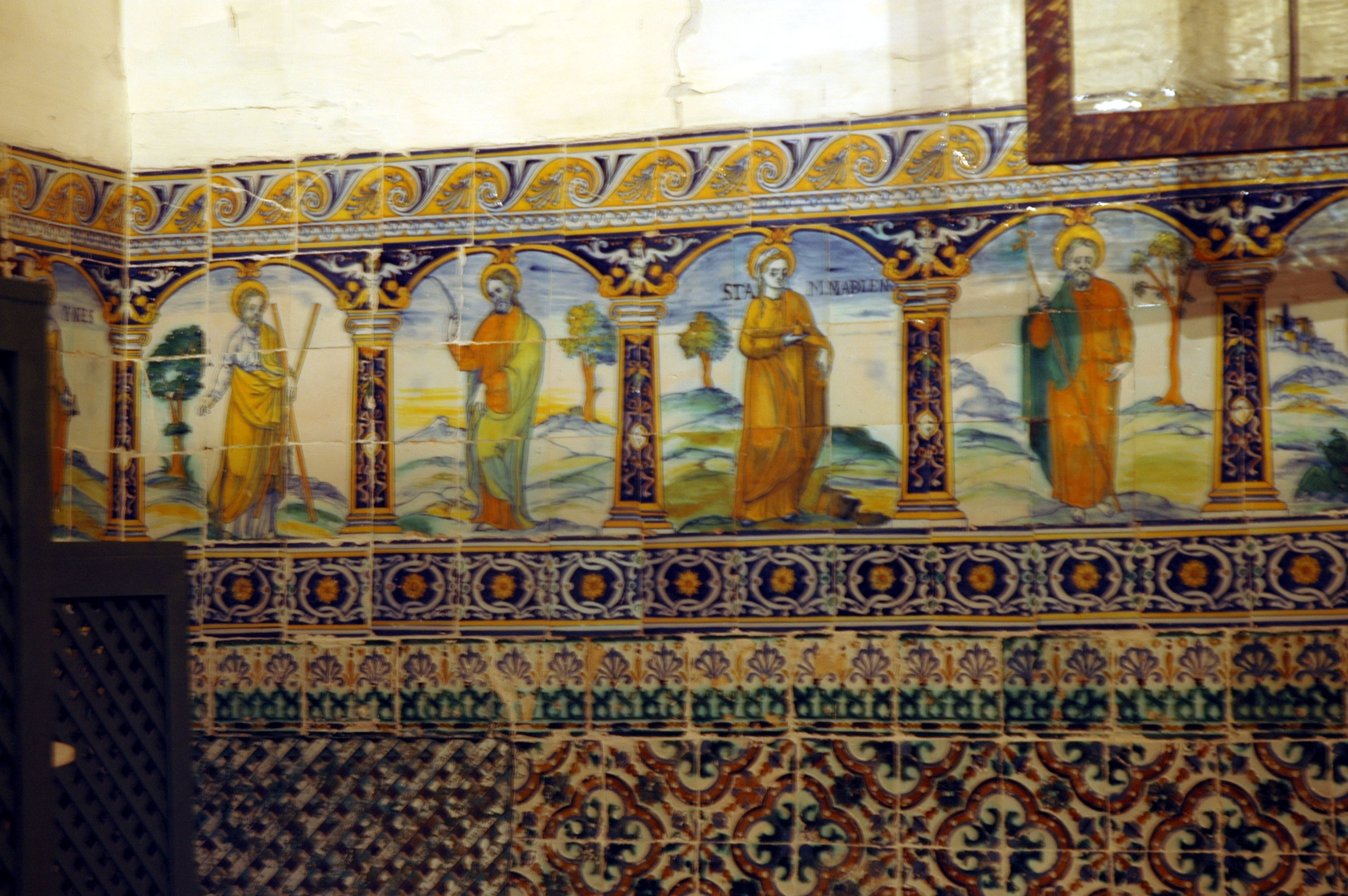
16th-century azulejos in Convent of Santa Isabel, Valladolid

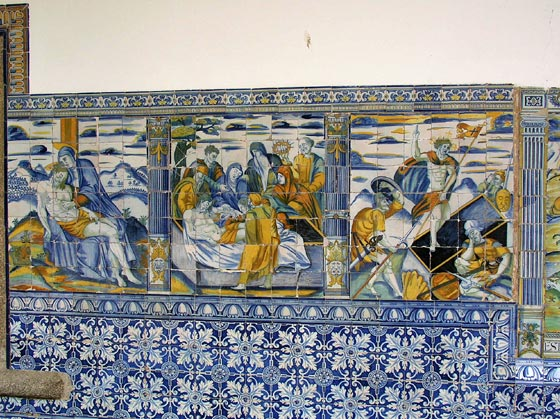
Basílica de Nuestra Señora del Prado, Talavera de la Reina, Spain.

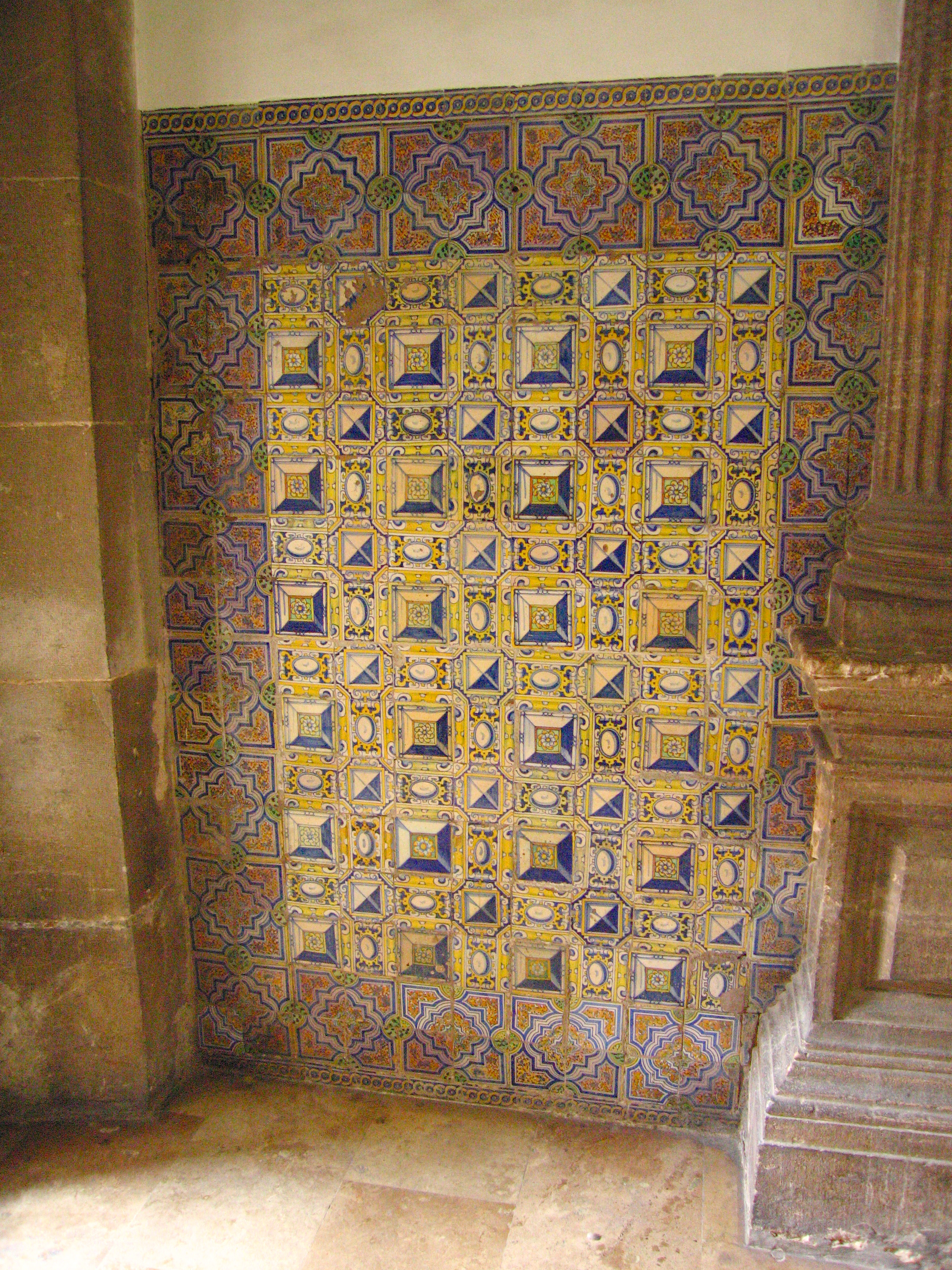
Real Colegio Seminario del Corpus Christi, Valencia, Spain.

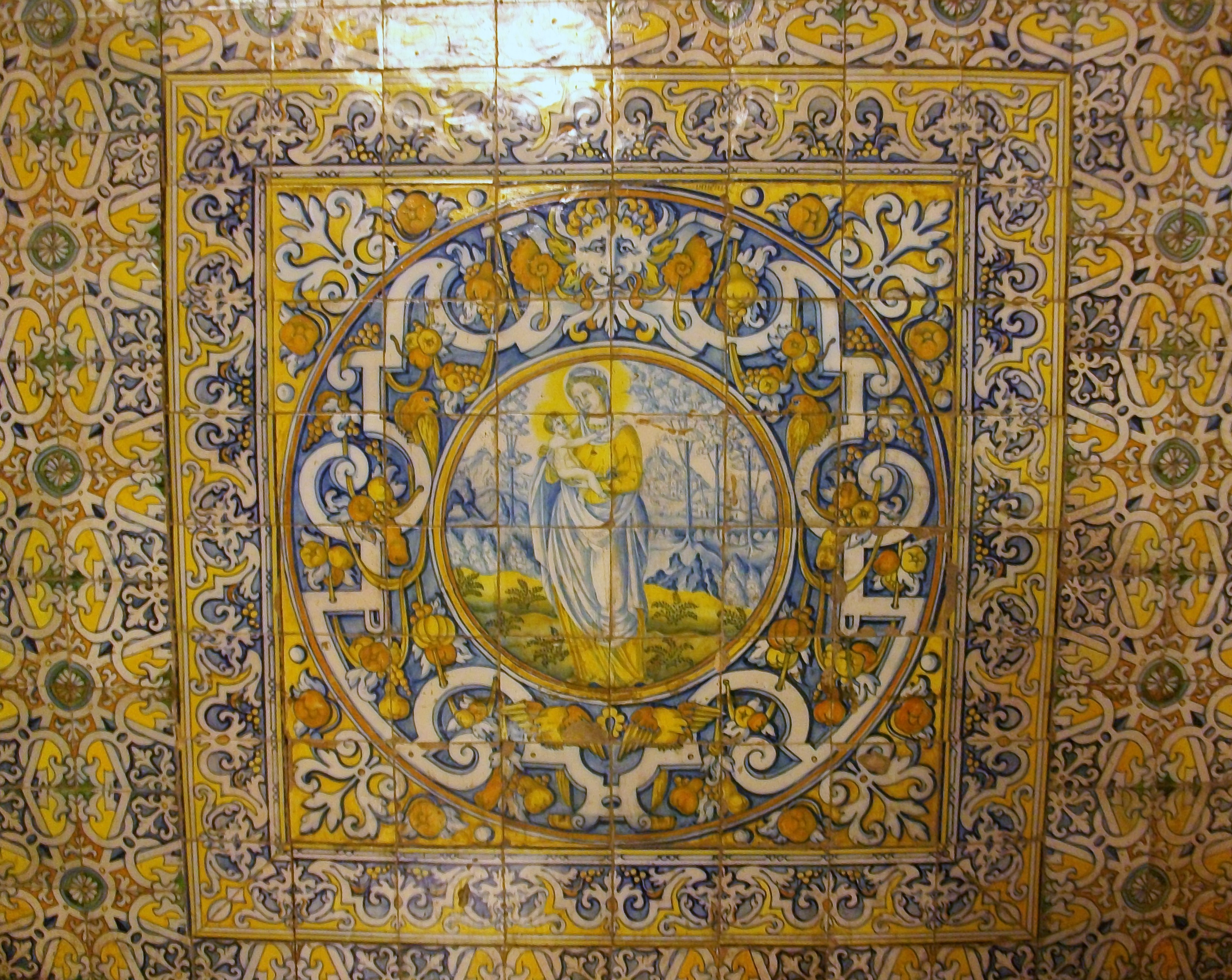
Azulejos made by Hernando de Santiago and Juan de Víllalba in 1575 in Sala Nova, Palau de la Generalitat Valenciana, Valencia.

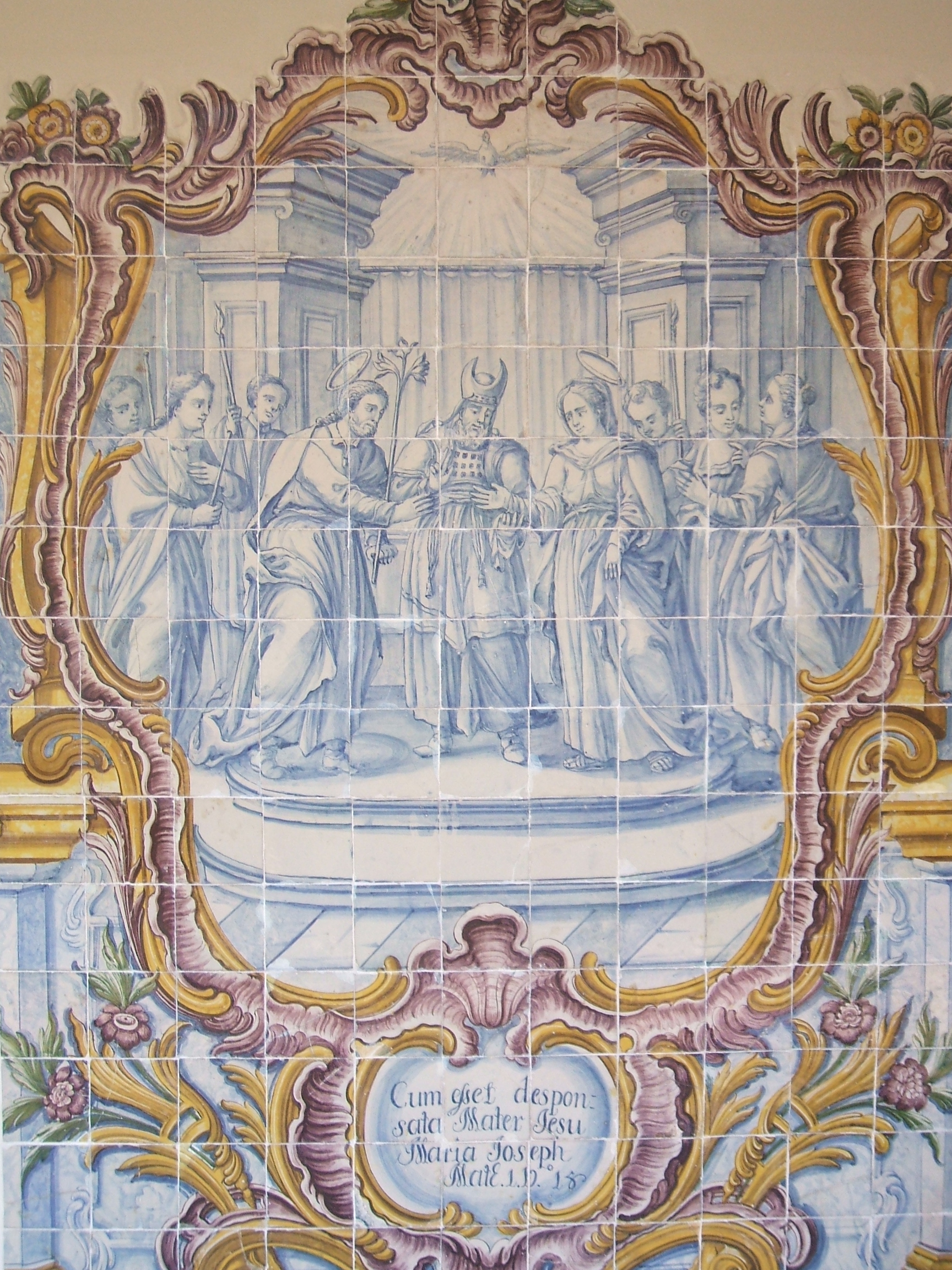
Azulejo of the Santa Cruz Hospital in Toledo, Spain.

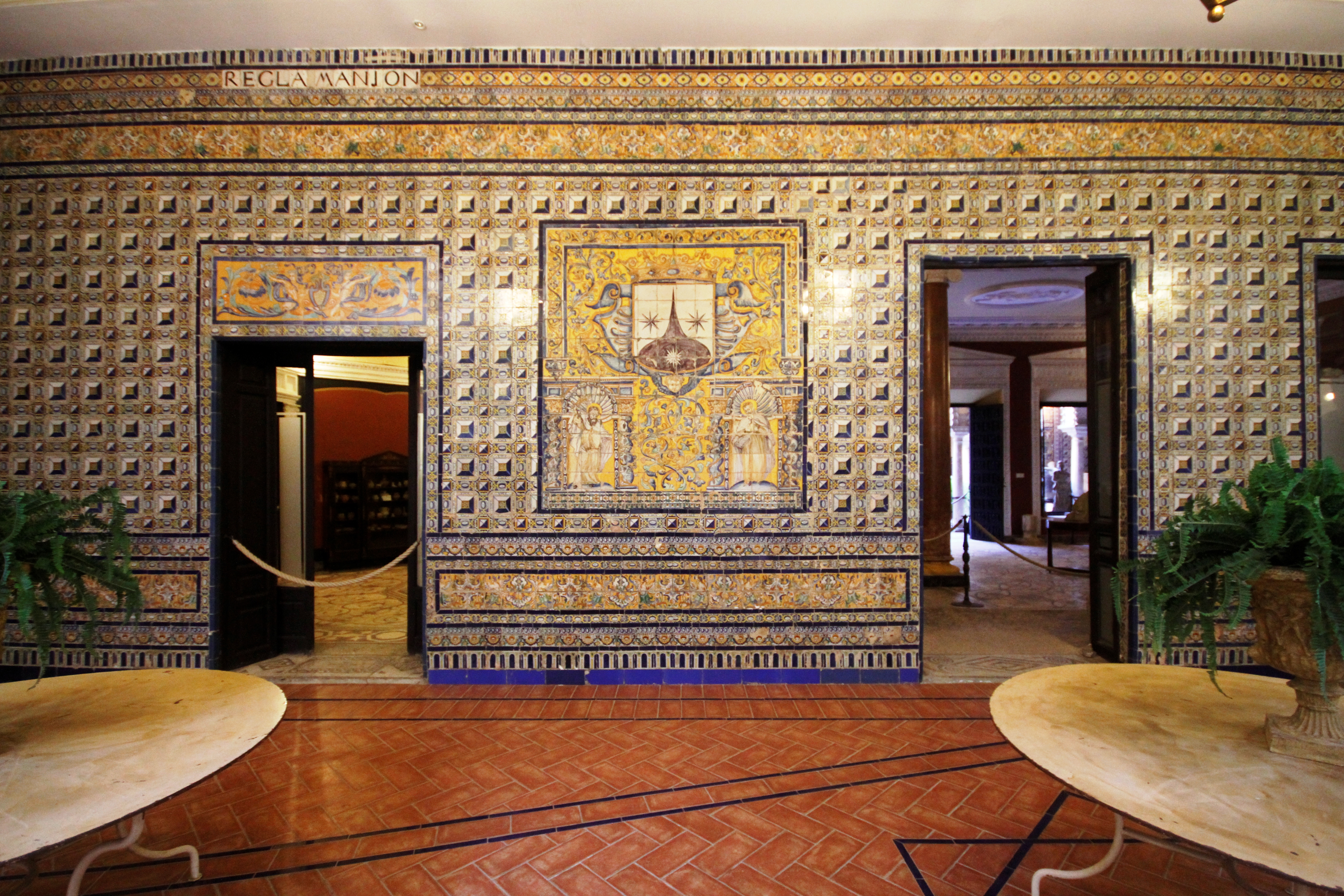
Azulejos of the Palacio de la Condesa de Lebrija (ca. 1585), Seville

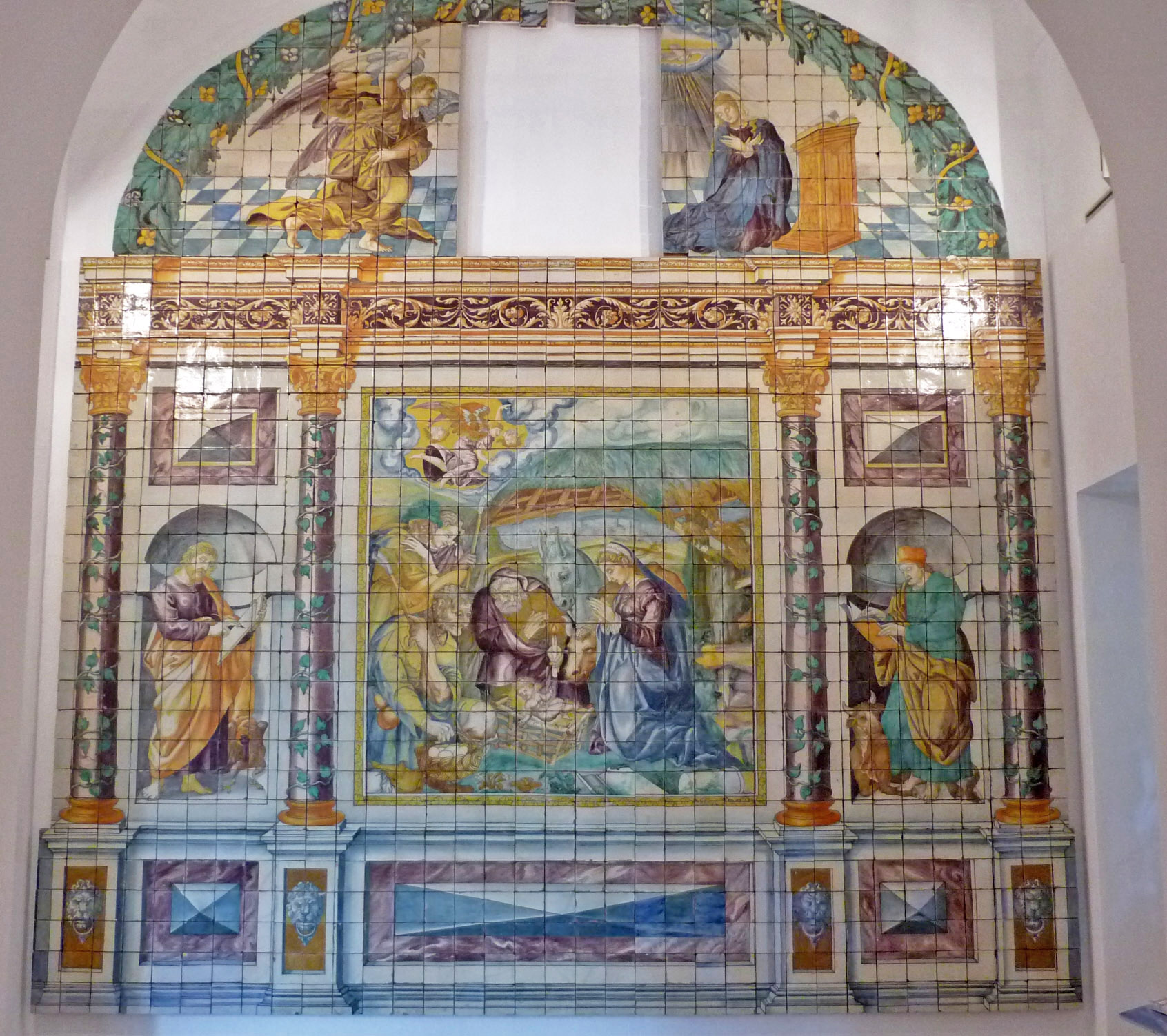
Altarpiece of Our Lady of Life, painted in 1580 by Marçal de Matos, National Museum of the Azulejo, Lisbon.

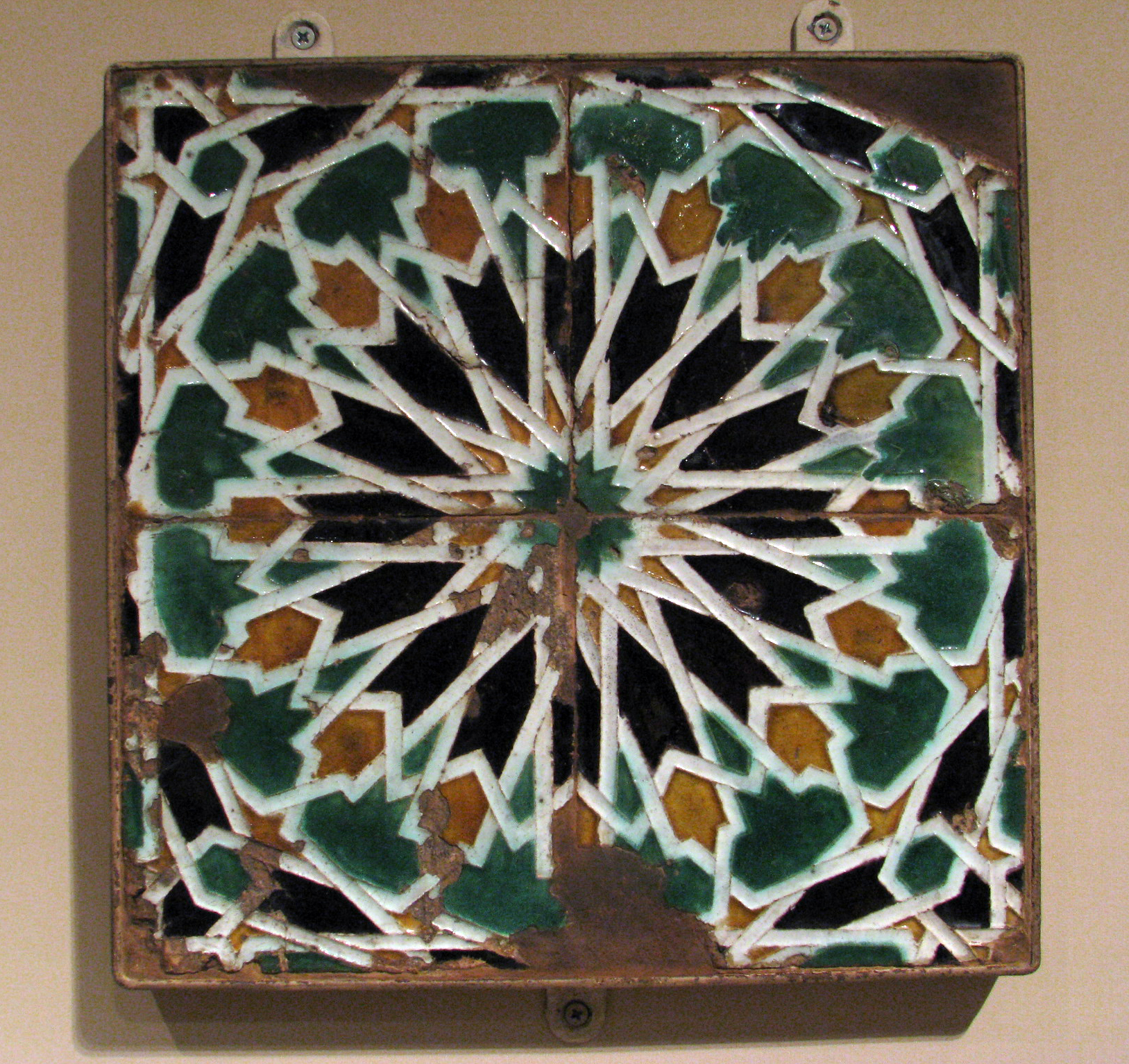
Cuenca tile with traditional geometric motif, at the Metropolitan Museum of Art, from 16th-century Spain

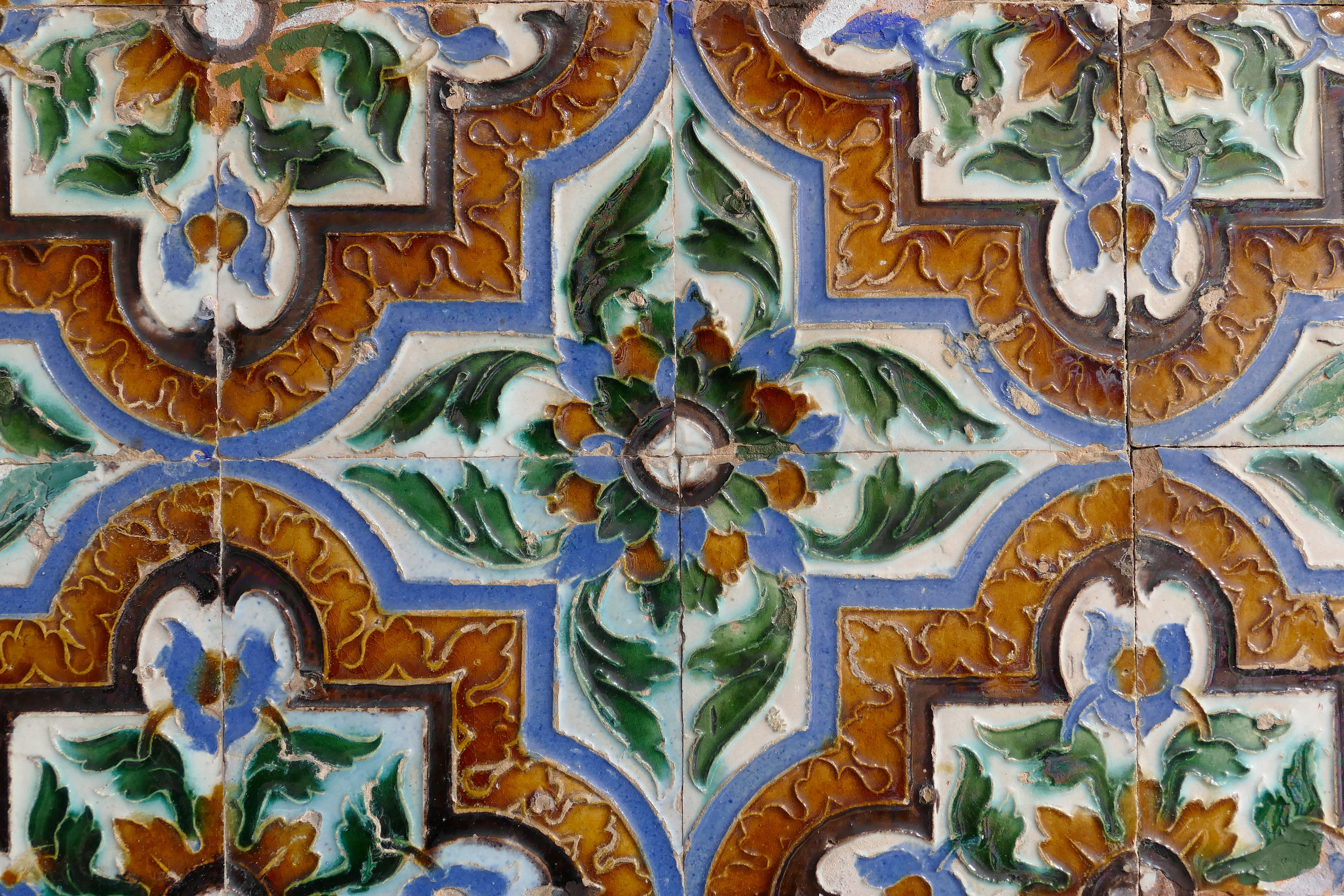
Cuenca tile, with newer motifs, in the Casa de Pilatos in Seville (16th century)

=== 17th century ===
Shortly afterwards, these plain white tiles were replaced by polychrome tiles (enxaquetado rico) often giving a complex framework such as in the Igreja de Santa Maria de Marvila in Santarém, Portugal.

When the diagonal tiles were replaced by a repetitive pattern of horizontal polychrome tiles, one could obtain a new design with different motifs, interlacing Mannerist drawings with representations of roses and camellias (sometimes roses and garlands). An inset votive usually depicts a scene from the life of Christ or a saint. These carpet compositions (azulejo de tapete), as they were called, elaborately framed with friezes and borders, were produced in great numbers during the 17th century. The best examples are to be found in the Igreja do Salvador, Évora, Igreja de S. Quintino, Obral de Monte Agraço, Igreja de S. Vicente, Cuba (Portugal) and the university chapel in Coimbra.

The use of azulejos for the decoration of antependia (front of an altar), imitating precious altar cloths, is typical for Portugal. The panel may be in one piece, or composed of two or three sections. They were used in the 16th, 17th and 18th centuries. Some antependia of the 17th century imitate oriental fabrics (calico, chintz). The golden fringes of the altar cloth were imitated by yellow motifs on the painted border tiles. Excellent examples can be found in the Hospital de Santa Marta, Lisbon, or in the Convent of Santa Maria de Almoster and the Convento de Santa Cruz do Buçaco.

During the same period another motif in friezes was introduced: floral vases flanked by birds, dolphins or putti, the so-called albarradas. They were probably inspired by Flemish paintings of flower vases, such as by Jan Brueghel the Elder. These were still free-standing in the 17th century, but they would be used in repetitive modules in the 18th century. Azulejos located in the Royal Monastery of the Descalzas Reales depicted various virtues and aspects of women of royal descent. These tiles are singular in nature, but reflect a marked shift—during the late 16th and early 17th centuries—away from geometric patterns to an emphasis on religious and colloquial depictions.

Azulejos dating from 1642 are in the Basilica and Convent de San Francisco de Lima, Peru. Azulejos in the Colegio Maximo de San Pedro contain numerous depictions of martyrs and prominent Catholic figures commissioned by Jesuit missionaries. These depictions served both devotional and symbolic purposes, and their inclusion was used to reinforce the Jesuit presence in Lima.

Another type of azulejo composition, called aves e ramagens ('birds and branches'), came into vogue between 1650 and 1680. They were influenced by the representations on printed textiles that were imported from India: Hindu symbols, flowers, animals and birds.

In the second half of the 17th century, the Spanish artist Gabriel del Barco y Minusca introduced into Portugal the blue-and-white tiles from Delft in the Netherlands. The workshops of Jan van Oort and Willem van der Kloet in Amsterdam created large tile panels with historical scenes for their rich Portuguese clients, such as for the Palace of the Marqueses da Fronteira in Benfica, Lisbon. But when King Peter II stopped all imports of azulejos between 1687 and 1698, the workshop of Gabriel del Barco took over the production. The last major production from Holland was delivered in 1715. Soon large, home-made blue-and-white figurative tiles, designed by academically trained Portuguese artists, became the dominant fashion, superseding the former taste for repeated patterns and abstract decoration.

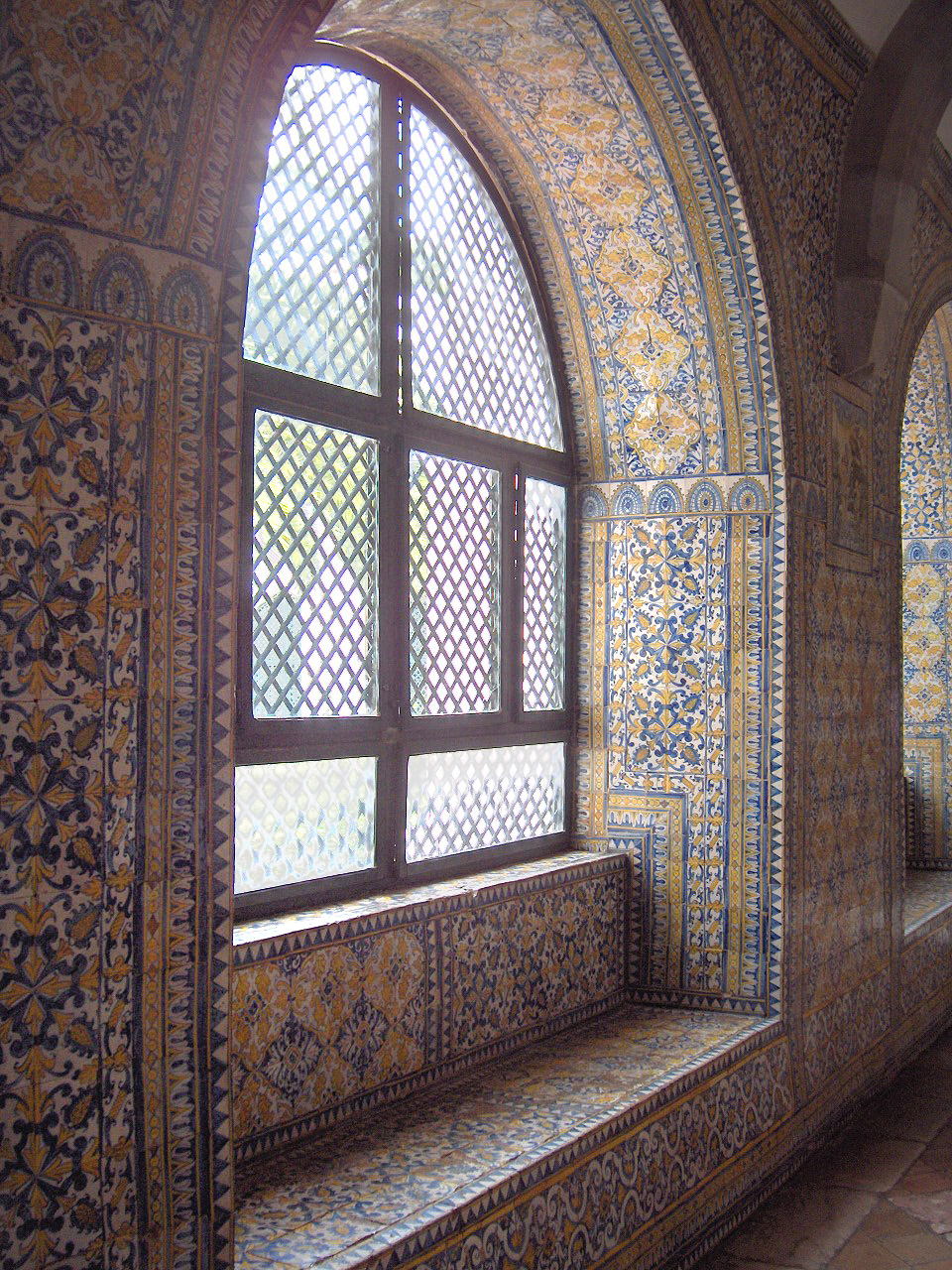
Carpet-style decoration
Museu da Rainha D. Leonor; Beja, Portugal

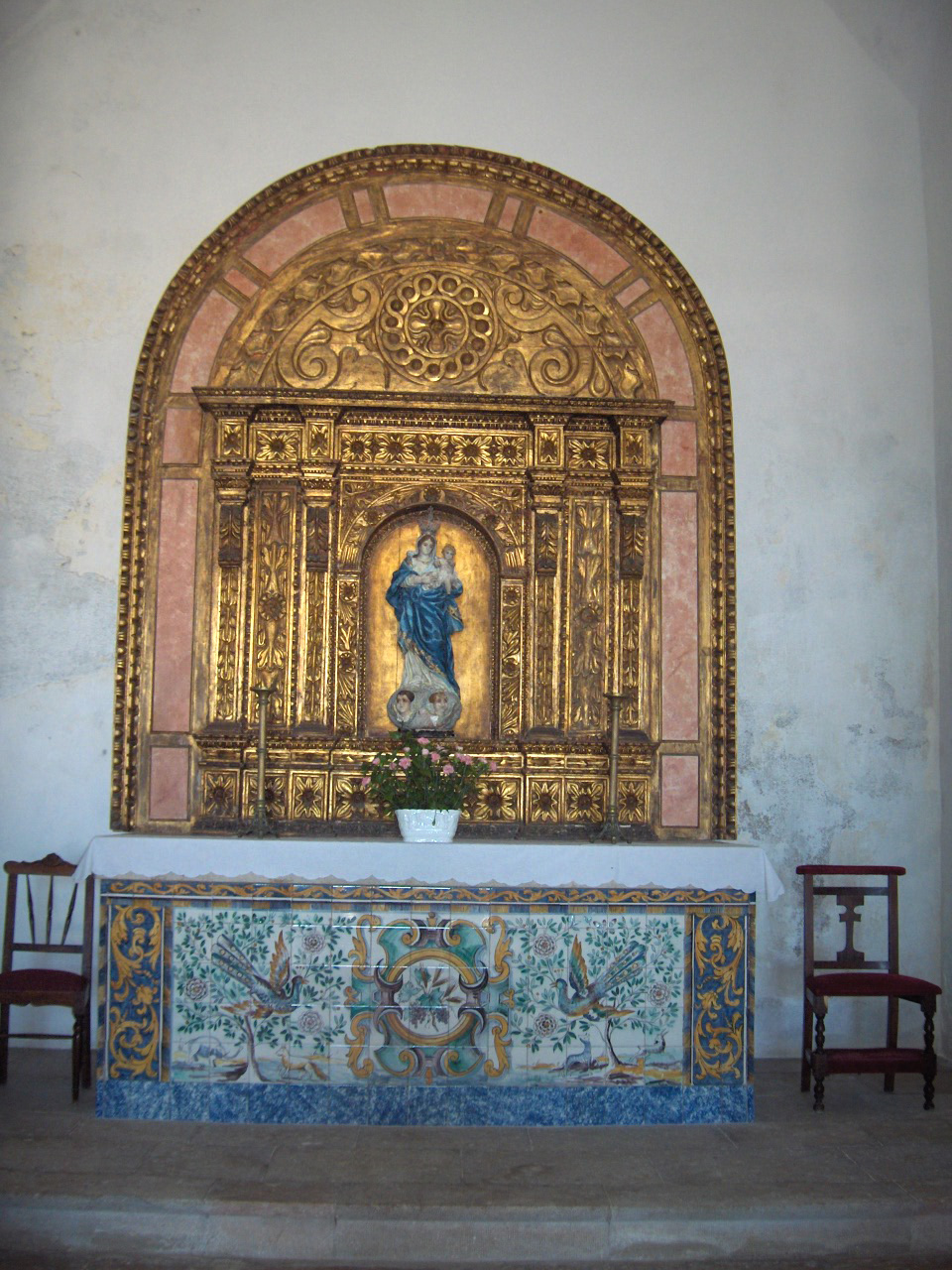
Antependium decorated with azulejos
Church of Nossa Senhora da Graça; Sagres, Portugal

Kings Gallery fountain, Palace of the Marquess of Fronteira, Lisbon, Portugal

Palace of the Marquess of Fronteira, Lisbon.

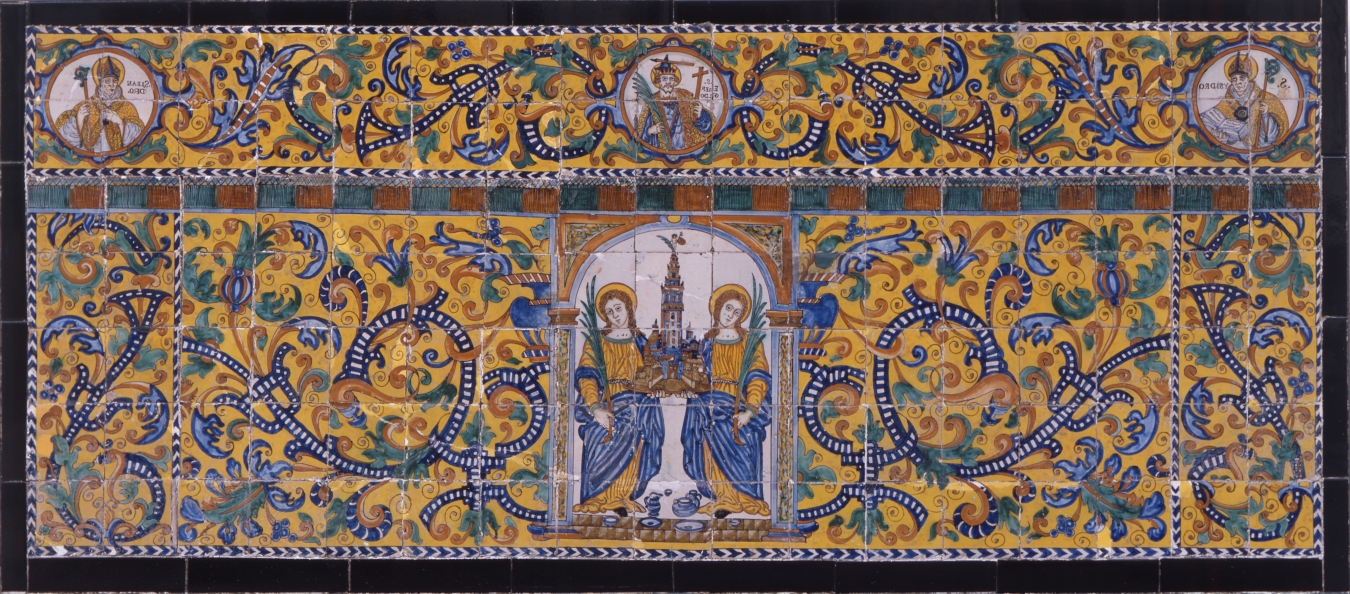
Saints Justa and Rufina, c. 1600, Museum of Fine Arts of Seville

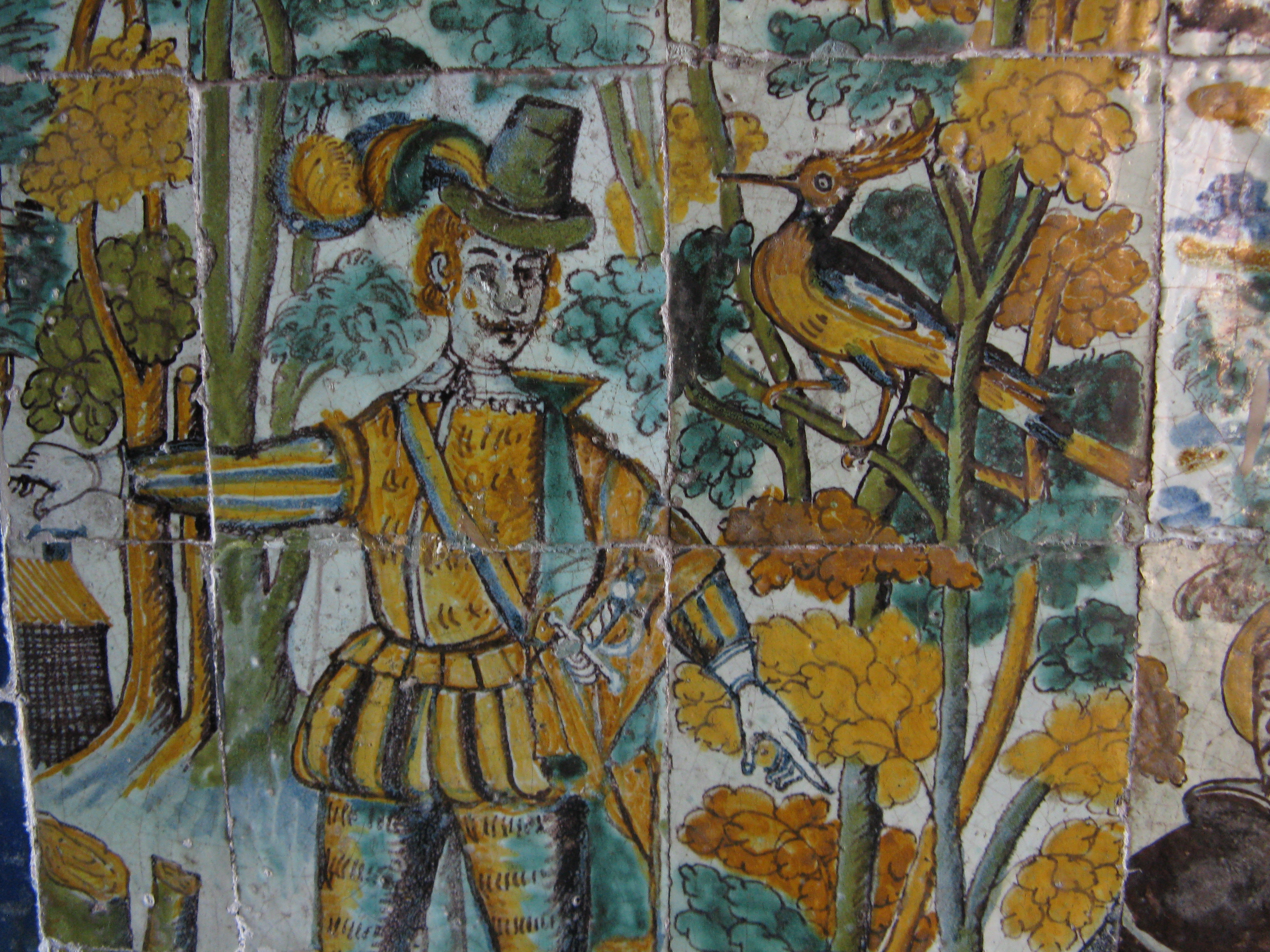
Detail of the azulejos (ca. 1606) at the Basilica of Santo Domingo, Lima, Peru

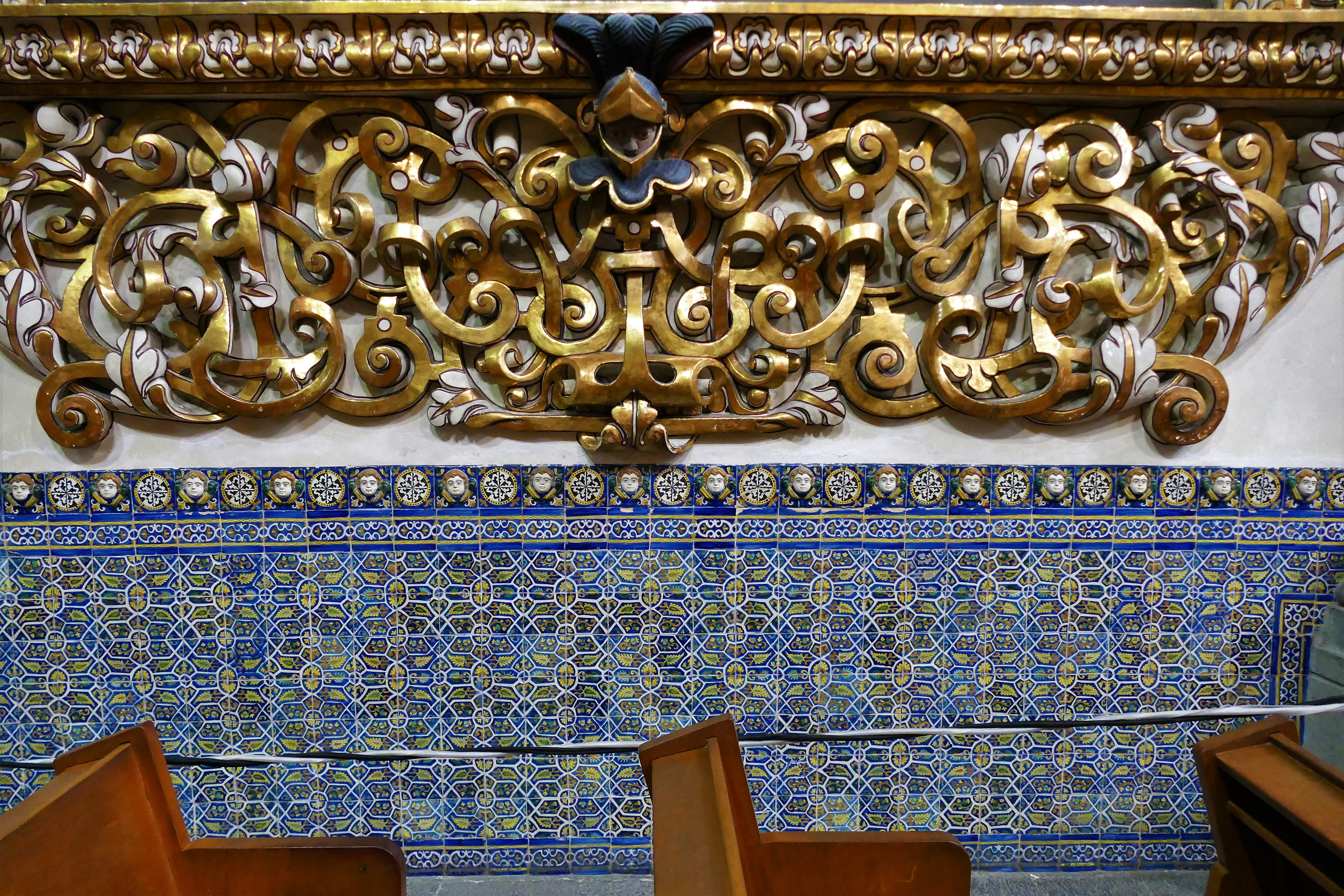
Azulejos inside the Chapel of the Rosario (1531-1690), Puebla City, Mexico

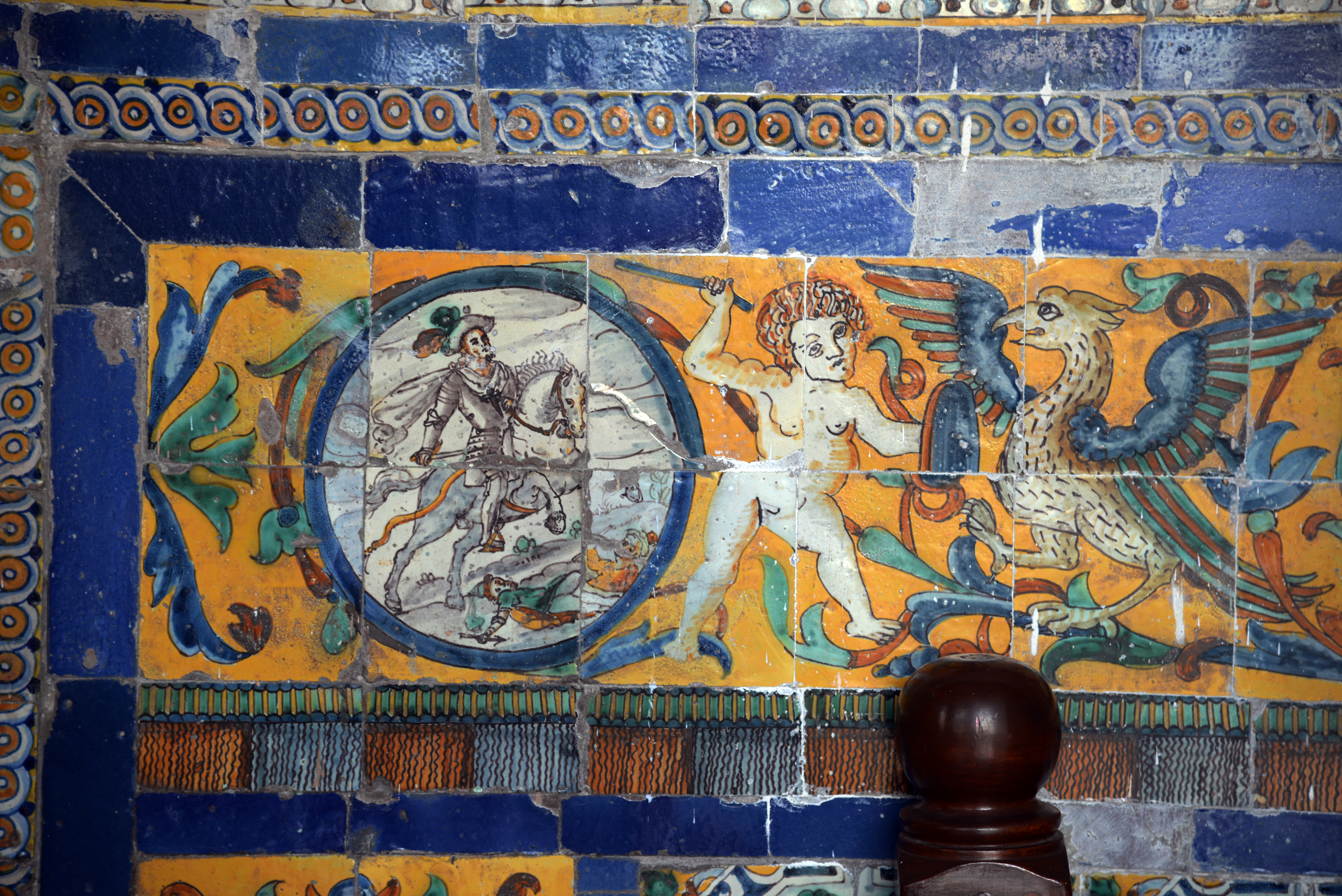
Azulejos (dating to 1642) in the Basilica of San Francisco, Lima, Peru.

=== 18th century ===
The late 17th and early 18th centuries became the 'Golden Age of the Azulejo', the so-called Cycle of the Masters (Ciclo dos Mestres). Mass production was started not just because of a greater internal demand, but also because of large orders came in from the Portuguese colony of Brazil. Large one-off orders were replaced by the less expensive use of repetitive tile patterns. Churches, monasteries, palaces and even houses were covered inside and outside with azulejos, many with exuberant Baroque elements.

The most prominent master-designers in these early years of the 18th century were: António Pereira (artist), Manuel dos Santos, the workshop of António de Oliveira Bernardes and his son Policarpo de Oliveira Bernardes; the Master PMP (only known by his monogram) and his collaborators Teotónio dos Santos and Valentim de Almeida; Bartolomeu Antunes and his pupil Nicolau de Freitas. As their production coincided with the reign of King João V (1706–1750), the style of this period is also called the Joanine style.

During this same period appear the first 'invitation figures' (figura de convite), invented by the Master PMP and produced in the 18th and 19th centuries. These are cut-out panels of azulejos with life-size figures (footmen, halberdiers, noblemen or elegantly dressed ladies), usually placed in entrances of palaces (see Palácio da Mitra), patios and stair landings. Their purpose was to welcome visitors. They can only be found in Portugal.

In the 1740s the taste of Portuguese society changed from the monumental narrative panels to smaller and more delicately executed panels in Rococo style. These panels depict gallant and pastoral themes as they occur in the works of the French painter Antoine Watteau. Fine examples are the façade and the gardens of the Palace of the Dukes de Mesquitela in Carnide (Lisbon) and the Corredor das Mangas in the Queluz National Palace. The mass-produced tiles acquired a more stereotypic design with predominant polychrome irregular shell motifs.

François Lemoyne, another prominent Rococo artist, influenced the trends azulejo followed at this time as well. His recently rediscovered work, the Annunciation, has been credited by researchers as a significant exemplar for 18th century azulejo works in Portugal and Brazil. The original work was copied by Laurent Cars and proliferated through Portugal and its colonies. Lemoyne's work has been reproduced through azulejo in numerous Portuguese churches. The work depicts the annunciation of Mary by Gabriel the archangel and one such example exists in the Church of Nossa Senhora da Luz.

The reconstruction of Lisbon after the great earthquake of 1755 gave rise to a more utilitarian role for decoration with azulejos. This bare and functional style would become known as the Pombaline style, named after the Marquis of Pombal, who was put in charge of rebuilding the country. Small devotional azulejo panels started to appear on buildings as protection against future disasters.

In Mexico, the production of Talavera, a regional form of maiolica, developed from azulejo techniques introduced in the early 16th century. Azulejos were widely utilized in religious and domestic applications at this time, and The Casa de los Azulejos—constructed in 1737 for the Count and Countess of El Valle de Orizaba—in Mexico City is one such example.

As a reaction, simpler and more delicate Neoclassical designs started to appear with more subdued colours. These themes were introduced in Portugal by the engravings of Robert and James Adams. The Real Fábrica de Louça do Rato, with the master-designer Sebastião Inácio de Almeida and the painter Francisco de Paula e Oliveira, became in this period an important manufacturer of the characteristic so-called Rato-tiles. Another important tile painter in this period was Francisco Jorge da Costa.

With great Portuguese influence, the city of São Luís, in Maranhão, in Brazil, preserves the largest urban agglomeration of azulejos from the 18th and 19th centuries, throughout Latin America. In 1997, the Historic Center of São Luís was declared a World Heritage Site by UNESCO. São Luís is also known as "Cidade dos Azulejos".

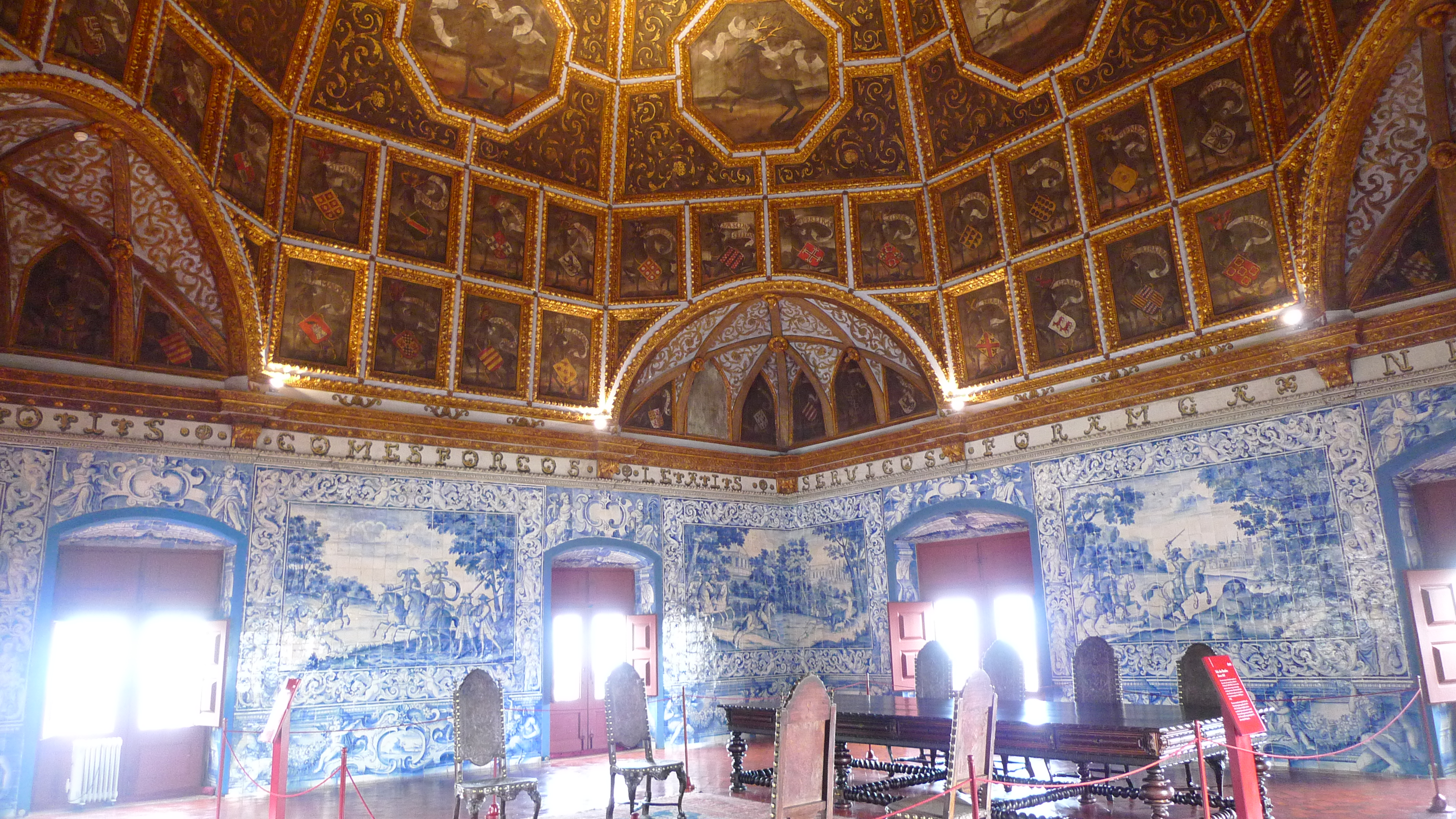
Azulejos of the walls of Sala dos Brasões (ca. 18th century), Sintra National Palace, Portugal

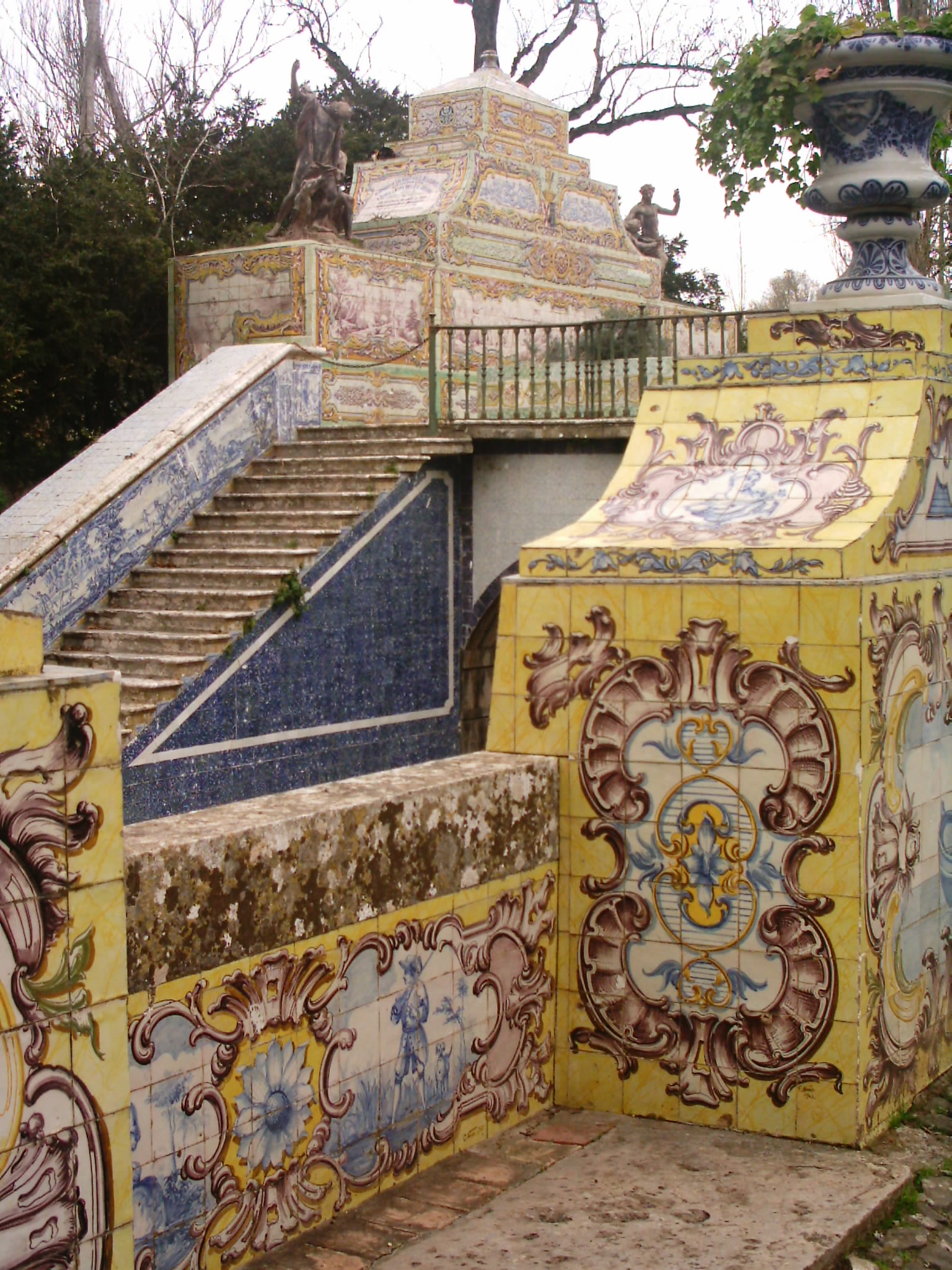
Azulejos in Rococo-style in the Palace of Queluz, Portugal.

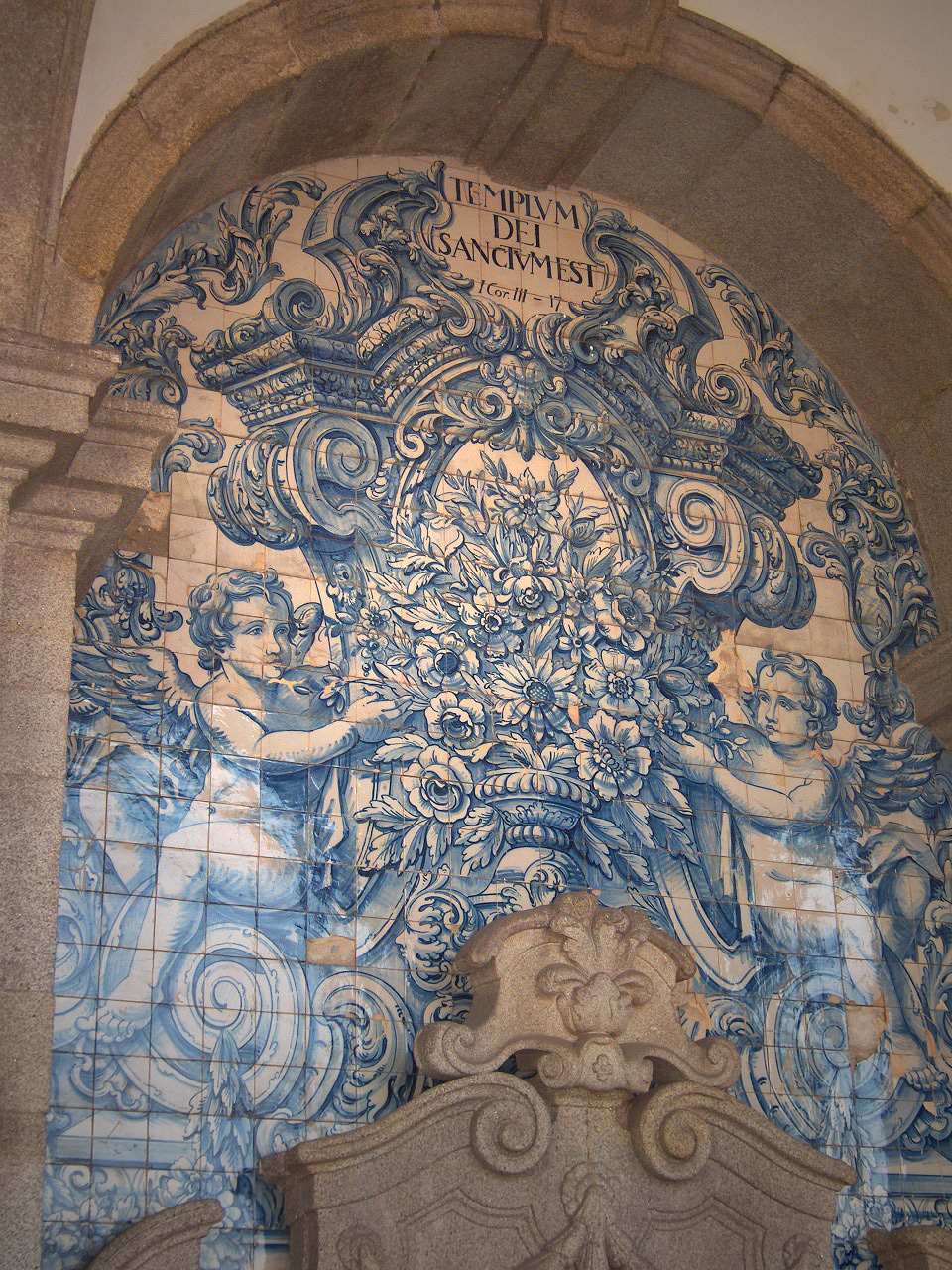
Albarrada, flower vase by Valentim de Almeida (between 1729 and 1731); Cathedral of Porto, Portugal.

Azulejos by Willem van der Kloet (1708) in the transept of the Church of Nossa Senhora da Nazaré; Nazaré, Portugal

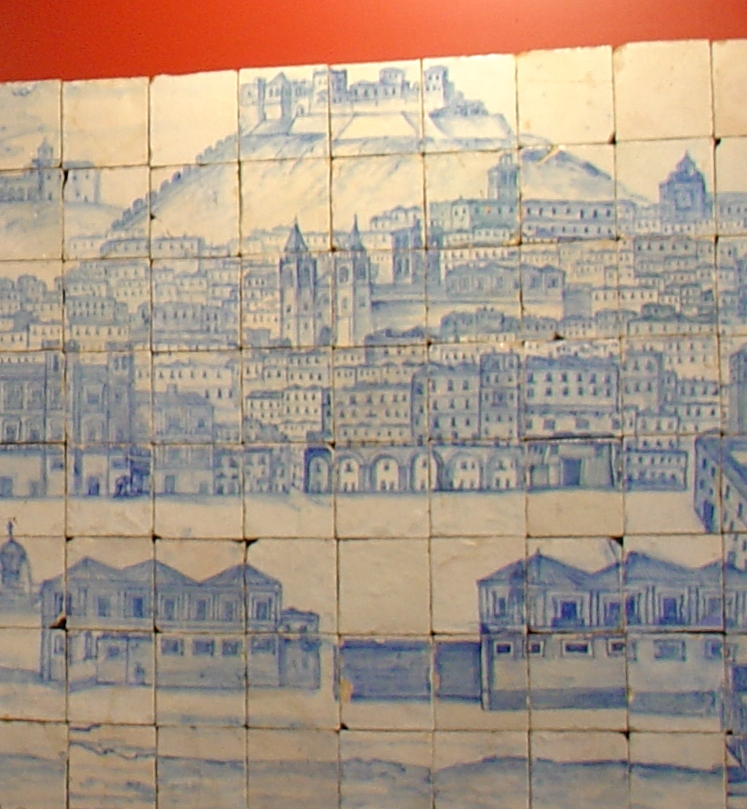
Azulejos of the Lisbon Cathedral, ca. 1755.

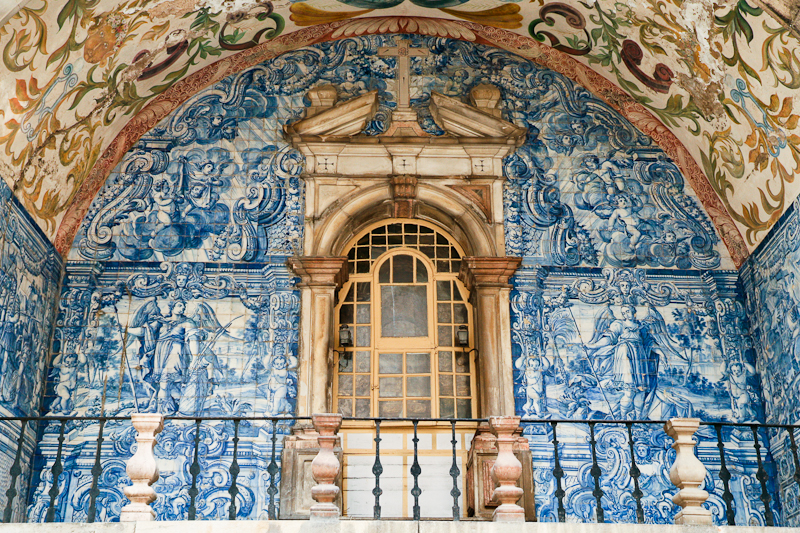
Azulejos vault in Óbidos, Portugal.

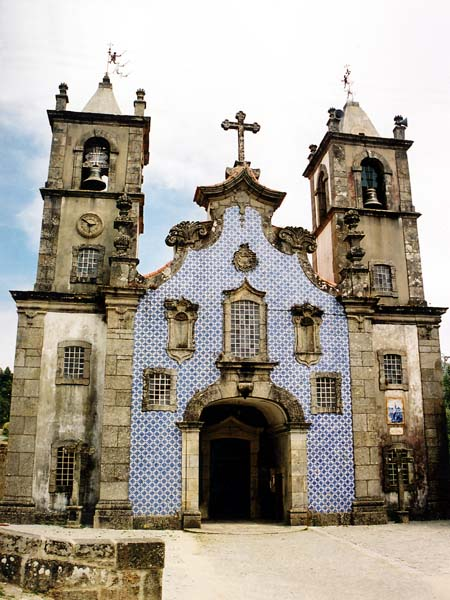
Checkered azulejos on the façade of the Igreja Matriz de Cambra, Vouzela, Portugal

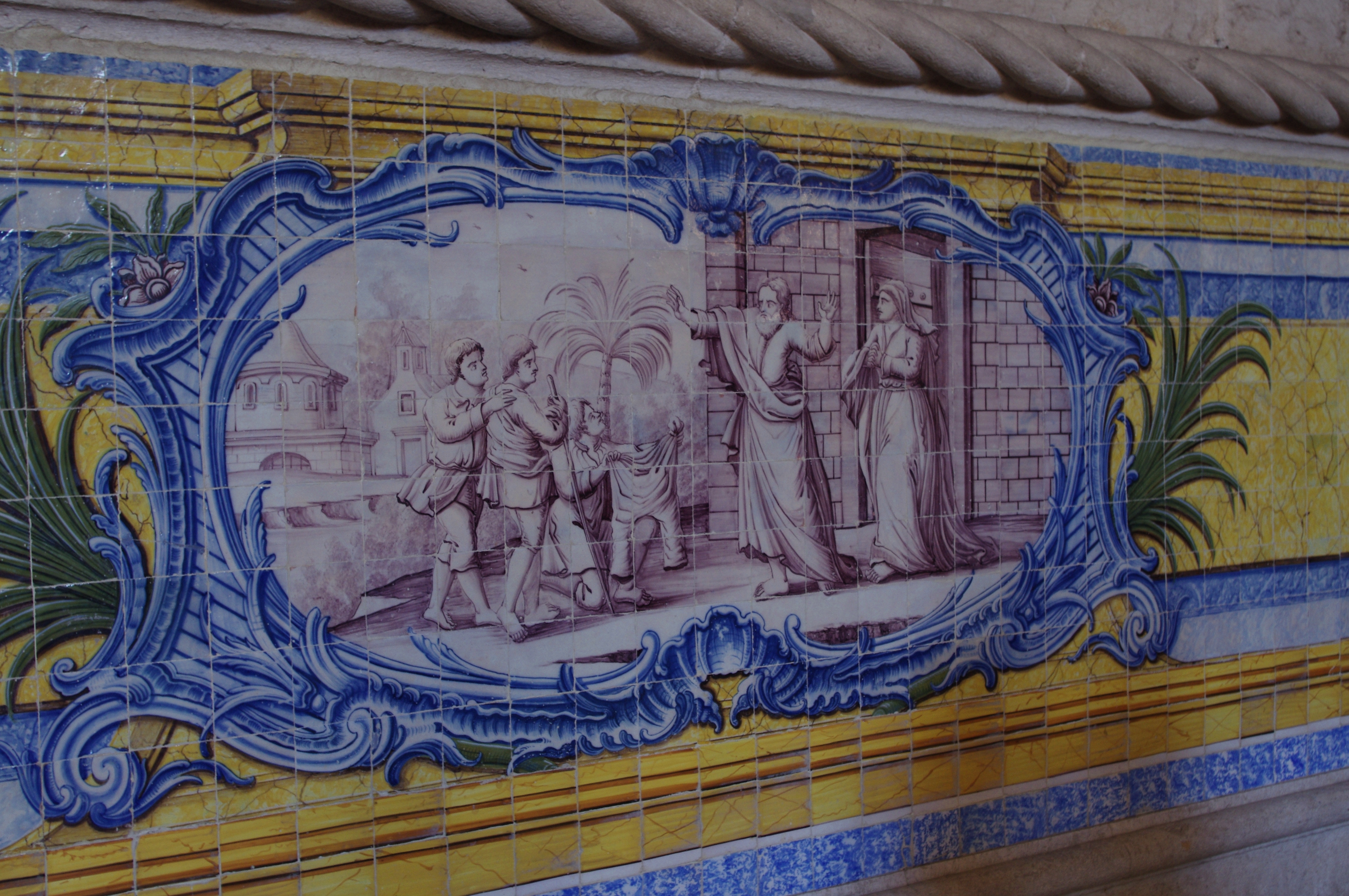
Azulejos (ca. 1785) of refrectory of Jerónimos Monastery, Lisbon

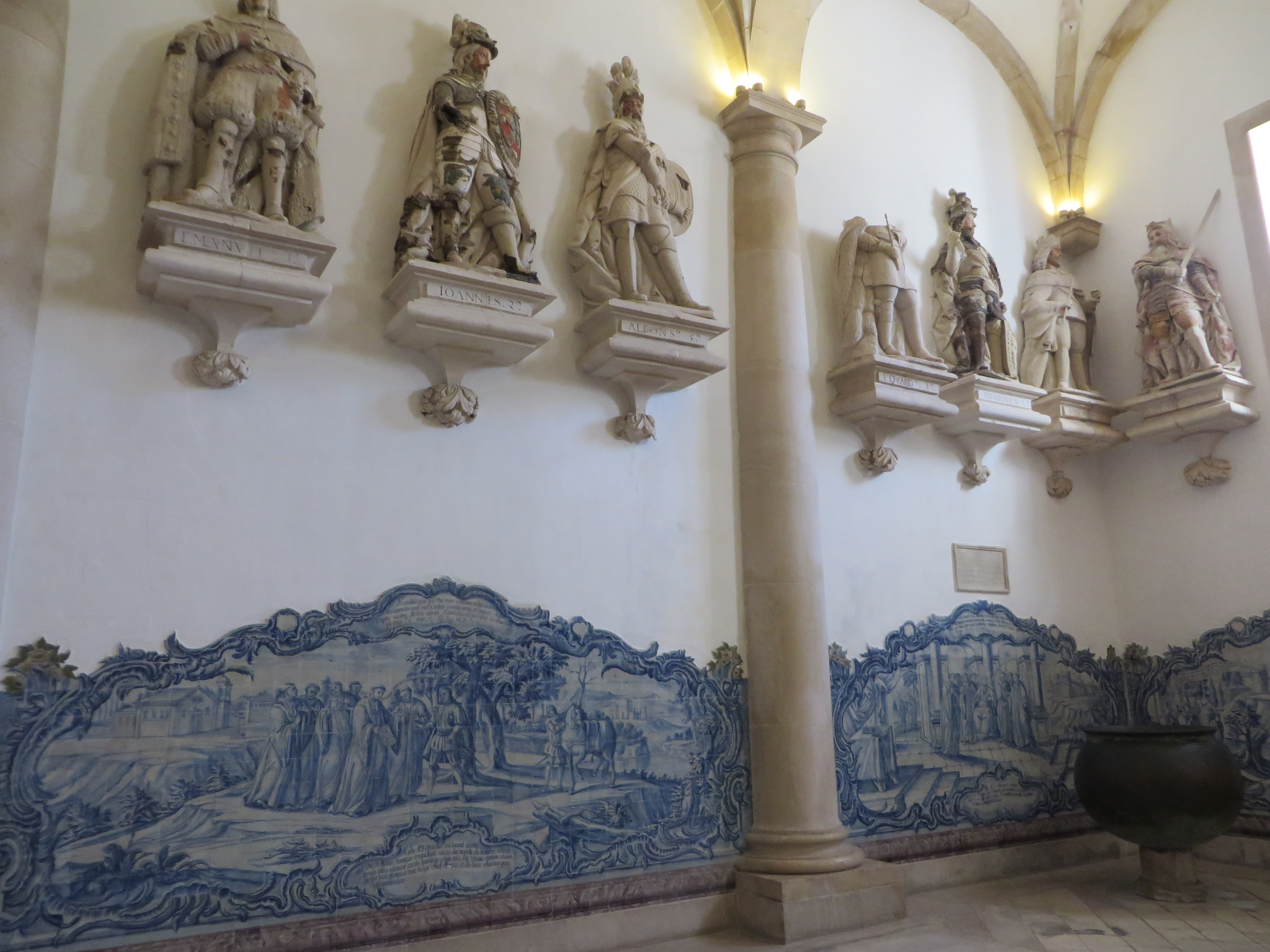
Azulejos (ca. 18th century) of the Alcobaça Monastery

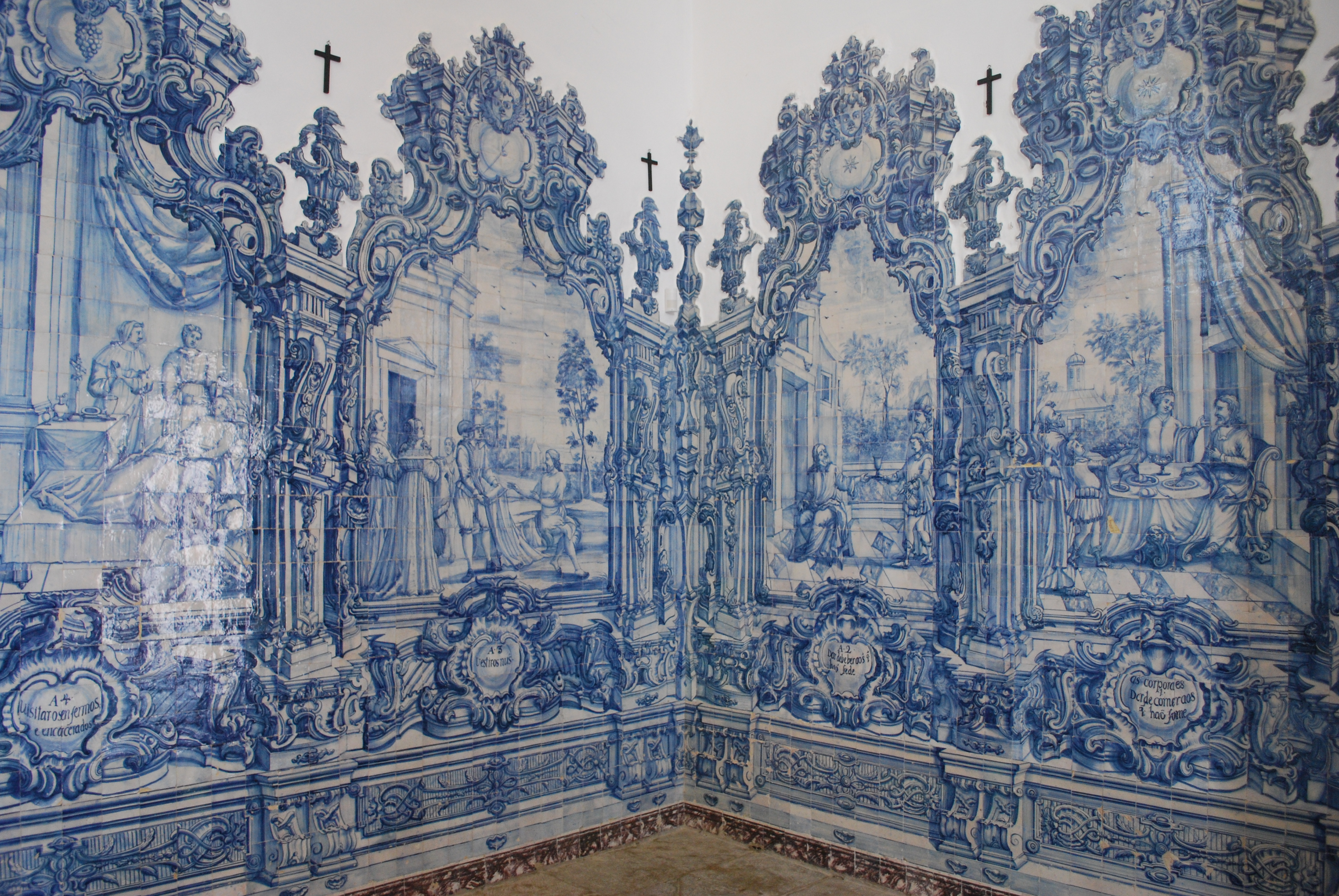
Azulejos (ca. 1760) of Igreja da Misericórdia, Tavira, Portugal

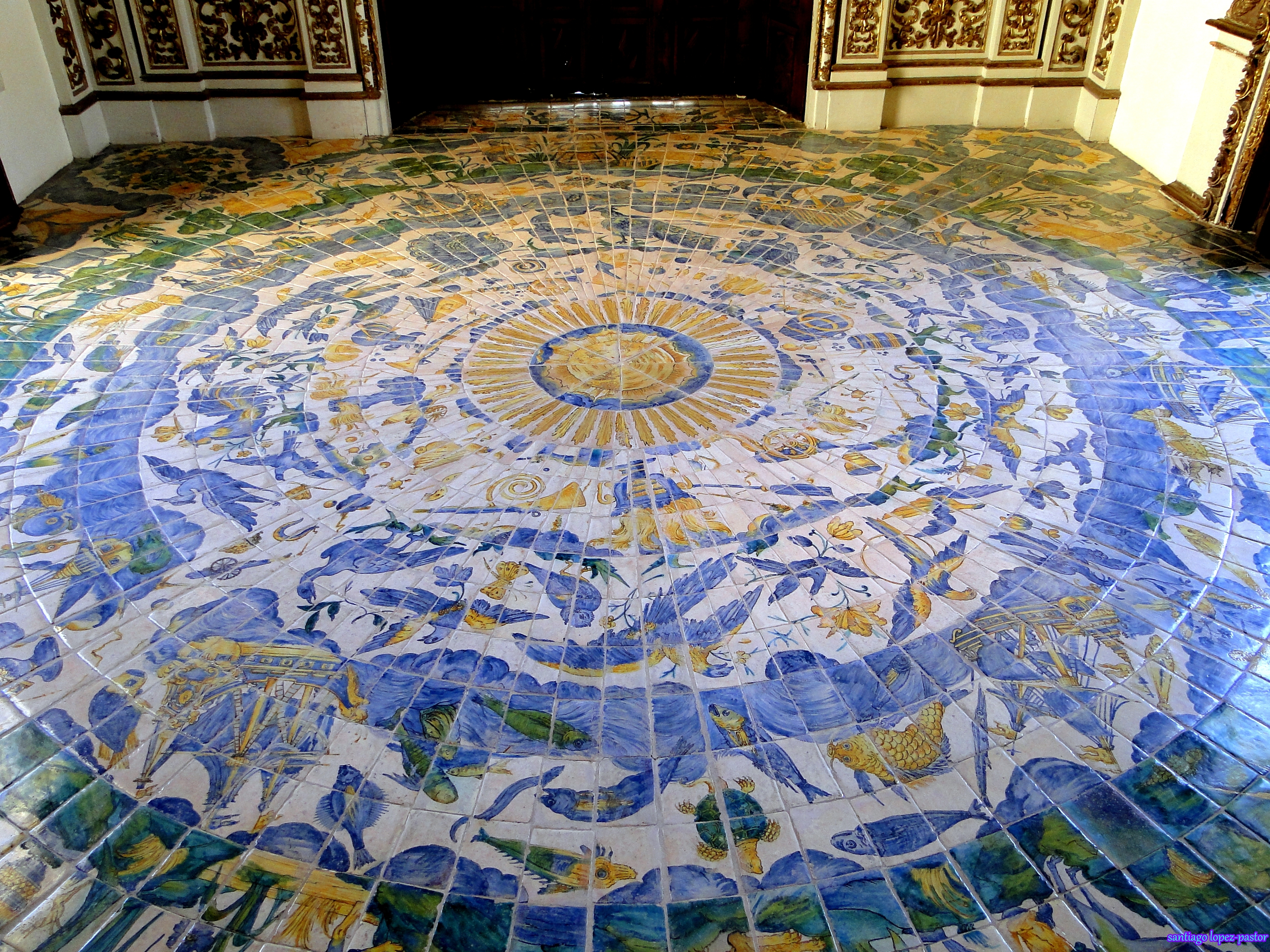
Galería Dorada (c. early-18th century), Ducal Palace of Gandia, Gandia, Spain

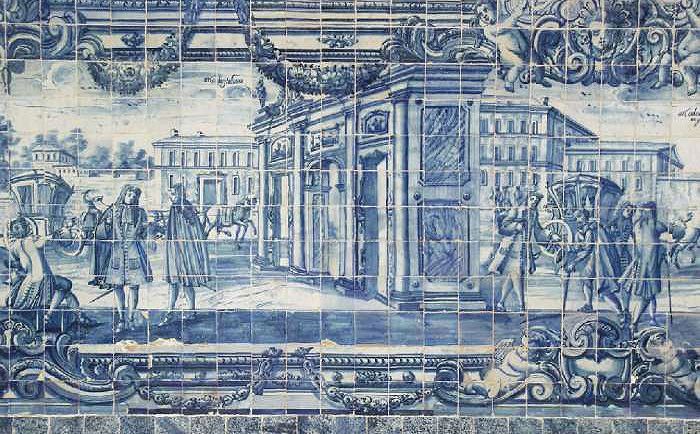
Convent of Saint-Francis, 1702, Salvador de Bahia, Brazil.

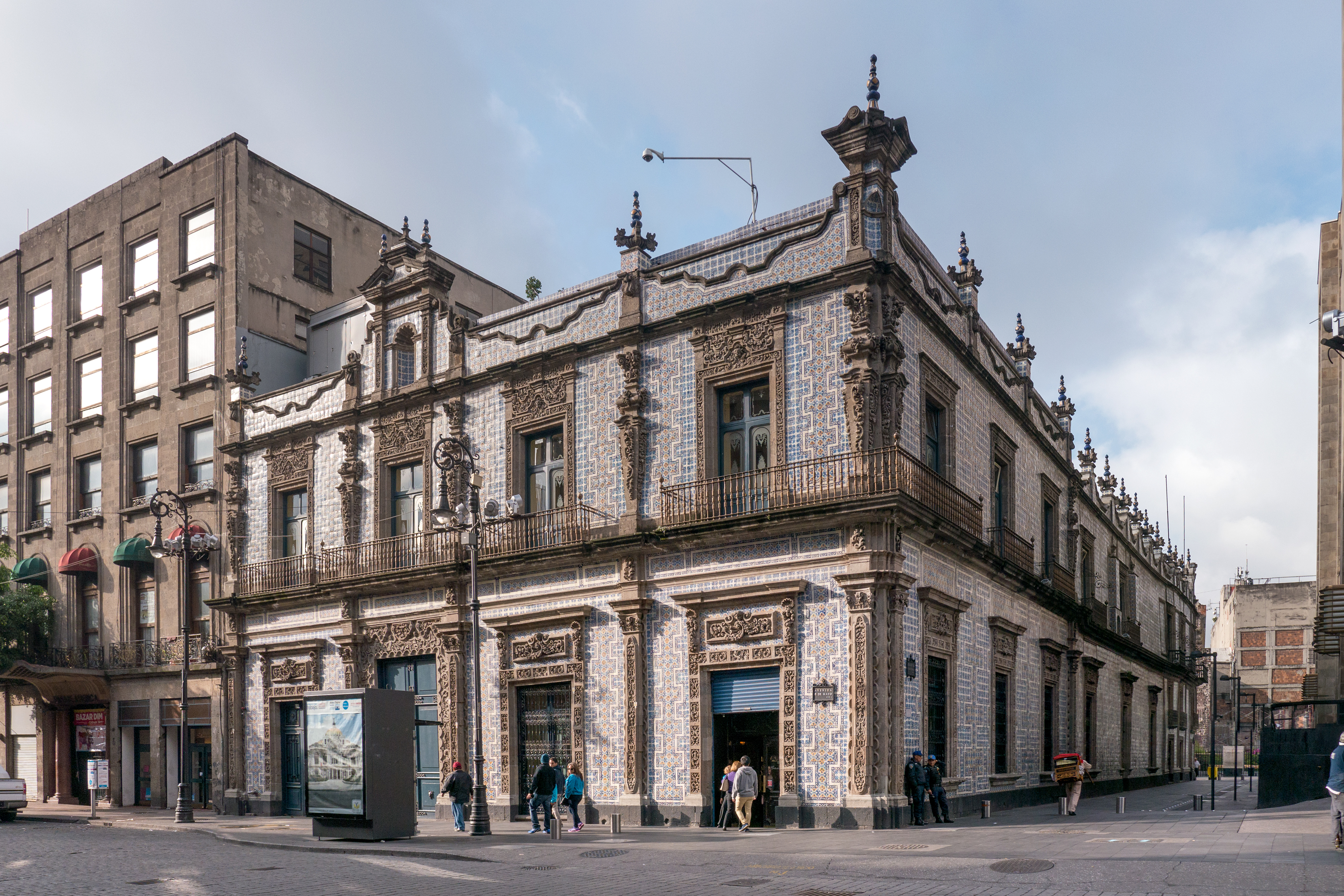
Casa de los Azulejos palace, ca. 1737, Mexico City, Mexico.

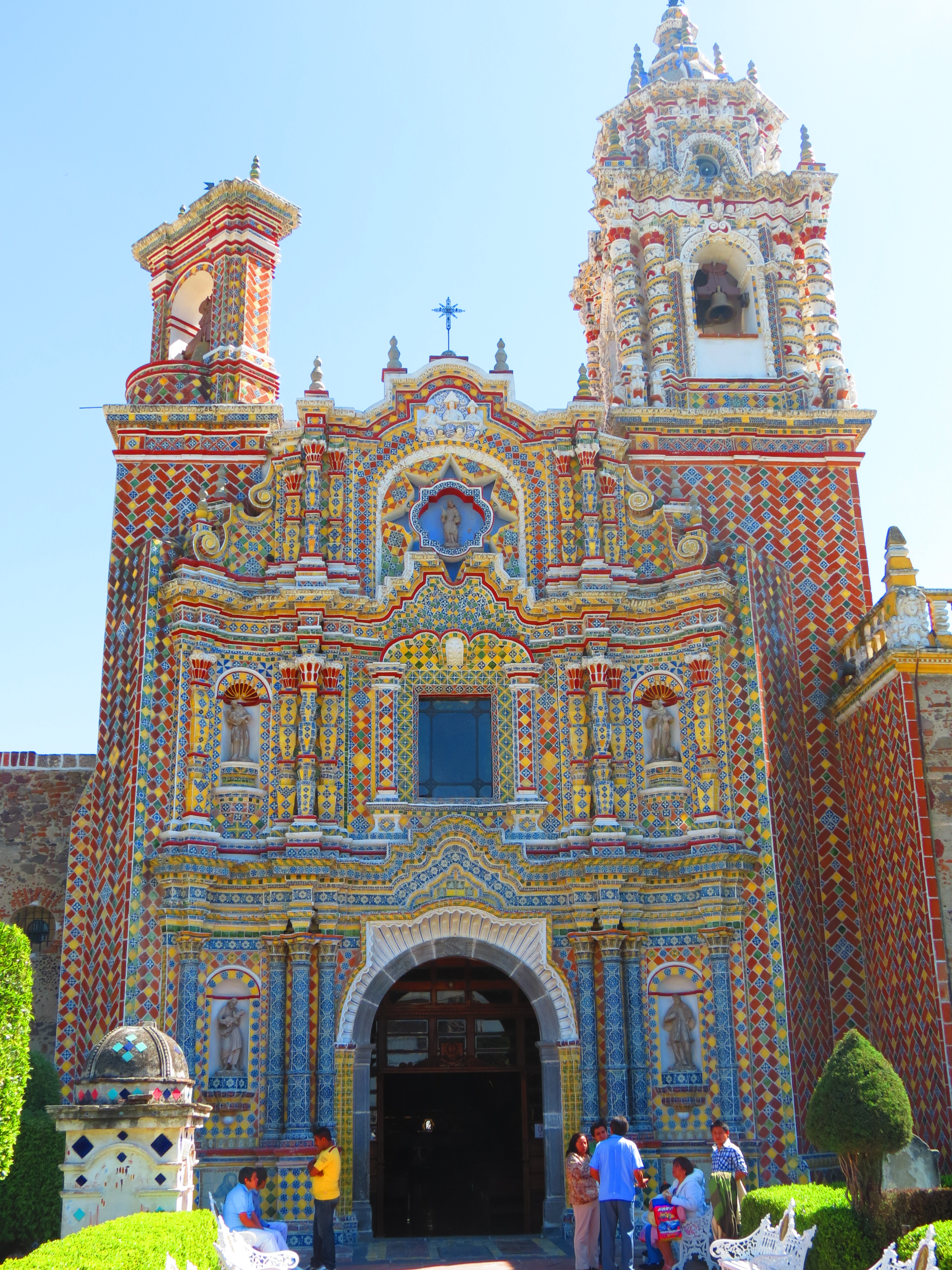
Azulejos of the facade made between 1650 and 1750 with Talavera pottery. Church of San Francisco Acatepec in San Andrés Cholula, Mexico.

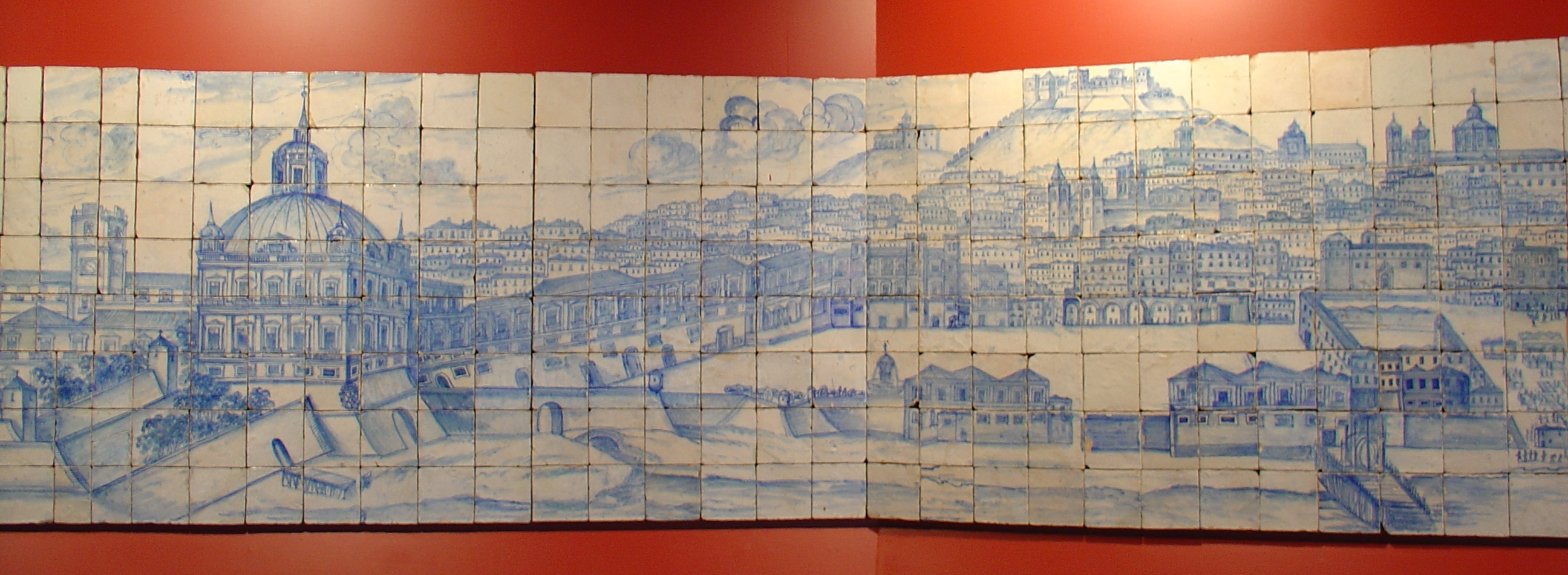
Large panel showing the Terreiro do Paço and Lisbon before the 1755 earthquake. ca. 18th century. National Museum of the Azulejo, Lisbon

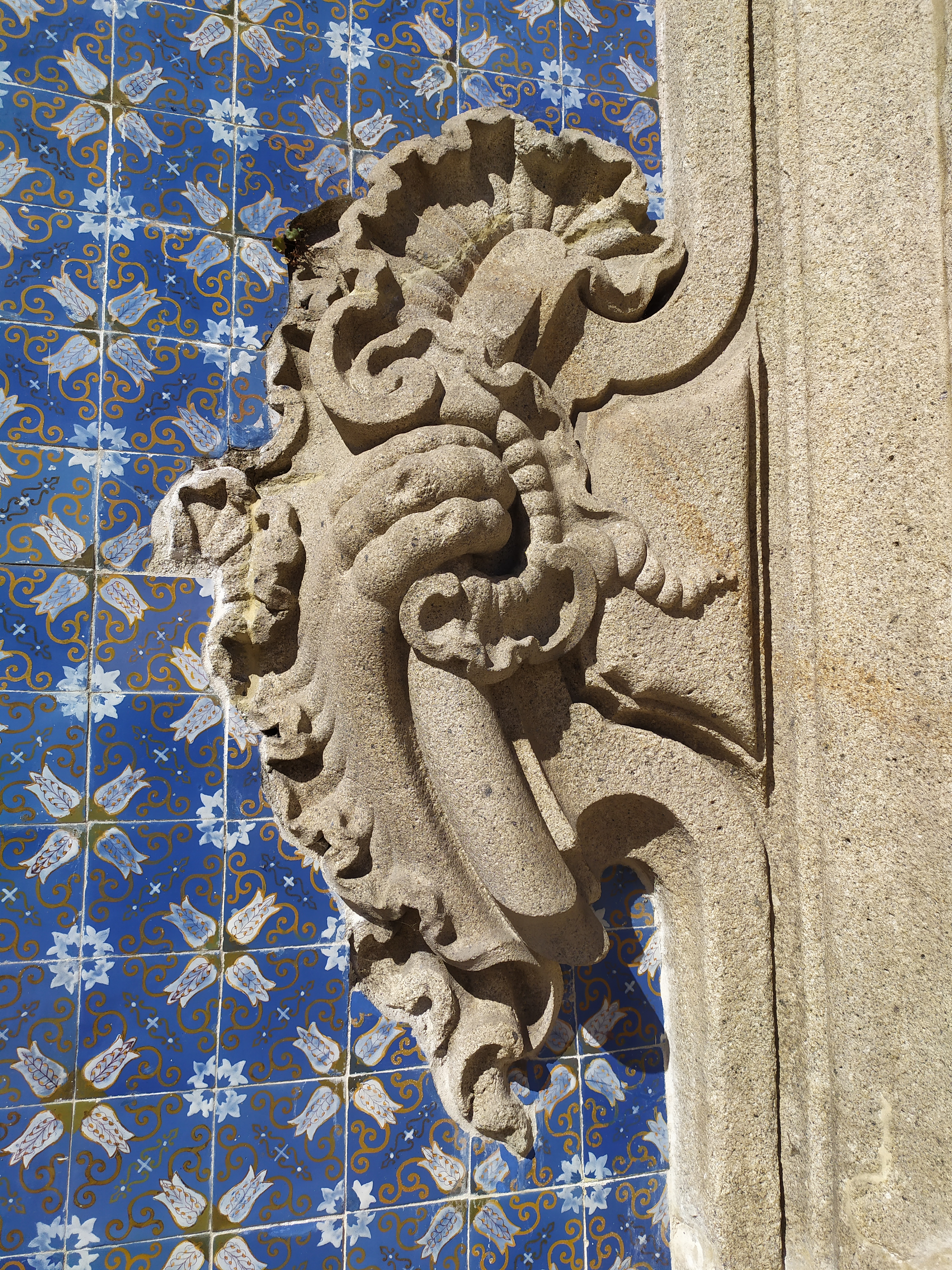
Palácio do Raio in Braga, Portugal

=== 19th century ===
In the first half of the 19th century, there was a stagnation in the production of decorative tiles, owing first to the incursion of the Napoleonic army and later to social and economic changes. When around 1840 immigrant Brazilians started an industrialized production in Porto, the Portuguese took over the Brazilian fashion of decorating the façades of their houses with azulejos. While these factories produces high-relief tiles in one or two colours, the Lisbon factories started using another method: the transfer-print method on blue-and-white or polychrome azulejos. In the last decades of the 19th century, the Lisbon factories started to use another type of transfer-printing: using creamware blanks.

While these industrialized methods produced simple, stylized designs, the art of hand-painting tiles was not dead, as applied by Manuel Joaquim de Jesus and especially Luís Ferreira. Luis Ferreira was the director of the Lisbon factory Viúva Lamego and covered the whole façade of this factory with allegorical scenes. He produced panels, known as Ferreira das Tabuletas, with flower vases, trees, and allegorical figures, applying the trompe-l'œil technique. These hand-painted panels are fine examples of the eclectic Romantic culture of the late 19th century.

Mid-19th century, in England, in addition to encaustic tiles and mosaics, the Mintons factory also produced azulejos.

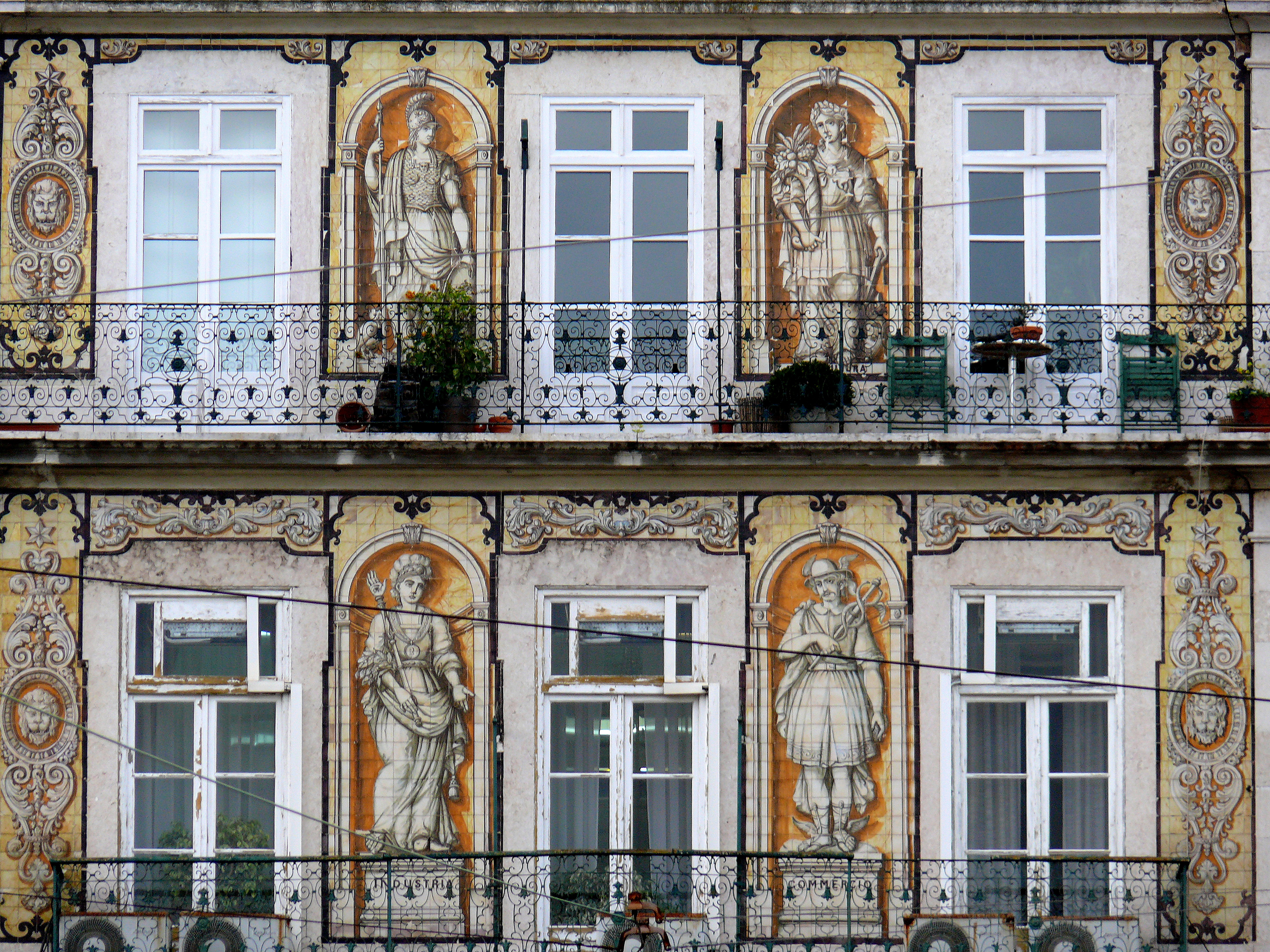
Casa do Ferreira das Tabuletas, in Rua da Trindade, Lisbon, building built between 1849 and 1865 with its respective trompe-l'œil azulejos in the facade.

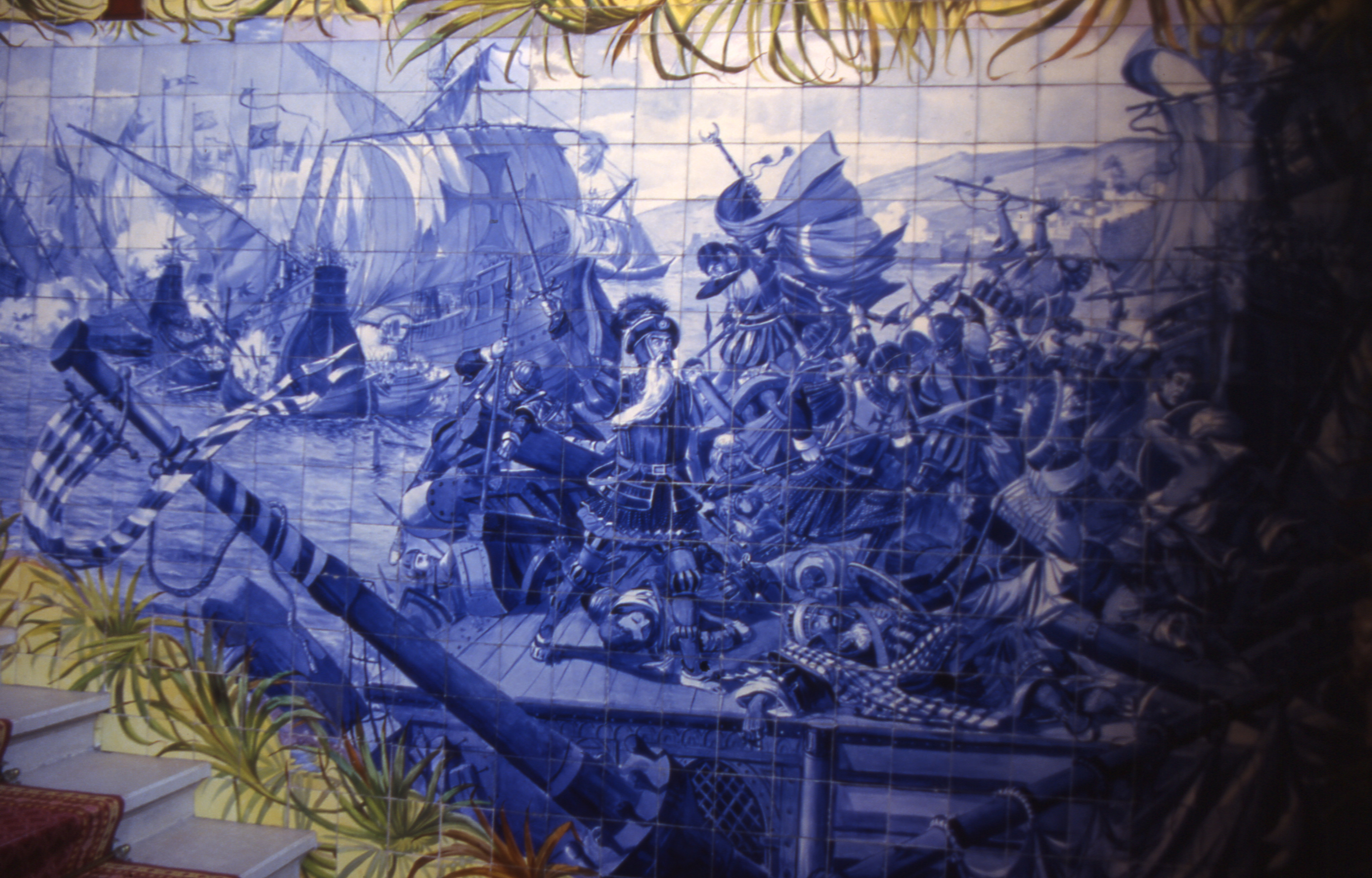
Azulejos at Buçaco Palace, in Mealhada, Portugal.

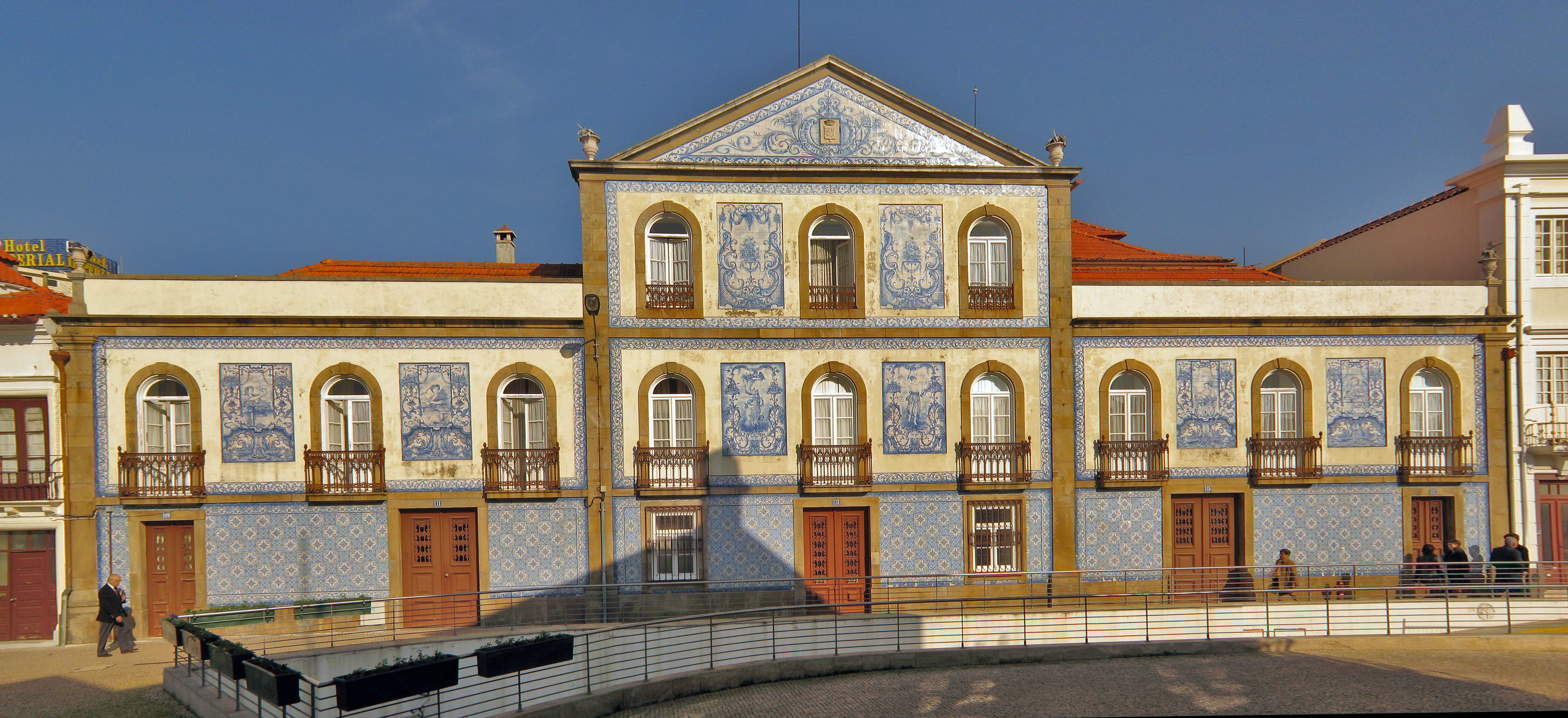
Façade of a grand house in Aveiro, Portugal.

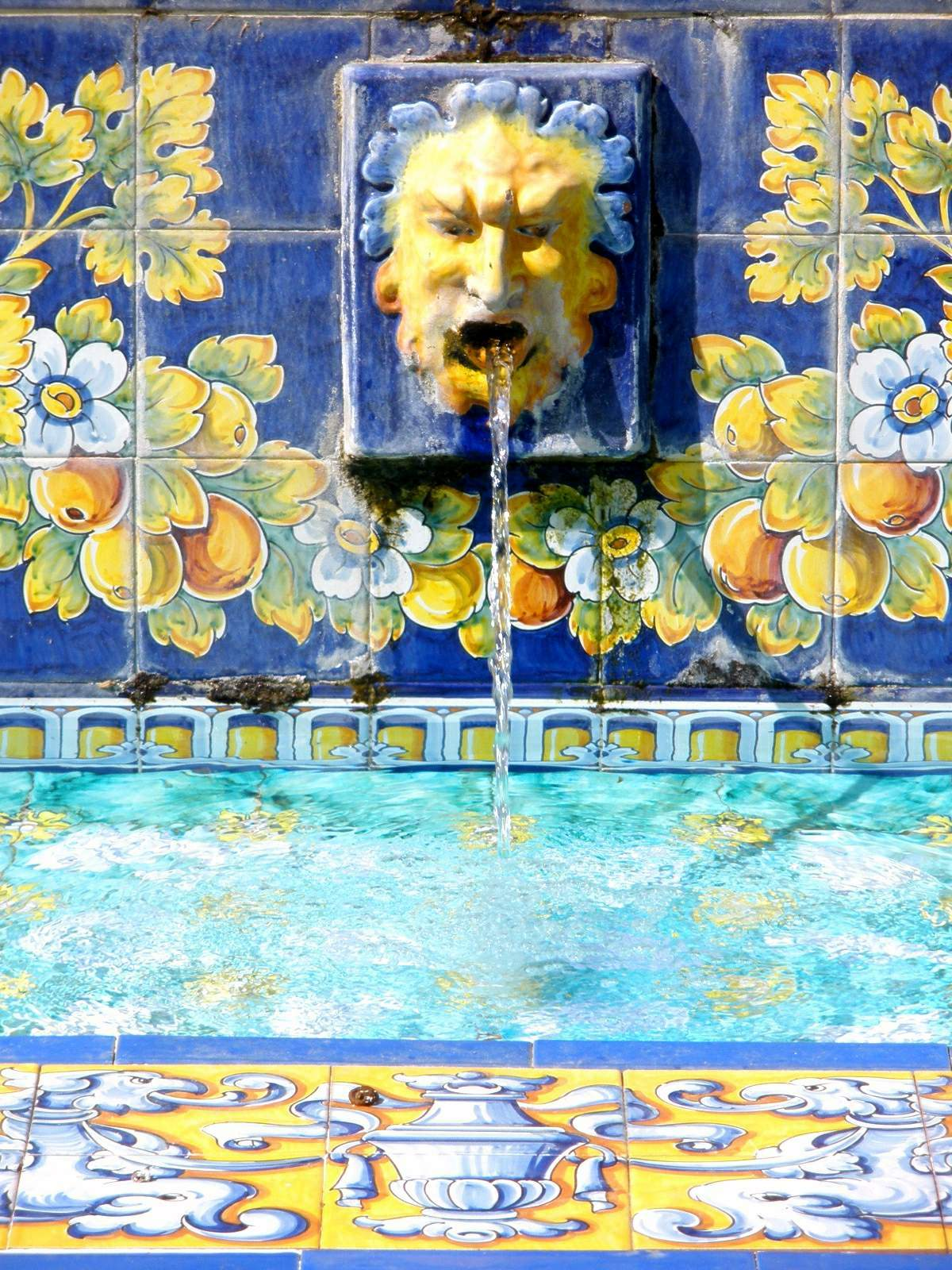
Jardines del Prado garden in Talavera de la Reina, Spain. Built in 1864.

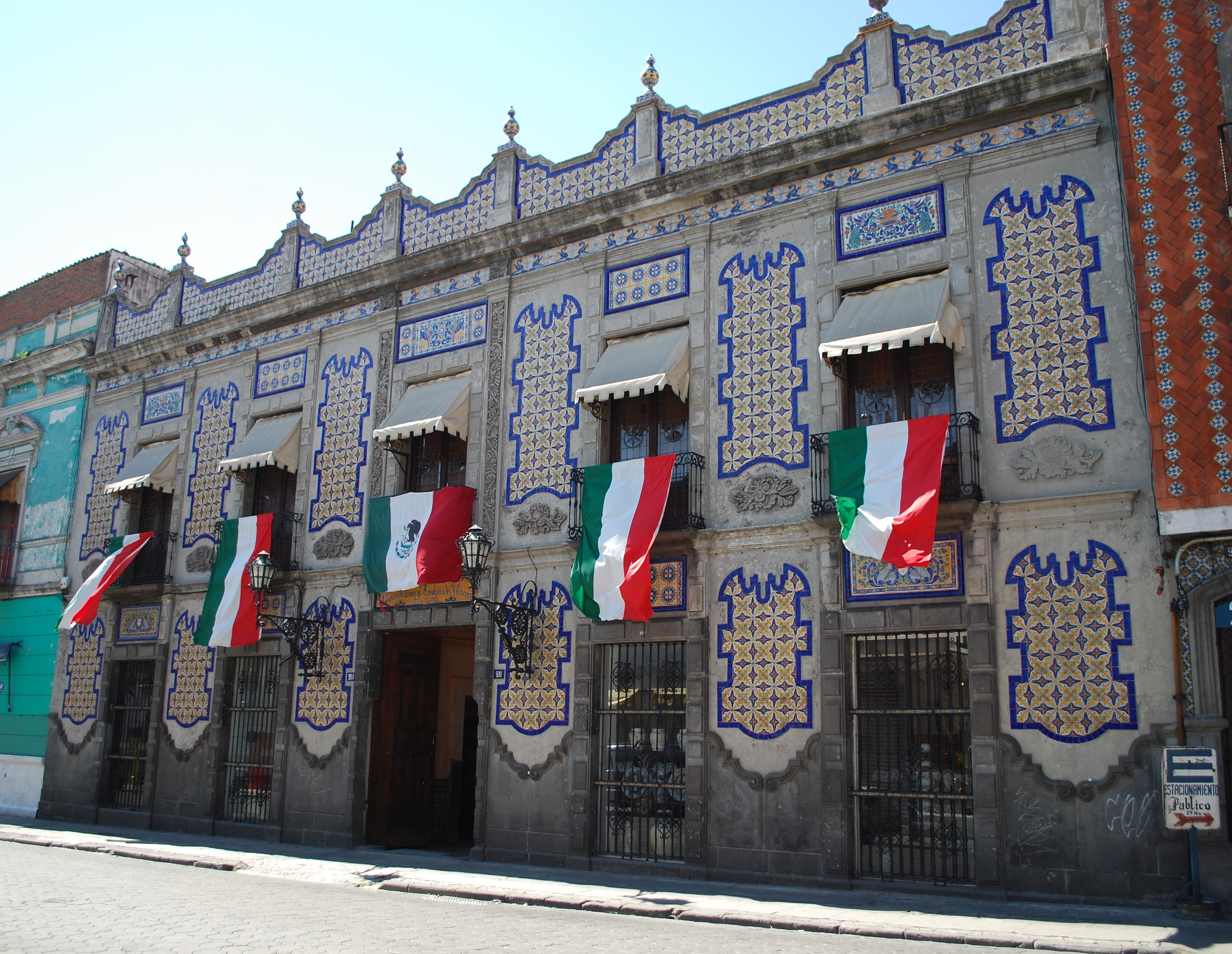
Uriarte Talavera, ca. 1824, Puebla, Mexico

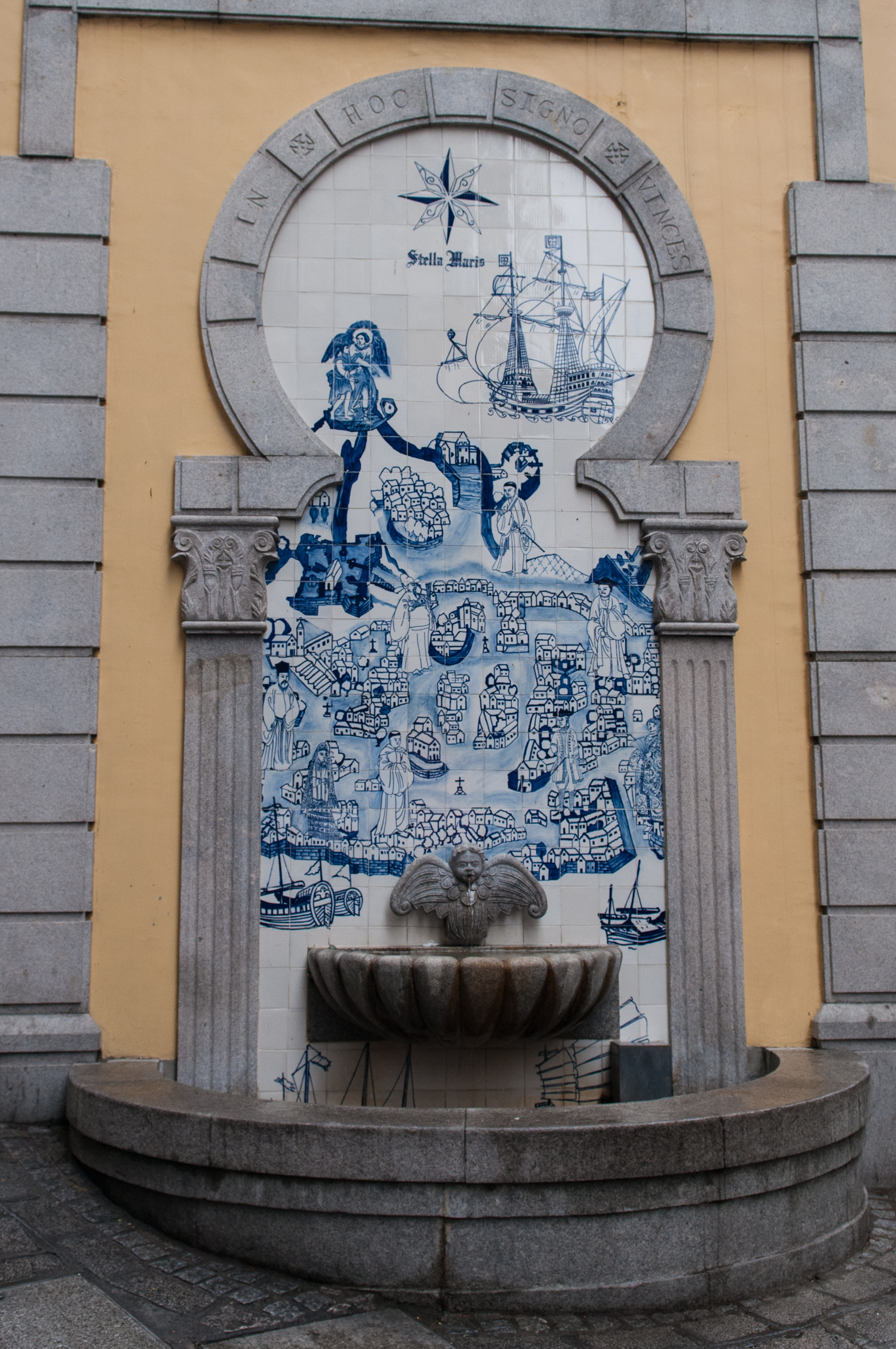
Portuguese Azulejos in Macau

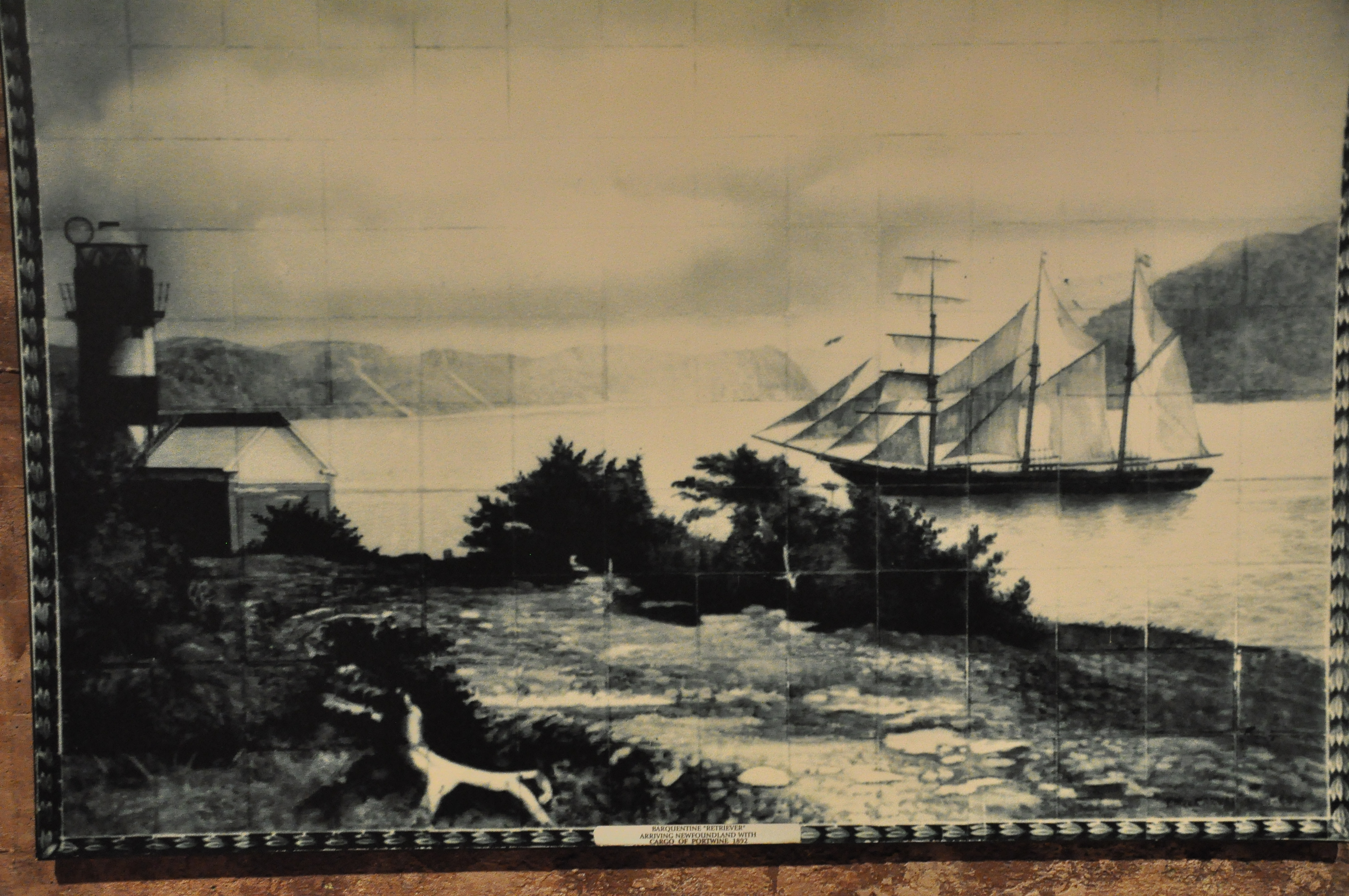
Portuguese Azulejo depicting the arrival of a ship with Port wine cargo in St. John's, Canada, 1892

=== 20th century ===
At the start of the 20th century, Art Nouveau azulejos started to appear from artists such as Rafael Bordalo Pinheiro, Júlio César da Silva and José António Jorge Pinto. In 1885 Rafael Bordalo Pinheiro founded a ceramics factory in Caldas da Rainha, where he created many of the pottery designs for which this city is known. In this factory he has his own a museum São Rafael devoted to his fantastically imaginative work, especially the decorative plates and his satirical stone figures, such as the Zé Povinho (a representation of the worrying common man).

Around the 1930s, Art Deco-azulejos made their appearance with their principal artist António Costa. The monumental decorations, consisting of 20,000 azulejos, in the vestibule of the São Bento railway station in Porto, created by Jorge Colaço, show in its historical themes the narrative style of the romantic 'picture-postcard'.Colaço reintroduced the medium of azulejo as a central focus of his work. He developed methods that broadened the range of colors and visual effects achievable in tile panels, though some contemporaries raised concerns about their long-term durability. These techniques were applied in large-scale decorative projects like the São Bento railway station.

This one of the most notable creations with azulejos of the 20th century. The façades of the churches of Santo Ildefonso and Congregados equally attest to the artistic mastery of Jorge Colaço. Other artists from this period include Mário Branco and Silvestre Silvestri, who decorated in 1912 the lateral façade of the Carmo Church, and Eduardo Leite for his work on the Almas Chapel (imitating the style of the 18th century), both in Porto.

20th-century artists include Jorge Barradas, Carlos Botelho, Jorge Martins, Sá Nogueira, Menez and Paula Rego. Maria Keil designed the large abstract panels in the initial nineteen stations of the Lisbon Underground (between 1957 and 1972). Through these works she became a driving force in the revival and the updating of the art of the azulejo, which had gone in some decline. Her decorations of the station Intendente is considered a masterpiece of contemporary tile art.

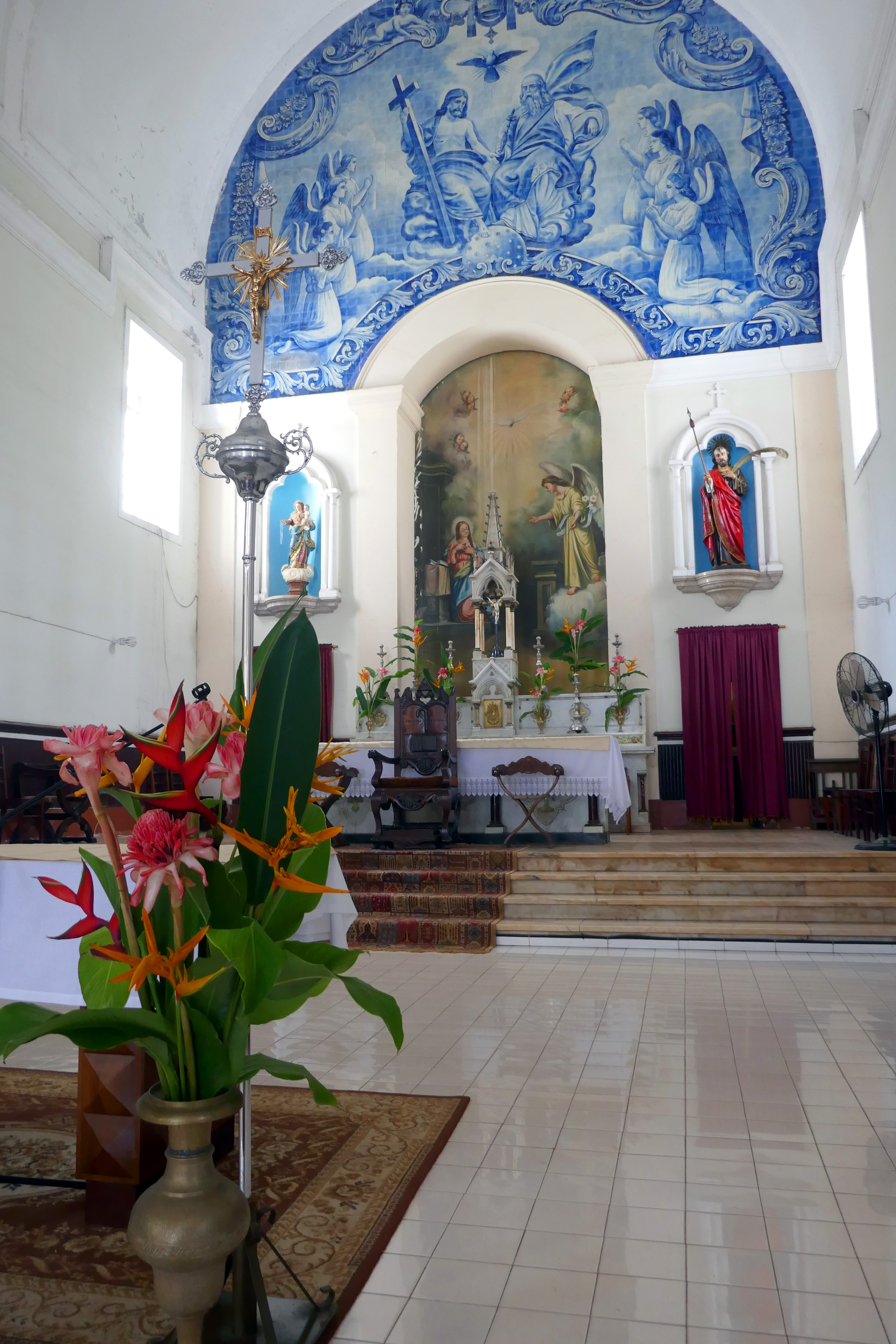
Inside the Grace Cathedral, São Tomé

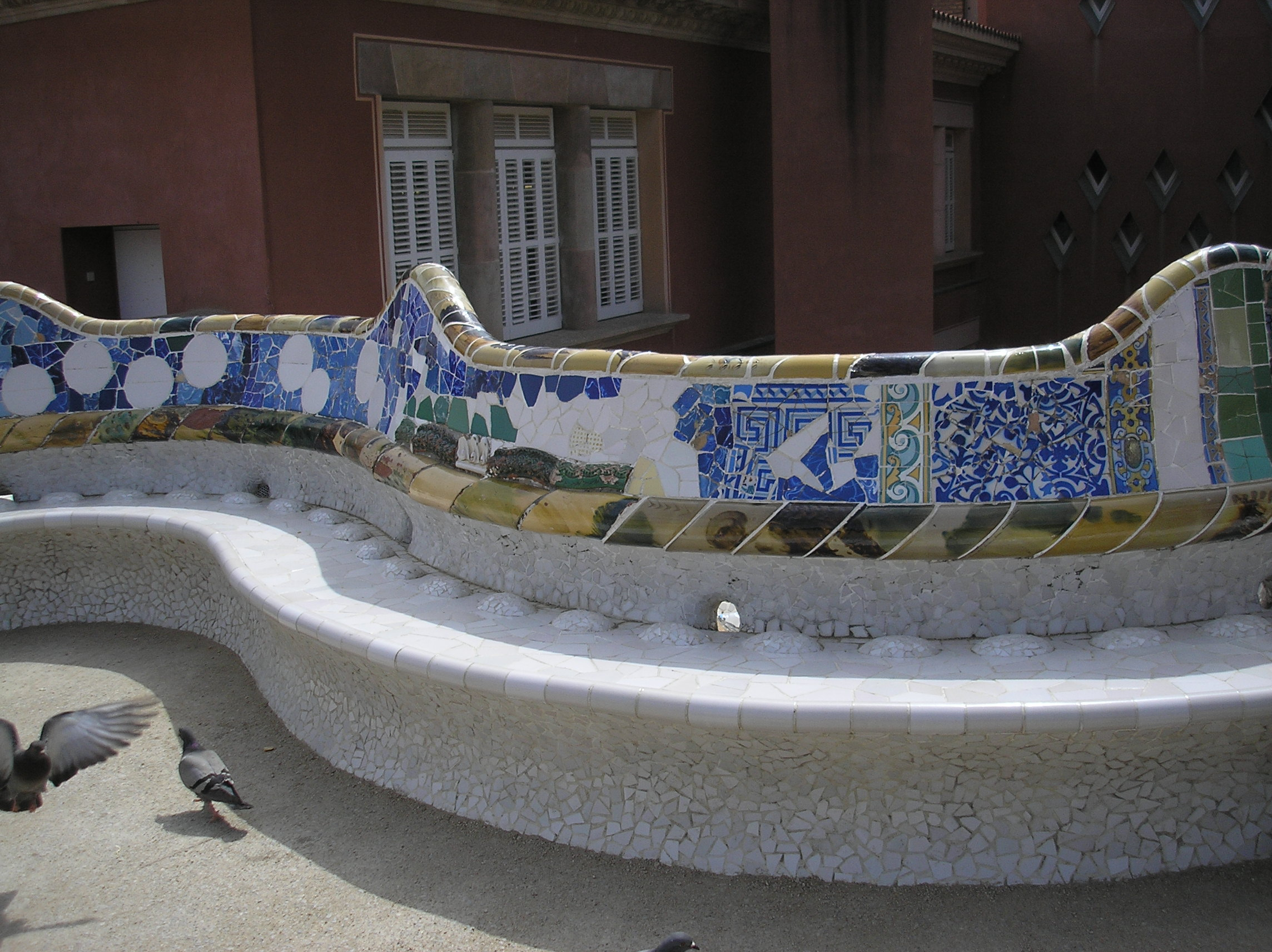
Park Güell, Barcelona, of 1914.

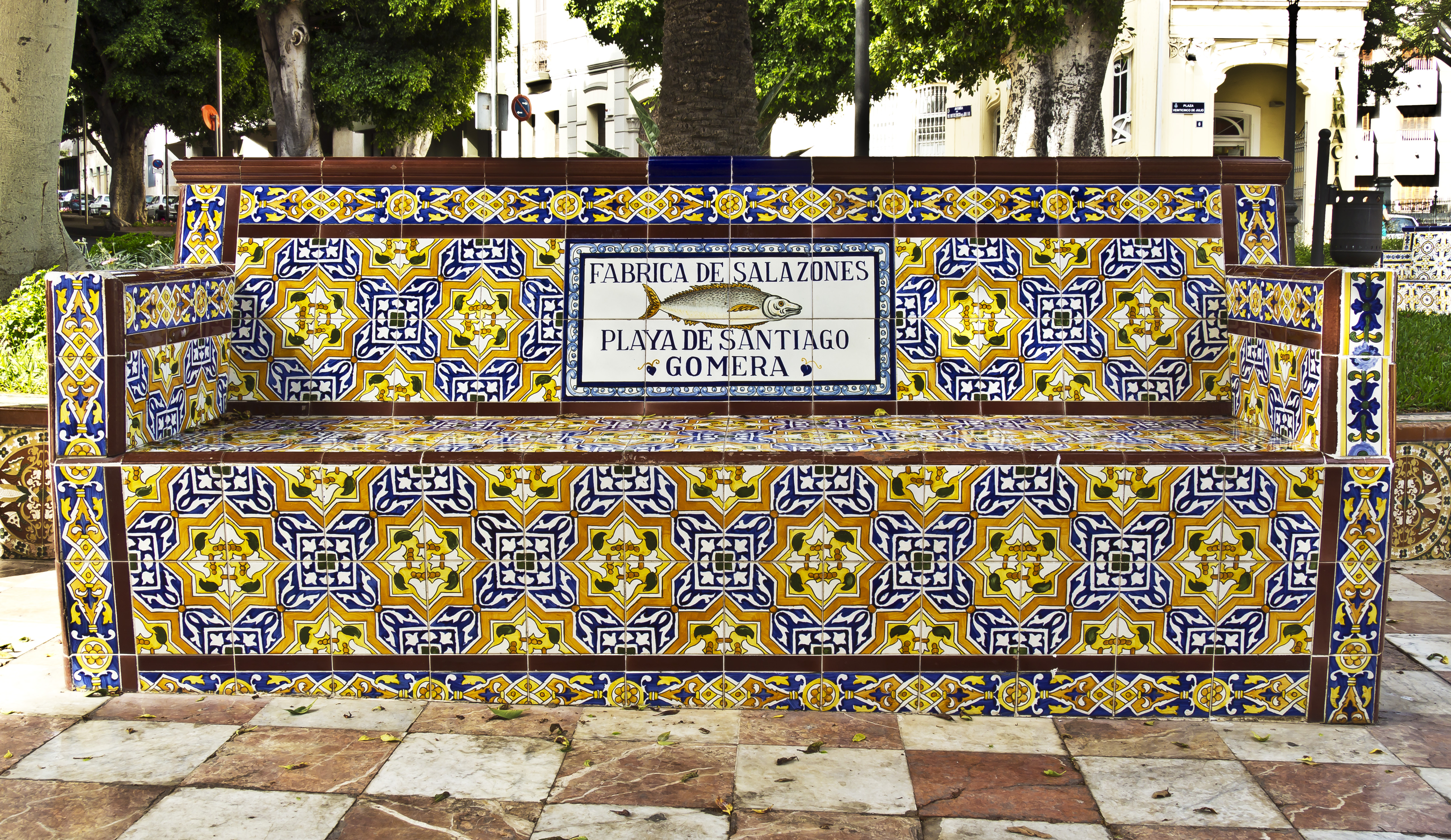
One of the several tiled benches of the Plaza 25 de Julio built in 1917, Santa Cruz de Tenerife, Canary Islands

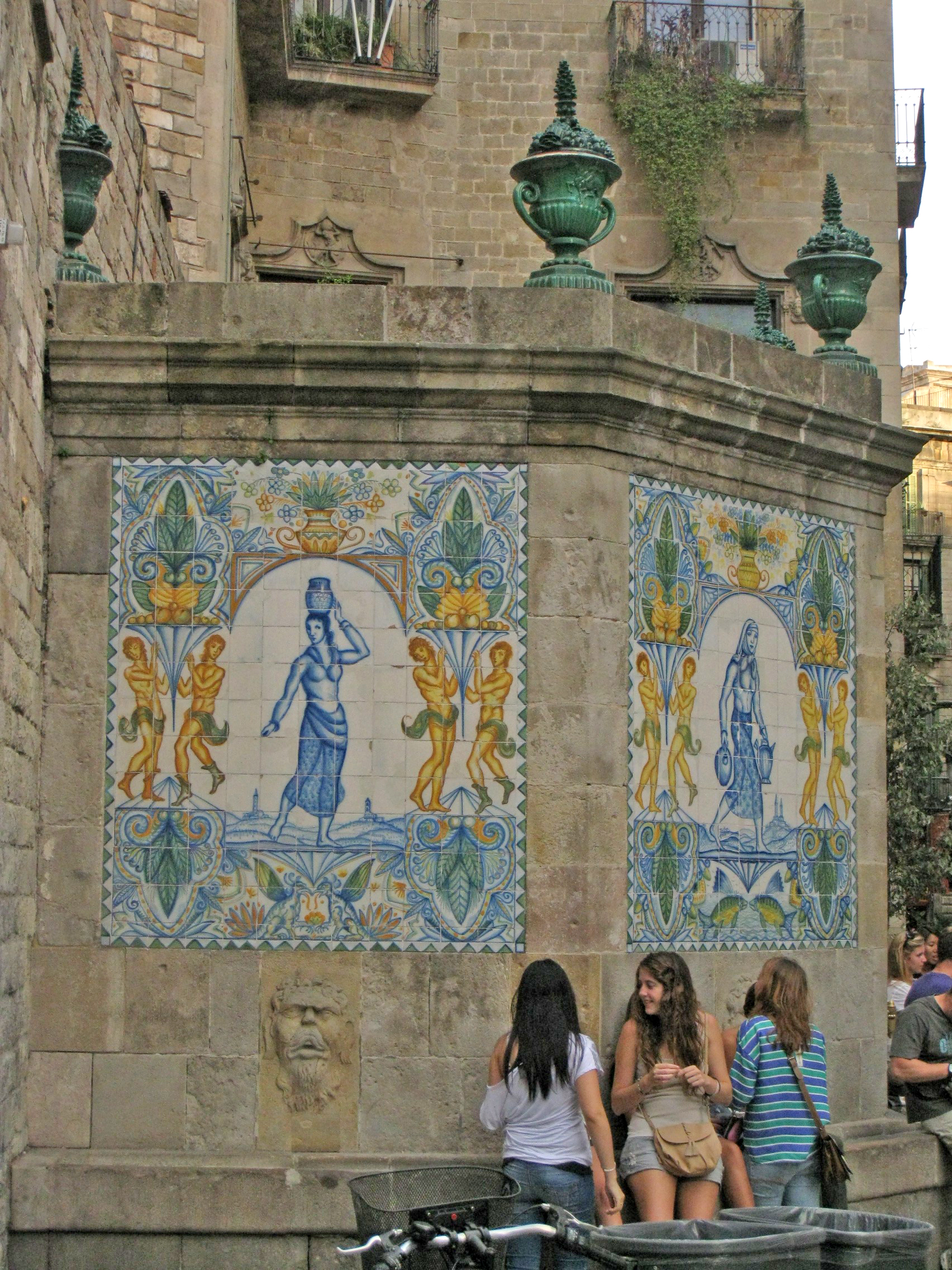
Azulejos made in 1918 in Font de Santa Anna, Barcelona

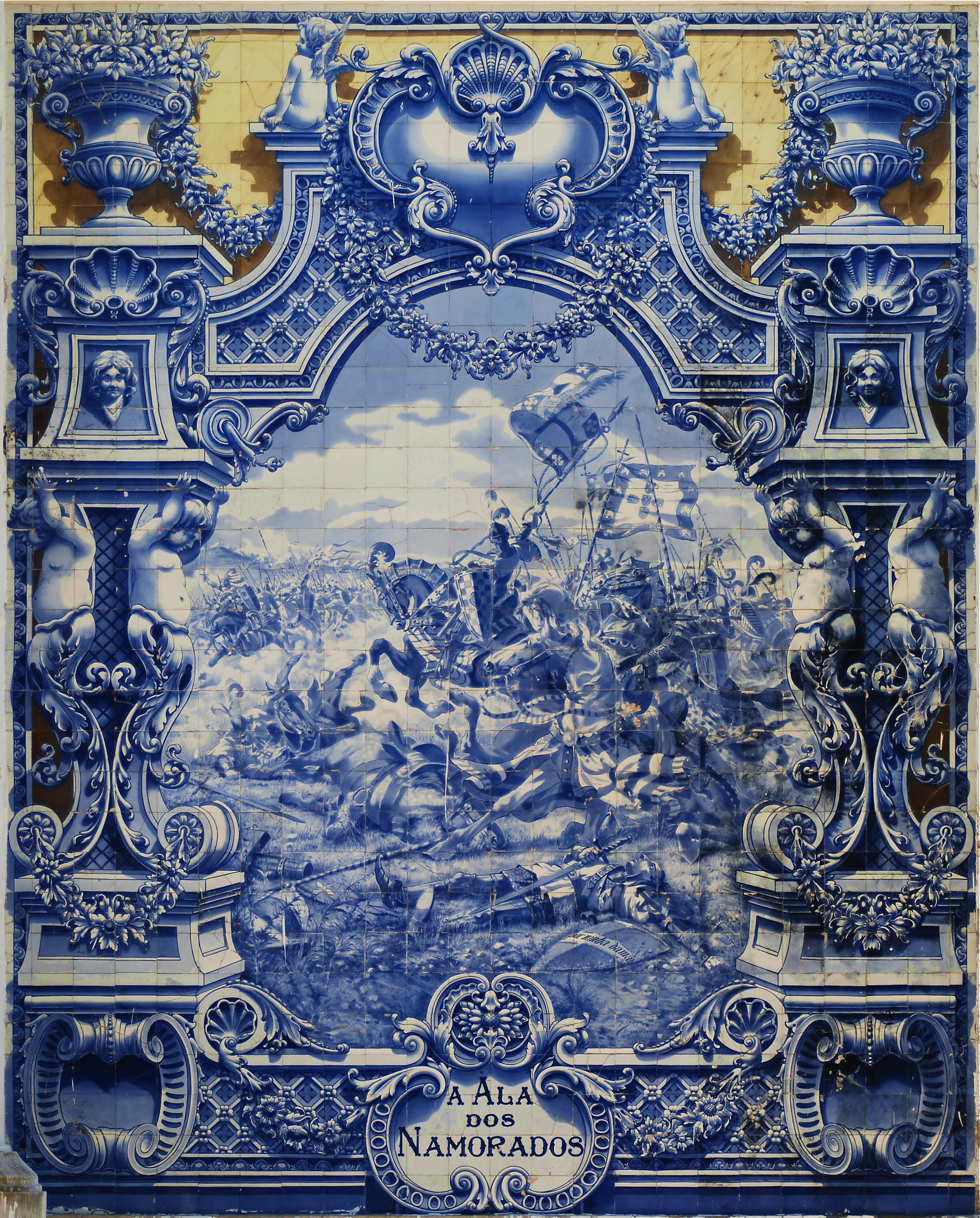
Panel by Jorge Colaço (circa 1922) depicting an episode from the battle of Aljubarrota (1385) between the Portuguese and Castilian armies, Lisbon, Portugal.

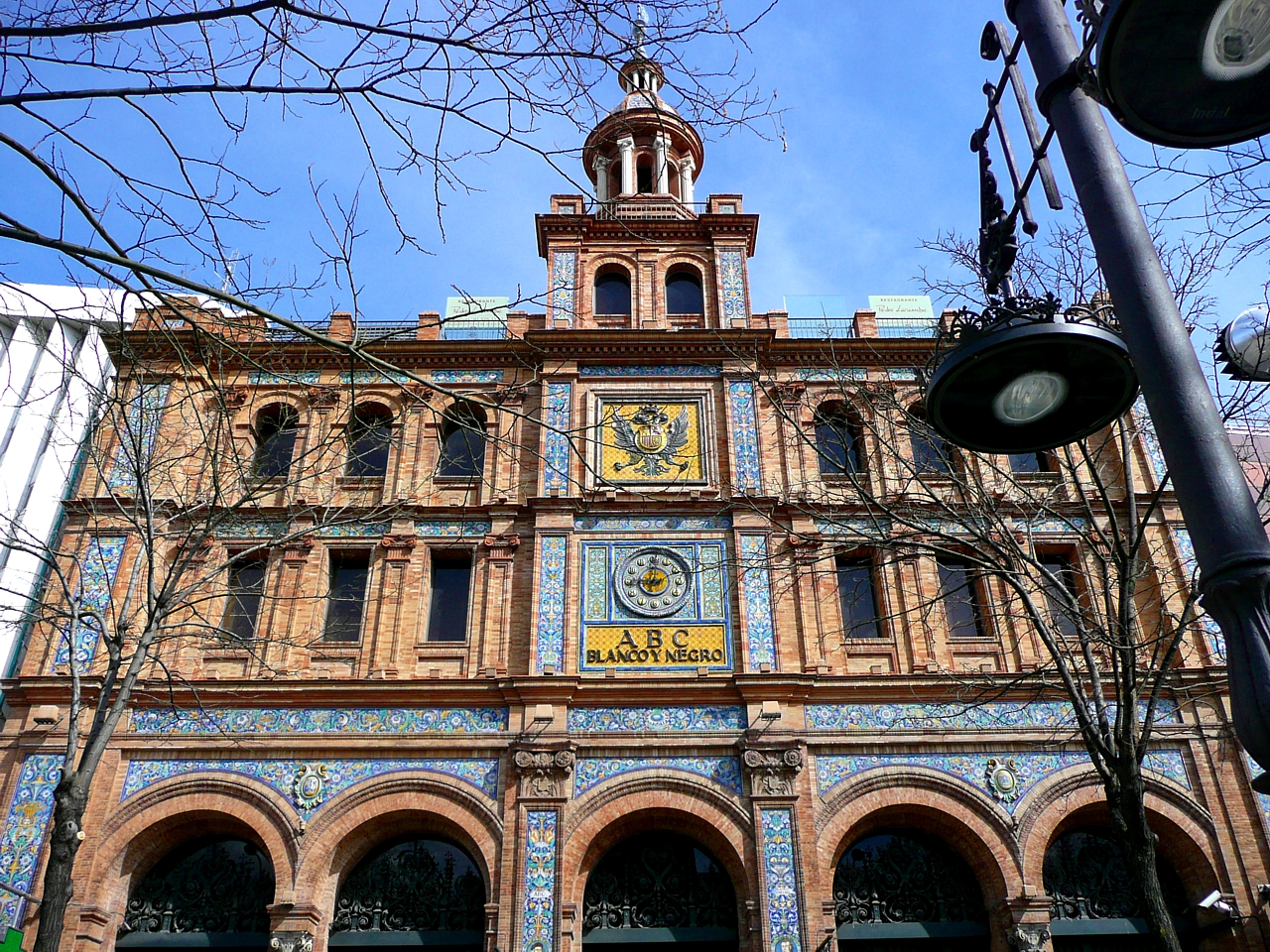
ABC Serrano Building built by Aníbal González in 1926, Madrid

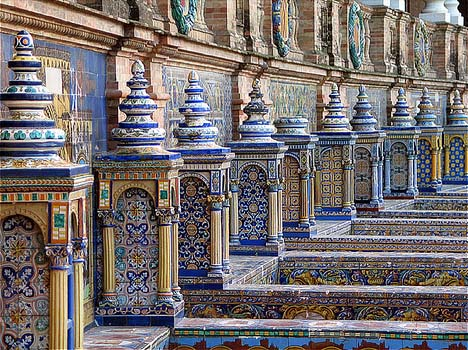
Plaza de España, Seville, of 1928.

Capela de Santa Catarina, Porto; façade was covered in 1929.

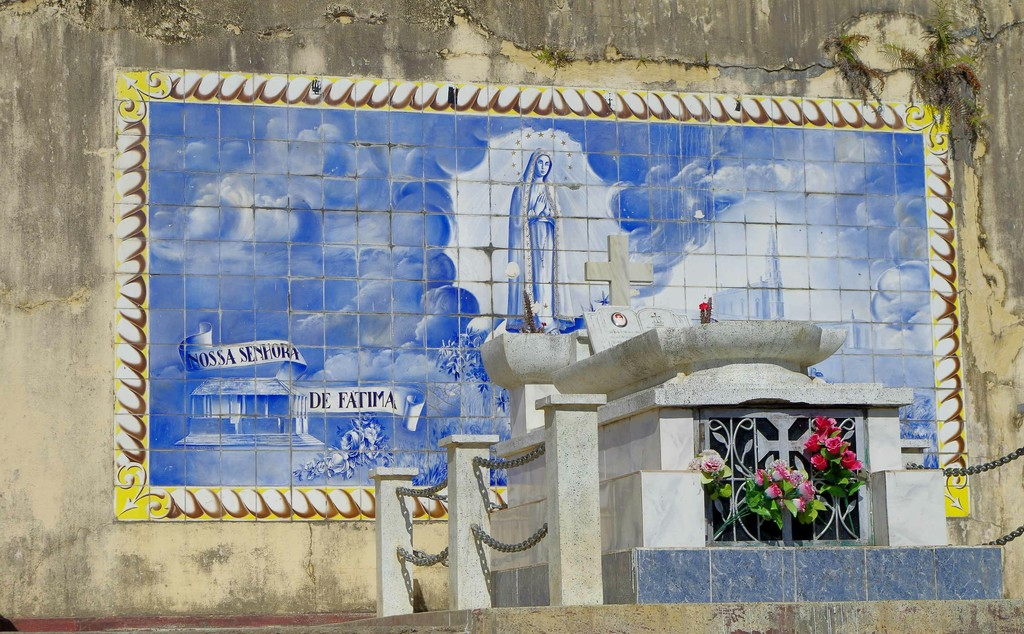
Portuguese Azulejos depicting the image of Our Lady of Fátima, Ermera, East Timor.

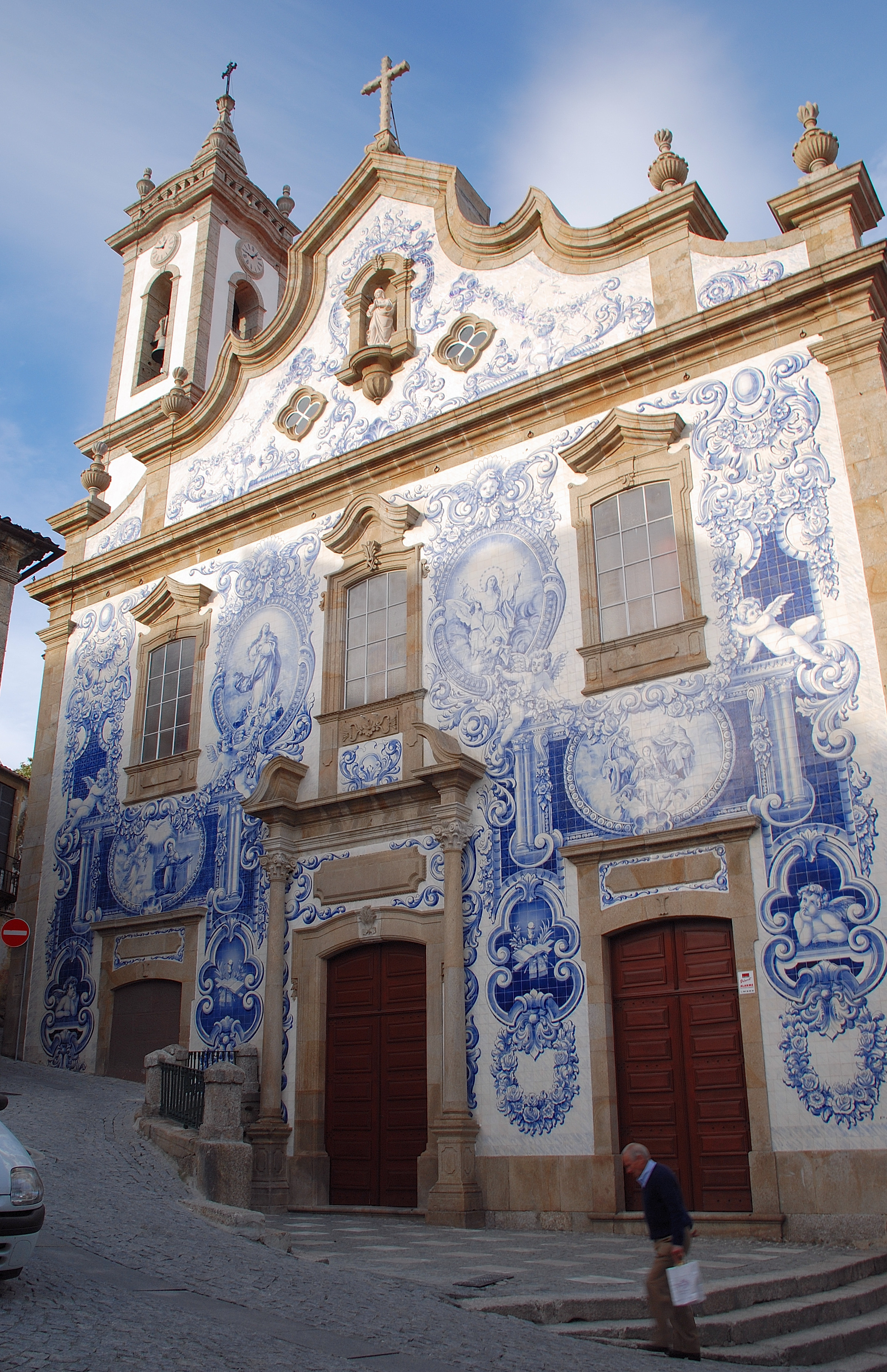
Santa Maria Church in Covilhã; façade was covered in the 1940s.

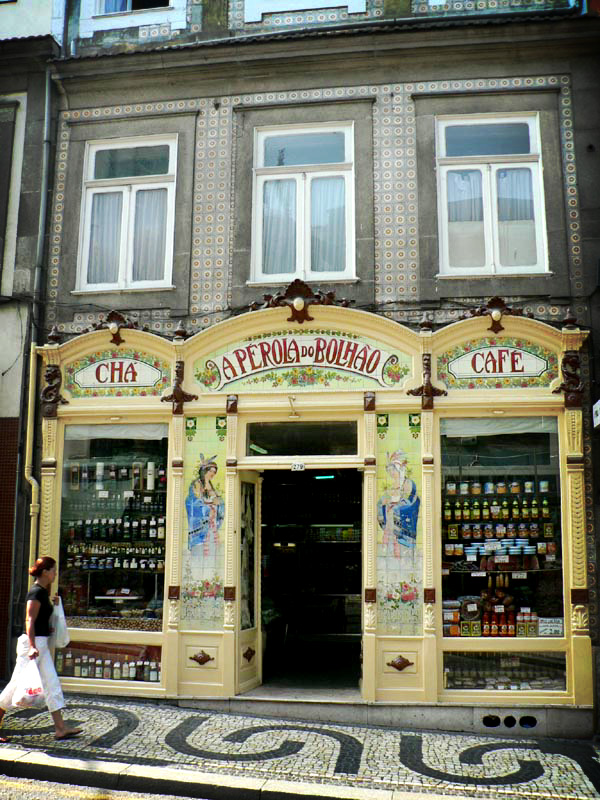
Art Nouveau azulejos on a shop in Porto.

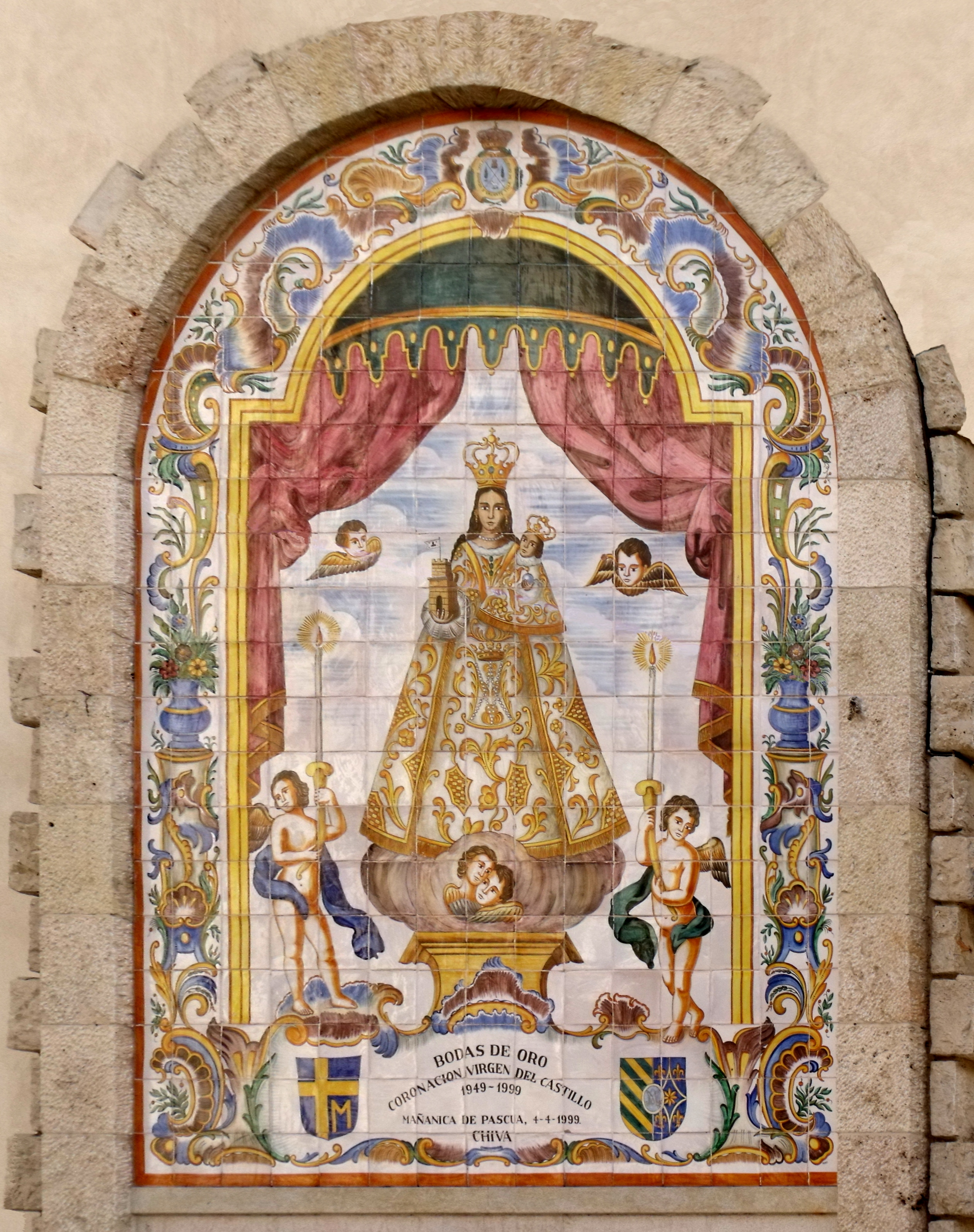
Iglesia de San Juan Bautista de Chiva, Valencia.

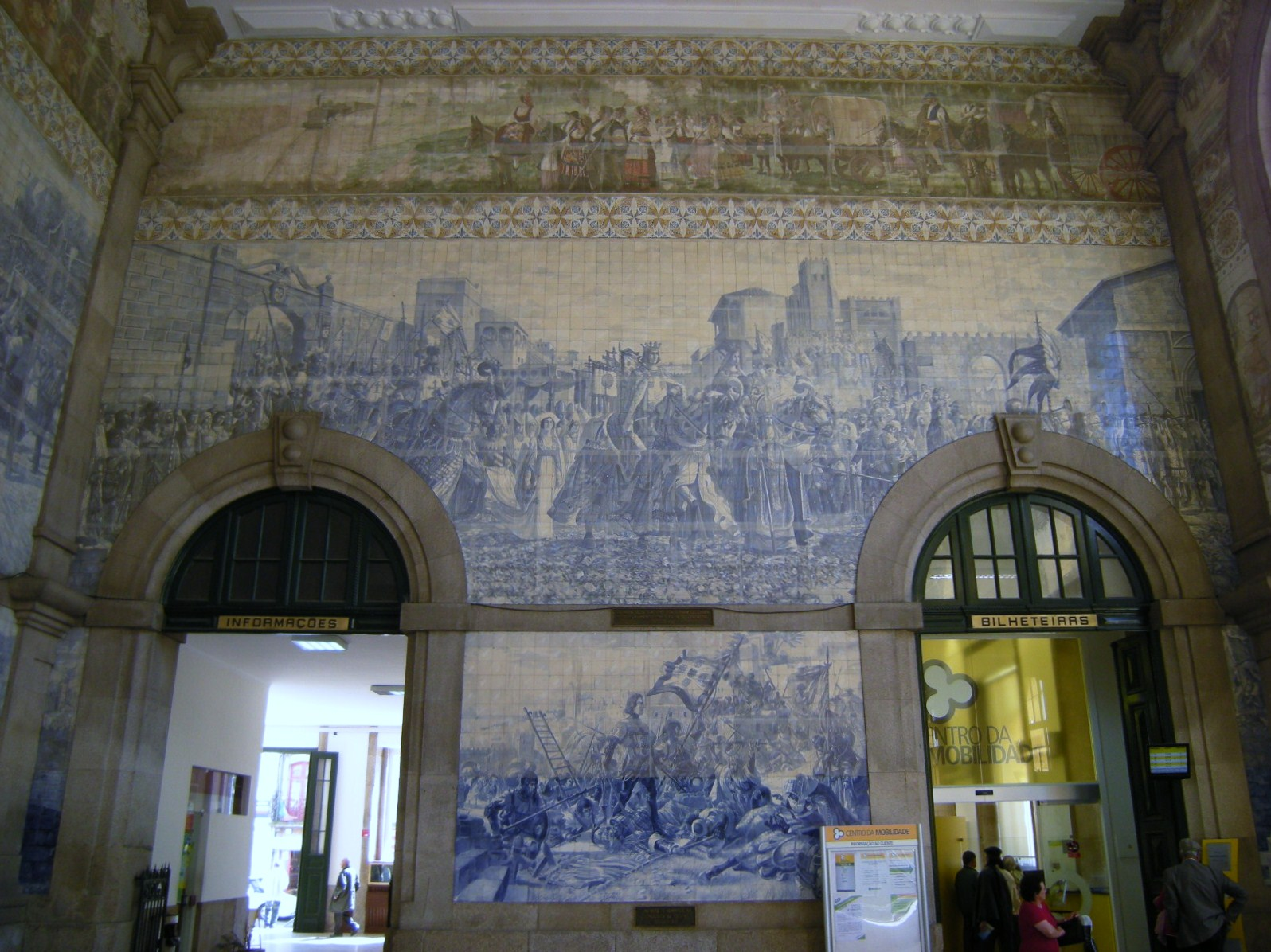
Interior of the São Bento railway station, Porto, Portugal, around twenty thousand tiles (551 square meters) installed in the building were created in the 1930s by the painter Jorge Colaço.

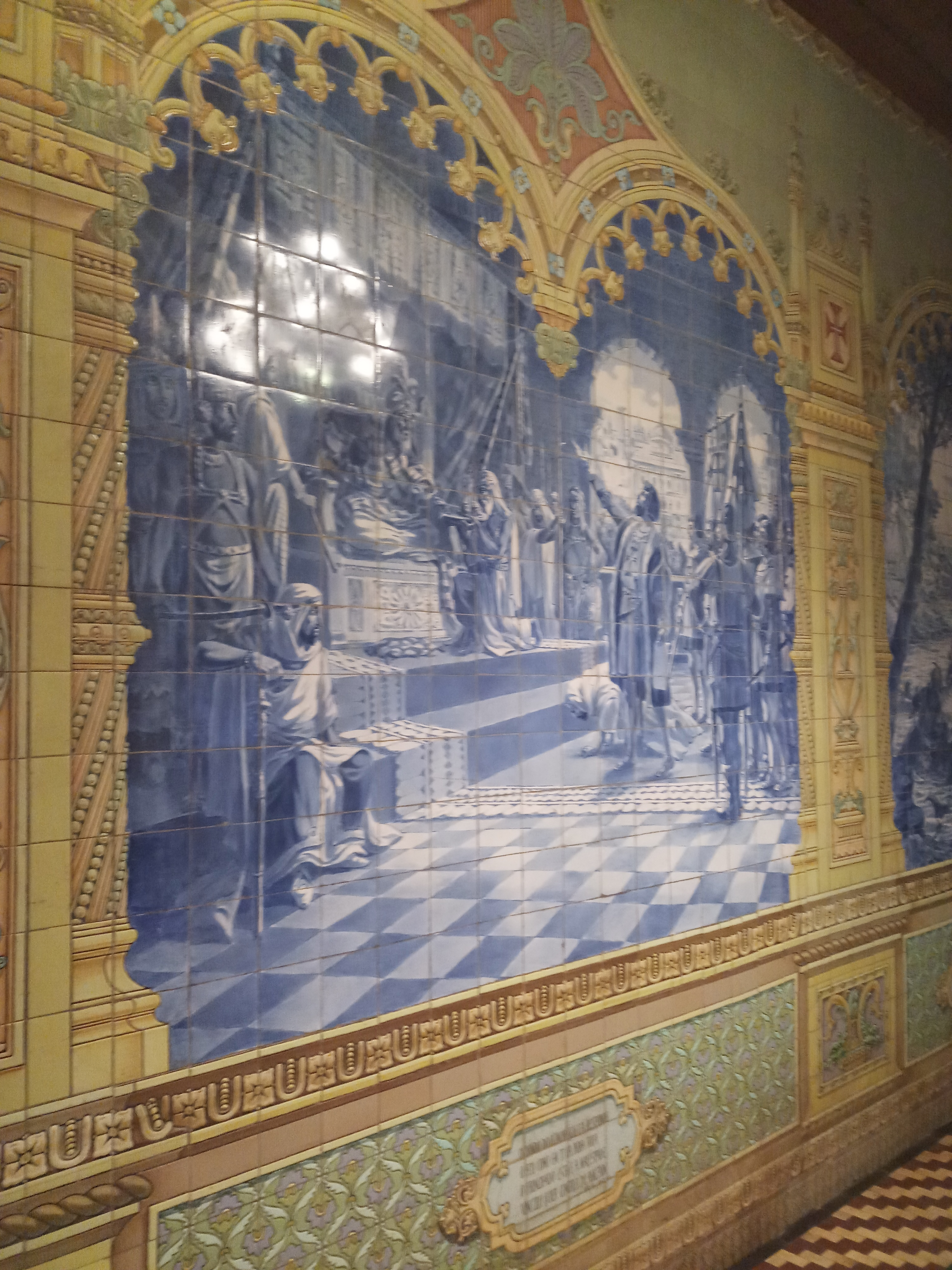
Portuguese Azulejos, at the Instituto Menezes Bragança, in the former Portuguese colony in India, Goa.

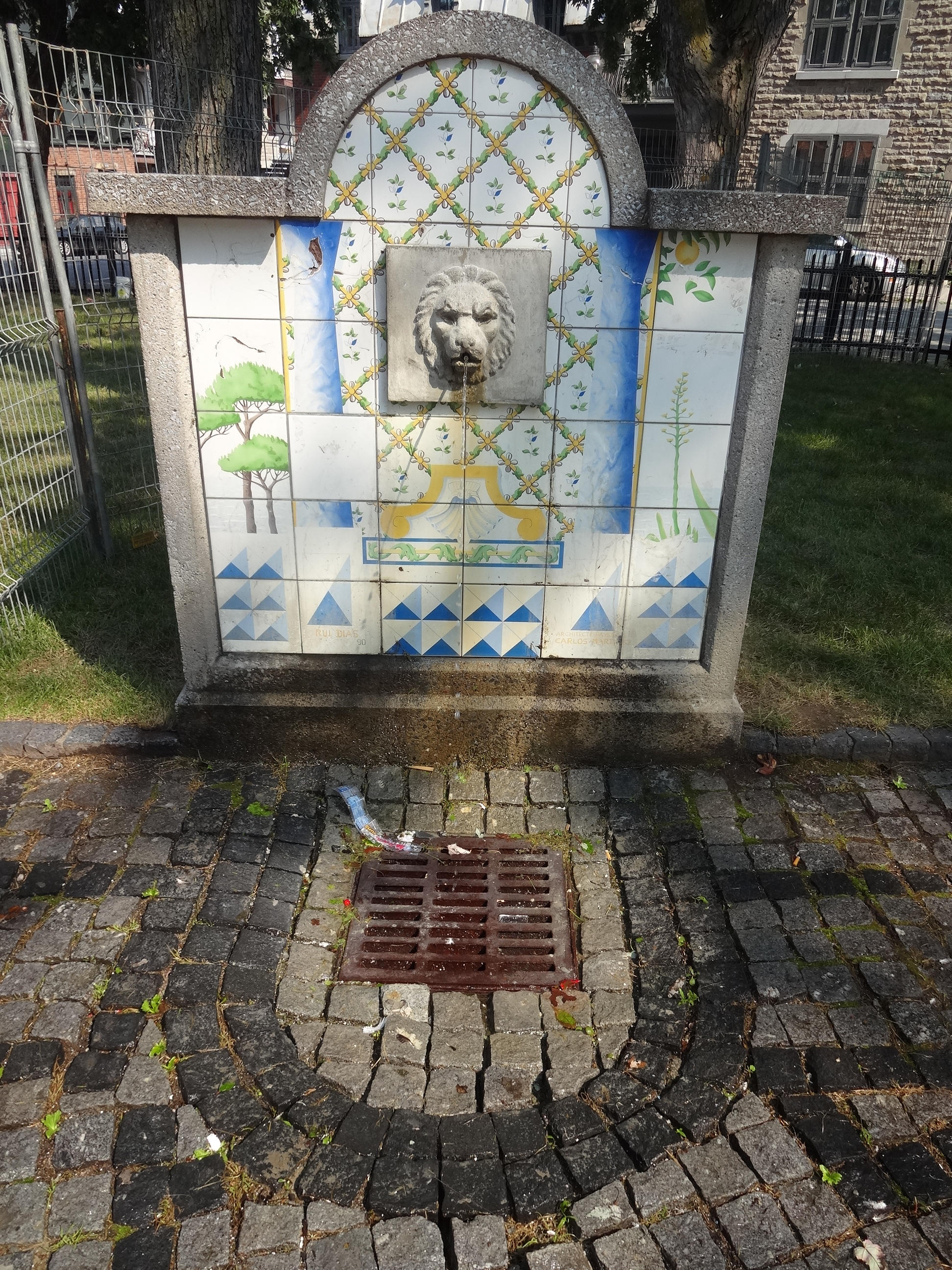
Azulejos in Parc du Portugal, founded in 1953, Little Portugal, Montreal, Canada

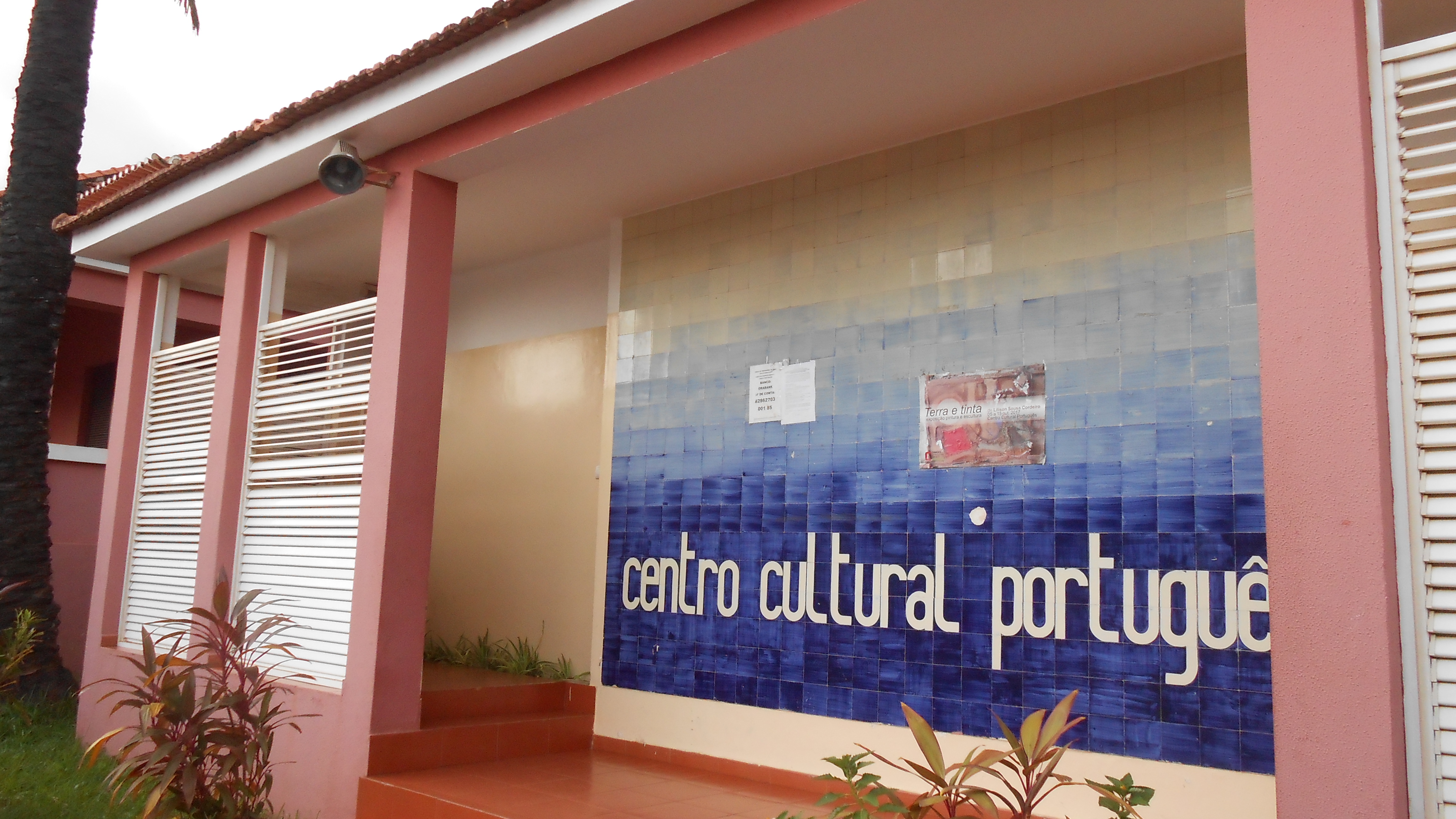
Portuguese Azulejos in Bissau, Guinea-Bissau

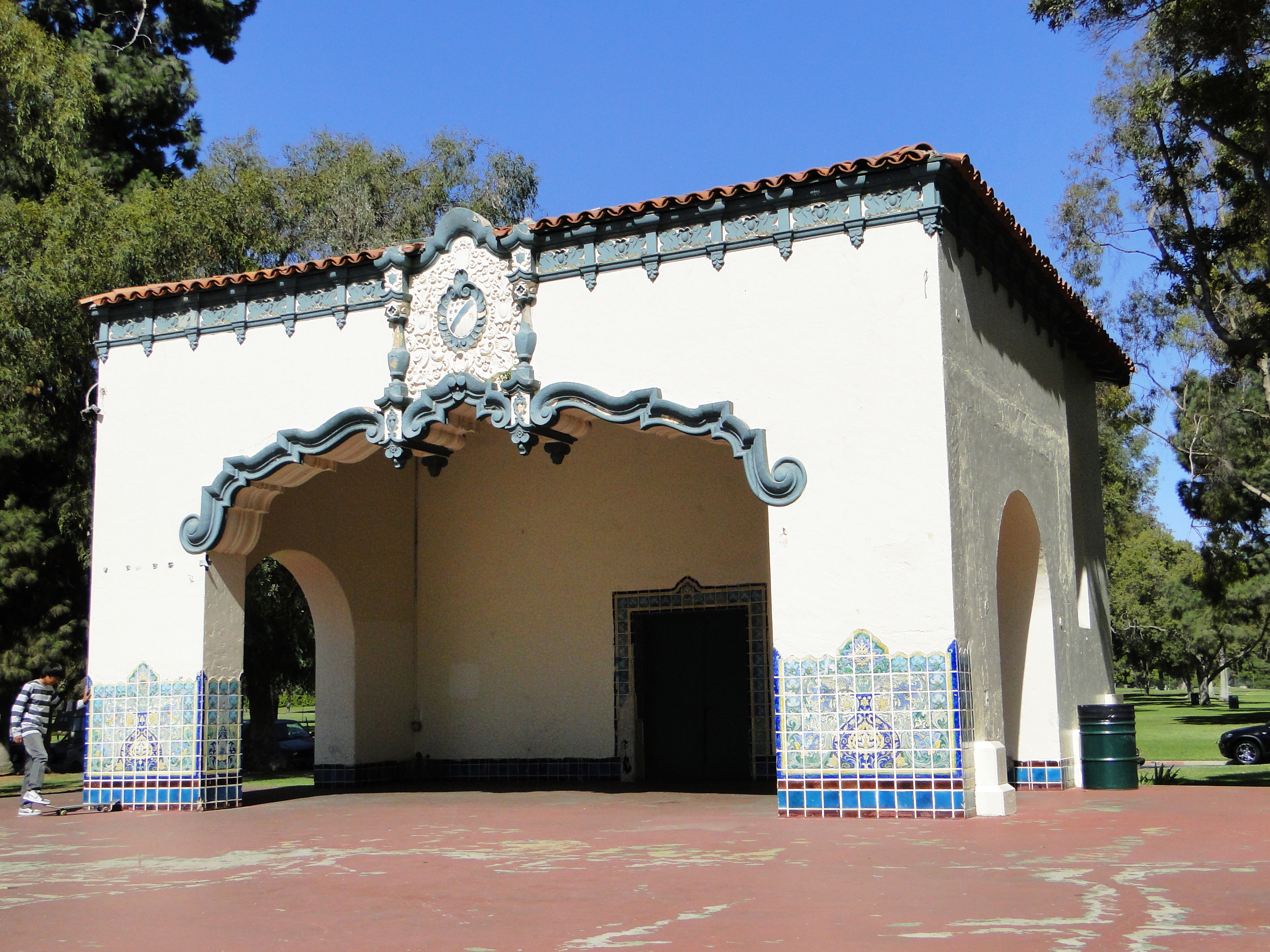
Californian Azulejos, at one of the Long Beach Historic Landmarks, Recreation Park bandshell, US

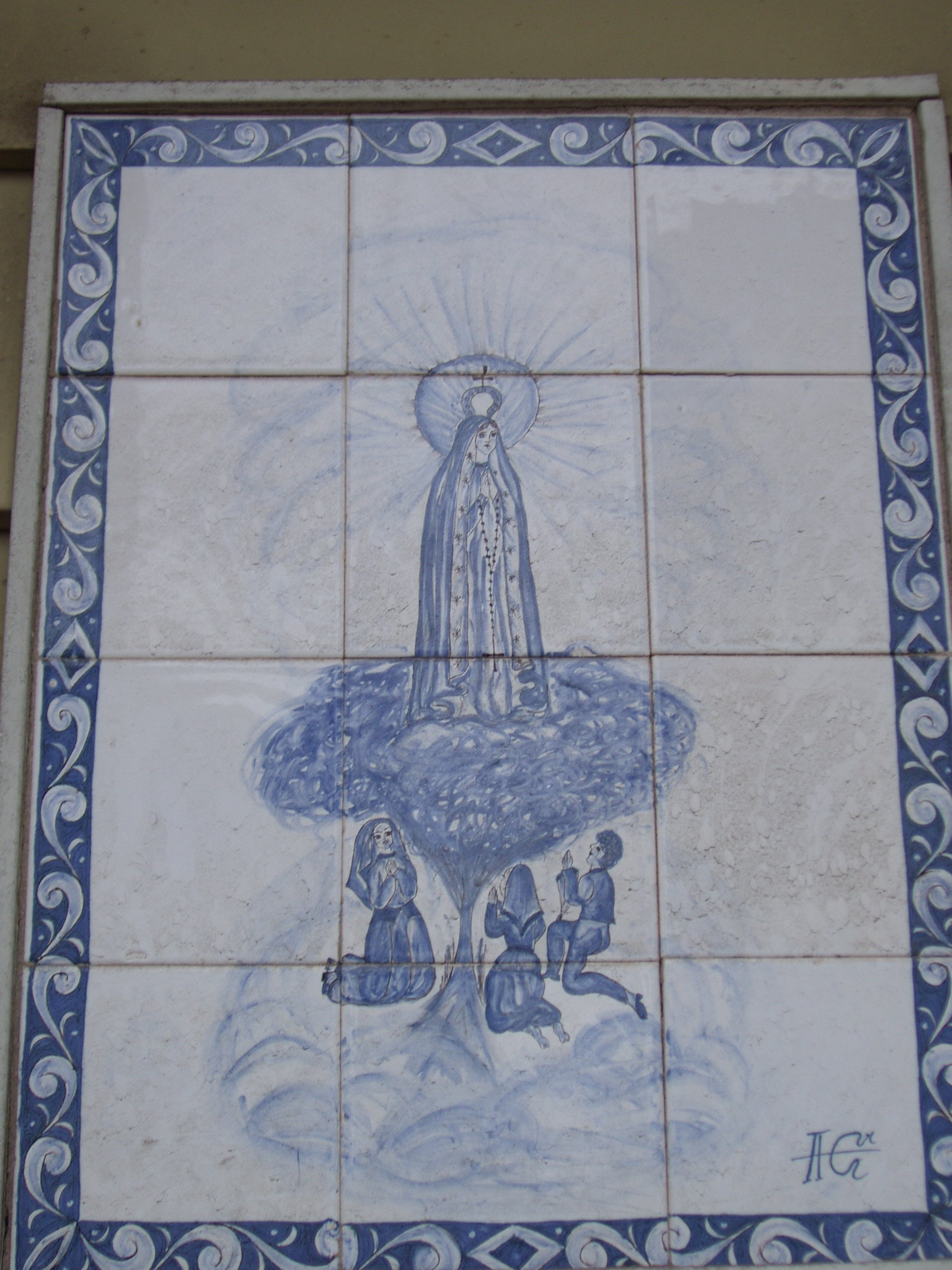
Luso-American Azulejos depicts an image of Our Lady of Fátima, in The Ironbound, Newark, United States

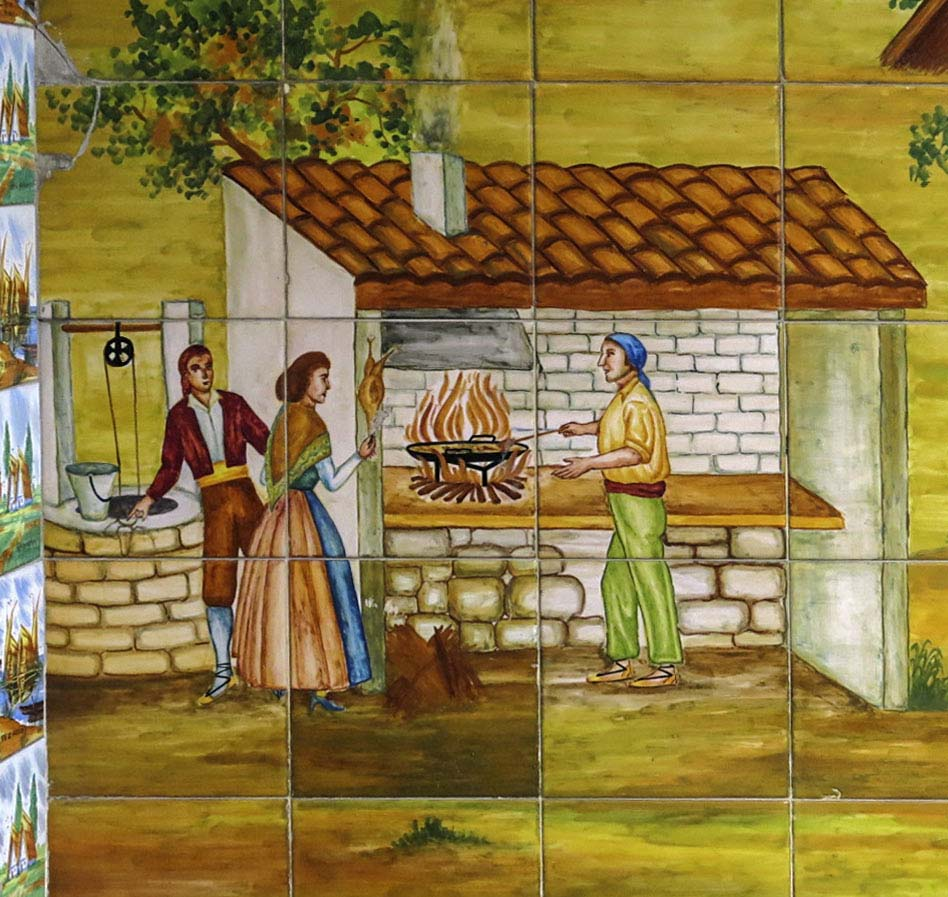
Manises tile, in Alginet

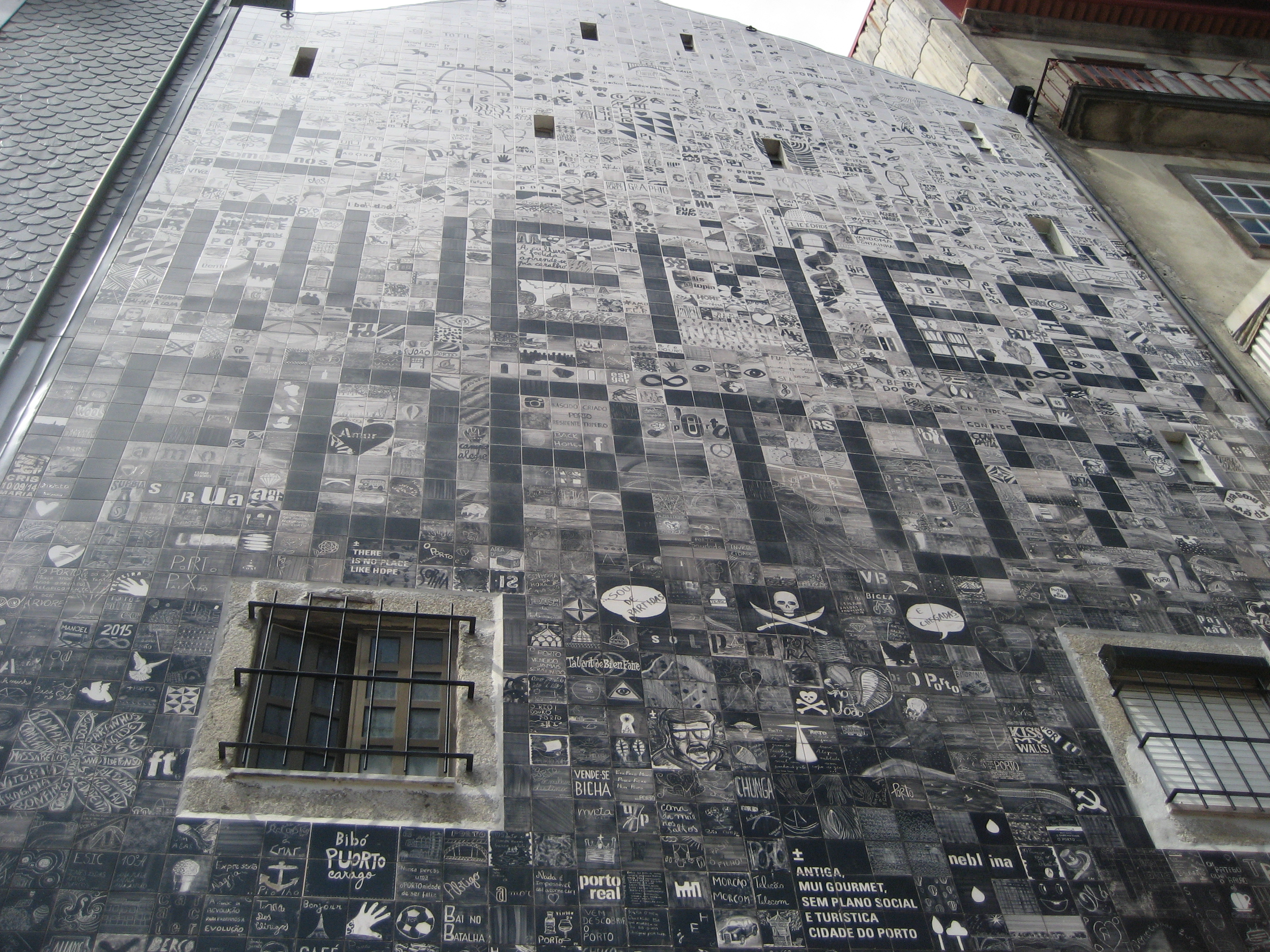
21st-century azulejos (Porto)

== Lisbon Metro ==
Azulejo tiles are present in almost every station in the Lisbon Metro system. Initially, painter Maria Keil (1914–2012), wife of metro system architect Francisco Keil do Amaral (1910–1975), created the works for the Metro stations.

A new expansion, completed in 1988, featured works by more contemporary Portuguese artists: Rolando de Sá Nogueira in Laranjeiras, Júlio Pomar in Alto dos Moinhos, Manuel Cargaleiro in Colégio Militar/Luz, and Maria Helena Vieira da Silva in Cidade Universitária. Following on from this, many artists have been commissioned to decorate new and refurbished stations.

=== Pieces ===
Station	Line	Artist(s) and date of completion
Alameda	Green	Maria Keil, 1972, & Noronha da Costa,1998
Alameda	Red	Costa Pinheiro, Alberto Carneiro, & Juahana Bloomstedt, 1998
Alfornelos	Blue	Ana Vidigal, 2004
Alto dos Moinhos	Blue	Júlio Pomar, 1988
Alvalade	Green	Maria Keil, 1972, Bela Silva, 2006, & Maria Keil, 2007
Amadora Este	Blue	Graça Morais, 2004
Ameixoeira	Yellow	Irene Buarque, 2004
Anjos	Green	Maria Keil, 1966 & Rogério Ribeiro, 1982
Areeiro	Green	Maria Keil, 1972 & Júlia Ventura, 2013
Arroios	Green	Maria Keil, 1972
Avenida	Blue	Rogério Ribeiro, 1959, 1982
Baixa-Chiado	Blue	Ângelo de Sousa, 1998
Baixa-Chiado	Green	Ângelo de Sousa, 1998
Bela Vista	Red	Querubim Lapa, 1998
Cabo Ruivo	Red	David de Almeida, 1998
Cais do Sodré	Green	António Dacosta, 1998 & Pedro Morais, 1998
Campo Grande	Yellow	Eduardo Nery, 1993
Campo Grande	Green	Eduardo Nery, 1993
Campo Pequeno	Yellow	Maria Keil, 1959, 1979, & Francisco Simões, 1994
Carnide	Blue	José de Guimarães, 1997
Chelas	Red	Jorge Martins, 1998
Cidade Universitária	Yellow	Manuel Cargaleiro (Transposition in azulejo of a 1940 painting by Vieira da Silva), 1988
Colégio Militar/Luz	Blue	Manuel Cargaleiro, 1988
Entre Campos	Yellow	Maria Keil, 1959, 1973, & Bartolomeu Cid dos Santos, 1993, & José de Santa Bárbara, 1993
Intendente	Green	Maria Keil, 1966 e 1977
Jardim Zoológico	Blue	Maria Keil, 1959 & Júlio Resende, 1995
Laranjeiras	Blue	Rolando Sá Nogueira (in collaboration with Fernando Conduto) 1988
Lumiar	Yellow	António Moutinho, Marta Lima, & Susete Rebelo, 2004
Marquês de Pombal	Yellow	Menez, 1995
Marquês de Pombal	Blue	Maria Keil, João Cutileiro, & Charters de Almeida, 1995
Martim Moniz	Green	Maria Keil, 1966, & Gracinda Candeias, 1997, & José João Brito, 1997
Moscavide	Red	Manuel Bastos, 2012
Olivais	Red	Nuno de Siqueira & Cecília de Sousa, 1998
Oriente	Red	António Ségui, Artur Boyd, Errö, Hundertwasser, Yayoi Kusama, Joaquim Rodrigo, Abdoulaye Konaté, Sean Scully, Raza, Zao Wou Ki, & Magdalena Abakanowicz, 1998
Parque	Blue	Maria Keil, 1959 & Françoise Schein, 1994 & Federica Matta, 1994 & João Cutileiro, 1995
Picoas	Yellow	Maria Keil, 1959, 1982, & Martins Correia, 1995
Pontinha	Blue	Jacinto Luís, 1997
Praça de Espanha	Blue	Maria Keil, 1959, 1980
Quinta das Conchas	Yellow	Joana Rosa, 2004 & Manuel Baptista, 2004
Rato	Yellow	Vieira da Silva (transposed to azulejo by Manuel Cargaleiro), & Arpad Szènés, 1997
Restauradores	Blue	Maria Keil, 1959, 1977, Luiz Ventura, 1994, Nadir Afonso & Lagoa Henriques, 1998
Roma	Green	Maria Keil, 1972, Lourdes de Castro & René Bertholo, 2006
Rossio	Green	Maria Keil, 1963 & Artur Rosa & Helena Almeida, 1998
Saldanha	Red	Almada Negreiros (transposed by José Almada Negreiros), 2009
Saldanha	Yellow	Maria Keil, 1959, 1977, Jorge Vieira, 1996, 1997, Luis Filipe de Abreu, 1996, 1997
Santa Apolónia	Blue	José Santa-Bárbara, 2007
São Sebastião	Blue	Maria Keil, 1959, 1977, 2009
São Sebastião	Red	Maria Keil, 2009 & Catarina Almada Negreiros, 2009 & Rita Almada Negreiros, 2009
Senhor Roubado	Yellow	José Pedro Croft, 2004
Telheiras	Green	Eduardo Batarda, 2002
Terreiro do Paço	Blue	João Vieira, 2007

== Traditions ==
- Hispano-Moresque ware (Spanish)
- Talavera de la Reina pottery (Spanish)
- Manises pottery (Spanish)
- Paterna pottery (Spanish)
- Talavera pottery (Mexican)
- Uriarte Talavera (Mexican)
- El Puente del Arzobispo pottery (Spanish)

== State of protection ==
Tiles are vulnerable to vandalism, neglect, and theft due to their prevalence and relative ease of access in historic and often decaying buildings across Portugal. In Lisbon, tiles can sometimes be found for sale in street fairs and the black market, despite efforts to raise awareness among buyers, many of whom are foreign tourists. Since 2013, it is illegal to demolish buildings with tile-covered façades in Portugal. The highest numbers of thefts are carried out in Lisbon; authorities estimate that 25% of artistic tiles in that city were lost between 1980 and 2000. The introduction of SOS Azulejo produced a substantial decrease, around 80 percent, in azulejo theft and vandalism from its inception until 2013. There was a slight decline in the following years, but SOS Azulejo still remains a key preventative and preservative measure.

The main azulejo protection group in Portugal, SOS Azulejo, created in 2007 and working as a dependency of Polícia Judiciária, has identified the limitation and control of the sale of ancient tiles in those markets as their main goal. The city of Lisbon has created the 'Banco do Azulejo' (tile bank), which collects and stores around 30,000 tiles from demolished or condemned buildings and from donations. There are similar projects in the cities of Aveiro, Porto, and Ovar.

In August 2017, a law was passed to prohibit both the demolition of buildings with tiles and renovation work involving the removal of tiles, even if only in the building's interior.

== See also ==
- Zellij – Mosaic tile decoration
- Portuguese architecture
- Portuguese pavement
- Spanish architecture
- Spanish Colonial architecture
- National Museum of the Azulejo

== Sources ==
- Morales, Alfredo J. – Francisco Niculoso Pisano, Arte Hispalense, Diputación de Sevilla, 1977, 1991
- dos Santos Simões, J. M. – Azulejaria em Portugal nos séculos XV e XVI : introdução geral, Calouste Gulbenkian Foundation, 2nd ed., Lisbon, 1990 (in Portuguese)
- Costa, Vania – Azulejo, Accessible Travel Magazine, September 2006
- Meco, José – O Azulejo em Portugal, Alfa, Lisbon, 1988 (in Portuguese)
- Castel-Branco Pereira, João – Portuguese tiles from the National Museum of Azulejo, Lisbon, 1995, ISBN 0-302-00661-3
- Turner, J. – Tile – History and Uses, Portugal in Grove Dictionary of Art, MacMillan, 1996, ISBN 0-19-517068-7
- The Rough Guide to Portugal – 11th edition March 2005 – ISBN 1-84353-438-X
- Rentes de Carvalho J. – Portugal, um guia para amigos – in Dutch translation: Portugal – De Arbeiderspers, Amsterdam, 9th ed., August 1999 ISBN 90-295-3466-4
- Mucznik, Sonia. – The Azulejos of Lisbon
- Sabo, Rioleta; Falcato, Jorge. N. and photographs by Nicolas Lemonnier – Portuguese Decorative Tiles, New York, London and Paris, 1998; ISBN 0-7892-0481-9
- Barros Veloso, A. J.; Almasqué, Isabel – Portuguese Tiles and Art Nouveau / O Azulejo Portugués ea Arte Nova, Edições Inapa, Portugal, 2000; ISBN 972-8387-64-4
