= Lumiar Station =

Metro station in Lisbon, Portugal

Lumiar
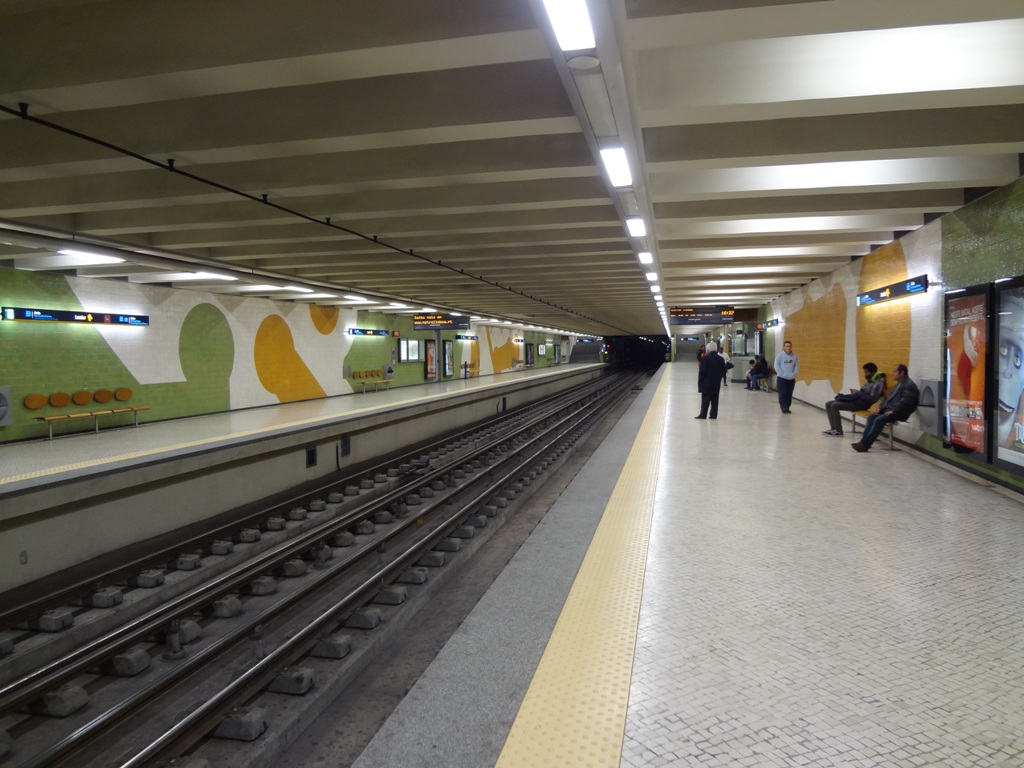

General information
- Location: Estrada da Torre, Lisbon; Portugal
- Coordinates: 38°46′22″N 9°9′35″W
- Owner: Government-owned corporation
- Operator: Metropolitano de Lisboa, EPE
- Line: Yellow Line
- Platforms: 2 side platforms
- Tracks: 2

Construction
- Structure type: Underground
- Accessible: Yes
- Architect: Dinis Gomes

Other information
- Station code: LU
- Fare zone: L

History
- Opened: 27 March 2004 (22 years ago)

Services
Preceding station	Lisbon Metro	Following station
Ameixoeira towards Odivelas	Yellow Line	Quinta das Conchas towards Rato
Route map
Location

Lumiar station is part of the Yellow Line of the Lisbon Metro, serving the Lumiar neighbourhood, close to Lisbon airport.

== History ==
The station opened on 17 March 2004, along with Odivelas, Senhor Roubado, Ameixoeira and Quinta das Conchas stations, and is located on Estrada da Torre.

The architectural design of the station is by Dinis Gomes.

== Connections ==
=== Urban Buses ===
==== Carris ====
- 206 Cais do Sodré ⇄ Senhor Roubado (Metro) (morning service)
- 207 Cais do Sodré ⇄ Fetais (morning service)
- 703 Charneca ⇄ Bairro de Santa Cruz
- 717 Praça do Chile ⇄ Fetais
- 736 Cais do Sodré ⇄ Odivelas (Bairro Dr. Lima Pimentel)
- 796 Campo Grande (Metro) ⇄ Galinheiras

=== Autocarros Suburbanos ===
==== Rodoviária de Lisboa ====
- 201 Lisboa (Campo Grande) ⇄ Caneças (Escola Secundária)
- 300 Lisboa (Campo Grande) ⇄ Sacavém (Praça da República)
- 311 Lisboa (Campo Grande) ⇄ Bairro das Coroas (Alto do Moinho)
- 312 Lisboa (Campo Grande) circulação via Charneca
- 313 Lisboa (Campo Grande) circulação via Sacavém
- 331 Lisboa (Campo Grande) ⇄ Bucelas
- 335 Lisboa (Campo Grande) ⇄ Bucelas via Fanhões
- 336 Lisboa (Campo Grande) ⇄ Bucelas via Ribas
- 901 Lisboa (Campo Grande) ⇄ Caneças (Escola Secundária)
- 931 Lisboa (Campo Grande) ⇄ Pontinha (Metro) via Centro Comercial

== See also ==
- List of Lisbon metro stations
