= Senhor Roubado Station =

Metro station in Lisbon, Portugal

Senhor Roubado
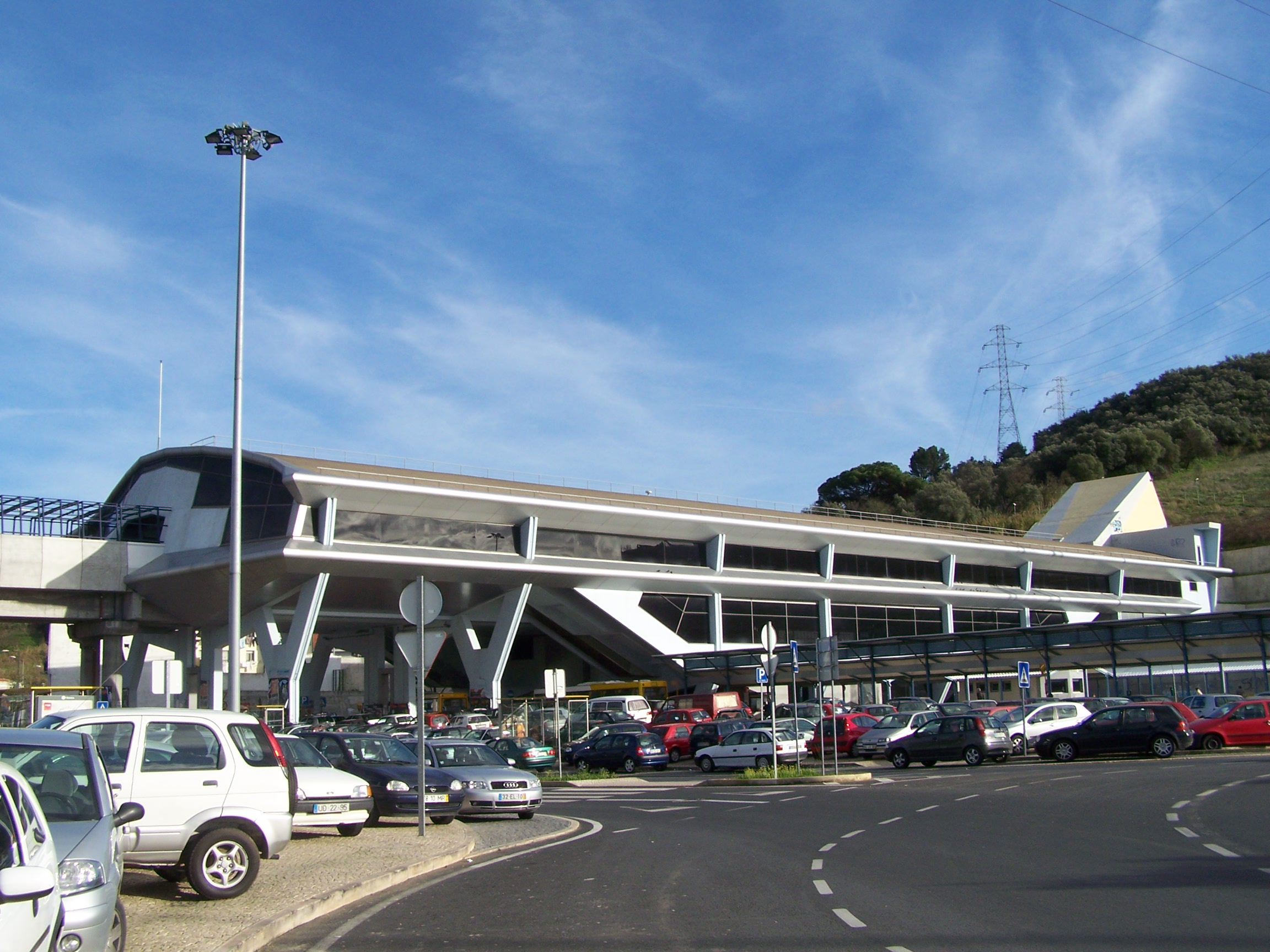

General information
- Location: Rua do Senhor Roubado, Odivelas; Portugal
- Coordinates: 38°47′8″N 9°10′16″W
- Owner: Government-owned corporation
- Operator: Metropolitano de Lisboa, EPE
- Line: Yellow Line
- Platforms: 2 side platforms
- Tracks: 2

Construction
- Structure type: Overground
- Accessible: yes
- Architect: Manuel Bastos

Other information
- Station code: SR
- Fare zone: L/1

History
- Opened: 27 March 2004 (22 years ago)

Services
Preceding station	Lisbon Metro	Following station
Odivelas Terminus	Yellow Line	Ameixoeira towards Rato
Route map
Location

Senhor Roubado station is part of the Yellow Line of the Lisbon Metro.

== History ==
It opened on 27 March 2004 in conjunction with the Odivelas, Ameixoeira, Lumiar and Quinta das Conchas stations, and it is located on Rua do Senhor Roubado. Rather than serving a residential neighbourhood, it is located close to the junction of the N8, A8 and A36 highways, and operates as a park and ride interchange station.

The architectural design of the station is by Manuel Bastos.

== Connections ==
=== Urban buses ===
==== Carris ====
- 206 Cais do Sodré ⇄ Senhor Roubado (dawn service)
- 736 Cais do Sodré ⇄ Odivelas (Bairro Dr. Lima Pimentel)

=== Suburban buses ===
==== Rodoviária de Lisboa ====
- 004 Senhor Roubado (Metro) ⇄ Casal do Bispo
- 201 Lisboa (Campo Grande) ⇄ Caneças (Escola Secundária)
- 202 Senhor Roubado (Metro) ⇄ Montemor
- 205 Pontinha (Metro) ⇄ Senhor Roubado (Metro) via Serra da Luz
- 213 Senhor Roubado (Metro) ⇄ Caneças (Escola Secundária) via Vale do Forno
- 216 Senhor Roubado (Metro) - Circulação via Casal Novo
- 226 Senhor Roubado (Metro) ⇄ Arroja

== See also ==
- List of Lisbon metro stations
