= Carnide Station =

Station on the Lisbon Metro

Carnide
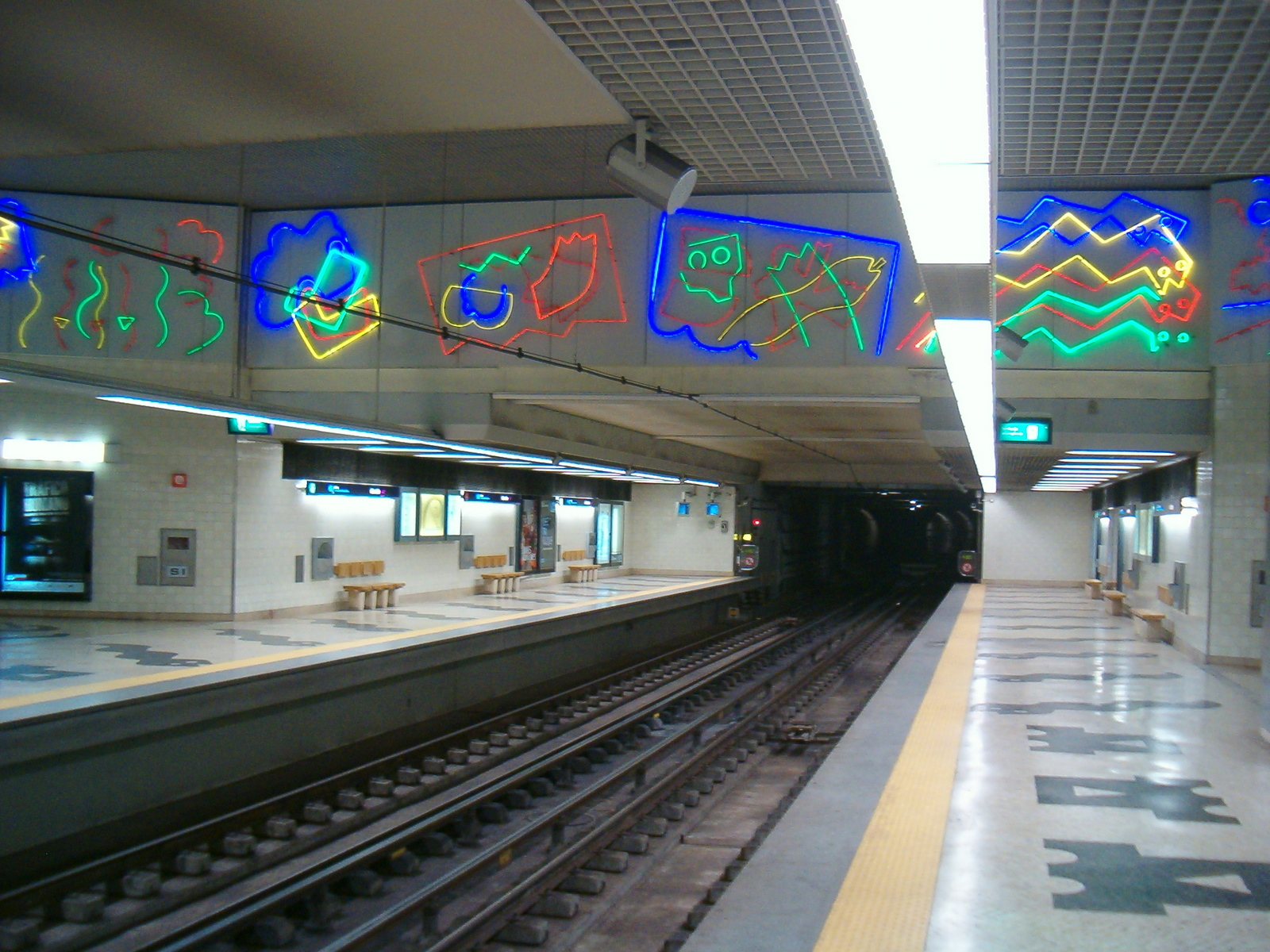

General information
- Location: Avenida Marechal Teixeira Rebelo, Lisbon; Portugal
- Coordinates: 38°45′31″N 9°11′34″W
- Owner: Government-owned corporation
- Operator: Metropolitano de Lisboa, EPE
- Line: Blue Line
- Platforms: 2 side platforms
- Tracks: 2

Construction
- Structure type: Underground
- Accessible: yes
- Architect: José de Guimarães

Other information
- Station code: CA
- Fare zone: L

History
- Opened: October 19, 1997 (28 years ago)

Services
Preceding station	Lisbon Metro	Following station
Pontinha towards Reboleira	Blue Line	Colégio Militar/Luz towards Santa Apolónia
Route map
Location

Carnide station is part of the Blue Line of the Lisbon Metro and is located near the Bairro da Horta Nova neighbourhood of Lisbon.

== History ==
The station opened on October 18, 1997, in conjunction with the Pontinha station, and it is located on Avenida Marechal Teixeira Rebelo, close to Avenida dos Condes de Carnide, from which it takes its name.

The architectural design of the station is by José de Guimarães.

== Connections ==
=== Urban buses ===
==== Carris ====
- 729 Bairro Padre Cruz ⇄ Algés

=== Suburban buses ===
==== Rodoviária de Lisboa ====
- 210 Lisbon (Colégio Militar) ⇄ Caneças (Jardim)

== See also ==
- List of Lisbon metro stations
