= Saldanha Station =

Metro station in Lisbon, Portugal

Saldanha
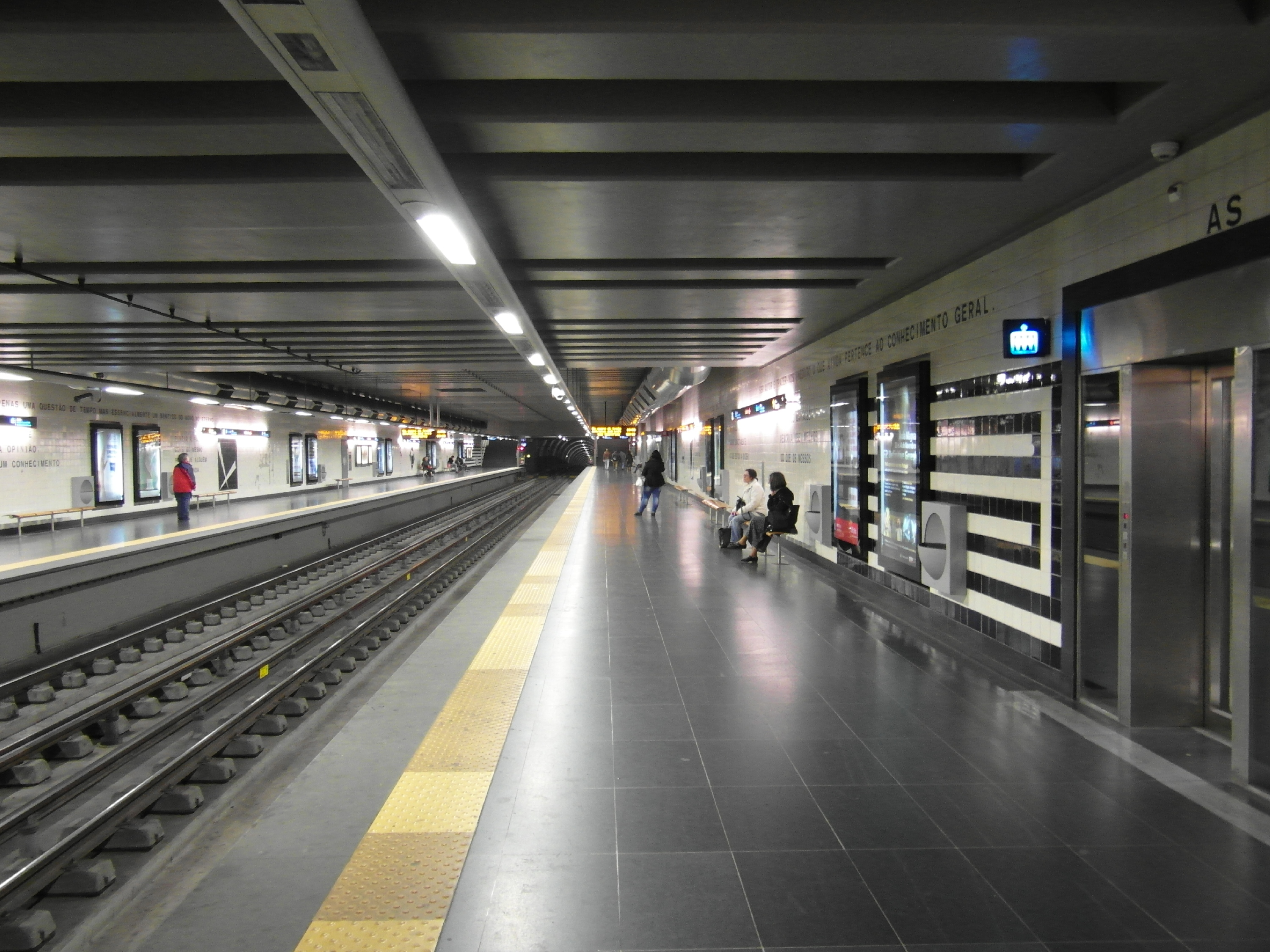
- Red Line Platforms

General information
- Location: Avenida da Republica, Lisbon; Avenida Duque D'Ávila, Lisbon; Portugal
- Coordinates: 38°44′06″N 9°08′43″W
- Owner: Government-owned corporation
- Operator: Metropolitano de Lisboa, EP
- Line: Yellow Line Red Line
- Platforms: 4 side platforms
- Tracks: 4

Construction
- Structure type: Underground
- Accessible: yes
- Architect: Yellow Line: Falcão e Cunha; Red Line: Paulo Brito da Silva

Other information
- Station code: SA
- Fare zone: L

History
- Opened: Yellow Line: 29 December 1959 (66 years ago); Red Line: 29 August 2009 (16 years ago)
- Rebuilt: Yellow Line: 14 March 1977 (49 years ago); Yellow Line: 28 December 1996 (29 years ago); Yellow Line: 17 May 1997 (29 years ago); Yellow Line: 29 August 2009 (16 years ago)

Services
Preceding station	Lisbon Metro	Following station
Campo Pequeno towards Odivelas	Yellow Line	Picoas towards Rato
São Sebastião Terminus	Red Line	Alameda towards Aeroporto
Route map
Location

Saldanha is an interchange station in central Lisbon, where the Red and Yellow Lines of the Lisbon Metro connect.

== History ==
The Yellow Line station is one of the 11 stations that belong to the original Lisbon Metro network, opened on 29 December 1959, and it is located in Praça Duque de Saldanha, which gives the station its name. The architectural design of the original Yellow Line station is by Falcão e Cunha. On 14 March 1977, the Yellow Line station was extended, based on the architectural design of Falcão e Cunha and Sanchez Jorge. On 28 December 1996, the Yellow Line station's northern atrium was refurbished, and on 17 May 1997, the Yellow Line station's southern atrium was also refurbished, both based on the architectural design by Paulo Brito da Silva.

On 29 August 2009 the Red Line station was built, based on the architectural design by Germano Venade and located under Avenida Duque D'Ávila, serving the Avenidas Novas area of the city and the nearby Instituto Superior Técnico. On the same day, the Yellow Line station's northern atrium was again refurbished, based on the architectural design of Paulo Brito da Silva and Sofia Carrilho.

== Connections ==
=== Urban buses ===
==== Carris ====
- 207 Cais do Sodré ⇄ Fetais (morning service)
- 727 Estação Roma-Areeiro ⇄ Restelo – Av. das Descobertas
- 736 Cais do Sodré ⇄ Odivelas (Bairro Dr. Lima Pimentel)
- 738 Quinta dos Barros ⇄ Alto de Santo Amaro
- 744 Marquês de Pombal ⇄ Moscavide (Quinta das Laranjeiras)
- 783 Amoreiras (Centro Comercial) ⇄ Portela – Rua Mouzinho de Albuquerque

==== Aerobus ====
- Linha 2 Aeroporto ⇄ Sete Rios

== See also ==
- List of Lisbon metro stations
