= Picoas station =

Metro station in Lisbon, Portugal

Picoas
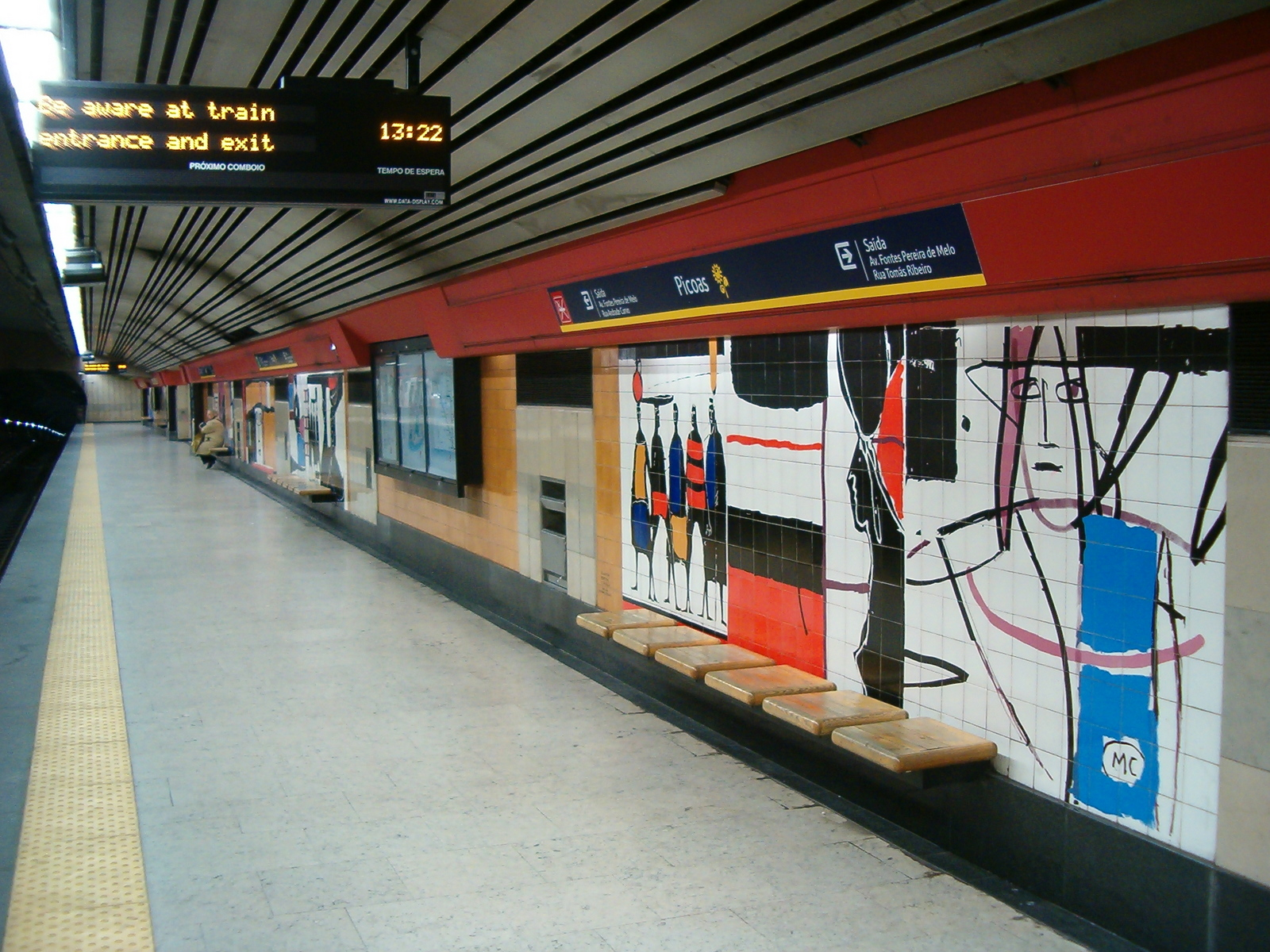

General information
- Location: Avenida Fontes Pereira de Melo, Lisbon; Portugal
- Coordinates: 38°43′52″N 9°8′49″W
- Owner: Government-owned corporation
- Operator: Metropolitano de Lisboa, EPE
- Line: Yellow Line
- Platforms: 2 side platforms
- Tracks: 2

Construction
- Structure type: Underground
- Accessible: No
- Architect: Falcão e Cunha

Other information
- Station code: PI
- Fare zone: L

History
- Opened: 29 December 1959 (66 years ago)
- Rebuilt: 9 November 1982 (43 years ago); 3 April 1995 (31 years ago)

Services
Preceding station	Lisbon Metro	Following station
Saldanha towards Odivelas	Yellow Line	Marquês de Pombal towards Rato
Route map
Location

Picoas station is part of the Yellow Line of the Lisbon Metro, located on the north side of the city centre on Avenida Fontes Pereira de Melo.

== History ==
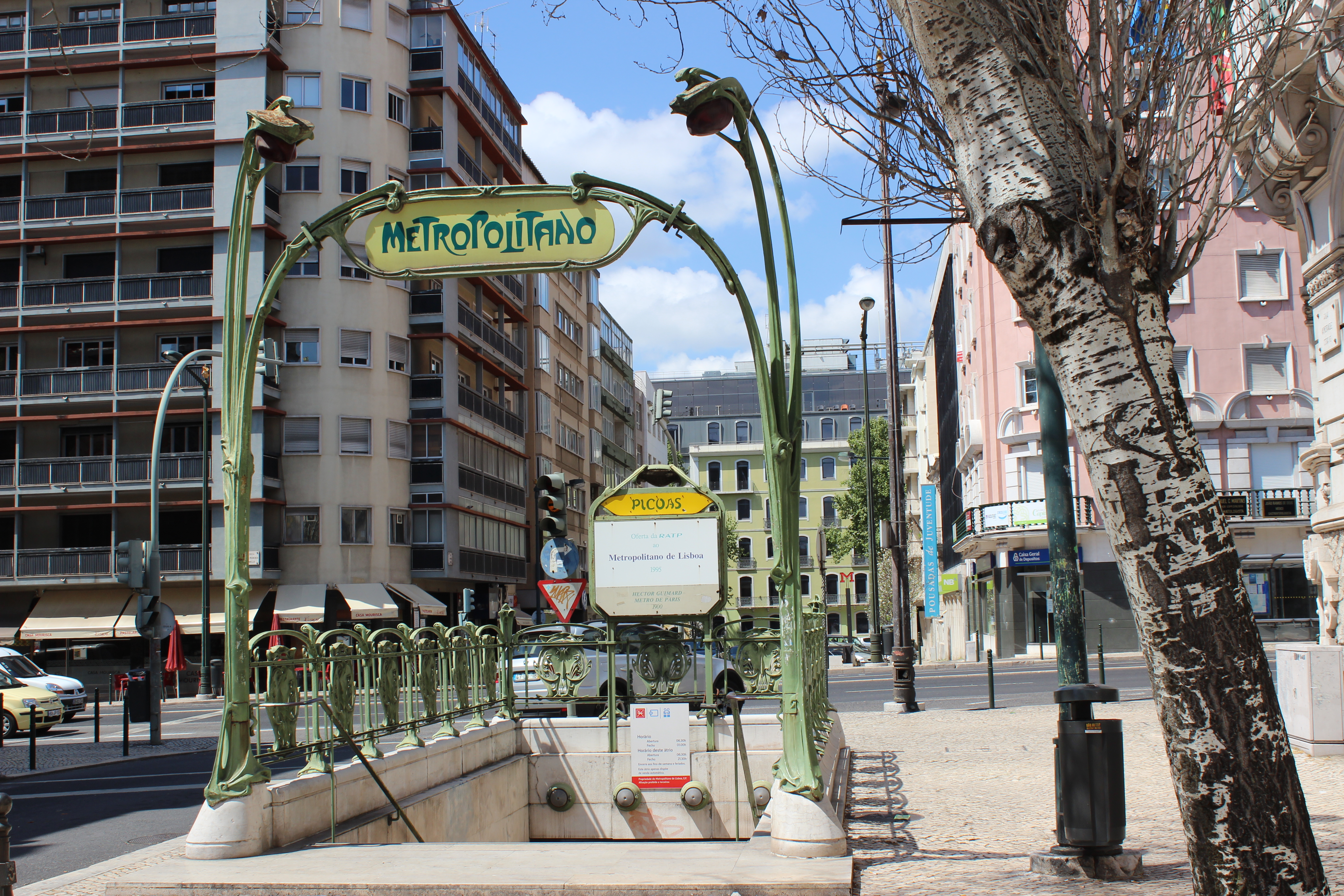
Guimard style entrance

Picoas is one of the 11 stations that belong to the original Lisbon Metro network, opened on 29 December 1959.

The architectural design of the original station is by Falcão e Cunha. On 9 November 1982, the station was extended, based on the architectural design of Benoliel de Carvalho. On 3 April 1995, the station was refurbished, based on the architectural design of Dinis Gomes.

== Connections ==
=== Urban buses ===
==== Carris ====
- 207 Cais do Sodré ⇄ Fetais
- 727 Estação Roma-Areeiro ⇄ Restelo - Av. das Descobertas
- 736 Cais do Sodré ⇄ Odivelas (Bairro Dr. Lima Pimentel)
- 738 Quinta dos Barros ⇄ Alto de Santo Amaro
- 744 Marquês de Pombal ⇄ Moscavide (Quinta das Laranjeiras)
- 783 Amoreiras (Centro Comercial) ⇄ Portela - Rua Mouzinho de Albuquerque

==== Aerobus ====
- Linha 2 Aeroporto ⇄ Sete Rios

== See also ==
- List of Lisbon metro stations
