= Quinta das Conchas Station =

Metro station in Lisbon, Portugal

Quinta das Conchas
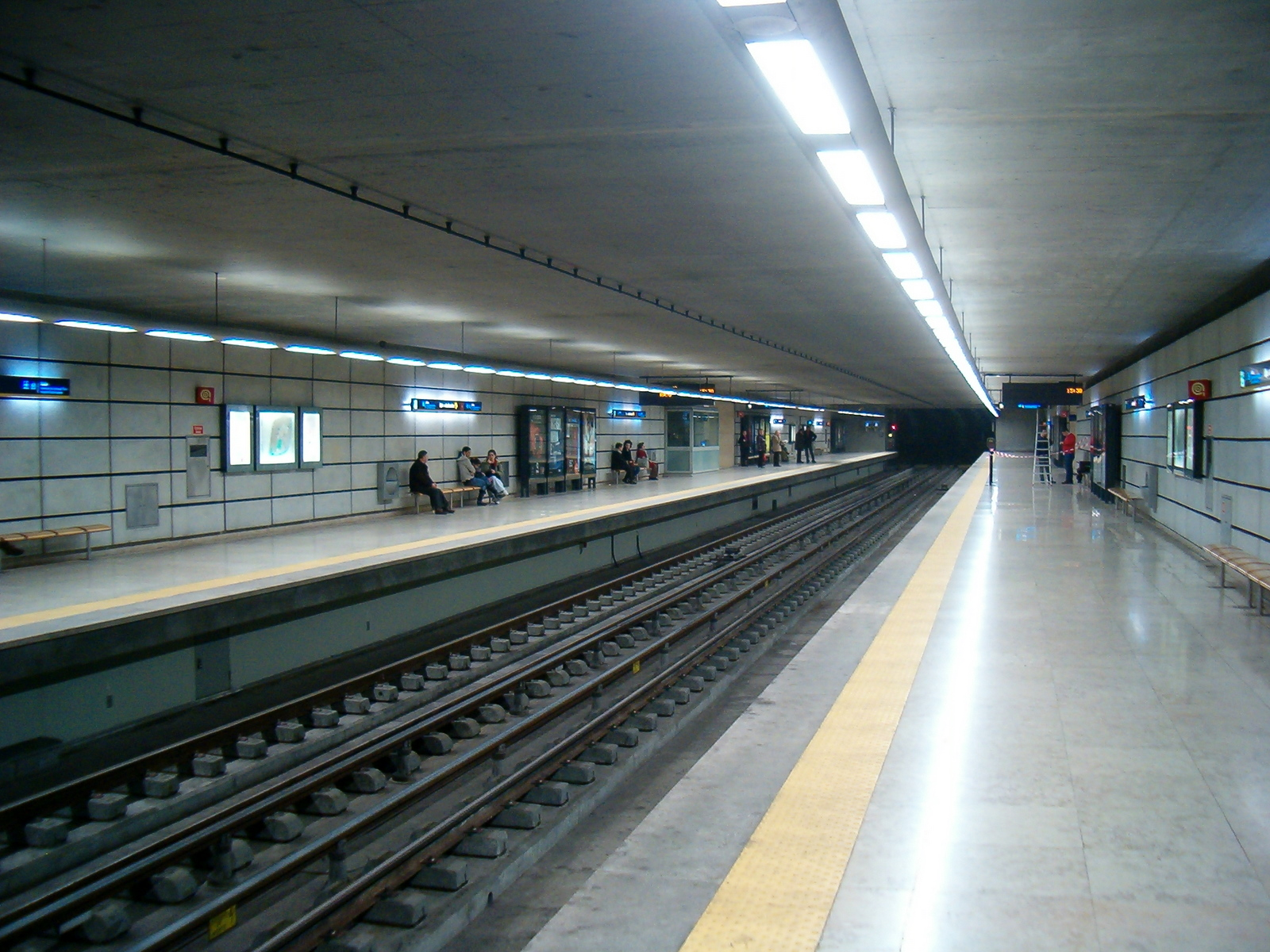

General information
- Location: Rua Tóbis Portuguesa, Lisbon; Portugal
- Coordinates: 38°46′2″N 9°9′20″W
- Owner: Government-owned corporation
- Operator: Metropolitano de Lisboa, EPE
- Line: Yellow Line
- Platforms: 2 side platforms
- Tracks: 2

Construction
- Structure type: Underground
- Accessible: Yes
- Architect: Bartolomeu Costa Cabral, Mário Crespo, João Gomes and Anabela João

Other information
- Station code: QC
- Fare zone: L

History
- Opened: 27 March 2004 (22 years ago)

Services
Preceding station	Lisbon Metro	Following station
Lumiar towards Odivelas	Yellow Line	Campo Grande towards Rato
Route map
Location

Quinta das Conchas station is part of the Yellow Line of the Lisbon Metro, serving the Quinta das Conchas neighbourhood of Lumiar, north east of central Lisbon.

== History ==
It opened on 27 March 2004 in conjunction with the Odivelas, Senhor Roubado, Ameixoeira and Lumiar stations, and it is located on Rua Tóbis Portuguesa .

The architectural design of the station is by Bartolomeu Costa Cabral, Mário Crespo, João Gomes and Anabela João.

== Connections ==
=== Urban buses ===
==== Carris ====
- 798 Campo Grande (Metro) ⇄ Galinheiras

== See also ==
- List of Lisbon metro stations
