= Ameixoeira Station =

Metro station in Lisbon, Portugal

Ameixoeira
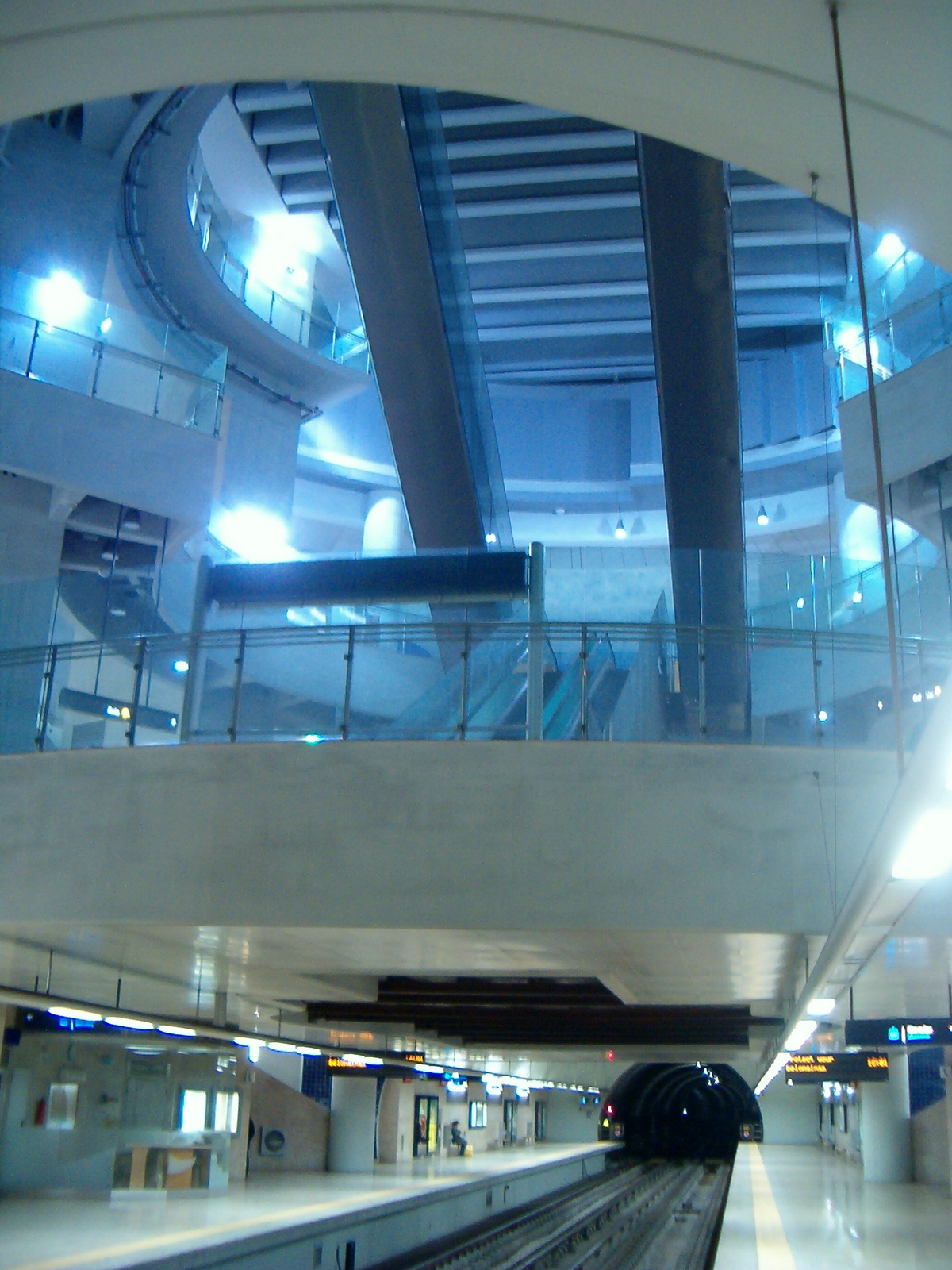

General information
- Location: Azinhaga da Cidade, Lisbon; Portugal
- Coordinates: 38°47′8″N 9°10′16″W
- Owner: Government-owned corporation
- Operator: Metropolitano de Lisboa, EPE
- Line: Yellow Line
- Platforms: 2 side platforms
- Tracks: 2

Construction
- Structure type: Underground
- Accessible: yes
- Architect: Robert Mac Fadden

Other information
- Station code: AX
- Fare zone: L

History
- Opened: 27 March 2004 (22 years ago)

Services
| Preceding station | Lisbon Metro | Following station |
|---|---|---|
| Senhor Roubado towards Odivelas | Yellow Line | Lumiar towards Rato |
Route map
Location

Ameixoeira station is part of the Yellow Line of the Lisbon Metro.

== History ==
It opened on 27 March 2004 in conjunction with the Odivelas, Senhor Roubado, Lumiar and Quinta das Conchas stations, and it is located on Azinhaga da Cidade. It takes its name from the nearby Jardim da Ameixoeira park.

The architectural design of the station is by Robert Mac Fadden.

== Connections ==
=== Urban buses ===
==== Carris ====
- 703 Charneca ⇄ Bairro de Santa Cruz

== See also ==
- List of Lisbon metro stations
