= Lisbon Metro Yellow Line =

Metro line in Lisbon, Portugal

Yellow Line
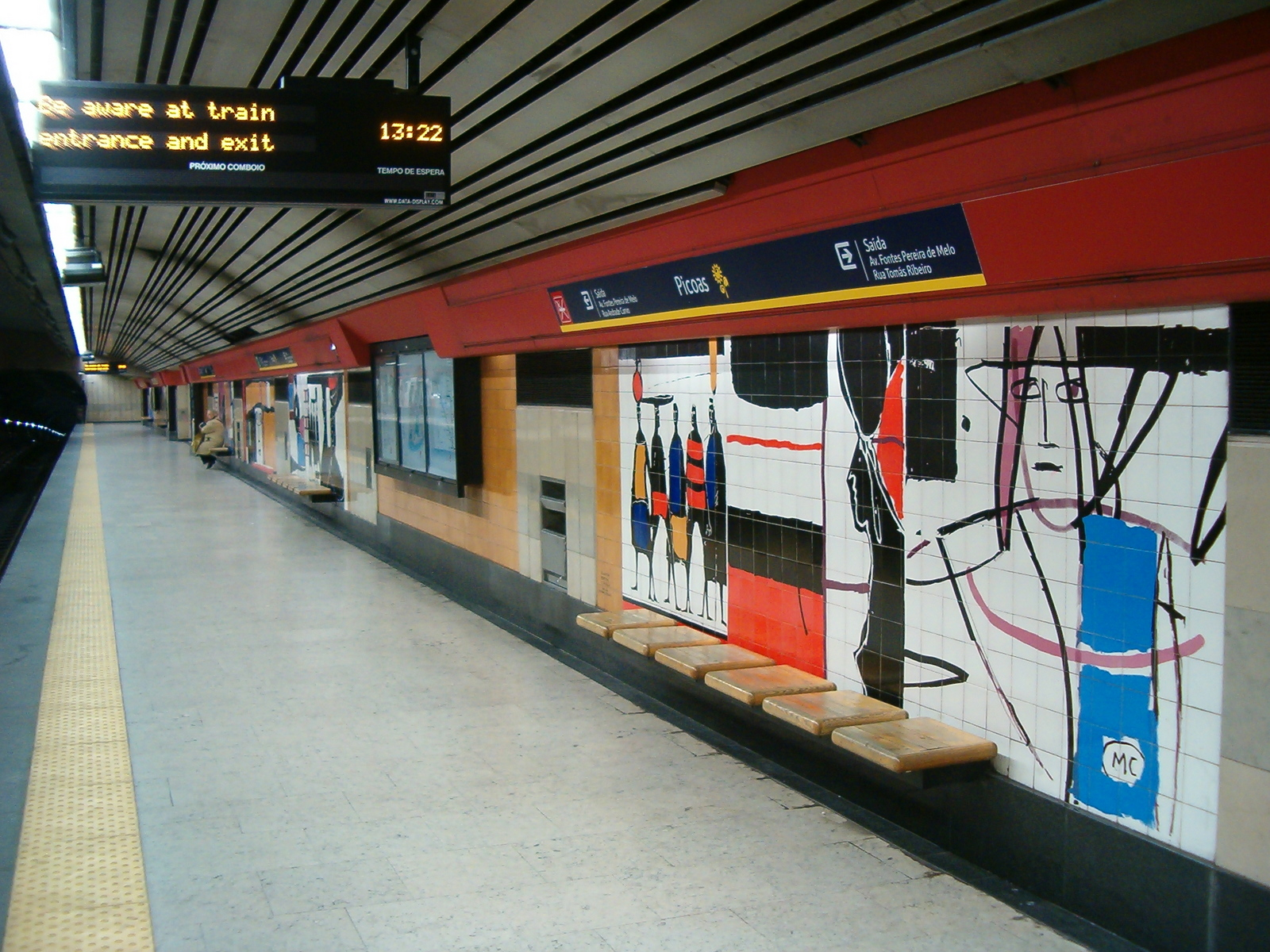
- Lisbon metro station Picoas

Overview
- Other name: Sunflower Line
- Native name: Linha Amarela
- Owner: Government-owned corporation
- Locale: Lisbon, Portugal
- Termini: Odivelas; Rato
- Connecting lines: Red Line Green Line Blue Line
- Stations: 13

Service
- Type: Rapid Transit
- System: Metropolitano de Lisboa
- Operator(s): Metropolitano de Lisboa, EPE
- Rolling stock: ML90, ML95, ML97, ML99

History
- Opened: December 29, 1959 (66 years ago)
- Last extension: 2004

Technical
- Line length: 11 km (6.8 mi)
- Character: Underground subway
- Track gauge: 1,435 mm (4 ft 8 1/2 in) standard gauge
- Electrification: 750 V DC third rail
Route map
Topographic map

The Yellow Line (Portuguese: Linha Amarela) or Sunflower Line (Portuguese: Linha do Girassol) is one of the four lines of Lisbon Metro.

== Stations ==
Code	Station name	Distance (km)		Transfers	Location	
Code	Station name	Inter- station	Total	Transfers	Location	
OD	Odivelas	—N/a	0.0		Odivelas	Odivelas
SR	Senhor Roubado	1.0	1.0	Senhor Roubado bus terminal	Odivelas	Odivelas
AX	Ameixoeira	1.7	2.7		Santa Clara	Lisbon
LU	Lumiar	0.9	3.6		Lumiar	Lisbon
QC	Quinta das Conchas	1.0	4.6		Olivais	Lisbon
CG	Campo Grande	0.9	5.5	Green Line; Campo Grande bus terminal	Alvalade	Lisbon
CU	Cidade Universitária	0.8	6.3		Alvalade	Lisbon
EC	Entre Campos	1.1	7.4	Sintra Line/Fertagus (Entrecampos)	Alvalade	Lisbon
CP	Campo Pequeno	0.7	8.1		Avenidas Novas	Lisbon
SL	Saldanha	0.7	8.8	Red Line	Avenidas Novas	Lisbon
PC	Picoas	0.7	9.5		Avenidas Novas	Lisbon
MP	Marquês de Pombal	0.7	10.2	Blue Line; Rotunda bus terminal	Avenidas Novas	Lisbon
RA	Rato	0.7	10.9		Santo António	Lisbon

Odivelas
Senhor Roubado
Ameixoeira
Lumiar
Quinta das Conchas
Campo Grande
Cidade Universitária
Entre Campos
Campo Pequeno
Saldanha
Picoas
Marquês de Pombal
Rato

== Frequency ==
	Summer timetable		Winter timetable	
	Time	Headway	Time	Headway
Working days	06:30 - 07:20 07:20 - 09:30 09:30 - 16:40 16:40 - 20:00 20:00 - 20:30 20:30 - 22:30 22:30 - 01:05	07' 50" 05' 05" 07' 50" 06' 10" 07' 40" 07' 25" 10' 20"	06:30 - 07:15 07:15 - 09:30 09:30 - 10:00 10:00 - 16:40 10:00 - 16:40 16:40 - 17:30 17:30 - 19:00 19:00 - 19:30 19:30 - 20:00 20:00 - 21:00 21:00 - 22:00 22:00 - 01:05	07' 50" 04' 20" 05' 00" 05' 50"_{*} 11' 40"_{**} 04' 40" 04' 45" 06' 10" 06' 50" 08' 55" 08' 45" 10' 30"
Weekends and holidays	06:30 - 07:30 07:30 - 20:30 20:30 - 01:05	08' 40' 08' 45' 10' 25'	6:30 - 07:30 07:30 - 20:30 20:30 - 01:05	08' 40' 08' 45' 10' 25'

_{*}Rato - Campo Grande
_{**}Campo Grande - Odivelas

== Chronology ==
- December 29, 1959: Opening of the original Lisbon Metro network with a Y shape. Common branch stations: Restauradores, Avenida, Rotunda (former name of the Marquês de Pombal station and where the line would split into the two branches). Current Blue Line branch stations (coming from Rotunda station): Parque, São Sebastião, Palhavã (former name of the Praça de Espanha station) and Sete Rios (former name of the Jardim Zoológico station). Current Yellow Line branch stations (coming from Rotunda station): Picoas, Saldanha, Campo Pequeno and Entre Campos.
- January 27, 1963: Opening of the Rossio station. Main branch route: Restauradores - Rossio.
- September 28, 1966: Opening of the Socorro (former name of the Martim Moniz station), Intendente and Anjos stations. Main branch route: Restauradores - Anjos.
- June 18, 1972: Opening of the Arroios, Alameda, Areeiro, Roma and Alvalade stations. Main branch route: Restauradores - Alvalade.
- October 15, 1988: Opening of the Cidade Universitária, Laranjeiras, Alto dos Moinhos and Colégio Militar/Luz stations. Current Blue Line branch route: Rotunda - Colégio Militar/Luz. Current Yellow Line branch route: Rotunda - Cidade Universitária.
- April 3, 1993: Opening of the Campo Grande station. Main branch route: Restauradores - Campo Grande. Current Yellow Line branch route: Rotunda - Campo Grande.
- July 15, 1995: Creation of the Blue and Yellow lines by building a second Rotunda station. New Yellow line route: Rotunda - Campo Grande.
- December 29, 1997: Opening of the Rato station. Line route: Rato - Campo Grande.
- March 1, 1998: Rotunda station is renamed to Marquês de Pombal.
- March 27, 2004: Opening of the Quinta das Conchas, Lumiar, Ameixoeira, Senhor Roubado and Odivelas stations. Line route: Rato - Odivelas.

== Future ==
- Plans are in place to extend the Yellow Line with two new stations (Santos and Estrela), connecting the Green Line on Cais do Sodré to the Yellow Line on Rato and creating a circle line with the merge of these two lines. Construction on this extension started in April, 2021.

== See also ==
- List of Lisbon metro stations
