= LisboaViva =

Contactless smartcard

Lisboa VIVA is a contactless smartcard used for electronic ticketing as part of the transportation system of Lisbon metropolitan area. It is in use on the Lisbon Metro and mandatory on Carris since 2004. The system was provided by Thales.

== Use ==
The card is scanned at the black circle on the reader, at up to 5 cm. A beep will be heard, and a light will show. If the season ticket is valid, there is a short sound and a green light; if not, there is a longer sound and the light shows red.
