= Pontinha Station =

Lisbon metro station

Pontinha
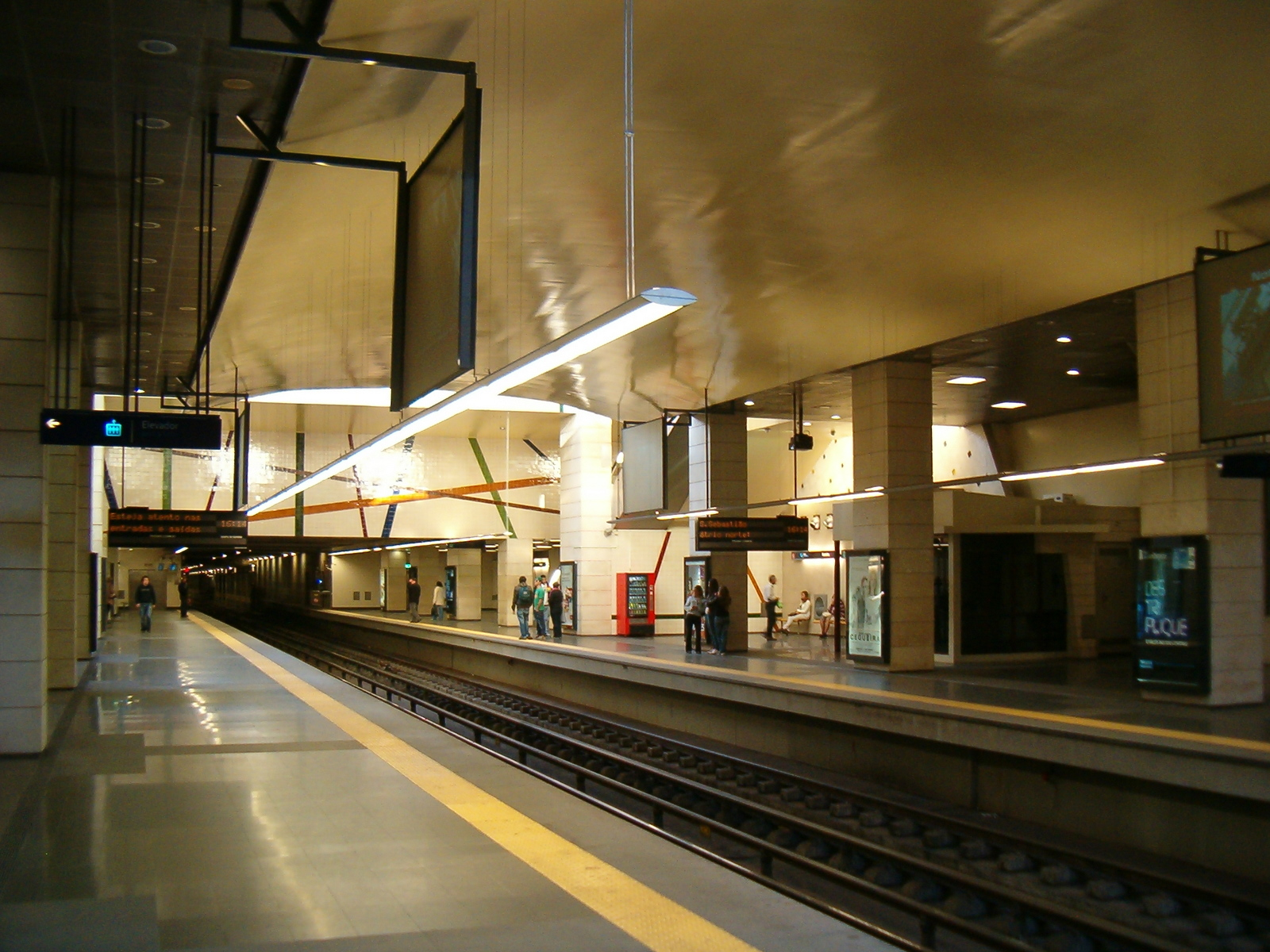

General information
- Location: Estrada Militar à Pontinha, Amadora; Portugal
- Coordinates: 38°45′42″N 9°11′48″W
- Owner: Government-owned corporation
- Operator: Metropolitano de Lisboa, EPE
- Line: Blue Line
- Platforms: 2 side platforms
- Tracks: 2

Construction
- Structure type: Underground
- Accessible: yes
- Architect: Ana Nascimento

Other information
- Station code: PO
- Fare zone: L/1

History
- Opened: October 19, 1997 (28 years ago)

Services
Preceding station	Lisbon Metro	Following station
Alfornelos towards Reboleira	Blue Line	Carnide towards Santa Apolónia
Route map
Location

Pontinha station is part of the Blue Line of the Lisbon Metro and is located in the Bairro Mário Madeira neighbourhood of Lisbon, near the border with Amadora and Odivelas.

== History ==
The station opened on October 18, 1997, in conjunction with the Carnide station, and it is located on Estrada Militar da Pontinha from which it takes its name. An important bus terminal is built over it.

The architectural design of the station is by Ana Nascimento.

== Connections ==
=== Urban Buses ===
==== Carris ====
- 724 Alcântara - Calçada da Tapada ⇄ Pontinha
- 726 Sapadores ⇄ Pontinha Centro
- 729 Bairro Padre Cruz ⇄ Algés
- 747 Campo Grande (Metro) ⇄ Pontinha (Metro)
- 768 Cidade Universitária ⇄ Quinta dos Alcoutins

=== Suburban Buses ===
==== Rodoviária de Lisboa ====
- 203 Pontinha (Metro) ⇄ Casal do Bispo
- 205 Pontinha (Metro) ⇄ Sr Roubado (Metro) via Serra da Luz
- 206 Pontinha (Metro) ⇄ Loures (Centro Comercial)
- 210 Lisboa (Colégio Militar) ⇄ Caneças (Jardim)
- 222 Pontinha (Metro) ⇄ Pedernais (Bairro do Girasol)
- 223 Pontinha (Metro) ⇄ Casal Novo
- 224 Pontinha (Metro) ⇄ Caneças (Esc Secundária) via Serra da Helena
- 227 Pontinha (Metro) ⇄ Vale Grande
- 228 Pontinha (Metro) ⇄ Jardim da Amoreira
- 231 Pontinha (Metro) ⇄ Caneças (Qta São Carlos) via Centro Comercial
- 236 Pontinha (Metro) ⇄ Casal Novo via Casal do Bispo
- 905 Pontinha (Metro) ⇄ Odivelas (Metro) via Serra da Luz
- 931 Lisboa (Campo Grande) ⇄ Pontinha (Metro) via Centro Comercial

=== Vimeca / Lisboa Transportes ===
- 128 Casal da Mira (Dolce Vita Tejo) ⇄ Lisboa (Colégio Militar)
- 143 Amadora (Estação Norte) ⇄ Pontinha (Estação)
- 155 Amadora (Hospital) - Circulação

== See also ==
- List of Lisbon metro stations
