= Odivelas Station =

Metro station in Lisbon, Portugal

Odivelas
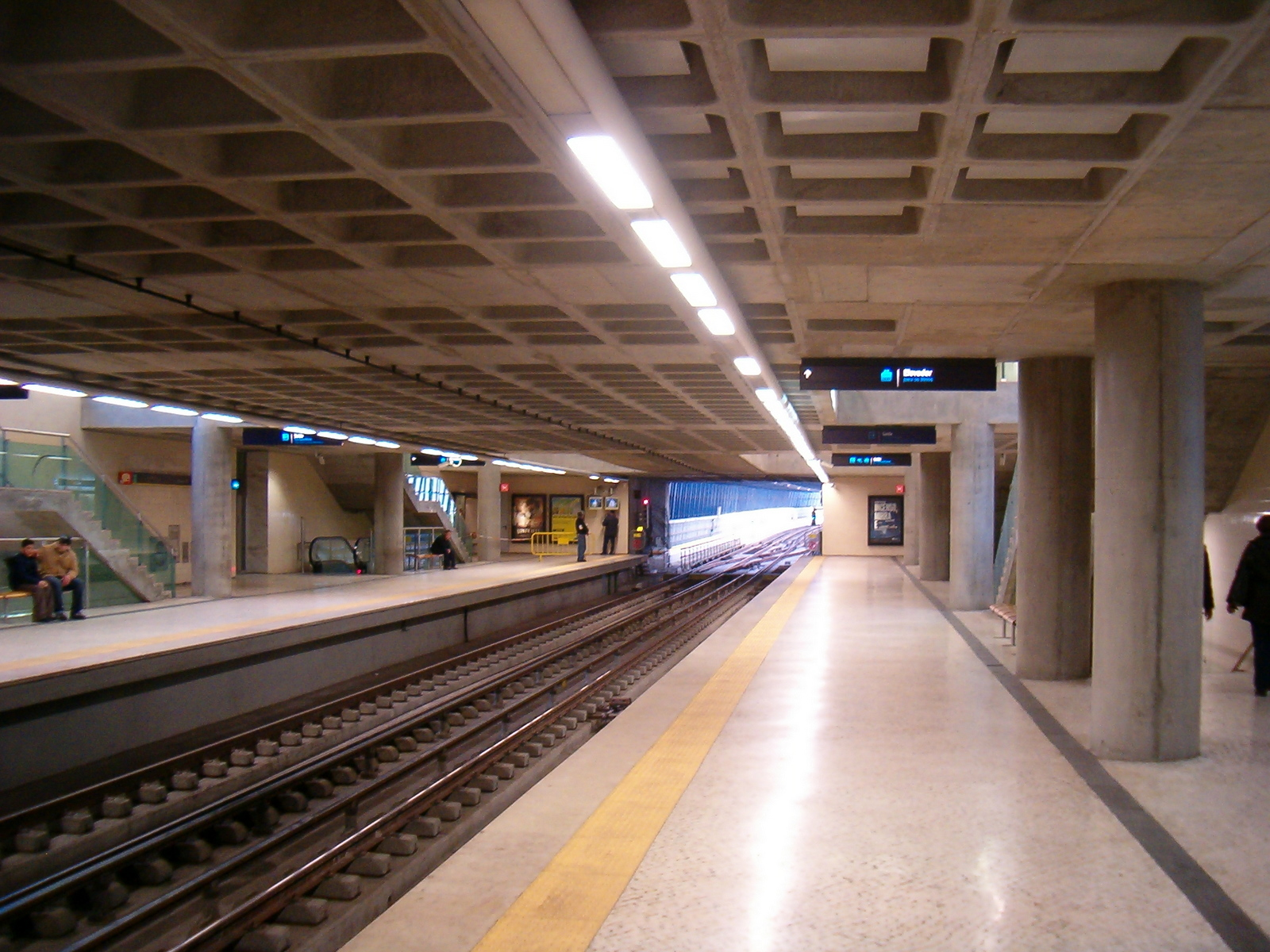

General information
- Location: Rua Professor Doutor Egas Moniz, Odivelas; Portugal
- Coordinates: 38°47′35″N 9°10′22″W
- Owner: Government-owned corporation
- Operator: Metropolitano de Lisboa, EPE
- Line: Yellow Line
- Platforms: 2 side platforms
- Tracks: 2

Construction
- Structure type: At grade
- Accessible: yes
- Architect: Paulo Brito da Silva

Other information
- Station code: OD
- Fare zone: 1

History
- Opened: 27 March 2004 (22 years ago)

Services
| Preceding station | Lisbon Metro | Following station |
|---|---|---|
| Terminus | Yellow Line | Senhor Roubado towards Rato |
Route map
Location

Odivelas station is the northern terminus on the Yellow Line of the Lisbon Metro in the Odivelas neighbourhood, north west of central Lisbon.

== History ==
The station opened on 27 March 2004 in conjunction with the Senhor Roubado, Ameixoeira, Lumiar and Quinta das Conchas stations, and it is located on Rua Professor Doutor Egas Moniz.

The architectural design of the station is by Paulo Brito da Silva.

== Connections ==
=== Suburban Buses ===
==== Rodoviária de Lisboa ====
- 001 Odivelas (Metro) - circulação via Casal do Chapim
- 003 Odivelas (Metro) - circulação via Arroja
- 206 Pontinha (Metro) ⇄ Senhor Roubado (Metro) via Serra da Luz
- 207 Odivelas (Metro) - circulação via Sete Castelos
- 208 Arroja - circulação via Odivelas (Metro)
- 209 Arroja - circulação via Patameiras (Centro Comercial)
- 211 Odivelas (Metro) ⇄ Ramada (Bairro dos Bons Dias)
- 214 Odivelas (Metro) ⇄ Casal da Paradela
- 225 Odivelas (Metro) ⇄ Loures (Hospital Beatriz Angelo)
- 228 Pontinha (Metro) ⇄ Jardim da Amoreira
- 229 Odivelas (Metro) - circulação via Colinas do Cruzeiro
- 230 Odivelas (Metro) ⇄ Casal de Cambra (Centro de Saúde)
- 235 Odivelas (Metro) ⇄ Casal da Paradela
- 237 Odivelas (Odivelas Parque) - circulação via Odivelas (Metro)
- 238 Odivelas (Metro) ⇄ Loures (IKEA)
- 240 Olival Basto - circulação via Póvoa de Santo Adrião
- 335 Lisboa (Campo Grande) ⇄ Bucelas via Fanhões
- 337 Lisboa (Campo Grande) ⇄ Tojal
- 365 Odivelas ⇄ Loures (Centro Comercial)
- 901 Lisboa (Campo Grande) ⇄ Caneças (Escola Secundária)
- 905 Pontinha (Metro) ⇄ Odivelas (Metro) via Serra da Luz
- 913 Odivelas (Metro) ⇄ Caneças (Escola Secundária) via Patameiras
- 916 Odivelas (Metro) - circulalção via Casal Novo
- 925 Odivelas (Metro) ⇄ Loures (Hospital Beatriz Angelo) via Jardim da Amoreira
- 926 Odivelas (Metro) ⇄ Arroja
- 931 Lisboa (Campo Grande) ⇄ Pontinha (Metro) via Centro Comercial
- 934 Odivelas (Metro) ⇄ Montemor

== See also ==
- List of Lisbon metro stations
