= Campo Grande Station =

Metro station in Lisbon, Portugal

Campo Grande
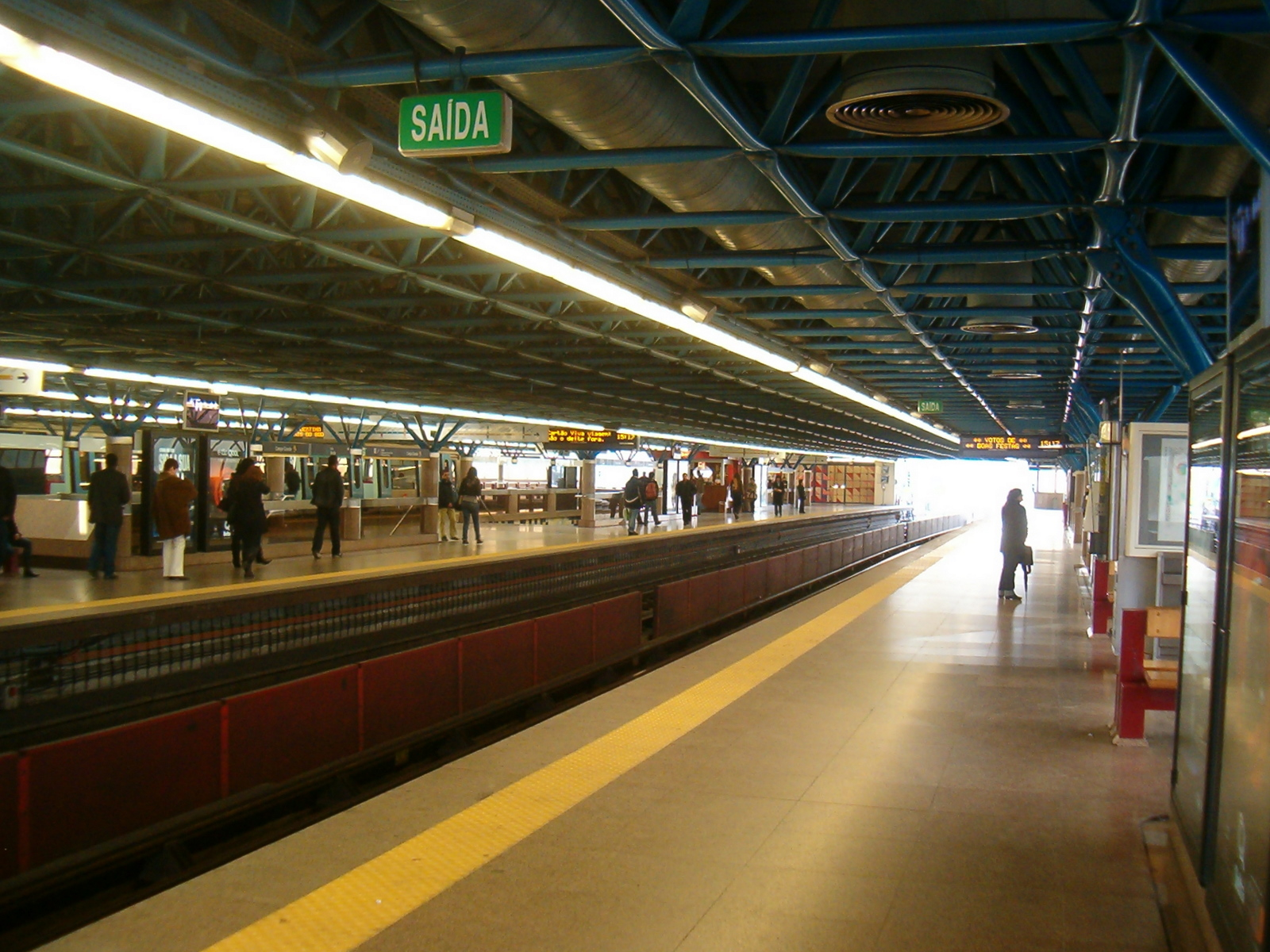

General information
- Location: Rua Cipriano Dourado, Lisbon; Portugal
- Coordinates: 38°45′37″N 9°09′28″W
- Owner: Government-owned corporation
- Operator: Metropolitano de Lisboa, EPE
- Line: Yellow Line Green Line
- Platforms: Central island platform and two side platforms
- Tracks: 4
- Connections: Bus interchange

Construction
- Structure type: Overground
- Accessible: Partial (cross-platform transfers only)
- Architect: Ezequiel Nicolau

Other information
- Station code: CG
- Fare zone: L

History
- Opened: 3 April 1993 (33 years ago)

Services
Preceding station	Lisbon Metro	Following station
Quinta das Conchas towards Odivelas	Yellow Line	Cidade Universitária towards Rato
Telheiras Terminus	Green Line	Alvalade towards Cais do Sodré
Future service
Cidade Universitária towards Cais do Sodré via Marquês de Pombal	Green Line	Alvalade towards Cais do Sodré via Martim Moniz
Quinta das Conchas towards Odivelas	Yellow Line	Telheiras Terminus
Route map
Location

Campo Grande is an elevated interchange station on the Yellow and Green Lines of the Lisbon Metro. It has a large bus terminal at ground level and is located on Rua Cipriano Dourado just north of Avenida General Norton de Matos in the Lisbon parish of Alvalade, in the neighbourhood of Campo Grande.

== Location ==
The station adjoins Estádio José Alvalade home of Sporting Clube de Portugal. Nearby destinations include Pimenta Palace, Rafael Bordalo Pinheiro Museum, Universidade Lusófona and northern access to the Faculty of Sciences, University of Lisbon.

== History ==
The station opened on 1 April 1993.

The architectural design is by Ezequiel Nicolau with murals and art installations by Eduardo Nery. The station is not fully accessible for people with physical disabilities.

== Connections ==
=== Urban buses ===
==== Carris ====
- 207 Cais do Sodré ⇄ Fetais (morning service)
- 701 Campo Grande (Metro) ⇄ Campo de Ourique (Prazeres)
- 717 Praça do Chile ⇄ Fetais
- 736 Cais do Sodré ⇄ Odivelas (Bairro Dr. Lima Pimentel)
- 747 Campo Grande (Metro) ⇄ Pontinha (Metro)
- 750 Estação Oriente (Interface) ⇄ Algés
- 767 Campo Mártires da Pátria ⇄ Reboleira (Metro)
- 778 Campo Grande (Metro) ⇄ Paço do Lumiar
- 796 Campo Grande (Metro) ⇄ Galinheiras
- 798 Campo Grande (Metro) ⇄ Galinheiras

=== Suburban buses ===
==== Rodoviária de Lisboa ====
- 201 Campo Grande (Metro) ⇄ Caneças (Escola Secundária)
- 300 Campo Grande (Metro) ⇄ Sacavém (Praça da República)
- 311 Campo Grande (Metro) ⇄ Bairro das Coroas (Alto do Moinho)
- 312 Campo Grande (Metro) circulação via Charneca
- 313 Campo Grande (Metro) circulação via Sacavém
- 315 Campo Grande (Metro) circulação via Bairro da Bogalheira
- 329 Campo Grande (Metro) ⇄ Quinta da Piedade
- 331 Campo Grande (Metro) ⇄ Bucelas
- 333 Campo Grande (Metro) ⇄ Zambujal
- 334 Campo Grande (Metro) ⇄ Infantado
- 335 Campo Grande (Metro) ⇄ Bucelas via Fanhões
- 336 Campo Grande (Metro) ⇄ Bucelas via Ribas
- 337 Campo Grande (Metro) ⇄ Tojal
- 344 Campo Grande (Metro) ⇄ Bucelas
- 353 Campo Grande (Metro) ⇄ Vialonga (Quinta da Maranhota)
- 354 Campo Grande (Metro) ⇄ Vialonga (Quinta da Maranhota via Infantado
- 901 Campo Grande (Metro) ⇄ Caneças (Escola Secundária)
- 931 Campo Grande (Metro) ⇄ Pontinha (Metro) via Centro Comercial

== See also ==
- List of Lisbon metro stations
