= Lisbon Metro =

Rapid transit system in Lisbon, Portugal

Overview
- Native name: Metro de Lisboa
- Owner: Government-owned corporation
- Locale: Lisbon-Amadora-Odivelas-Loures, Portugal
- Transit type: Rapid transit
- Number of lines: 4
- Number of stations: 56
- Daily ridership: 484,000 (2024 daily average)
- Annual ridership: 176.73 million (2024)
- Headquarters: Fontes Pereira de Melo 28-28A
- Website: www.metrolisboa.pt

Operation
- Began operation: 29 December 1959; 66 years ago
- Operators: Metropolitano de Lisboa, EPE
- Number of vehicles: 113 3-car trainsets
- Headway: Peak hours: 3–5 minutes Off-peak: 5–10 minutes

Technical
- System length: 44.5 km (27.7 mi)
- Track gauge: 1,435 mm (4 ft 8 1/2 in) standard gauge
- Electrification: 750 V DC third rail
- Top speed: 60 km/h (37 mph)

The Lisbon Metro (Portuguese: Metro de Lisboa) is a rapid transit system in Lisbon, Portugal. Opened in December 1959, it was the first rapid transit system in Portugal. As of 2023, the system's four lines total 44.5 kilometres (27.7 mi) of route and serve 56 stations.

== History ==
=== Initial plans ===
The idea of building a system of underground railways for the city of Lisbon first arose in 1888. It was first proposed by Henrique de Lima e Cunha, a military engineer who had published a proposal in the journal Obras Públicas e Minas (Public Works and Mines) for a network with several lines that could serve the Portuguese capital. Concrete plans took longer to evolve, though. Lanoel Aussenac d'Abel and Abel Coelho presented theirs in 1923, and José Manteca Roger and Juan Luque Argenti theirs one year later, in 1924. None of these plans were carried out.

After World War II, in which Portugal remained neutral, the national economy took off and the financial possibilities arising from the Marshall Plan provided a strong boost to the potential construction of a metro in Lisbon. A society was formed on 26 January 1948 with the purpose of studying the technical and economic feasibility of the project.

=== 1955–1979: Beginning of operations ===
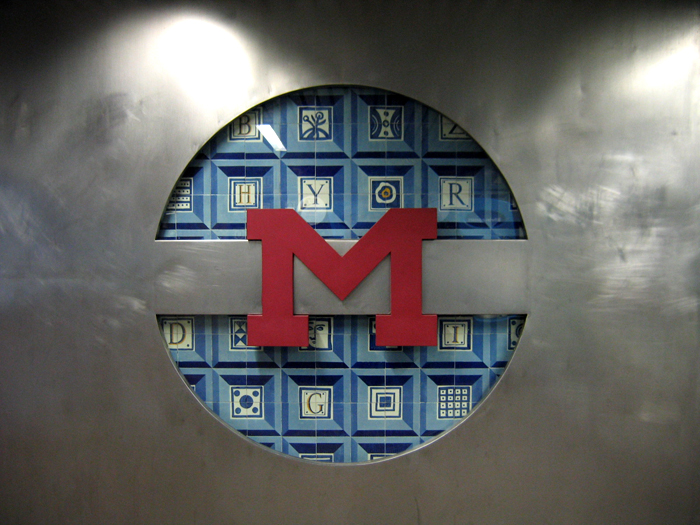
Old Lisbon Metro logo at Colégio Militar/Luz station

Construction began on 7 August 1955, and four years later, on 29 December 1959, the Lisbon Metro was inaugurated. The network was formed by a Y-shaped line linking Restauradores to Rotunda (now Marquês de Pombal), branching then to Entre Campos and to Sete Rios (now Jardim Zoológico), where the rolling stock depot (PMO I) which was also linked to the outer-loop Cintura Line of CP was located. Two services were operated on the system: one between Restauradores and Sete Rios (which later became part of the Blue Line), and one between Restauradores and Entre Campos (which later became part of the Yellow Line).

The new system was well received by the public, and in the first year the Metro carried more than 15.3 million passengers. The metro has proved an important factor in urban development of the city, outlining new areas of housing and services. On 27 January 1963, the first phase of the central portion of the network (later the Green Line) opened with an extension from Restauradores to Rossio; the second phase (from Rossio to Anjos) opened on 28 September 1966 and the third phase (from Anjos to Alvalade) opened on 18 June 1972.

After this first extension, no further extensions began construction until the early 1980s. In 1974, after the Carnation Revolution, the management model was changed, being nationalized in 1975 and renamed Metropolitano de Lisboa, EP in 1978. Under the new management, works were carried to enlarge platforms, originally designed to receive two cars, so that these could receive four cars.

Lisbon Metro During the Beginning of Operations
Lisbon Metro network in 1959, when it was inaugurated.

Lisbon Metro network in 1963, after completion of the connection between Restauradores and Rossio stations.

Lisbon Metro network in 1966, after completion of the Rossio–Anjos segment.

Lisbon Metro network in 1972, after completion of the Anjos–Alvalade segment.

=== 1980–1989: Initial expansion ===
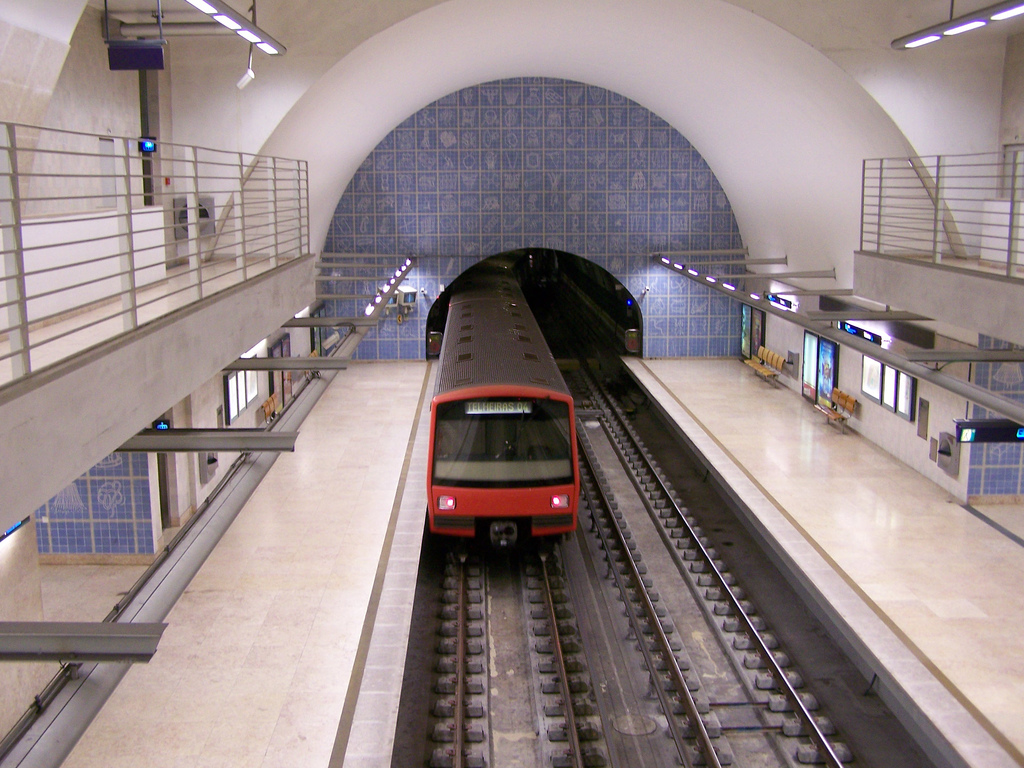
Lisbon Metro train at the Green Line Telheiras station.

In the 1980s, additional extensions to the metro network began to be studied. An extension from Alvalade to Calvanas was planned to begin construction in 1980 and the extension from Sete Rios to Colégio Militar (later Colégio Militar/Luz) was expected to begin construction in 1982.

In 1984, works began to extend the eastern branch of the initial line from Entre Campos to Campo Grande (then called Cruz Norte). At the same time, construction of the extension from Alvalade to Campo Grande began; plans to build a station at Calvanas, near the Júlio de Matos hospital, had already been abandoned at the time.

By the end of the decade, on 14 October 1988, the extension connecting Sete Rios to Colégio Militar/Luz was inaugurated, opening three stations: Laranjeiras, with artwork by Sá Nogueira, Alto dos Moinhos (artwork by Júlio Pomar), and Colégio Militar/Luz (artwork by Manuel Cargaleiro). Cidade Universitária (connected to the main campus of the University of Lisbon, with artwork by Maria Helena Vieira da Silva) opened at the same time, as part of the extension from Entre Campos to Campo Grande. These four stations were the first to be built from scratch with platforms long enough to receive six cars (105 metres (344 ft 6 in)) and with artwork in the platforms themselves.

Lisbon Metro During Initial Expansion
Lisbon Metro network in October 1988, after the extensions from Jardim Zoológico to Colégio Militar/Luz and Entre Campos to Cidade Universitária were completed.

=== 1990–1999: Rapid expansion to accommodate Expo '98 ===
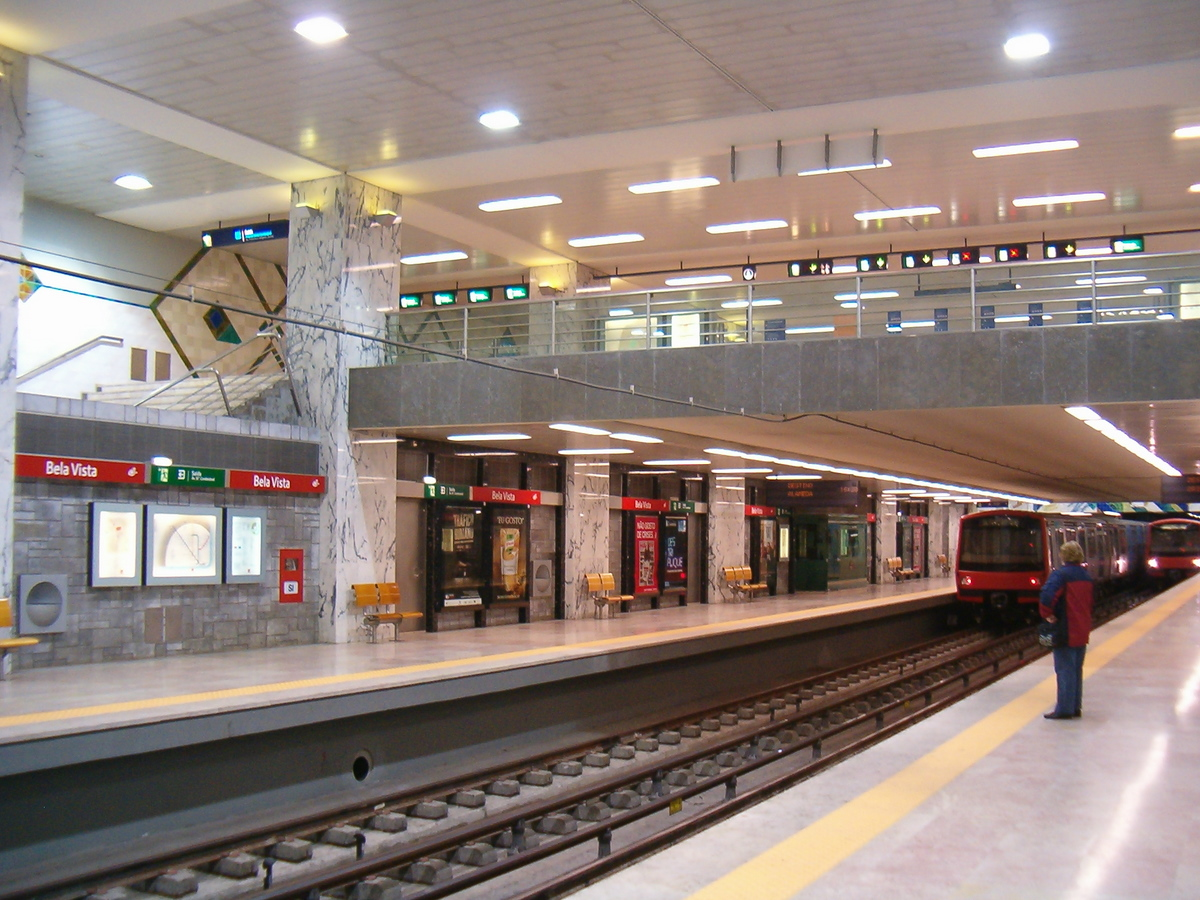
Bela Vista station (Red Line).

Olaias station (Red Line).

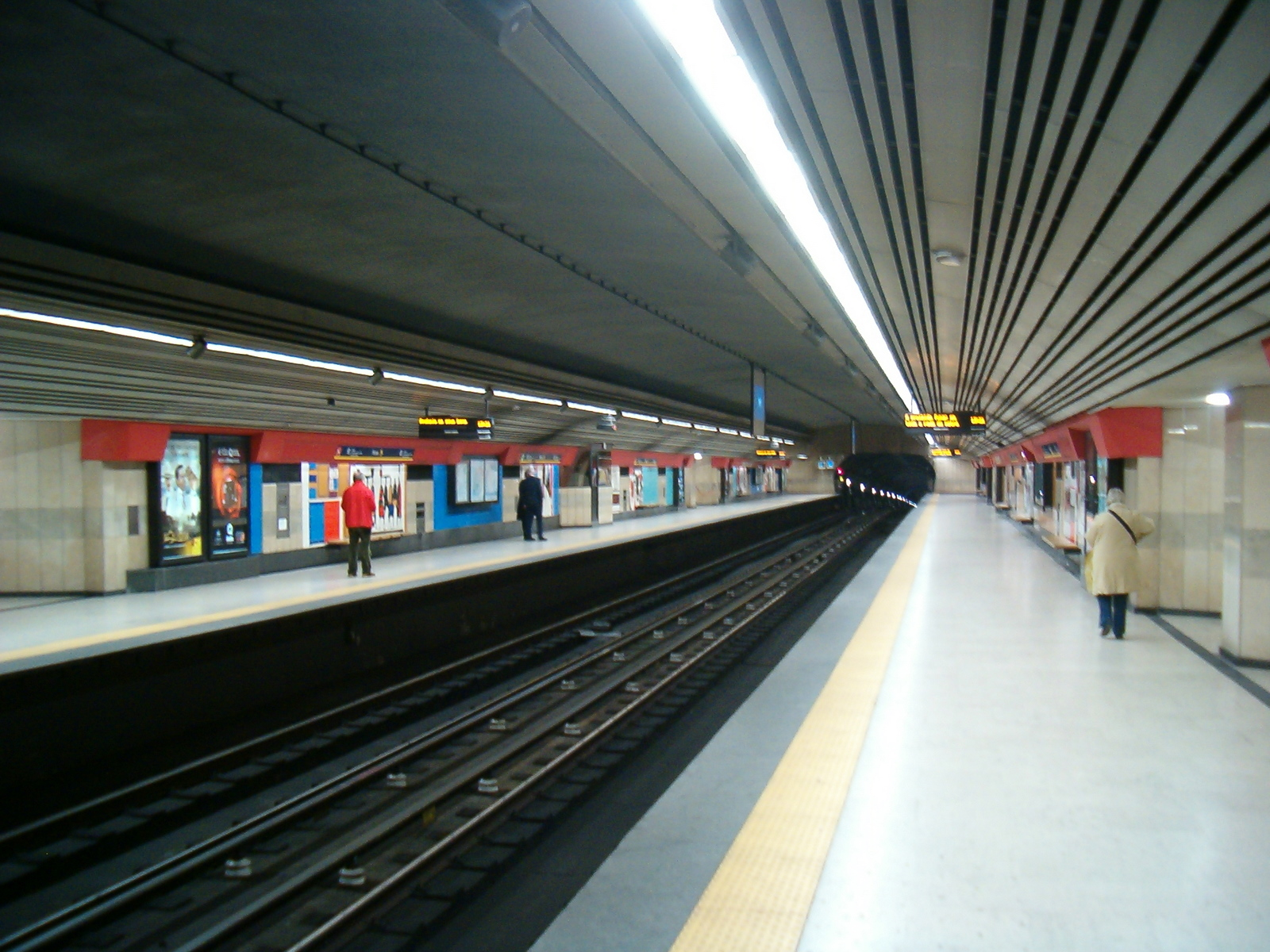
Picoas station (Yellow Line).

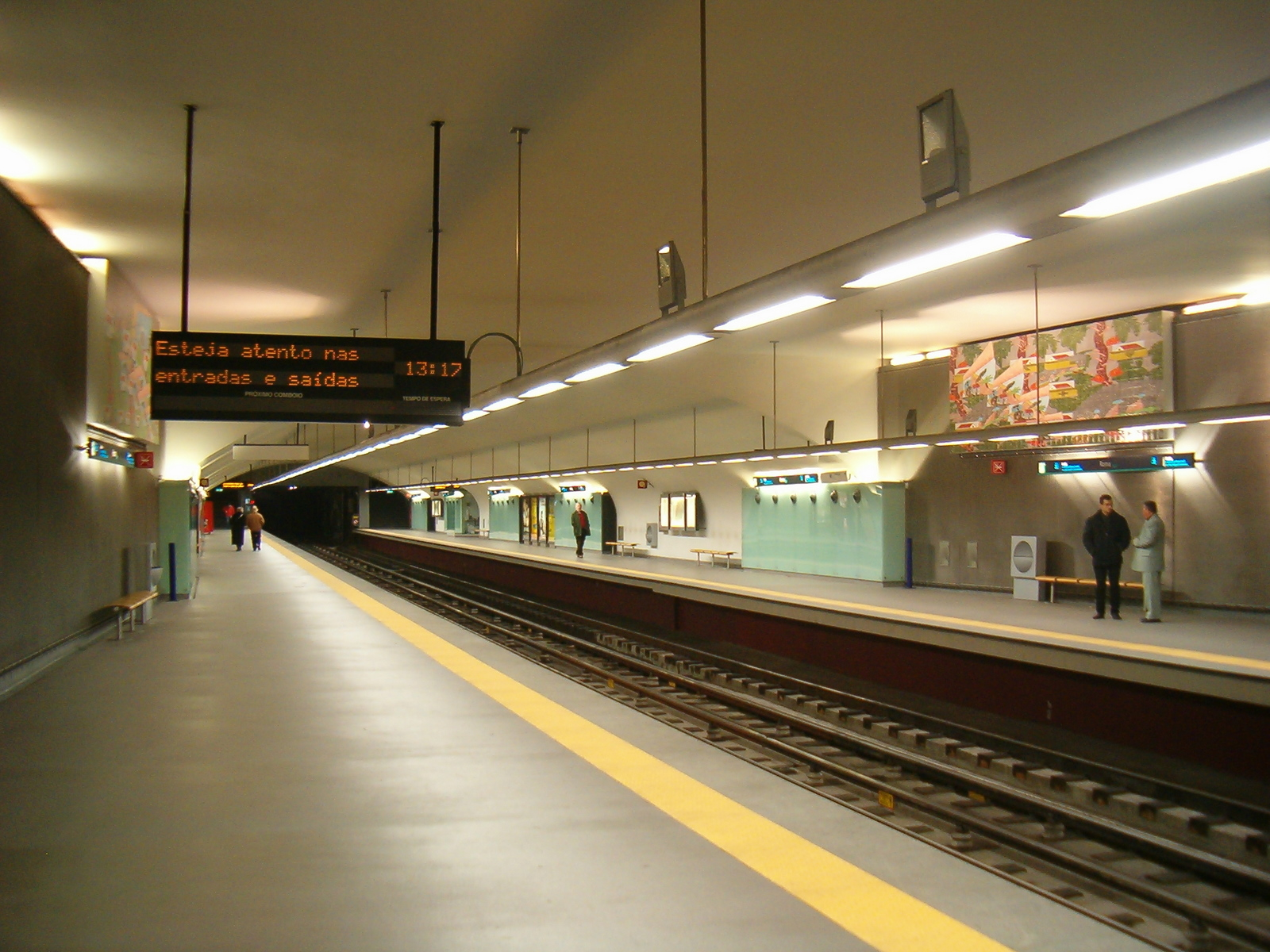
Roma station (Green Line).

In 1990, the Network Expansion Plan was presented, which included extensions from Rossio to Cais do Sodré and from Restauradores to Baixa-Chiado, splitting the Y in Rotunda (extending the branch from Picoas to a new station, Rato) and the extension Colégio Militar/Luz–Pontinha (including a new depot near the Pontinha station, PMO III).

In 1991, the first prototype of the ML90 car series was presented, consisting of two triple units (motor-trailer-motor) of six cars (with the first unit being numbered M-201, R-202 and M-203), built by Sorefame/Bombardier. These cars had a digital destination sign, were generally more comfortable and could operate with or without the trailer. The motor cars in these two triple units were also the only ones to have a front door to the cab, which was not included in further batches.

On 3 April 1993, the elevated Campo Grande station opened, along with the expansions Alvalade–Campo Grande and Cidade Universitária–Campo Grande. With this extensions, the network grew 5.0 km (3.1 mi). In the same month, the ML90 prototype cars were used for the first time.

In 1993, the second Network Expansion Plan was presented, intended to serve Expo '98. It recommended that the Metro should operate the following routes by 1999:

- A would run from the northwest end of the city at Pontinha to the east end of Baixa (Terreiro do Paço);
- B would run from the Lumiar to Campolide;
- C would run from Telheiras to the seaport at Cais do Sodré;
- D would run from Alameda to the exposition site at Moscavide in the northeastern end of the city.

The PMO II depot at Campo Grande was finished in the autumn of 1994 after eleven years of works. At the end of this year, the second batch of ML90 was ordered, consisting of 17 triple units (or 51 cars). On 15 July 1995, the two services were finally realigned into Line A (blue) between Colégio Militar/Luz and Campo Grande via Rossio, and Line B (yellow) between Campo Grande and Rotunda. The old Rotunda station (now Rotunda I) was extended from 75 to 105 metres and totally refurbished, while the new station (Rotunda II) already had a platform with 105 metres.

By the end of 1996, the second batch of ML 90 (numbered M-207 to M-257) was ready; colors and materials used in this second batch differed somewhat from that made up the first. The rolling stock was now composed of 191 coaches: 80 of them ML7, 54 ML90 and 57 ML79. On 18 October 1997, the Blue Line expansion from Colégio Militar/Luz to Pontinha opened, expanding the network by 1.6 km (0.99 mi). In December of the same year, Rato opened, 0.6 km (0.37 mi) from Rotunda II. Orders for new rolling stock continued in 1997, when half of the cars now known as ML95 were delivered (19 electric triple units, motor-trail-motor, or 57 cars). These new coaches, which look similar to ML90, have some technical differences, like a different engine and electrical door control (unlike the pneumatic control used on its predecessors). The new logo of the Lisbon Metro was first inserted into these new coaches.

1998 was a year when most of the said expansion projects were completed; as early as March the names of four stations had changed:

- Sete Rios → Jardim Zoológico
- Palhavã → Praça de Espanha
- Rotunda I and II → Marquês de Pombal I and II
- Socorro → Martim Moniz

In March 1998, the section between Rossio and Campo Grande became part of the Green Line, which removed the connection between Restauradores and Rossio stations from regular service. On 18 April, the section Rossio - Cais do Sodré (1.4 km (0.87 mi)) was opened, with two stations: Baixa-Chiado and Cais do Sodré, the latter connecting to the train and boat stations.

The Red Line (Line D at the time) would be inaugurated on 19 May 1998, three days before the opening of Expo '98. This line was 5 km (3.1 mi) long and included five new stations: Alameda II, Olaias, Bela Vista, Chelas, and Oriente; the line began running six car trains beginning in June of that year on an experimental basis in order to satisfy the demand of passengers visiting Lisbon during Expo '98. By this time, the entire ML95 series had been delivered, numbered M-301 to M-414.

Later in 1998, Cabo Ruivo (on 18 July) and Olivais (on 8 August) opened as infill stations on the Red Line, between Chelas and Oriente. The rolling stock was then composed of 305 cars – 80 ML7, 54 ML79, 57 ML90 and 114 ML95, and the network comprised 40 stations.

In 1999, the PMO III depot opened near the Pontinha station, replacing the old PMO I depot at Sete Rios, in an event where the prototype of the future car series (now known as ML97) was presented, which would consist of 18 articulated triple units (54 cars). The main difference from the previous series was the possibility of free movement between each car. In addition, the prototype had a more modern image, and also introduced digital automatic passenger information. According to the operator, the trailer of these triple units can be removed, although this has never been witnessed. The first cars were issued during 1999, numbered M-501 to M-554. The rolling stock, at the turn of the millennium, was made of 361 cars of five train types (80 ML7, 54 ML79, 57 ML90, 114 ML95, 54 ML97), the largest number of train cars to date before the retirement of the ML7 and ML79 series in 2000 and 2002, respectively.

Lisbon Metro During Expansion for Expo '98
Lisbon Metro network in April 1993, after completion of the Campo Grande–Alvalade and Campo Grande–Cidade Universitária segments.

Lisbon Metro network in July 1995, when the segment between Campo Grande and Rotunda became part of the Yellow Line.

Lisbon Metro network in December 1997, when the Rotunda–Rato segment of the Yellow Line was completed.

Lisbon Metro network in November 1998, when the Campo Grande-Rossio segment was extended to Cais do Sodré and became part of the Green Line, and the initial segment of the Red Line (between Alameda and Oriente) was completed; the Blue Line was extended to Baixa-Chiado to provide a transfer point with the Green Line after the Restauradores–Rossio connection was removed from regular service.

=== 2001–2016: Continued expansion ===
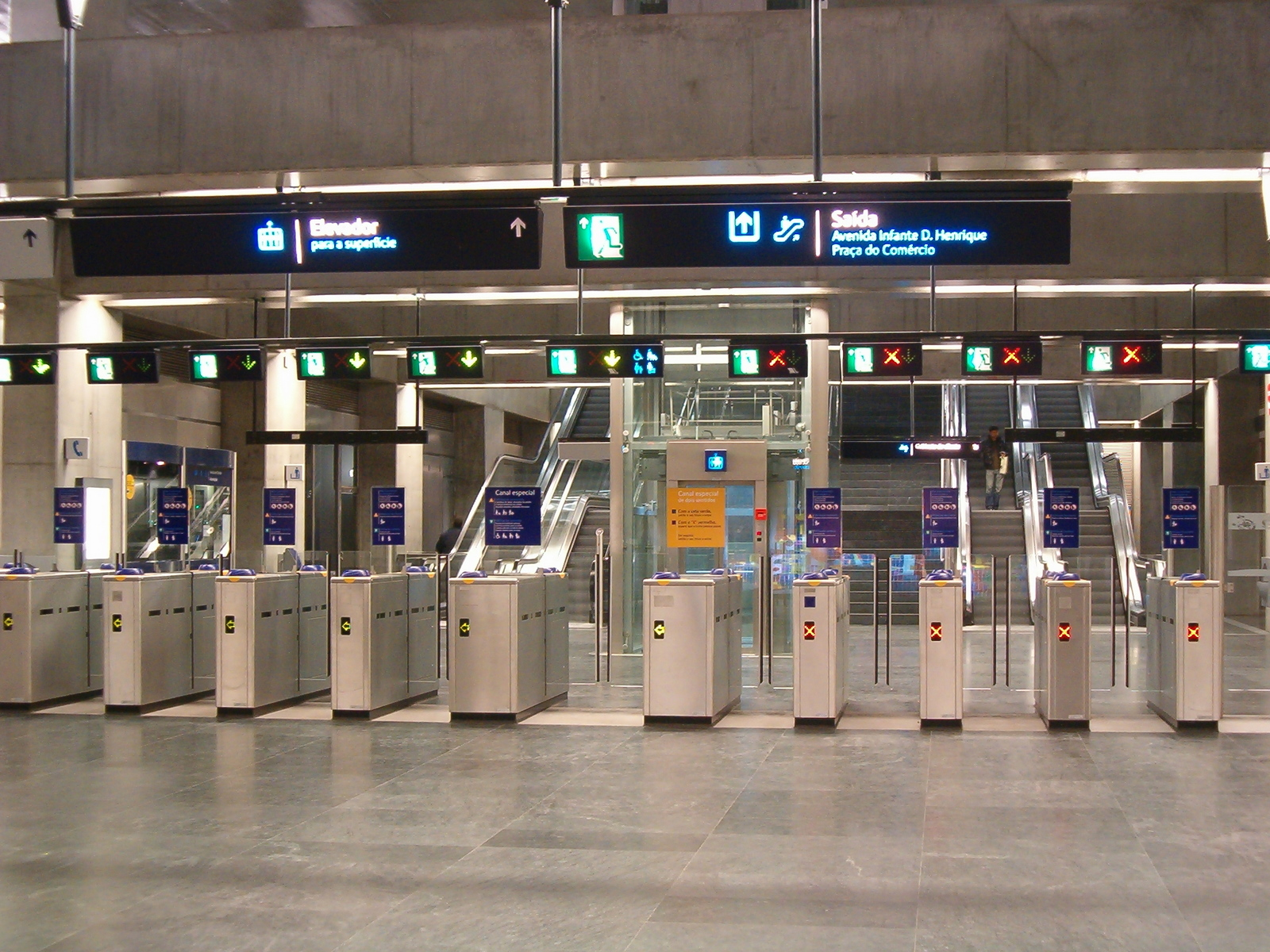
Terreiro do Paço station atrium (Blue Line).

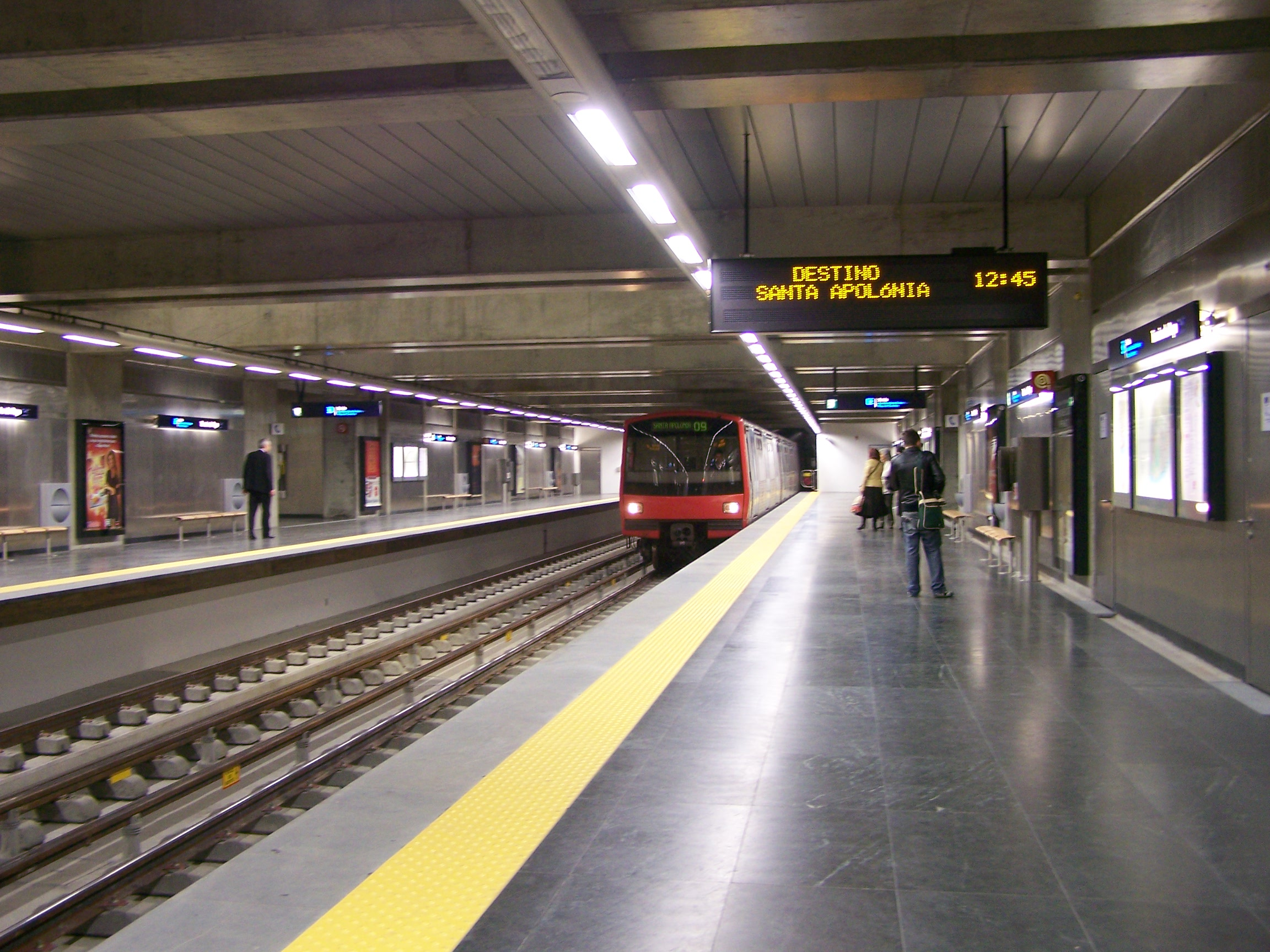
Terreiro do Paço station (Blue Line).

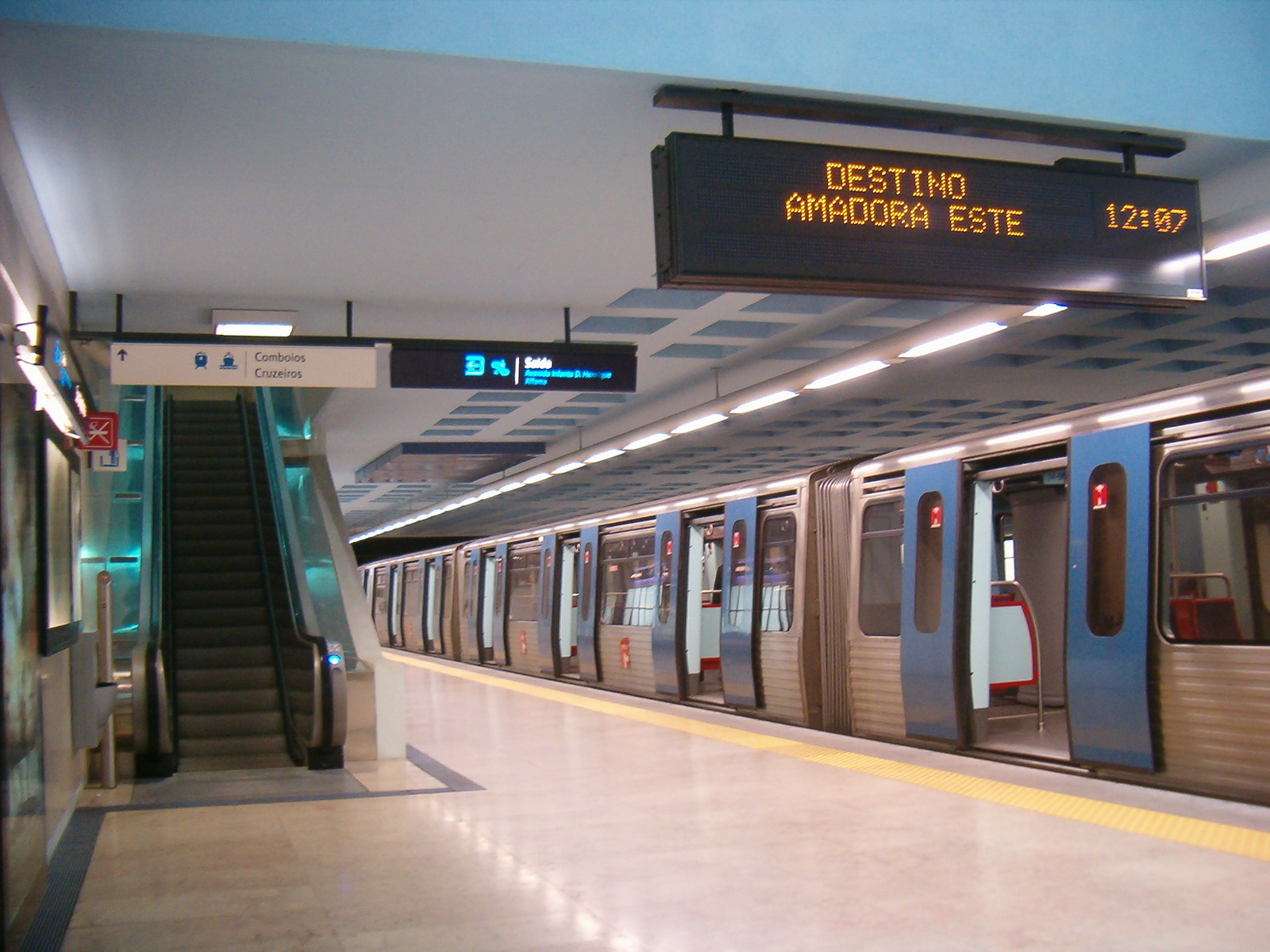
Santa Apolónia station (Blue Line).

On 2 November 2002, under Manuel Frasquilho's tenure as president, the Green Line's extension from Campo Grande to Telheiras opened. In 2004, the network opened its first extensions outside the geographical limits of the city: first, in March, with the expansion of the Yellow Line from Campo Grande to Odivelas (which included five new stations, two of which are aboveground); then, in May, the Blue Line was extended from Pontinha to Amadora Este. Later that year, construction of the Red Line segment between Alameda and São Sebastião began.

On 19 December 2007, after 11 years of construction, the final 2.2 km (1.4 mi)-long section of the Blue Line between Baixa-Chiado and Santa Apolónia opened, with some controversy and many successive delays due to the difficulty of construction. The segment was originally slated to open in 2001, but in 2000, cracks were discovered in the original tunnel that led to land subsidence. The consequent flooding of the tunnel seriously slowed down the completion of work and road traffic at the Praça do Comércio and part of the Avenida Infante D. Henrique was forced to be closed temporarily while the new tunnel was constructed in its place. The stations themselves (Terreiro do Paço and Santa Apolónia) were completed in the summer of 2007.

On 29 August 2009, the Red Line section between Alameda II and São Sebastião II was inaugurated, such that all lines now cross each other.

On 17 July 2012, the Red Line was extended between Oriente and Aeroporto, adding 3.3 km (2.1 mi) to the network. Three new stations have been inaugurated: Moscavide, Encarnação and Aeroporto, which is directly linked to the Lisbon Portela Airport. A journey from the central Saldanha station to the Lisbon Airport now only lasts about 16 minutes. The Red Line also serves the Moscavide neighbourhood, and was expected to carry 400,000 extra passengers each year.

The Blue Line segment between Amadora Este and Reboleira on the Blue Line opened on 17 April 2016, twelve years after the initial portion of the segment between Pontinha and Amadora Este was completed.

Continued Expansion of the Lisbon Metro
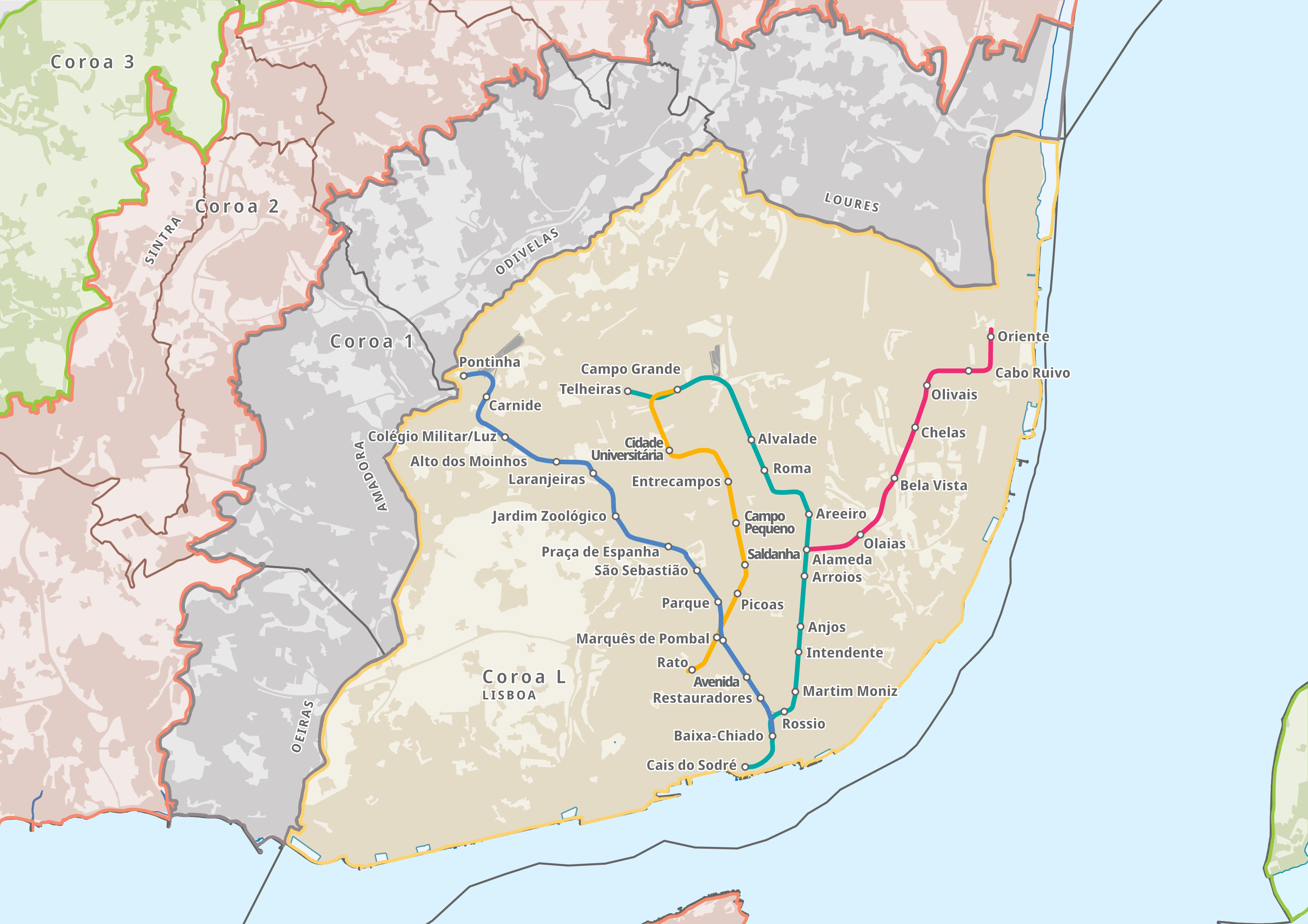
Lisbon Metro network in January 2003, after the Telheiras–Campo Grande segment of the Green Line was completed.

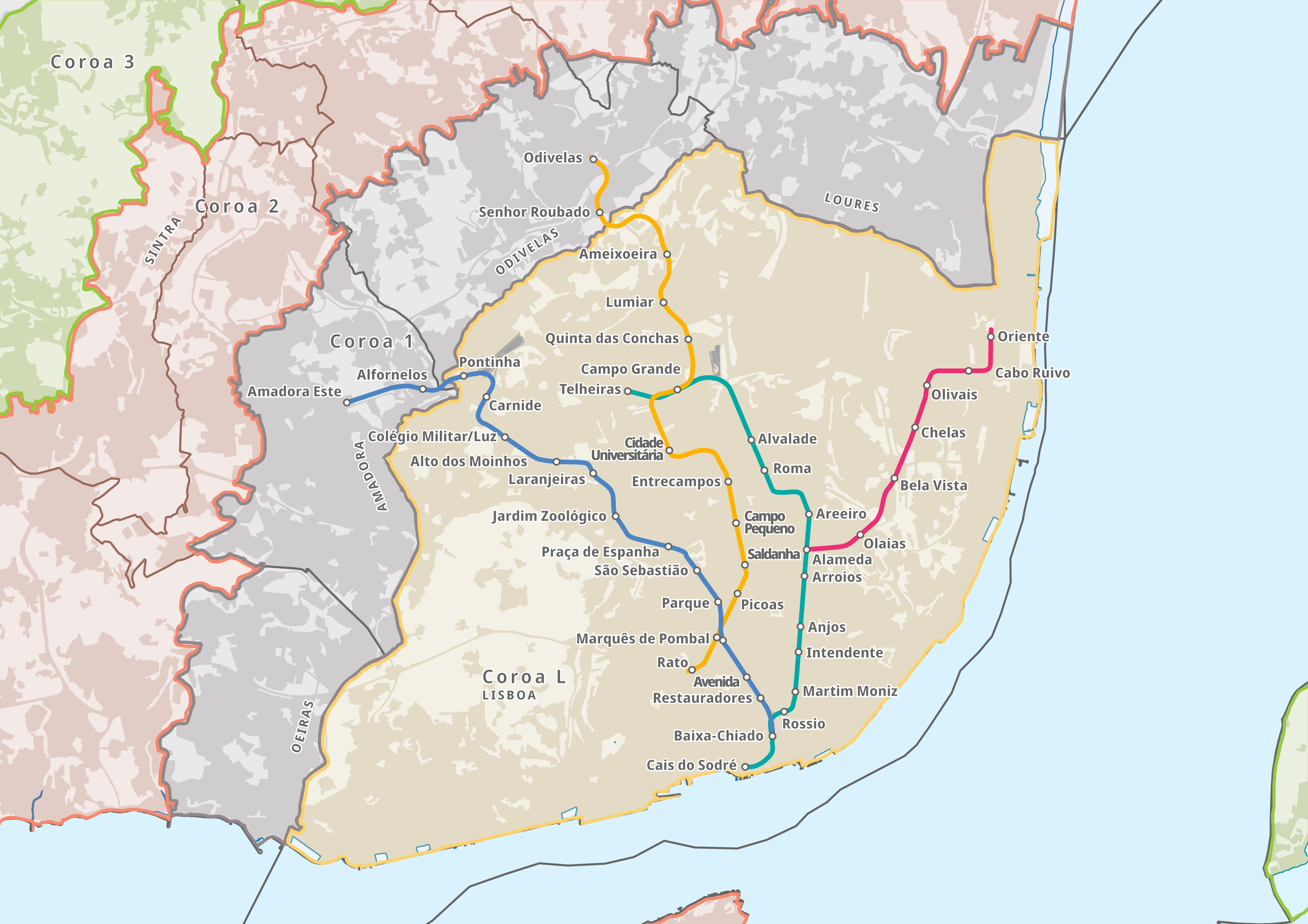
Lisbon Metro network in May 2004, after the Pontinha–Amadora Este segment of the Blue Line and the Campo Grande–Odivelas segment of the Yellow Line opened.

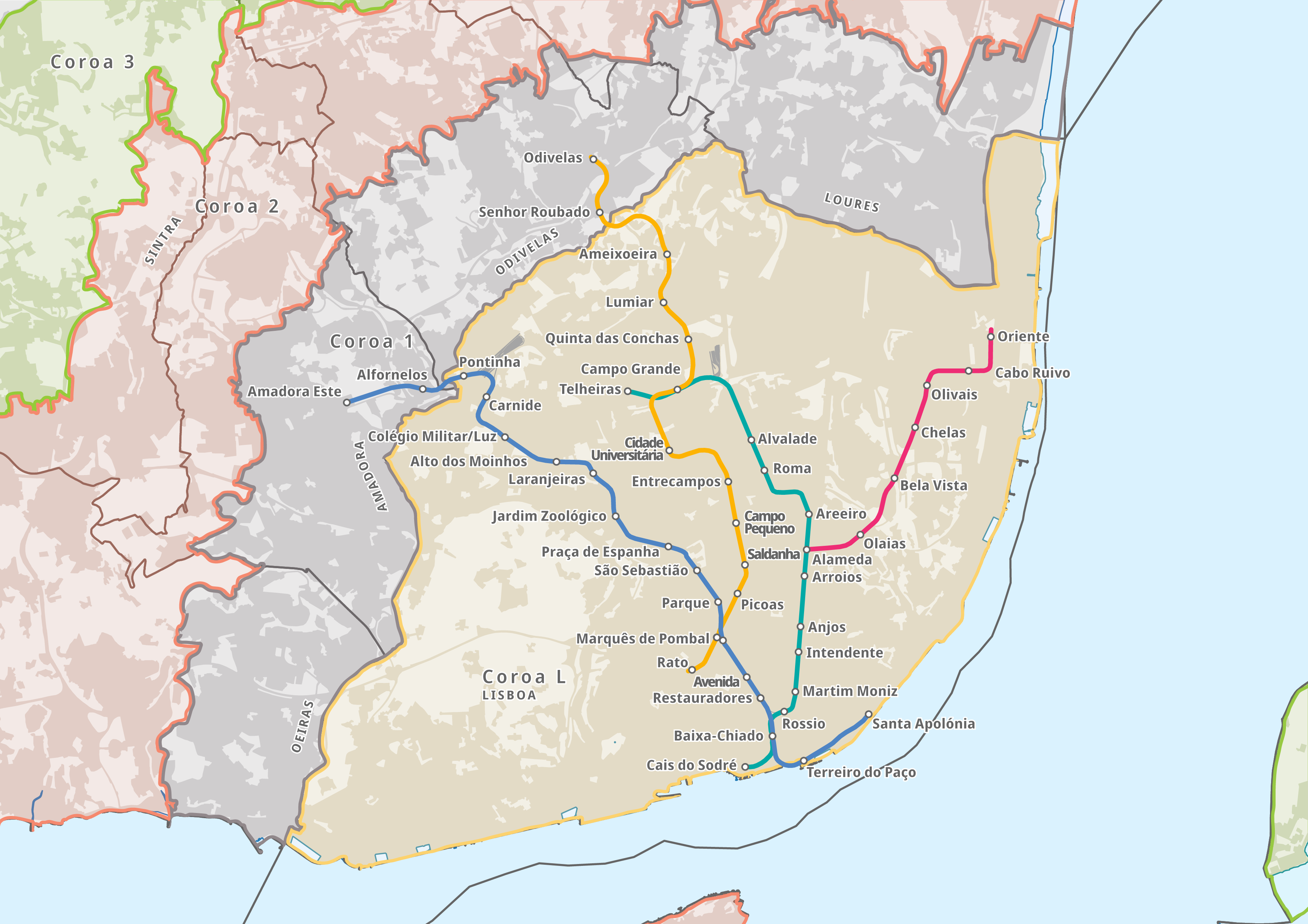
Lisbon Metro network in December 2007, after the Baixa-Chiado–Santa Apolónia segment of the Blue Line opened.

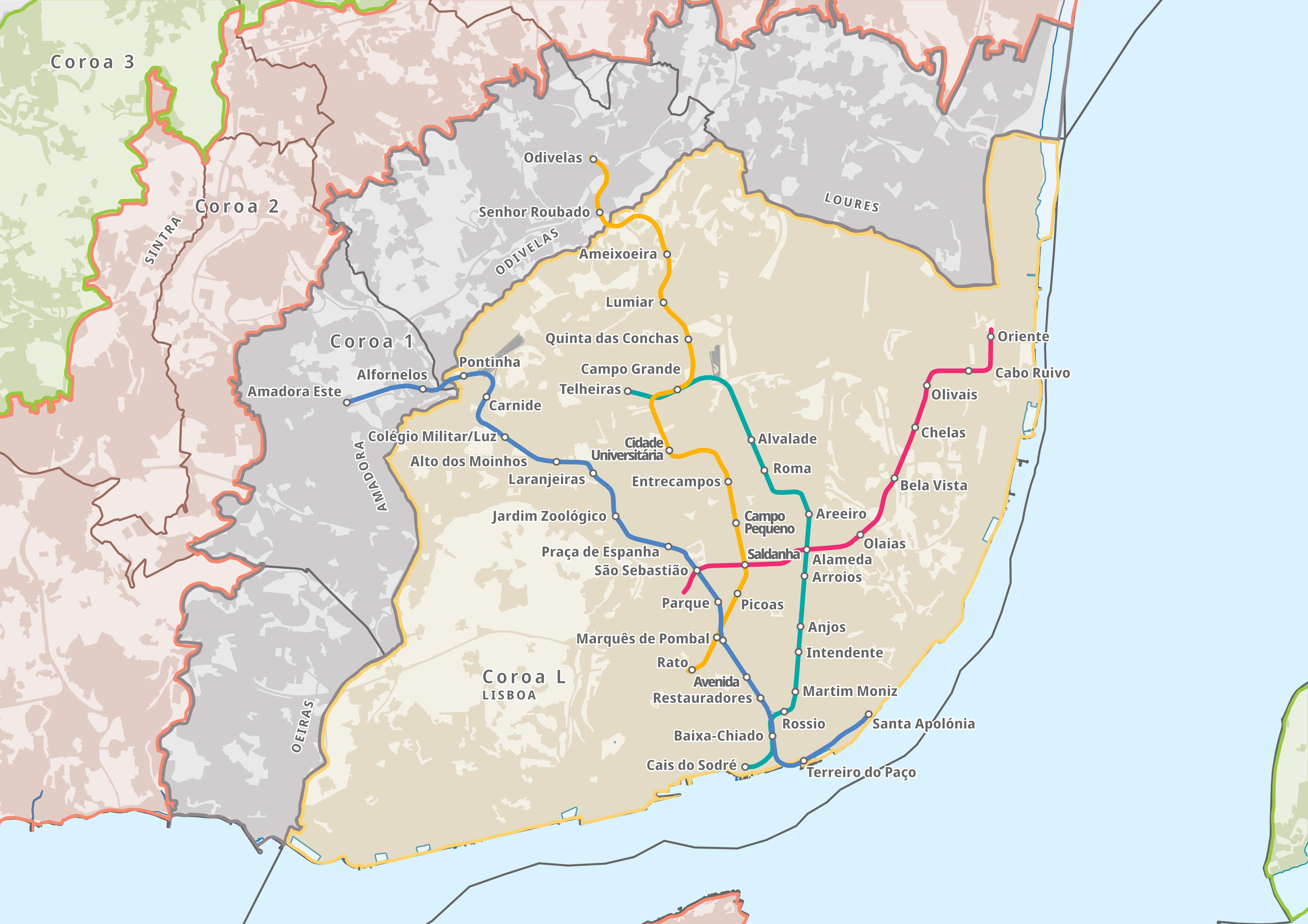
Lisbon Metro network in December 2009, after the Alameda–São Sebastião segment of the Red Line opened.

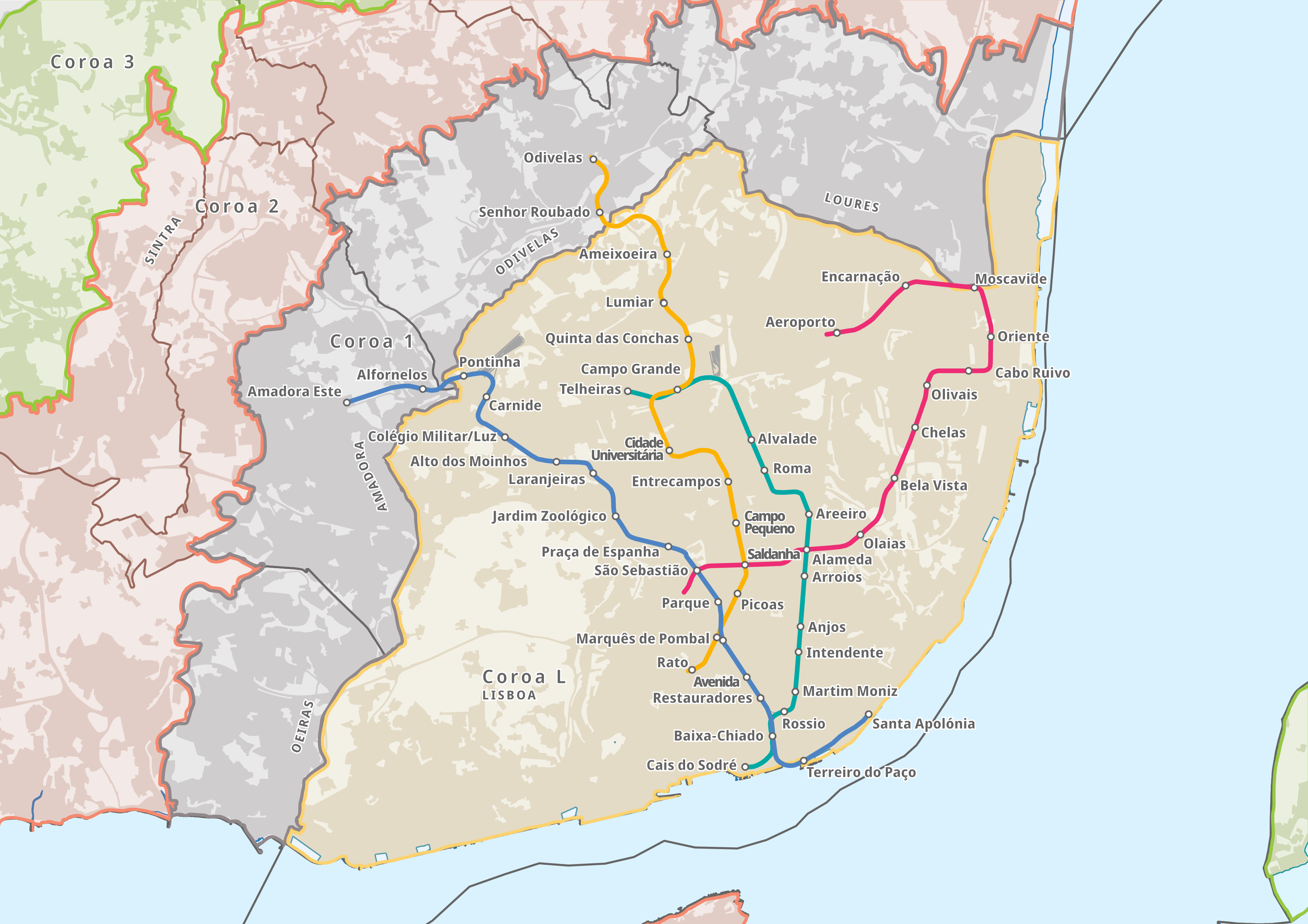
Lisbon Metro network in July 2012, after the Oriente–Aeroporto segment of the Red Line opened.

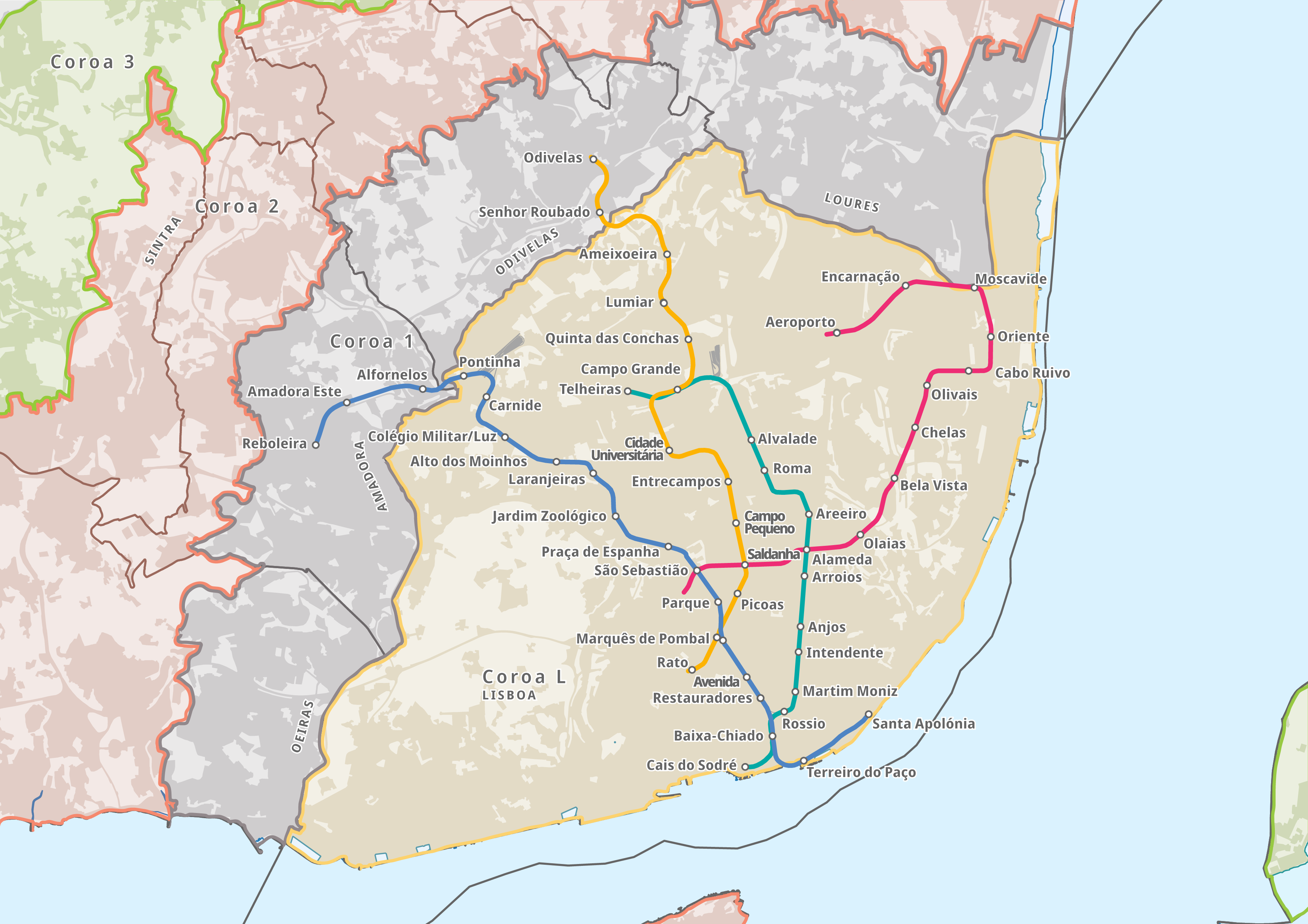
Lisbon Metro network in June 2016, after the Amadora Este–Reboleira segment of the Blue Line opened.

=== 2017–present ===
Further modernization works to the Lisbon Metro began on 19 July 2017, when the Arroios station on the Green Line was closed for extensive renovations and the expansion of the platforms to allow six-car trains; the station was originally scheduled to reopen in 2019, but reopening was later postponed to no earlier than 2021 due to construction delays. The renovated station finally reopened in September 2021. On 8 June 2018, portions of the platform edges at the Encarnação station on the Red Line partially collapsed onto the tracks, which necessitated a week-long closure of the segment between the Moscavide and Aeroporto stations. For the last two years of the 2010s, the metro's ridership growth began to slow as a result of economic concerns; after years of steady growth, ridership increased from 169 million passengers in 2018 to 173 million passengers in 2019 before it began to decline in 2020 as a result of the COVID-19 pandemic.

On 29 September 2020, portions of the tunnel near the Praça de Espanha station on the Blue Line collapsed while the station was undergoing renovation works, necessitating a temporary closure of the line between Laranjeiras and Marquês de Pombal stations.

==== Proposed extensions ====
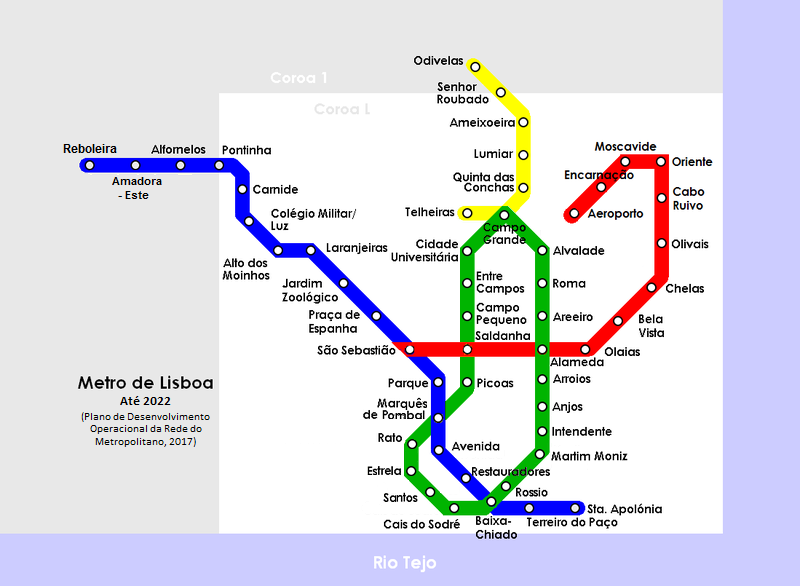
Proposed map of the network.

On 8 May 2017, the government of Portugal announced an extension of the Yellow Line to Cais do Sodré as part of a new operational master plan. The extension, which will connect the Yellow Line with the Green Line and is expected to open in 2024, will contain two new stations at Estrela and Santos; Campo Grande will also be reconstructed as part of the project. Construction on this extension began on 16 April 2021. Once the extension is placed into service, the Green and Yellow lines will be reorganised: the Green Line will run as a circular route and will take over the section of the Yellow Line between Campo Grande and Rato. With this change, the Yellow Line is proposed to extend from Telheiras to Benfica. This extension has been opposed by several groups, including the government of Odivelas and the PSD; the latter proposed a bill to the government in July 2019 that would call for the suspension of the project in favour of a metro extension into Loures.

An extension to the Red Line is also projected to be built, extending it to four entirely new stations: Campolide/Amoreiras, Campo de Ourique, Infante Santo and Alcântara. The project, if it goes forward, is projected to be completed by around 2026.

A new line, the Violet Line, is also projected to be constructed in the coming years. Unlike the rest of the Metro, this line would not be heavy rail, nor mostly underground, but rather surface light rail. It will connect the area of Infantado, in Loures to the metro station of Odivelas and then to Beatriz Ângelo Hospital, with the line making a "C" shape. It is planned to be completed by around 2025.

== Timeline ==
Evolution of the Lisbon Metro, 1959–2012

- December 1959: original Y-shaped network opened with 11 stations (Sete Rios, Palhavã, São Sebastião, Parque, Rotunda, Avenida, Restauradores, Picoas, Saldanha, Campo Pequeno, and Entre Campos). There were two routes: one from Sete Rios to Restauradores (which later became the Blue Line), and one from Restauradores to Entre Campos (which later became the Yellow Line).
- January 1963: The network was expanded east by one station (Rossio).
- September 1966: The network was extended from Rossio northwards (three new stations were built: Socorro, Intendente and Anjos).
- June 1972: New stations: Arroios, Alameda, Areeiro, Roma and Alvalade
- October 1988: New stations: Laranjeiras, Alto dos Moinhos, Colégio Militar-Luz and Cidade Universitária
- April 1993: Campo Grande opens as the first elevated station in the system; temporary service between Rotunda and Colégio Militar/Luz via Campo Grande commences.
- July 1995: Rotunda disconnected; single 'Y' line divided into two separate lines (Blue and Yellow); public display of a new modernization plan that involves the creation of several independent interconnected lines and a new corporate identity.
- October 1997: New stations in the Blue Line: Carnide and Pontinha
- December 1997: New station in the Yellow Line: Rato
- March 1998: Disconnecting the section Restauradores – Rossio; Creation of the Green Line (Socorro, Intendente, Anjos, Arroios, Alameda, Areeiro, Roma, Alvalade and Campo Grande - common to the Yellow Line), renaming of several stations: Rotunda to Marquês de Pombal, Sete Rios to Jardim Zoológico, Palhavã to Praça de Espanha, and Socorro to Praça Martim Moniz.
- April 1998: New stations in the Green Line: Baixa-Chiado and Cais do Sodré
- May 1998: Opening of the Red Line, with 5 new stations: Alameda II, Olaias, Bela Vista, Chelas and Oriente
- July 1998: New station in the Red Line: Cabo Ruivo
- August 1998: New station in the Blue Line: Baixa-Chiado (new platform)
- November 1998: New station in the Red Line: Olivais
- November 2002: New station in the Green Line: Telheiras
- March 2004: New stations in the Yellow line, extending it to the outskirts of Lisbon: Quinta das Conchas, Lumiar, Ameixoeira, Senhor Roubado and Odivelas
- May 2004: New stations in the Blue Line: Alfornelos and Amadora Este
- December 2007: New stations in the Blue Line: Terreiro do Paço and Santa Apolónia.
- August 2009: New stations in the Red Line: Saldanha II and São Sebastião II; first time that all 4 lines are truly interconnected, strengthening the network.
- 2010: Several stations on the Green Line are being lengthened to accommodate 6 car trains, enabling standardisation of rolling stock.
- 17 July 2012: New stations on the Red Line: Moscavide, Encarnação and Aeroporto. The line now connects Saldanha station to Lisbon Airport in just 16 minutes.
- 7 April 2016: Blue Line extended from Amadora Este to Reboleira railway station. This involved extending the tunnel from Amadora Este, which passes under the former spur track linking the Sintra Line of CP to the old Sorefame factory towards the Reboleira metro station located under the said train station. The opening was originally planned for 2011–2012. However, the opening of the extension was delayed for four years due to financial difficulties.
- 19 July 2017: Arroios station closed for renovations.
- 14 September 2021: Arroios station reopened.

== Lines ==
Map of Lisbon Underground with all planned future expansions.

The Lisbon Metro comprises four lines running on 44.5 kilometres (27.7 mi) of route and serving 56 stations. The lines were formerly known by picturesque names; logos based on the former names are still used. These picturesque names are still used as secondary names.

Colour	Name	Termini	Stations	Length	History
Linha Azul; Blue Line	Linha da Gaivota; Seagull Line	Santa Apolónia; Reboleira	18	14 km (8.7 mi)	1959: Sete Rios (now Jardim Zoológico) – Restauradores 1988: Sete Rios (now Jardim Zoológico) – Colégio Militar/Luz; 1997: Colégio Militar/Luz – Pontinha; 1998: Restauradores - Baixa-Chiado (Blue and Green Lines split); 2004: Pontinha – Amadora Este; 2007: Baixa-Chiado – Santa Apolónia 2016: Amadora Este – Reboleira
Linha Amarela; Yellow Line	Linha do Girassol; Sunflower Line	Rato; Odivelas	13	11 km (6.8 mi)	1959: Entre Campos – Rotunda (now Marquês de Pombal) 1988: Entre Campos – Cidade Universitária; 1993: Cidade Universitária – Campo Grande; 1997: Rotunda (now Marquês de Pombal) – Rato 2004: Campo Grande – Odivelas
Linha Verde; Green Line	Linha da Caravela; Caravel Line	Cais do Sodré; Telheiras	13	9 km (5.6 mi)	1963: Restauradores – Rossio 1966: Rossio - Anjos; 1972: Anjos - Alvalade; 1993: Alvalade – Campo Grande; 1998: Rossio – Cais do Sodré (Blue and Green lines split) 2002: Campo Grande – Telheiras
Linha Vermelha; Red Line	Linha do Oriente; Orient Line	São Sebastião; Aeroporto	12	11.5 km (7.1 mi)	1998: Alameda – Oriente 2009: Alameda (II) – São Sebastião (II) 2012: Oriente – Aeroporto

=== Future expansion ===
Colour	Name	New Stations	Stations	Length	History
Linha Verde; Green Line	Linha da Caravela; Caravel Line	Estrela; Santos	2	2 km (1.2 mi)	2027: Cais do Sodré – Estrela
Linha Vermelha; Red Line	Linha do Oriente; Orient Line	Campolide/Amoreiras; Campo de Ourique; Infante Santos; Alcântara	4	4.1 km (2.5 mi)	2030: São Sebastião – Alcântara

== Operation ==
=== Operating hours and frequency ===
Metro service starts every day at 06:30 and stops at 01:00 (the last trains arrive at the terminal stations by 01:30). However, some station exits close before 01:00. Trains run at a 5–8 minutes headway. Tests will begin in 2026 to start service one hour earlier at 5:30, with eventual definitive adoption in January 2027 .

=== Ticketing and fares ===
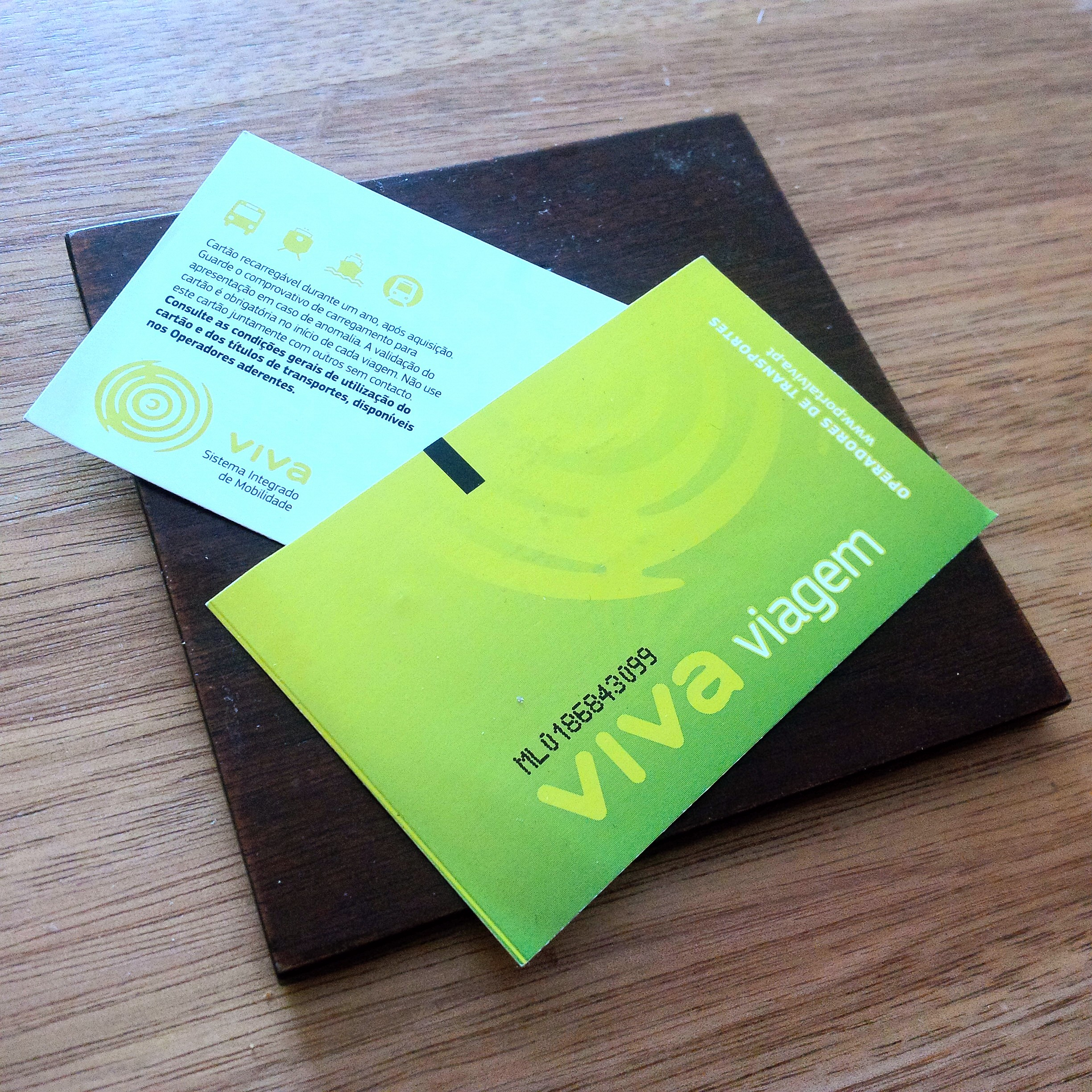
Viva Viagem cards (2014)

There are two methods of payment:

- The contactless Cartão 7 Colinas/Viva Viagem card
- The contactless Lisboa Viva card which can also double up as monthly passes
- The contactless Lisboa Navegante card which can either be charged with the metropolitan pass, or only for the Lisbon municipality

All three cards can also be used on other modes of transport like Fertagus, CP (including its suburban rail service) and the Transtejo & Soflusa ferry service.

== Rolling stock ==
=== Current ===
Currently, four types of trains are in service on the Lisbon Metro. Unlike most metro systems, the trains do not have any form of air conditioning due to the small size of the tunnels.

- ML90 series (since 29 March 1993)
- ML95 series (since 1997)
- ML97 series (since 1 February 1999)
- ML99 series (since 3 July 2000, 1 carriage destroyed in a PMO incident in 2002)

=== Former ===
- ML7 series (from 29 December 1959 until 31 January 2000, two cars preserved and run on certain special occasions)
- ML79 series (from 1 January 1984 until 11 July 2002, two cars preserved for exhibition)

=== Future ===
- ML20 series (from 2026)
- ML24 series (from 2027)

In 2021, Stadler Rail and Siemens Mobility won a contract to supply 14 three-car trains for Lisbon Metro. They are designated as the ML20 series. The first train was delivered from the Stadler Rail Valencia SAU factory in Spain on 9 August 2024 and is planned to enter service in January 2025.

In October 2024, Lisbon Metro again signed a contract with Stadler, this time for the supply of 24 three-car trains with an option for 12 more, designated as the ML24 series.

== Art ==
The architecture and decor of an underground station is a key element for the well-being of passengers, and art works to make travel more appealing. Lisbon Metro is one of the various underground systems in the world where art is best represented, much like the Munich U-Bahn in Germany, Moscow Metro in Russia, Montreal Metro in Canada and the Stockholm Metro in Sweden. From the beginning, there was a concern to make a smooth visual transition between surface and underground. Architect Francisco Keil do Amaral (1910–1975) designed a station model, which was used as a template for all stations built until 1972. In this model, the decor was very moderate, with smooth but firm lines, much like the Portuguese political regime at the time. The original eleven stations, except Avenida, had artwork by his wife, painter Maria Keil (1914–2012).

In 1988, with the completion of new expansions, there was still a concern about organizing and decorating stations, thus these stations featured works by contemporary Portuguese artists: Rolando de Sá Nogueira in Laranjeiras, Júlio Pomar in Alto dos Moinhos, Manuel Cargaleiro in Colégio Militar/Luz, and Vieira da Silva in Cidade Universitária.

Since then, art has become the norm in the Lisbon Metro; lighting plays with the brightness of the azulejo tiles that are present in almost every station. In recent years, the oldest stations have been refurbished, not only to enhance the decor and aesthetics, but also to improve accessibility for passengers with reduced mobility. Parque station is generally considered to be the most valuable and interesting of them all, where the tiles map details of the Portuguese voyages of discovery and their philosophical and literary links.

== See also ==
- Porto Metro
- Trams in Lisbon
- LisboaViva
- List of Lisbon metro stations
- List of rapid transit systems
