= Avenidas Novas =

- Civil parish
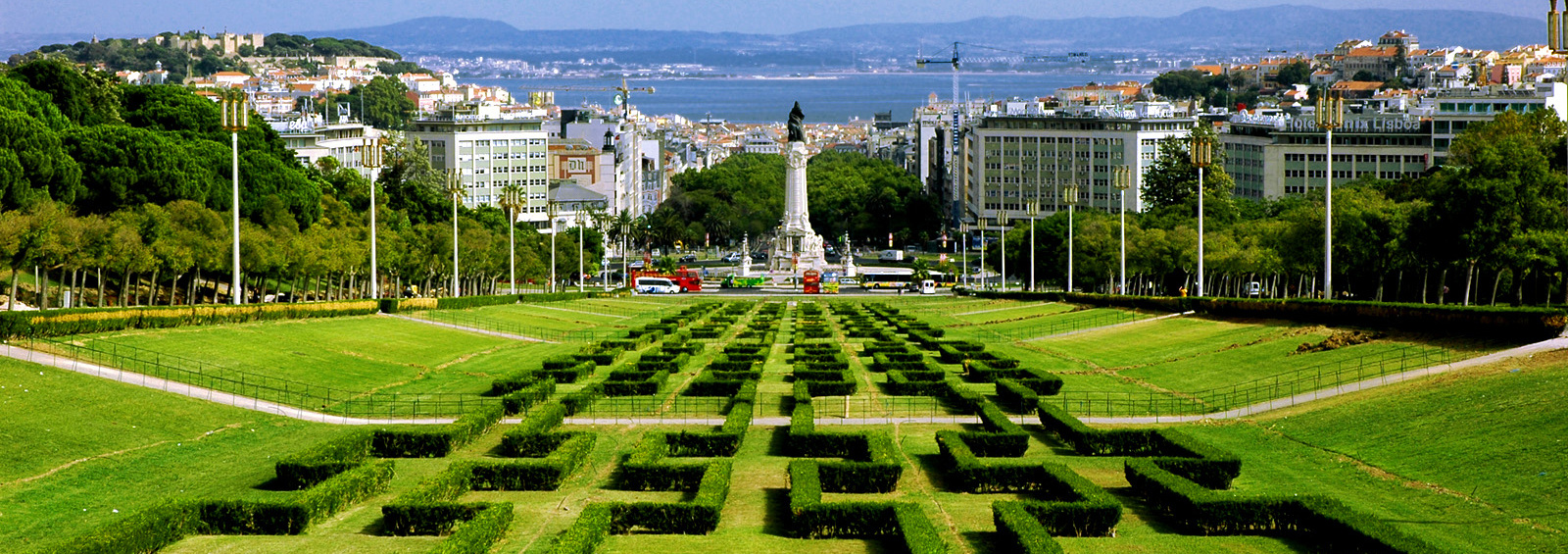
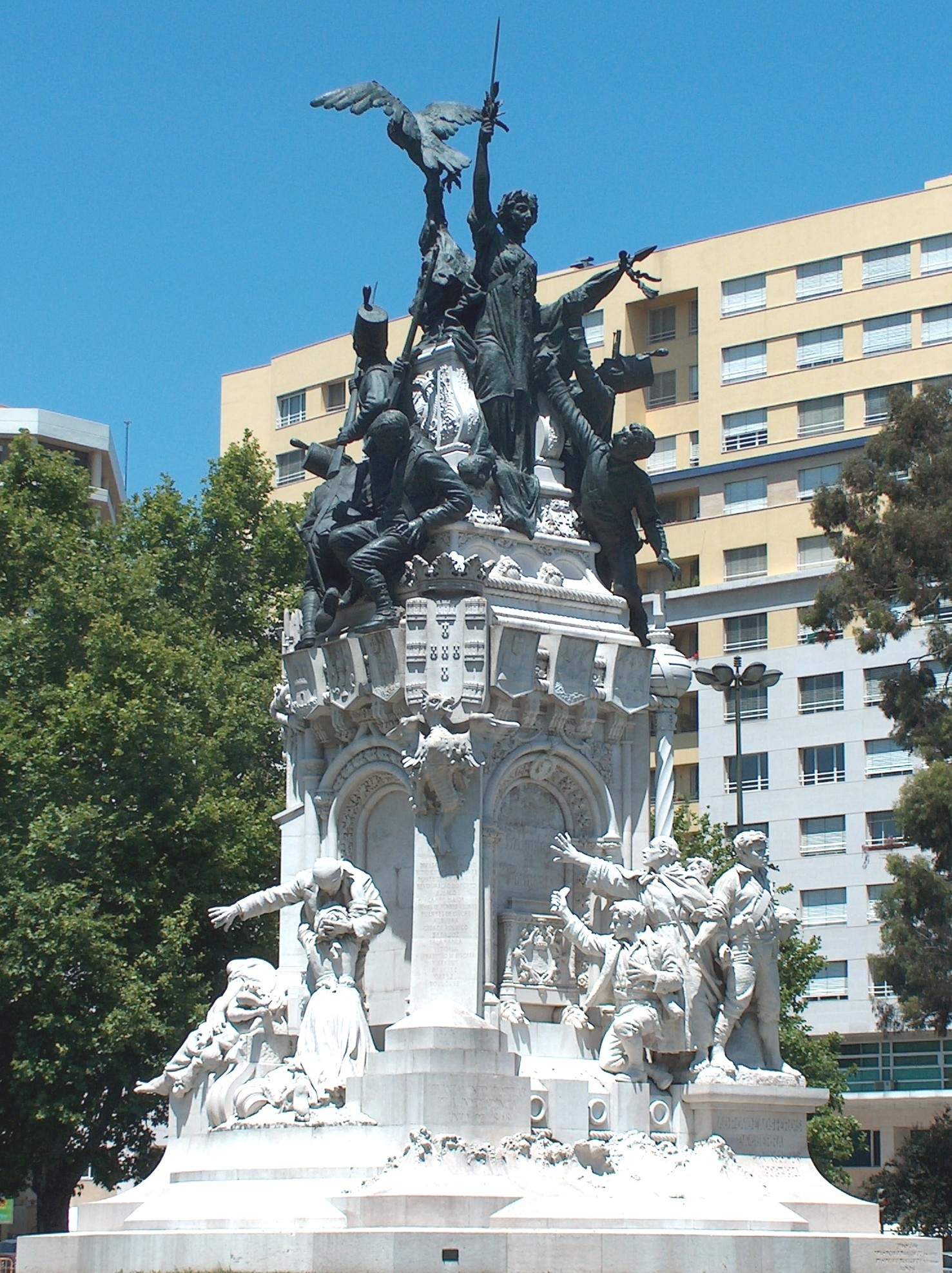
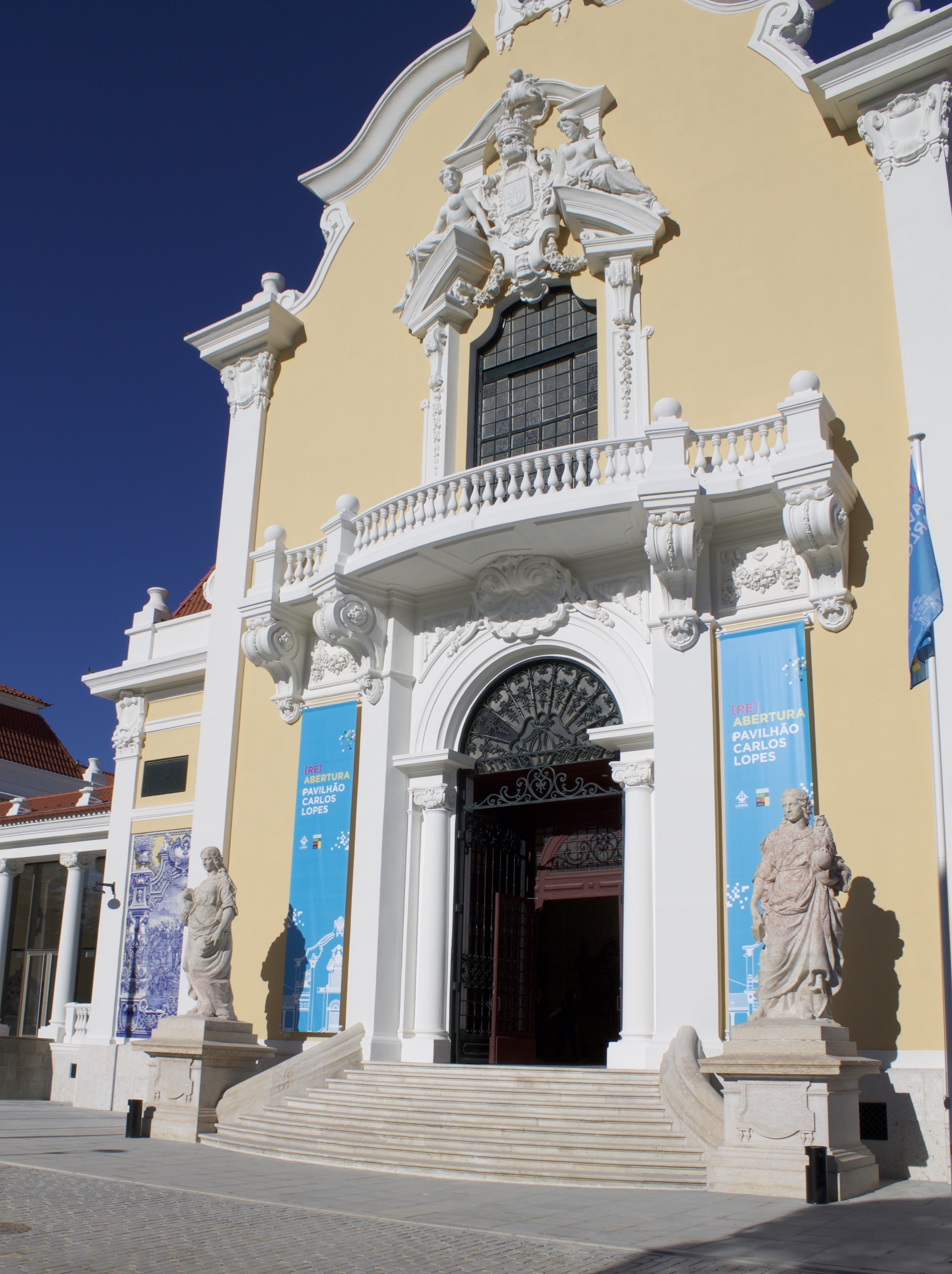
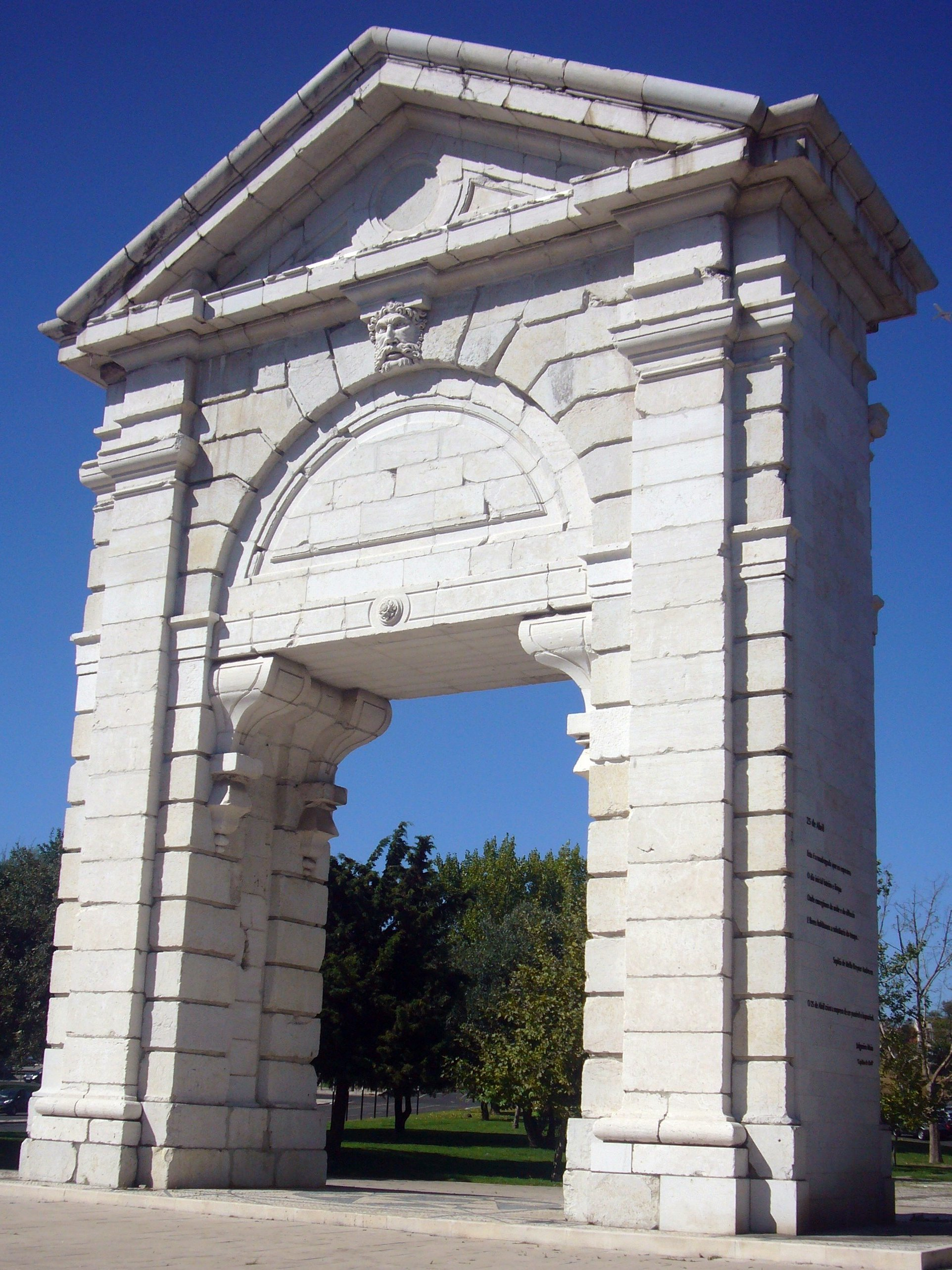
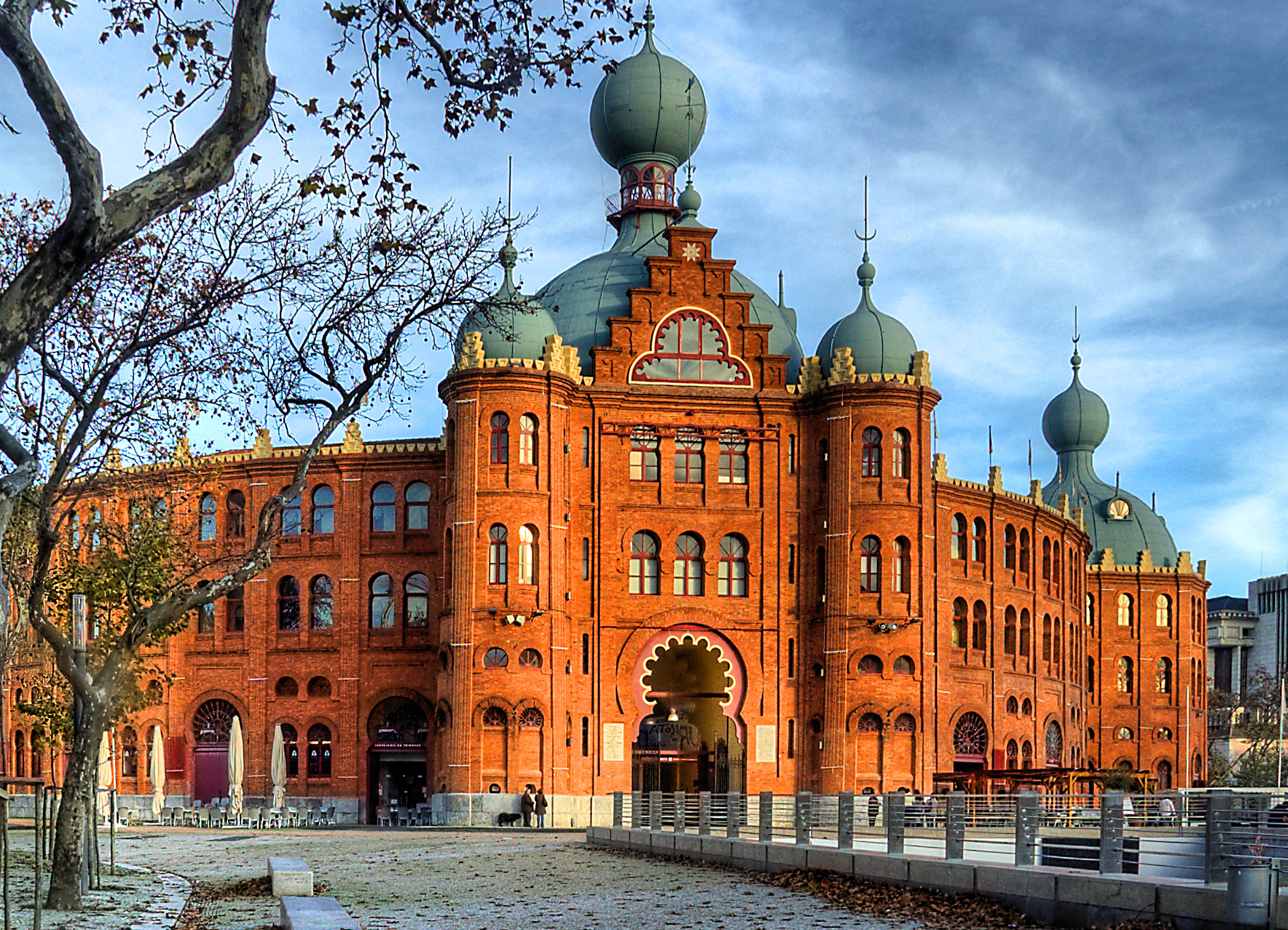
- Top: View from Edward VII Park; Middle: Praça de Entrecampos; Pavilhão Carlos Lopes; Praça de Espanha; Bottom: Campo Pequeno Bullring.

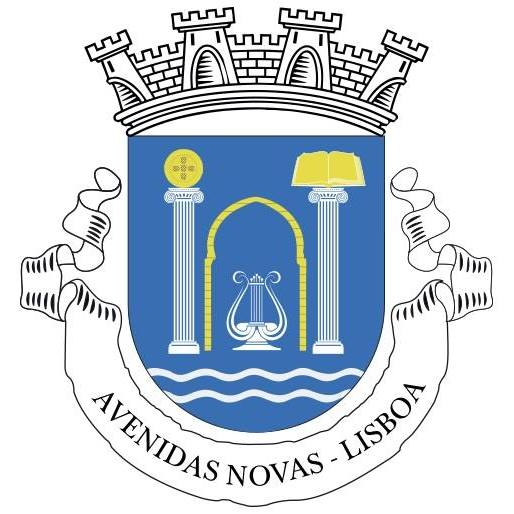
- Coat of arms

- Coordinates: 38.739°N 9.146°W
- Country: Portugal
- Region: Lisbon
- Metropolitan area: Lisbon
- District: Lisbon
- Municipality: Lisbon

Area
  - Total: 2.99 km^{2} (1.15 sq mi)

Population (2011)
  - Total: 21,625
  - Density: 7,230/km^{2} (18,700/sq mi)
- Time zone: UTC+00:00 (WET)
  - Summer (DST): UTC+01:00 (WEST)
- Patron: Our Lady of Fátima and Saint Sebastian
- Website: www.jf-avenidasnovas.pt

Avenidas Novas (Portuguese pronunciation: [ɐvɨˈnidɐʃ ˈnɔvɐʃ]) is a freguesia (civil parish) and district of Lisbon, the capital of Portugal. Located in central Lisbon, Avenidas Novas is to the south of Alvalade, west of Areeiro, east of Campolide, and north of Santo António. The population in 2011 was 21,625,

== History ==
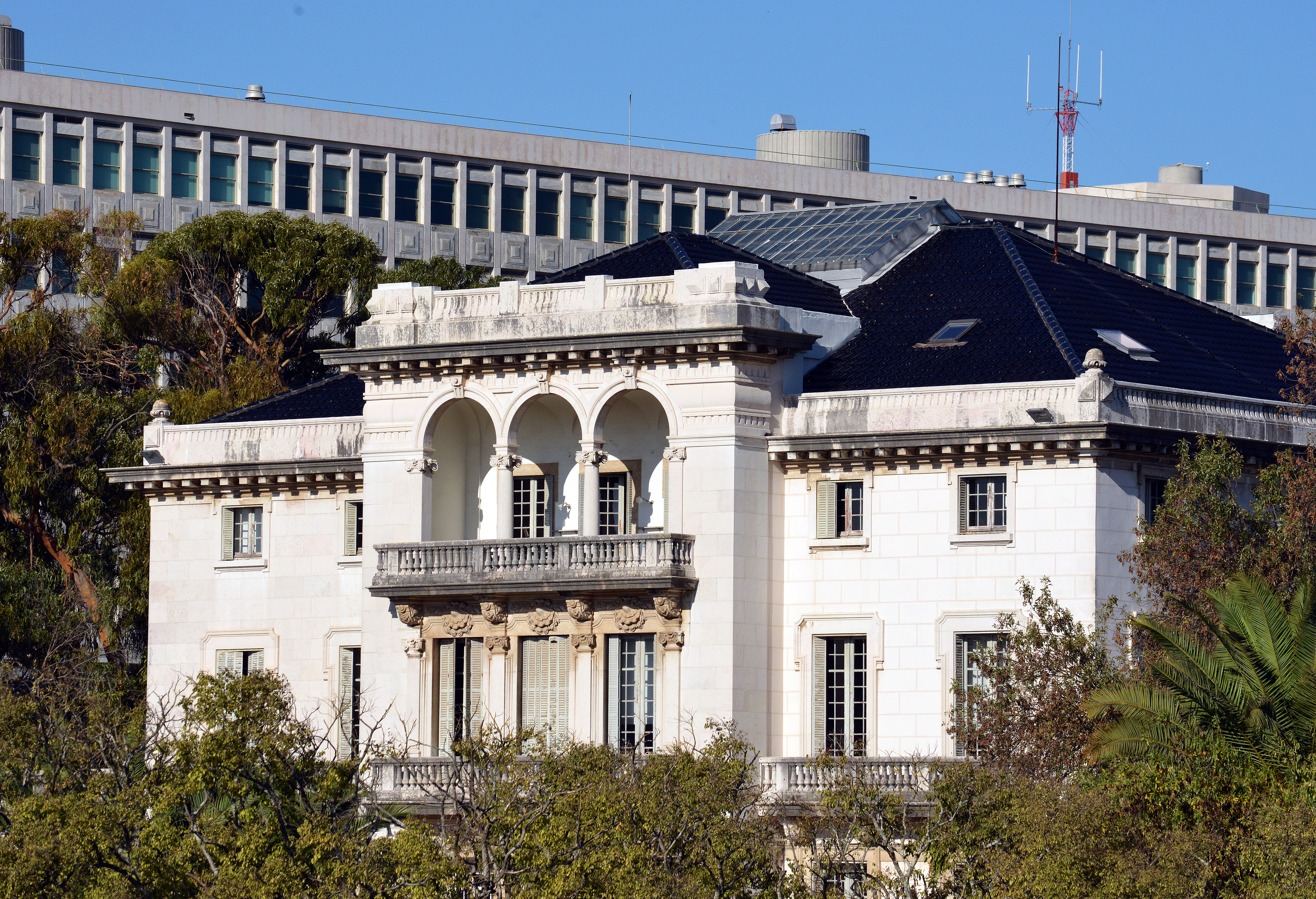
The Palacete Mendonça is both the residence of Prince Aga Khan IV and the global seat of the Ismaili Imamate.

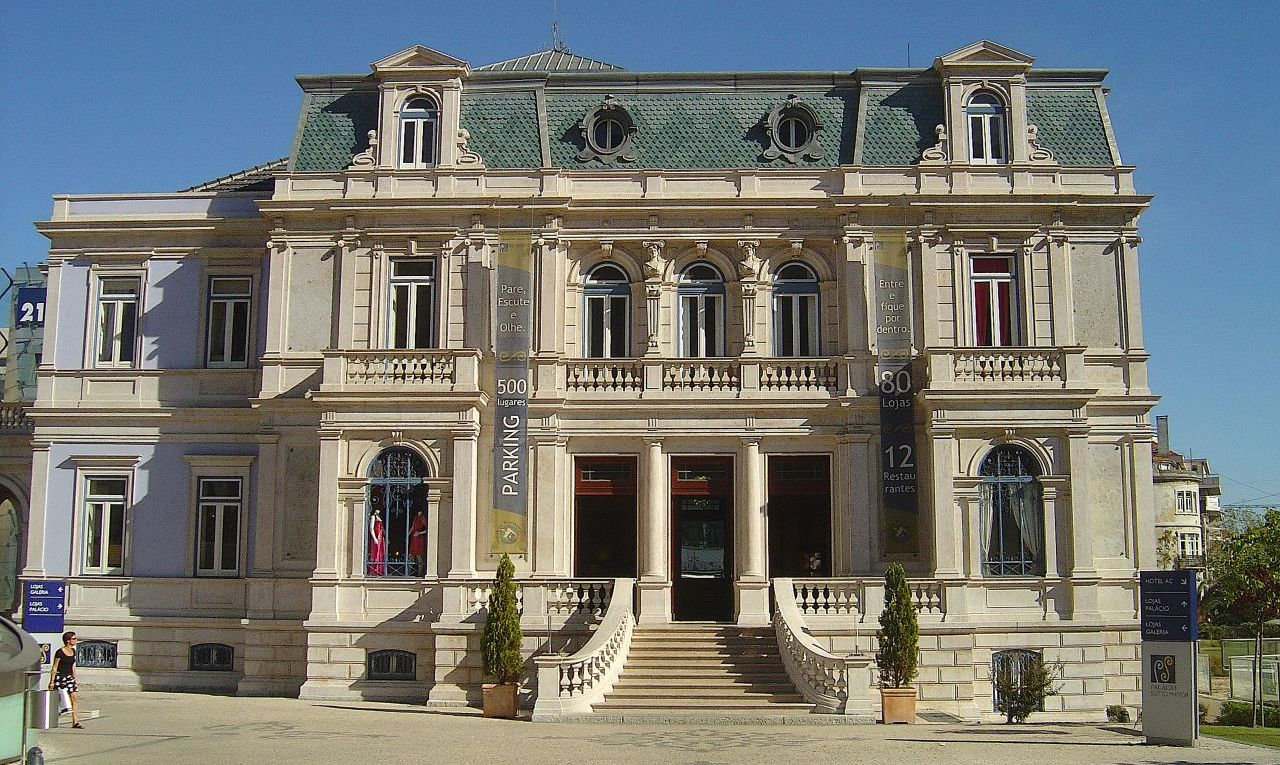
Sotto Mayor Palace.

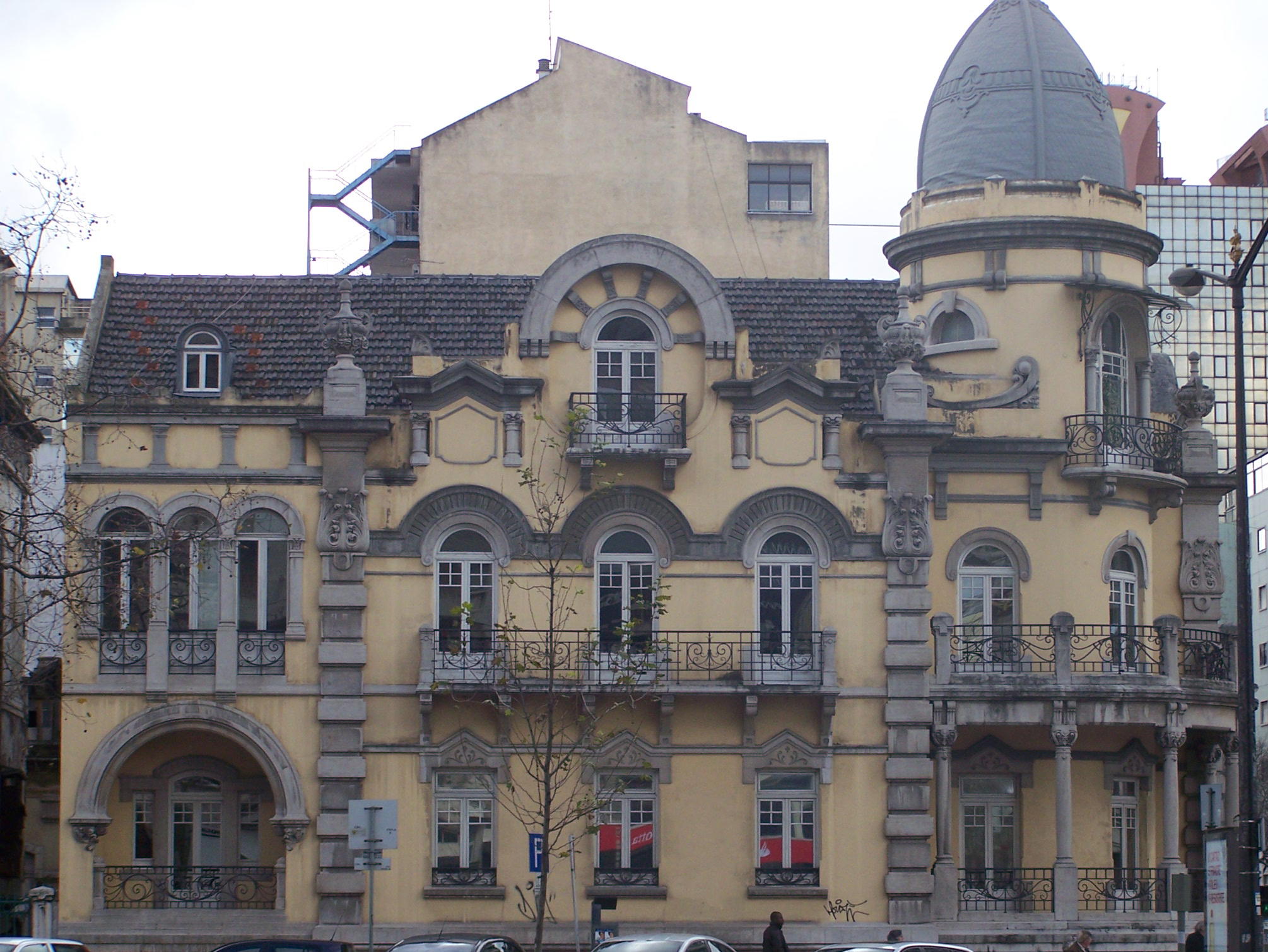
View of Avenida da República

"Avenidas Novas" was the known designation of Lisbon's expansion towards north by the end of the 19th century and first half of the 20th century, when several avenues connected the historical centre of the city with several places located nearby, that became part of the city limits. The avenues crossed mainly rural areas, allowing a significant urban expansion.

Edward VII Park was laid out in 1903.

The freguesia was created with the 2012 Administrative Reform of Lisbon, merging the former parishes of Nossa Senhora de Fátima and São Sebastião da Pedreira.

== Landmarks ==
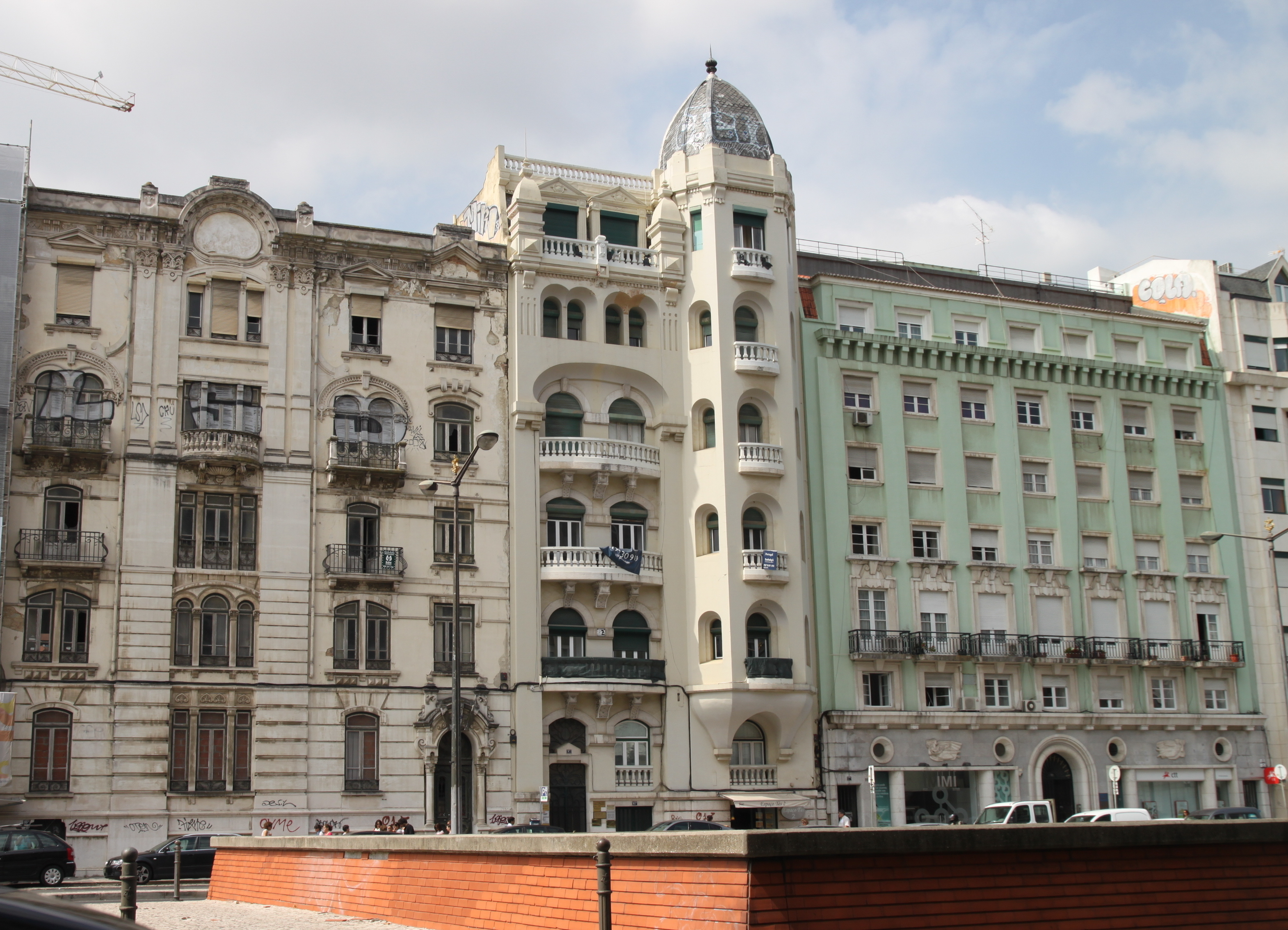
View of Avenida da República

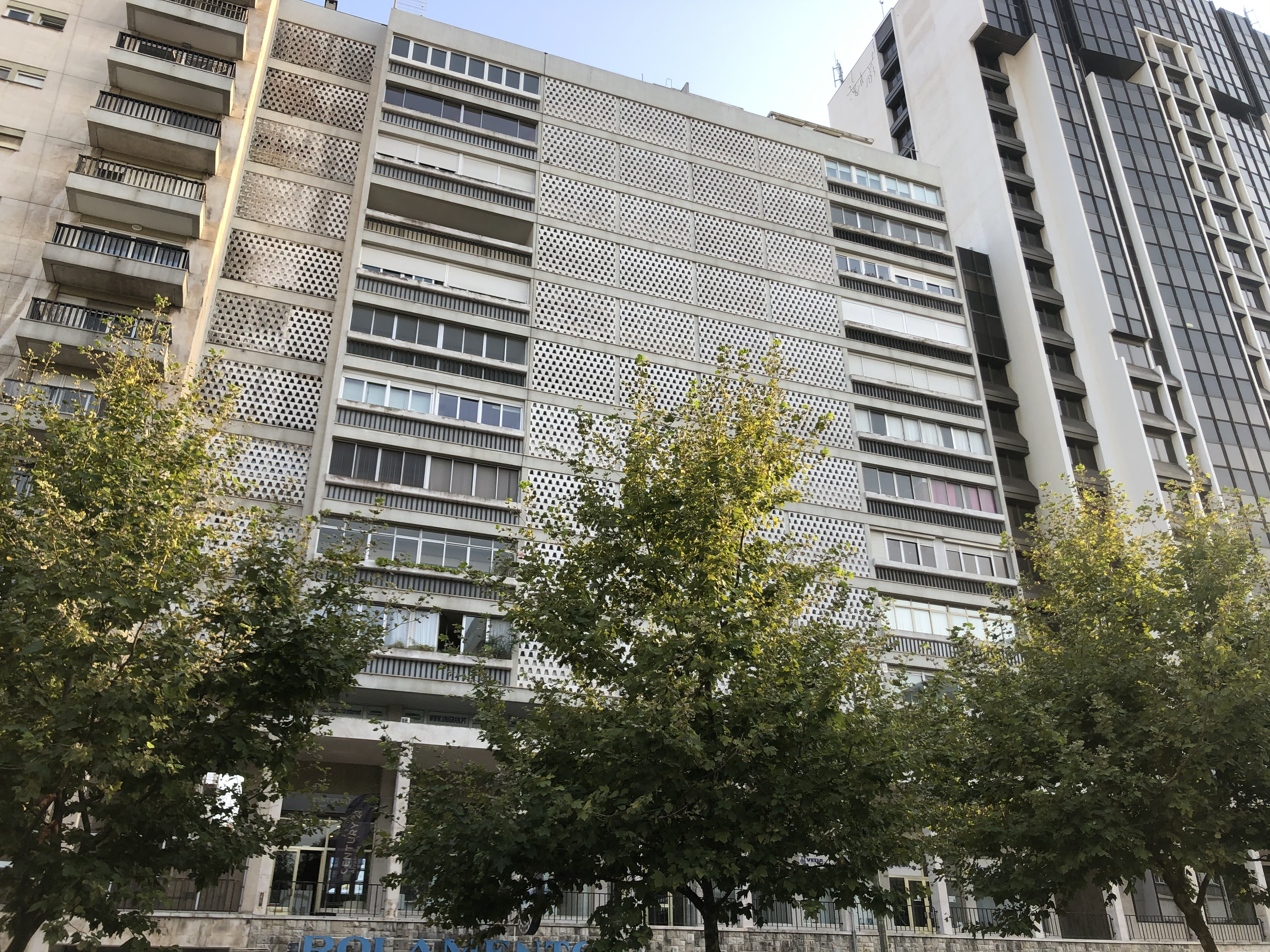
"América" building

- Edward VII Park
- Campo Pequeno Bullring
- Calouste Gulbenkian Museum
- Gulbenkian Park
- Hotel Ritz
- Galveias Palace
- Casa-Museu Dr. Anastácio Gonçalves
- Estufa Fria
- Church of Our Lady of the Rosary of Fátima
- Praça de Espanha
- São Bento Arch
