= Campo Pequeno Bullring =

Building in Lisbon, Lisbon District, Portugal

Campo Pequeno bullring
- Praça de Touros do Campo Pequeno
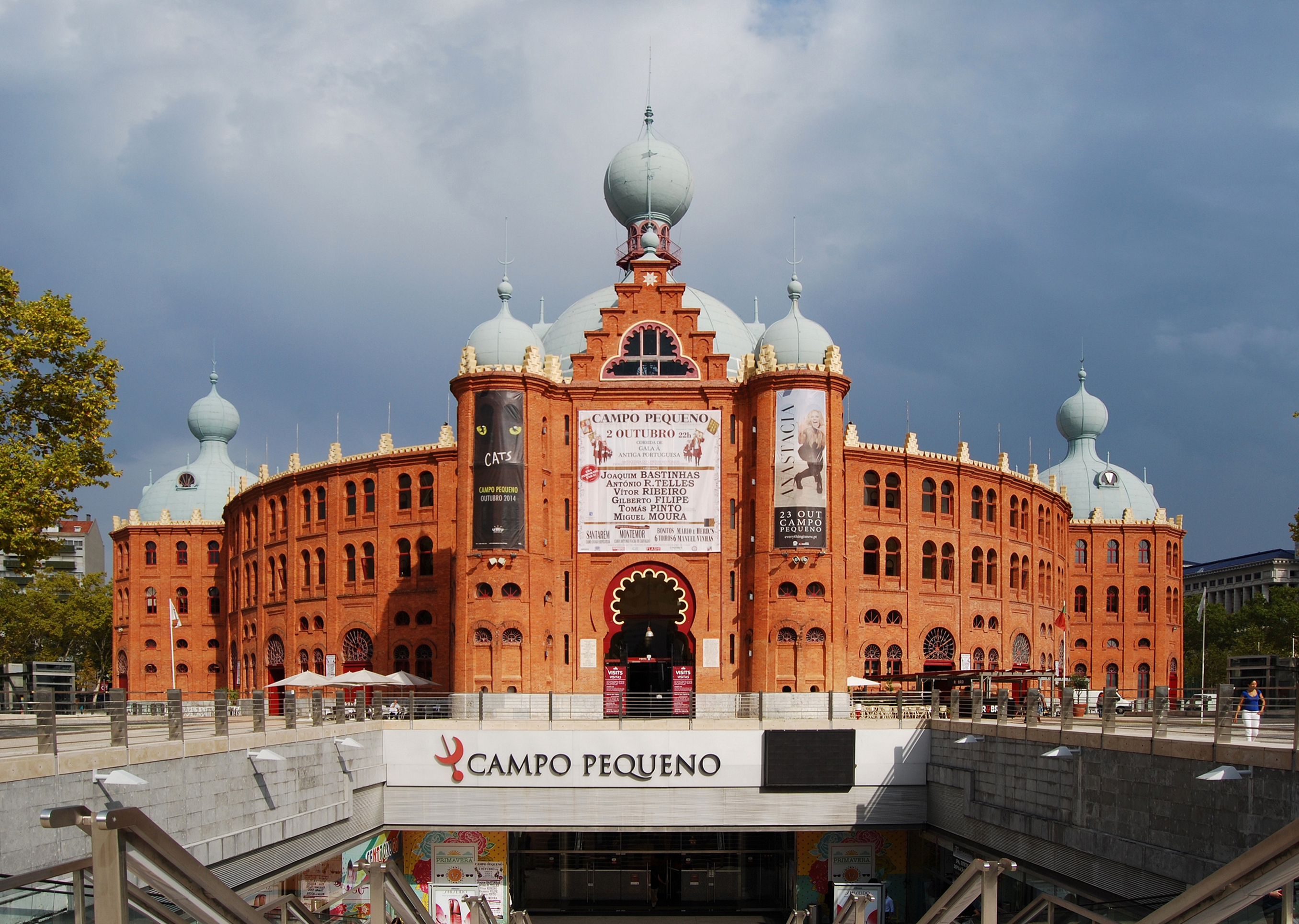
- Exterior of the venue
- Interactive map of Campo Pequeno bullring
- Location: Lisbon, Portugal
- Coordinates: 38°44′33″N 9°8′43″W
- Capacity: 6,848 (bullfighting); 10,000 (concerts)
- Type: Bullring

Construction
- Groundbreaking: 1890
- Opened: 1892; 134 years ago
- Renovated: 2006
- Architect: António José Dias da Silva

Website
- https://www.sagrescampopequeno.pt/

The Campo Pequeno Bullring (Portuguese: Praça de Touros do Campo Pequeno) is the current Praça de Touros of the city of Lisbon, in Portugal. It is located in Avenida da República, in Lisbon.

It is an enclosure for bull races, musical concerts, fairs, exhibitions and other events, with a capacity of around 10.000 people bearing 6.848 seats. The bullfighting agenda usually happens in the Summer and Spring seasons.

== History ==
The history of bullfighting comes back to the time where some kings were enthusiasts about this activity by facing the bull in public squares, either on horses or by feet.

In 1578, King Sebastian of Portugal ordered the erection of the first known bullring in Lisbon, in Xabregas. The other bullrings existing at the time in Lisbon were built in the 18th century in Junqueira, Belém, Anunciada and Salitre. According to documents of the Real Palace of Mafra dated from 1741, the first references to bull's races in Portugal were in Campo Pequeno's square. That's where was built a tiny square made out of wood with a reduced capacity for the public. The current bullring of Campo Pequeno succeeded the one existing in Campo de Santana. This one existed from 1831 until 1888 following an inspection that interdicted the building due to security issues related to the poor conservation status of the building. In the aftermath, on 19 February 1889 the Lisbon Town Hall conceded a piece of land to Casa Pia for the building of a new bull races space in Campo Pequeno. Casa Pia is the institution still responsible for the organisation of bull races in Lisbon. At the time though, due to financial complications, Casa Pia conceded the right of construction and exploration of that space to a private company for 90 years. After those years, the building should then be delivered back to the institution without any charges. The cost of the arena was 161 200$000 réis, paid by a group of Portuguese shareholders, who kept the property rights and the right to organise races for the referred period under the condition of paying Casa Pia an annual rent of 3500$000 réis. The building is classified as a Property of Public Interest, by Decree of 24 January 1983.

== The Public Arena on the 21st Century ==
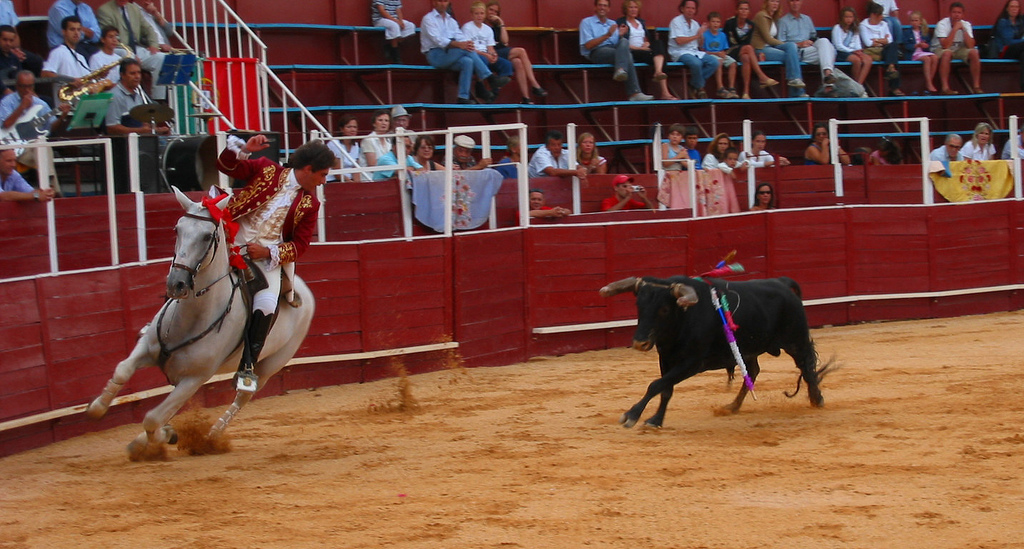
Portuguese bullfight

Constructed in visible solid brick from the outside, the Campo Pequeno square would come to be a target of a deep restoration work in the beginning of the 21st century. This square was inaugurated in 1892, with inspiration from Madrid's bullfight arena and projected in a neo-Arabic revivalist architecture. The museum integrates and evokes both the Portuguese bullfight history and national traditions. The bullring had its first ring structurally altered from the original brick arcs to solid brick. The exterior ring stood unaltered on a structural level, only being target of reparations and reinforcements. The most significant change was to the removable cover, that turns the square into a more versatile space, making it possible to use all year for different purposes.

The former Portuguese bullfighter Rui Bento Vasques directs the bullfighting activities since the opening of the square in 2006. There is a commercial gallery in the underground area of the square, today known as the Campo Pequeno shopping centre, as well as some commercial spaces on the ground floor, like bars and restaurants. The financing of the investment turned out to be too heavy for the exploration conditions of this space. In 2014, the debt was over 100 million euros, where 90 million were to the Portuguese Central Bank. The Renovation Society of Campo Pequeno was declared bankrupt in the same year.

In 2019, the businessman Álvaro Covões and the Horizon fund, from Pires de Lima and Sérgio Monteiro, won the selling contest and paid 37 million for the arena. Álvaro Covões is the concerts and shows promoter and Horizon fund is specialised in infrastructure management.

== Museum of Campo Pequeno ==
The museum of Campo Pequeno reopened in 2015, integrating a part of the old museum's assets and the Sector 1 bullfighting group. To this collection, other pieces were added, like the donations made by José Samuel Lupi, Francisco Mascarenhas and Joaquim Bastinhas. The space aims to create a memorial space of the Portuguese bullfighting tradition, as well as the publicity of the bullfighting culture in general to the public, valuing the immaterial heritage of it.

According to Diário de Notícias, since the inauguration and until February 2016, 11 thousand people from 94 different countries visited the museum. The visitors were mostly Portuguese and French people followed by German, Brazilian, Italian and Spanish visitors. There were also visitors from Iraq, Uganda and New Zealand, aged between 25 and 45 years old.

== The Architectural Project ==
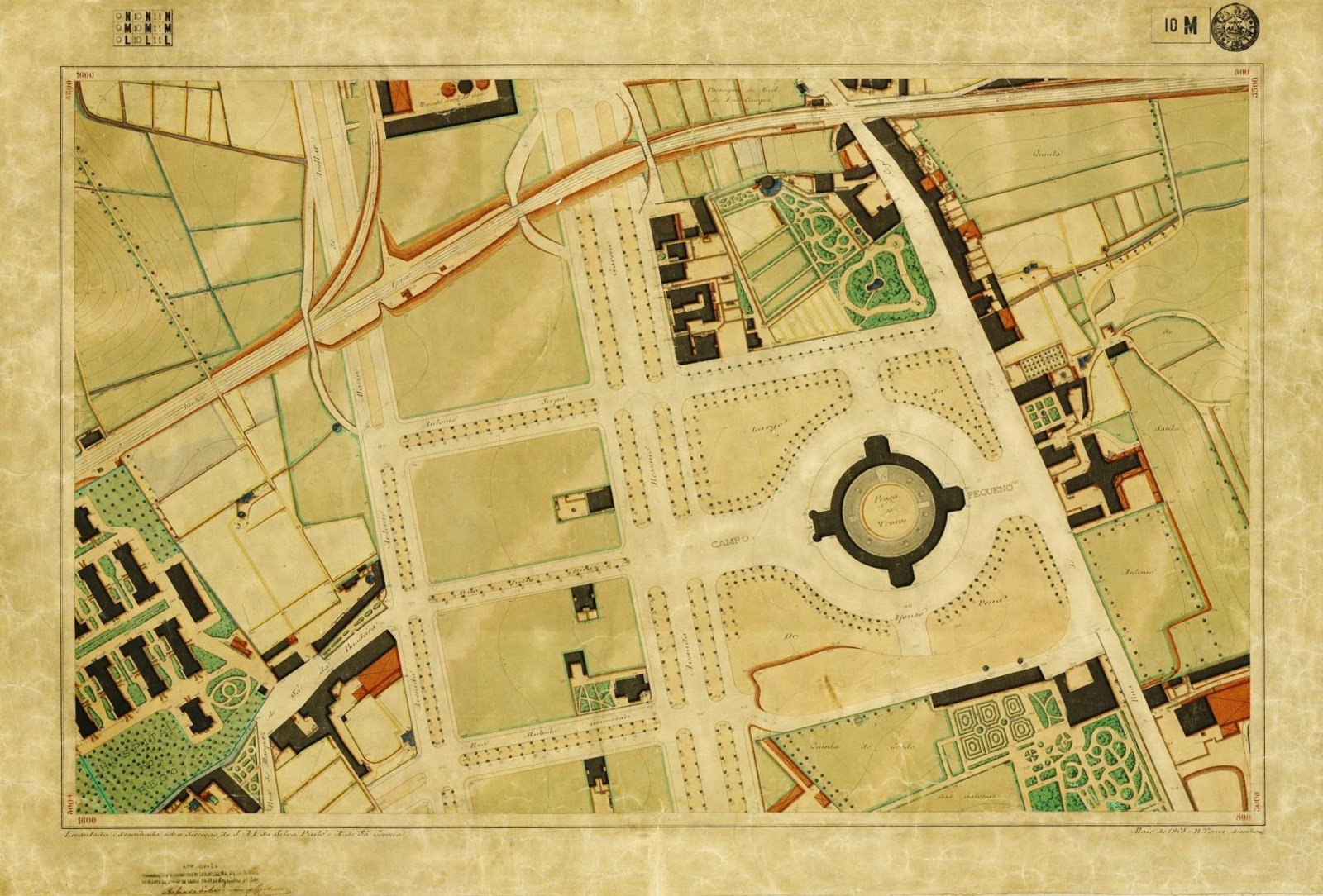
Plan of Lisbon, 1904-1911

The Campo Pequeno square was projected with an aim to improve the city of Lisbon, taking advantage of the empty spaces still existing in the 19th century and turning them into cosmopolitan areas. In 1889, the Lisbon's City Council approved the construction of the square, which would integrate the construction plan of the New Avenues neighbourhood, a project that aimed to expand the city of Lisbon up north. The purpose of these developments was to relieve the pressure of the 200.000 inhabitants that occupied the place up to Passeio Público, the current Restauradores Square.This new area would urbanise and connect different points of the city, with a progressive architectural plan and an eclectic style based on the creation of long avenues. These plans would make the biggest change in the city of Lisbon since the earthquake that devastated the city in 1755.

The choice to make the bullfight ring in this square has historical reasons, since there had been previously a bullfight ring there, more rudimental, constructed in wood and because Campo Pequeno was considered to be a public address.

It is relevant to note that Campo Pequeno was, before urban planning, a very rural space, only with a couple farms, a factory and one building – the Galveias Palace. In the 19th century, Lisbon was smaller and concentrated close to the river, but in 1885 a new city plan was adopted, deciding to expand the city up north, where Campo Pequeno is located.

== The Bullfight Ring ==
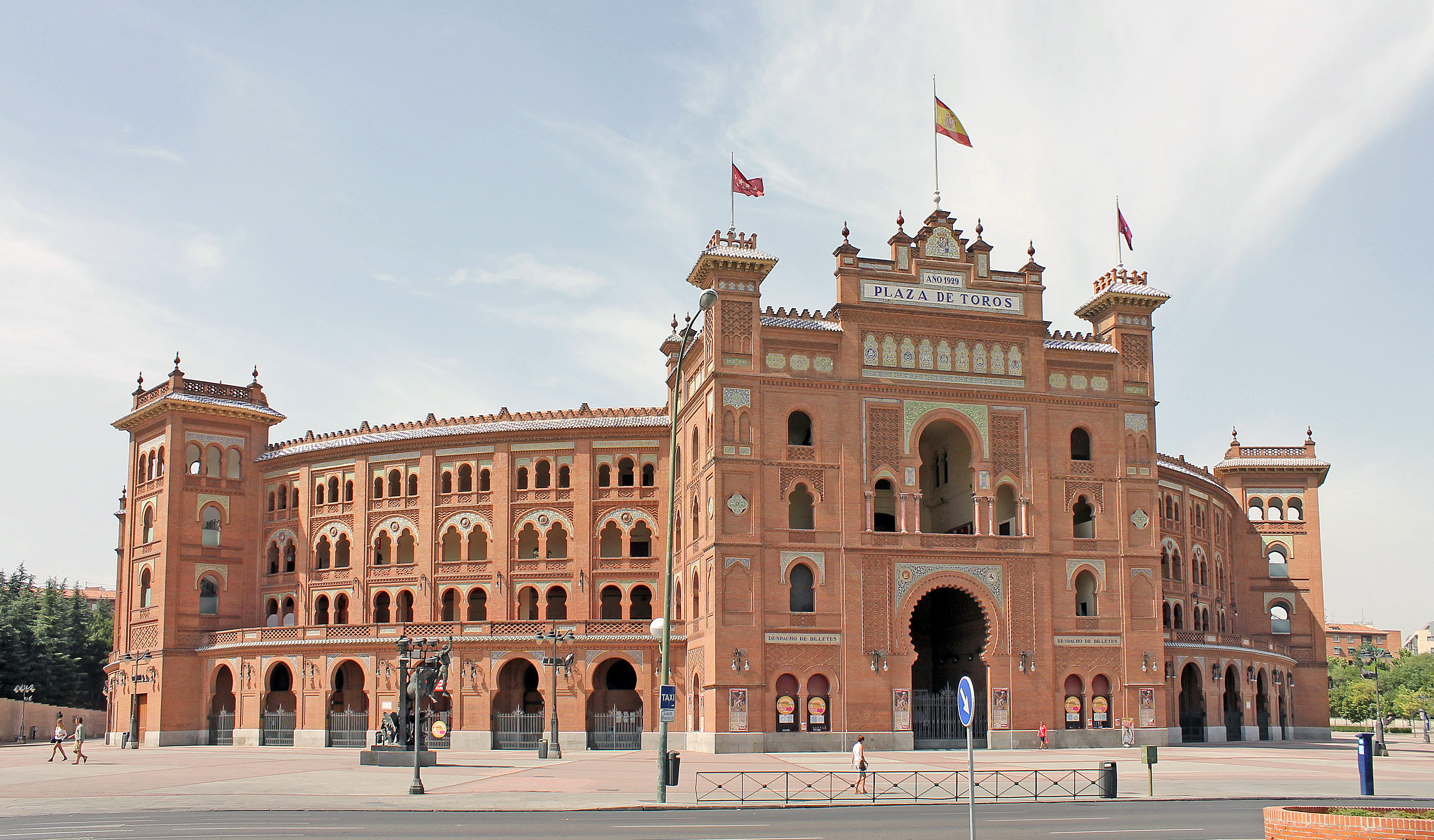
Plaza de Toros de Las Ventas, Madrid, Spain

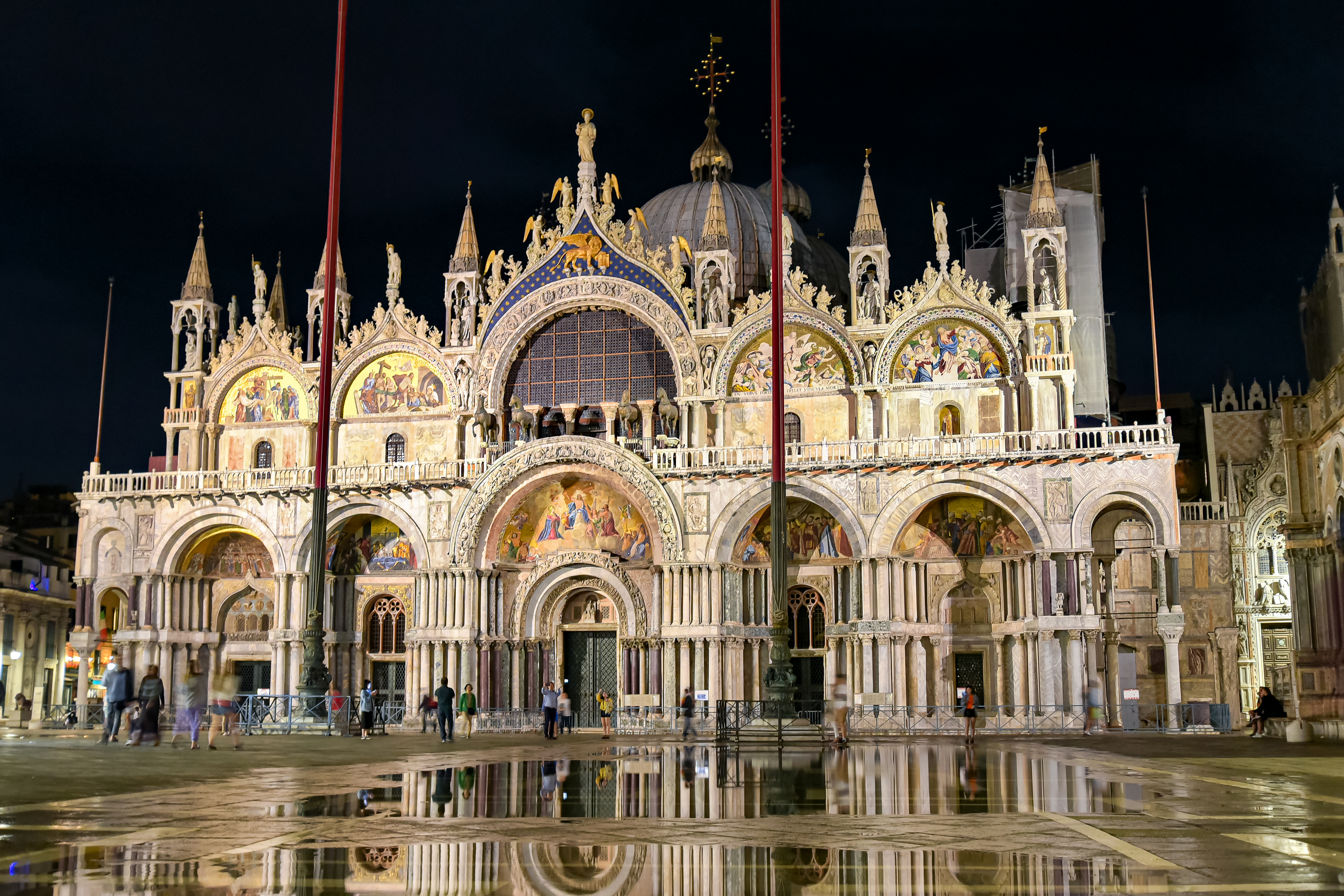
Basilica San Marco, Venezia, Italia

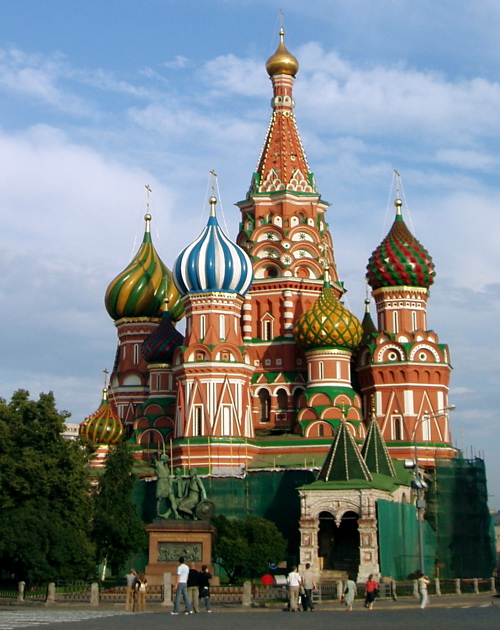
S. Basil's Cathedral, Moscow, Russia

The first project for the bullfight square is inspired by the one in Madrid, with a neo-mudéjar style. It was projected with an architectural Arabic style, like the one in Madrid. The Portuguese architect Dias da Silva is one of the main names behind the construction of this square, alongside Henrique Sabino dos Santos and the French contractor Emile Boussard. The construction of the square went according to Dias da Silva's project, using mainly brick but also metal (mainly on the domes), giving it a more modern and innovative look. The domes also had inspiration in the Byzantine, Russian and Hindo-Islamic architecture, having similarities with the St Mark's Basilica in Venice and with the S. Basil's Cathedral in Moscow.

The cultural and recreational architecture of the space is mostly inspired by the neo-Arab revivalist tendencies. The circular plan spectacle building has several turrets that boost the exterior, creating a counter-curve plan and helping, thus, to strengthen the stirrup arches that support the benches, between which there are dependencies and circulation corridors. It is built of brick, with the roofs in metal domes and topped by decorative stepped battlements.

The spans are either arched or traversed, accentuating the neo-Moorish character. Inside, there is an arena for shows, which is transformed into an arena with a removable roof, and at the base of the arena, a commercial gallery, all of recent execution. It is the most expressive building of the so-called neo-Arab style to be built in Lisbon in the late 19th century. Being a monochromatic building, the movement is given by the rhythm of the forms of the great number of openings in outdated arches and re-entrant frames, inspired by the vanished Plaza de Toros of Madrid (by Emilio Rodriguez Ayuso) which accentuates the Spanish neo-mudéjar revivalism.

this project aimed to attract investments, by the exceptionality of the architecture as well as to enrich Lisbon and turn it into a cosmopolitan city. Today, the New Avenues neighbourhood is an accessible area, with valued houses and a diversity of commerce, making it one of the most attractive neighbourhoods for Lisbon residents.

== Geotourism ==
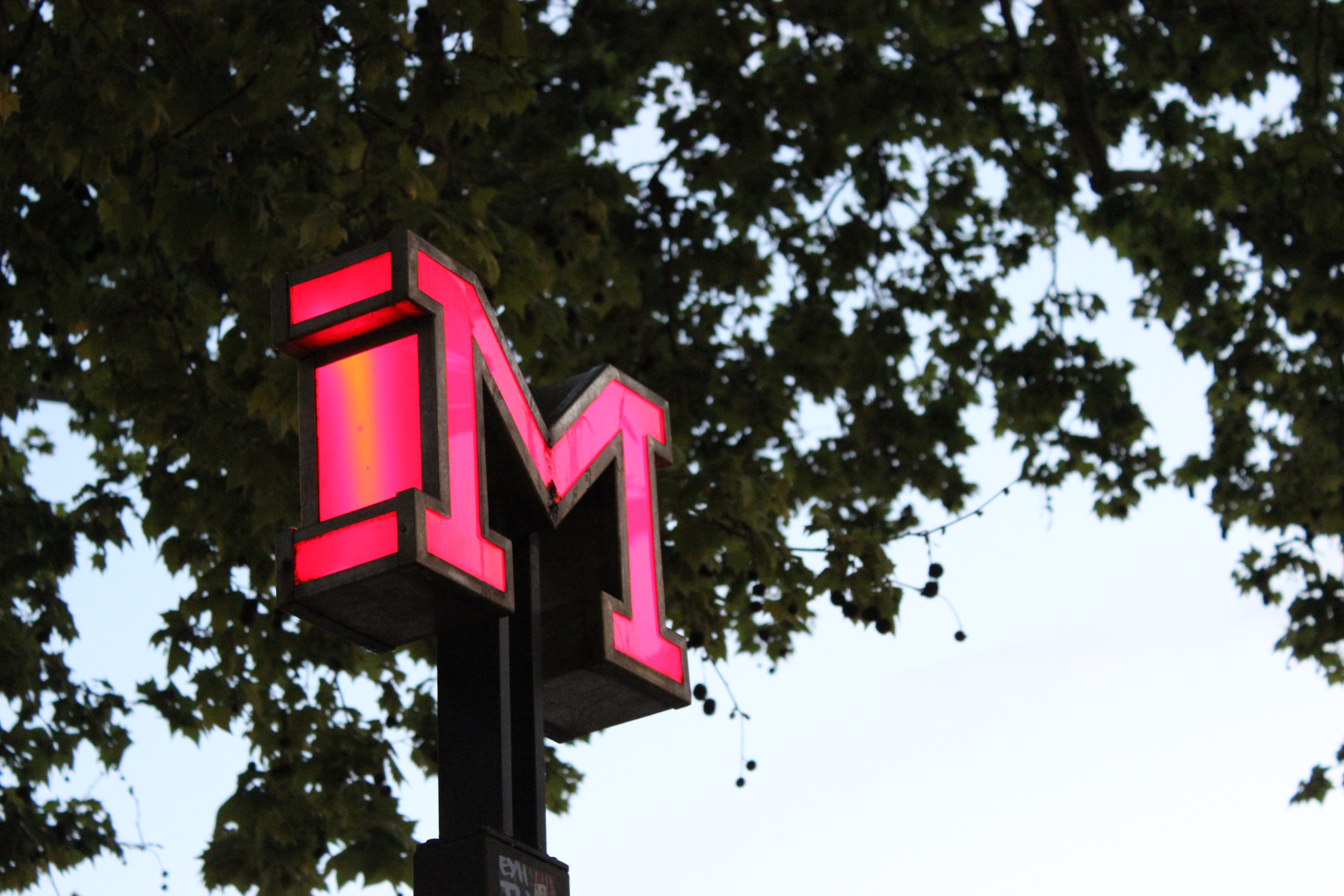
Campo Pequeno's Metro Station

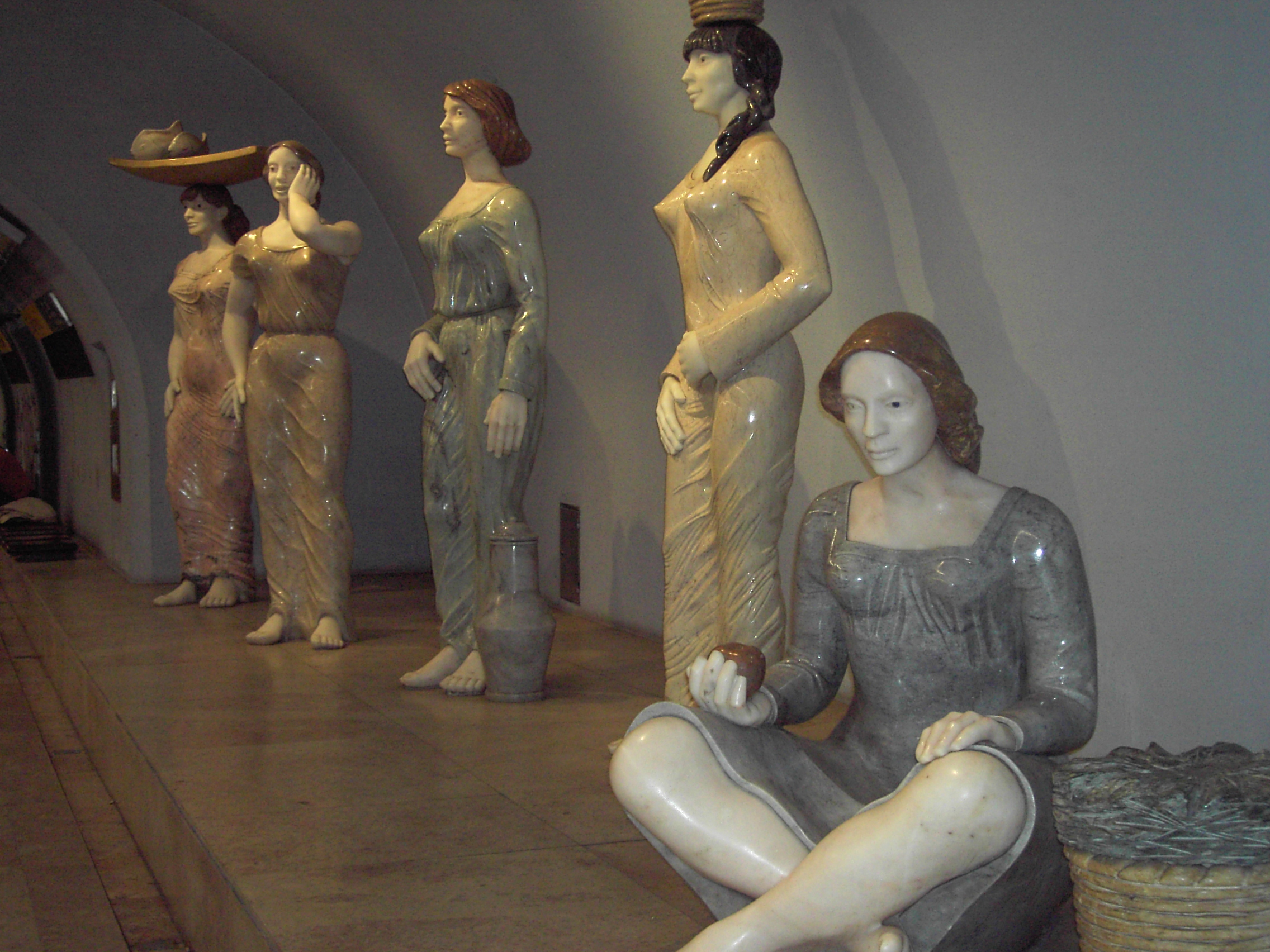
Statues inside Campo Pequeno's Metro Station

Geotourism can be defined as a micro-niche of the tourism market focused on the geological diversity of the destination site, with special attention given to sites of geological interest, the so-called geosites or cultural georesources. It is a touristic activity that tends to attract tourists of greater wealth, because it is practised on a smaller scale, is more flexible and therefore less invasive and more beneficial to local populations.

Any place can have potential for Geotourism, since all places have their own history of geological formation and none is formed in the same way.

We could just think of Lisbon and its seven hills. The urban environment has potential for attracting this type of tourism, as the vast majority of the population lives in urban centres and the heritage value of something that is physically close has more meaning to ordinary people than something that is hundreds of miles away in a remote place with difficult access. The urban dimension creates in people the desire for an escape from daily stress and, as a result, those who live in large population centres tend to travel more, as a way of getting away from it all and release the stress that comes with urban life.

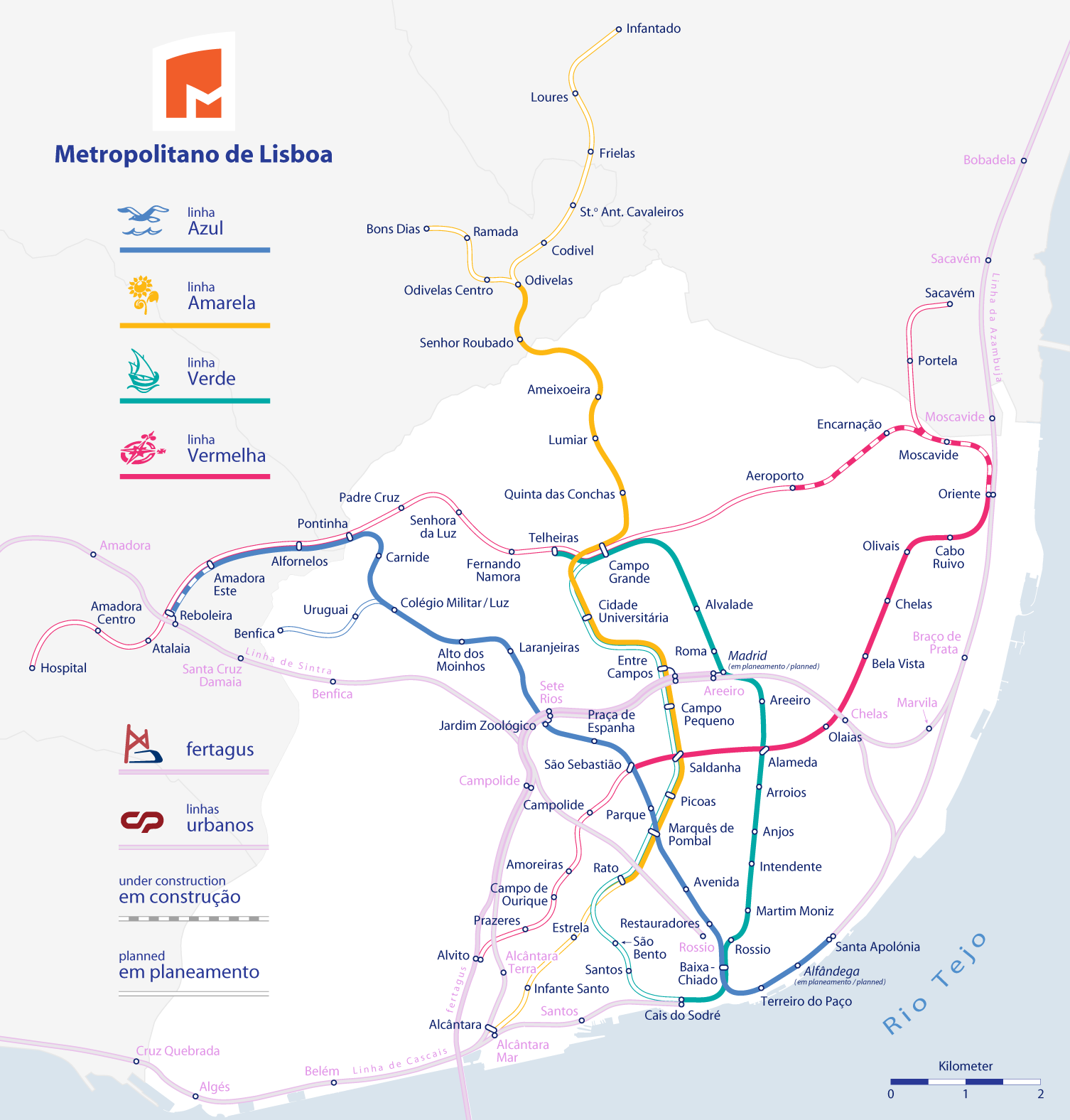
Lisboa's suburban and urban railway lines

The Lisbon subway is divided into 4 different lines - the Green, Red, Blue and Yellow. The Yellow Line where Campo Pequeno is located could almost be called the Stone line. That's where are located three of the most important stations in terms of richness, diversity and artistic work in natural stone: Campo Pequeno, Saldanha and Entrecampos. Here, art and geological heritage are intertwined and have stone work visible in the inlays from Campo Pequeno's metropolitan station.

== See also ==
- Portuguese-style bullfighting
