= Campo Pequeno Station =

Metro station in Lisbon, Portugal

Campo Pequeno
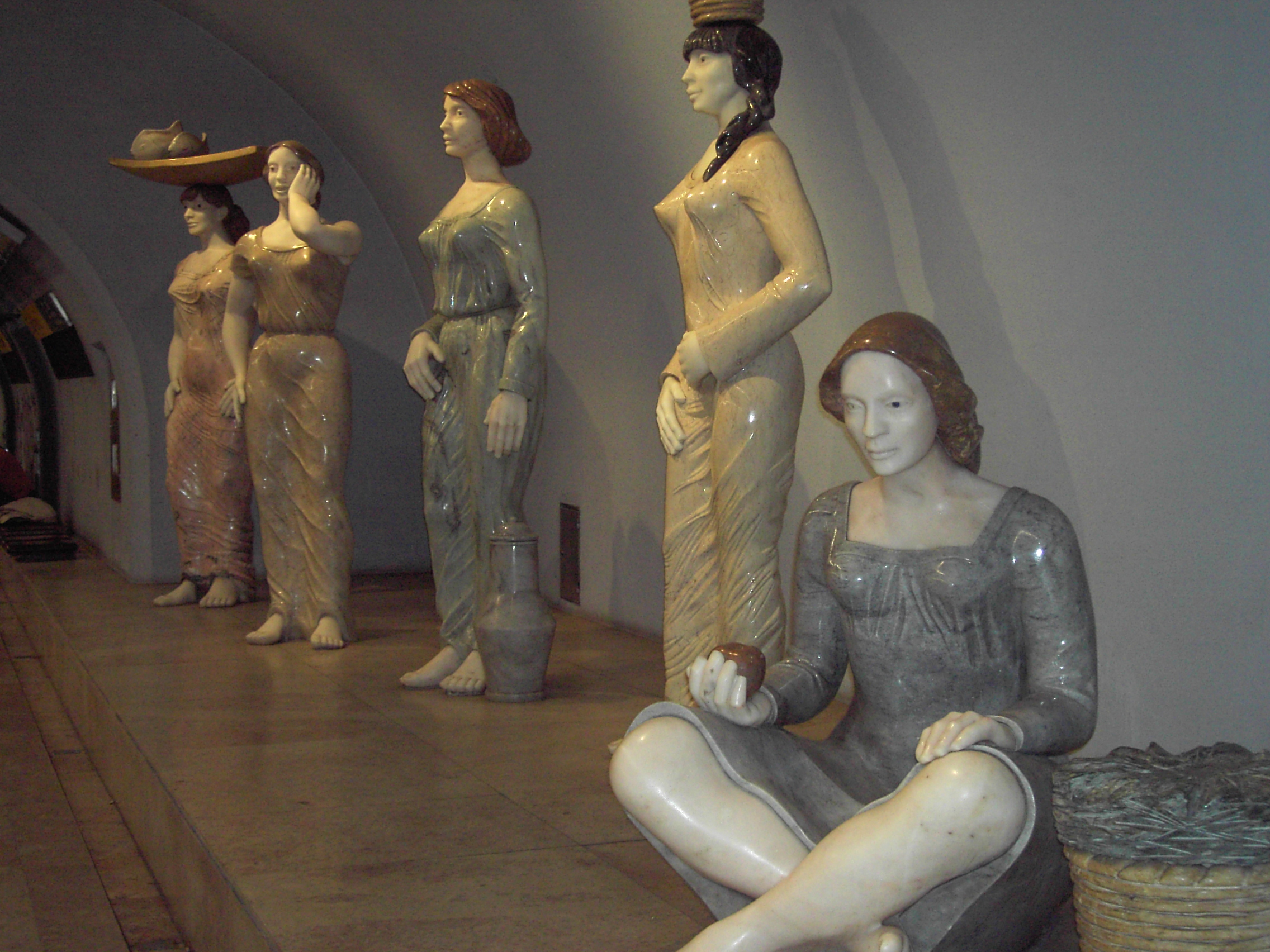

General information
- Location: Avenida da República, Lisbon; Portugal
- Coordinates: 38°44′30″N 9°8′48″W
- Owner: Government-owned corporation
- Operator: Metropolitano de Lisboa, EPE
- Line: Yellow Line
- Platforms: 2 side platforms
- Tracks: 2

Construction
- Structure type: Underground
- Accessible: No
- Architect: Falcão e Cunha

Other information
- Station code: CP
- Fare zone: L

History
- Opened: 29 December 1959 (66 years ago)
- Rebuilt: 26 March 1979 (47 years ago); 29 December 1994 (31 years ago)

Services
Preceding station	Lisbon Metro	Following station
Entre Campos towards Odivelas	Yellow Line	Saldanha towards Rato
Route map
Location

Campo Pequeno station is part of the Yellow Line of the Lisbon Metro.

== History ==
It is one of the 11 stations that belong to the original Lisbon Metro network, opened on 29 December 1959. This station is located on Avenida da República and takes its name from the nearby Campo Pequeno square and bullring.

The architectural design of the original station is by Falcão e Cunha. On 26 March 1979 the station was extended, based on the architectural design of Benoliel de Carvalho. On 29 December 1994 the station was refurbished, based on the architectural design of Duarte Nuno Simões and Nuno Simões.

== Connections ==
=== Urban buses ===
==== Carris ====
- 207 Cais do Sodré ⇄ Fetais
- 727 Estação Roma-Areeiro ⇄ Restelo - Av. das Descobertas
- 736 Cais do Sodré ⇄ Odivelas (Bairro Dr. Lima Pimentel)
- 738 Quinta dos Barros ⇄ Alto de Santo Amaro
- 744 Marquês de Pombal ⇄ Moscavide (Quinta das Laranjeiras)
- 749 ISEL ⇄ Estação Entrecampos
- 754 Campo Pequeno ⇄ Alfragide
- 756 Olaias ⇄ Rua da Junqueira
- 783 Amoreiras (Centro Comercial) ⇄ Portela - Rua Mouzinho de Albuquerque

==== Aerobus ====
- Linha 2 Aeroporto ⇄ Sete Rios

== See also ==
- List of Lisbon metro stations
