= Casa-Museu Dr. Anastácio Gonçalves =

Museum-Residence of Dr. Anastácio Gonçalves
- Casa-Museu Dr. Anastácio Gonçalves
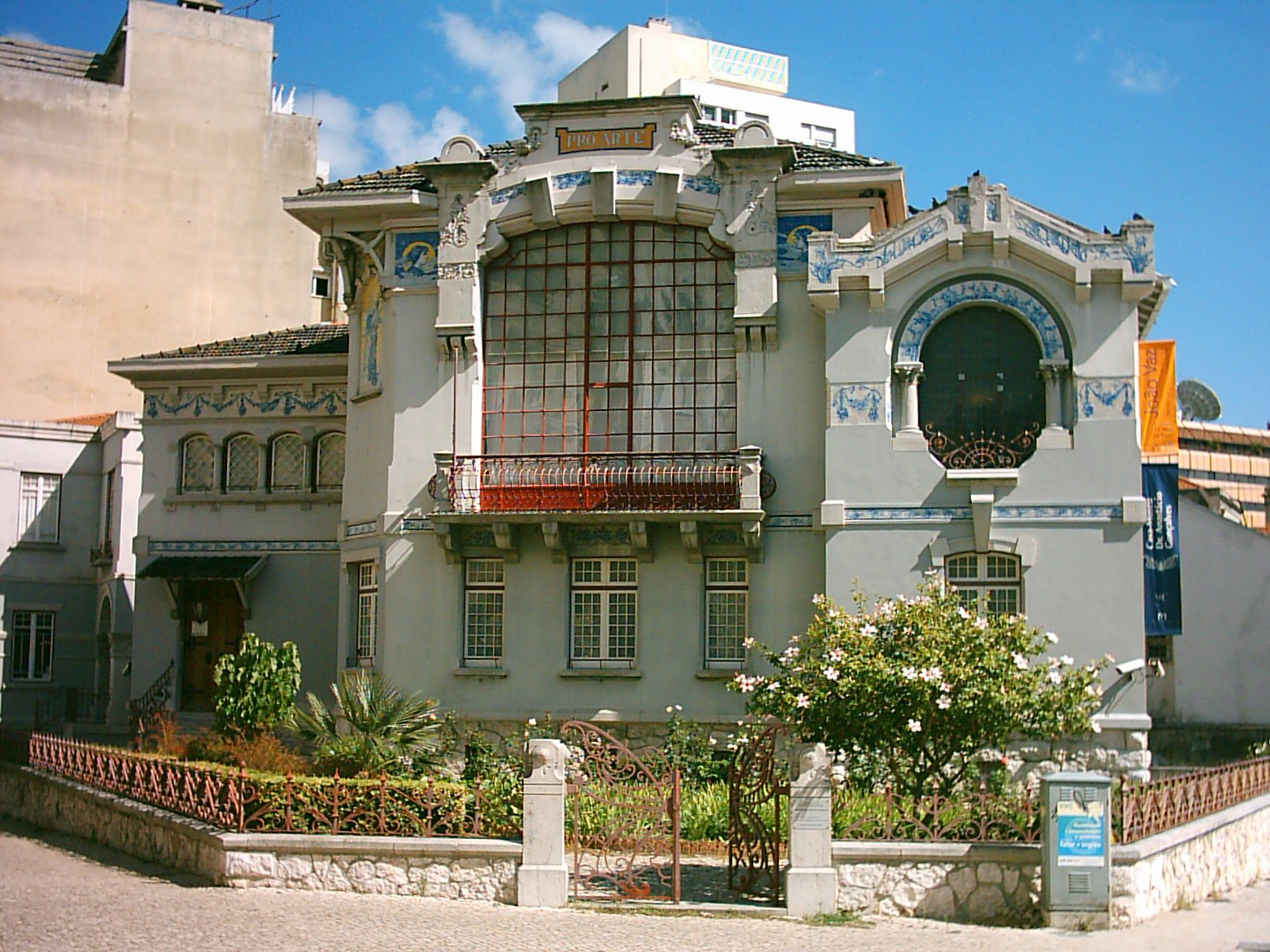

General information
- Type: Residence/Museum
- Architectural style: Art Nouveau
- Location: Avenidas Novas, Lisbon, Portugal
- Coordinates: 38°43′57.3″N 9°08′47.1″W
- Opened: 20th century
- Owner: Portuguese Republic

Technical details
- Material: Masonry

Design and construction
- Architect: Manuel Joaquim Norte Júnior

Website
- Official Site

The Museum-Residence of Dr. Anastácio Gonçalves (Portuguese: Casa-Museu Dr. Anastácio Gonçalves) is a former residential home built in the Art Nouveau style that has been converted into a museum of nineteenth-century Portuguese painting and of Art Nouveau art and artifacts. It is located in the civil parish of Avenidas Novas, in the municipality and Portuguese capital of Lisbon.

In the summer of 2019, the Museum closed for renovation works.

== History ==
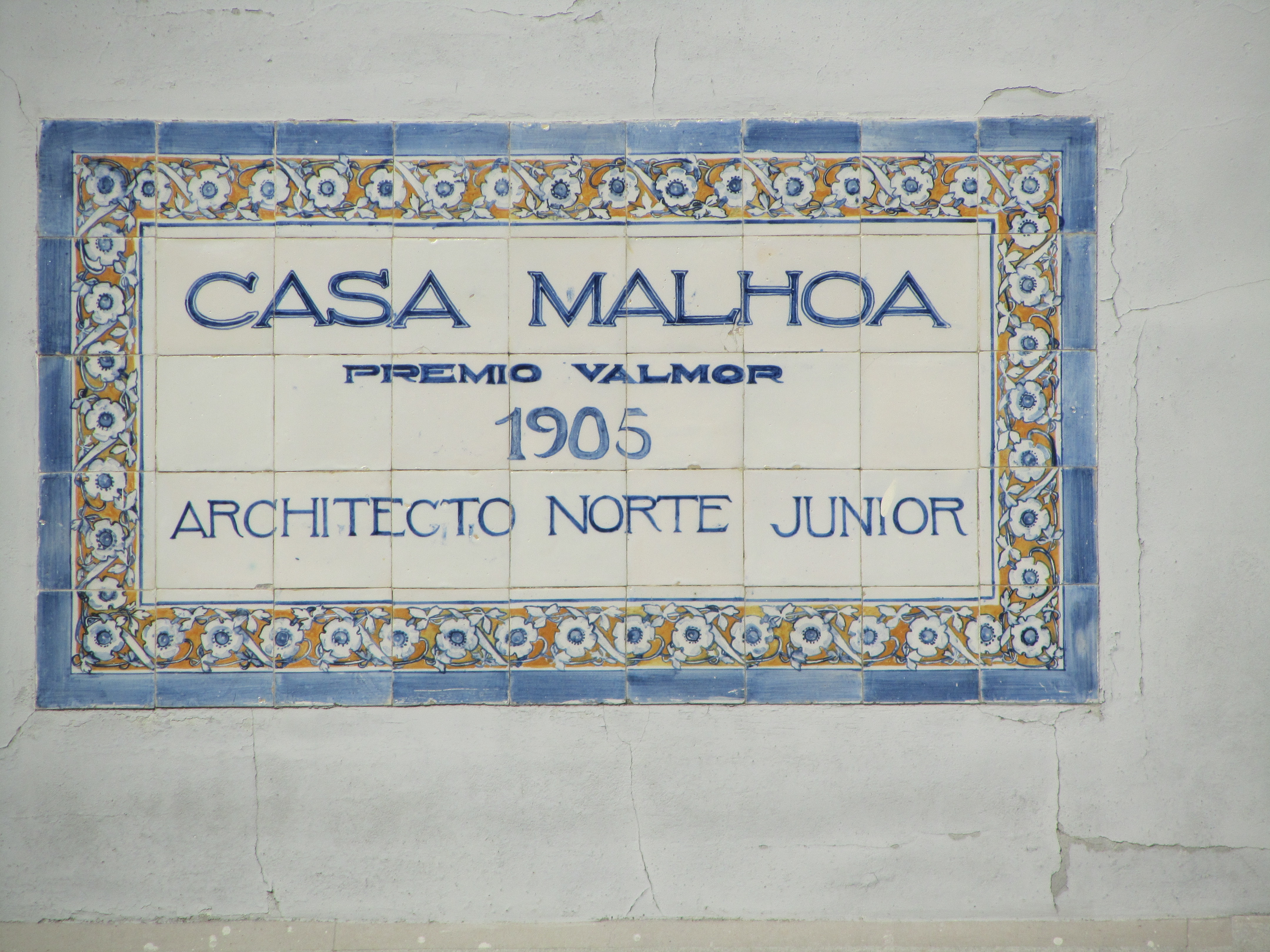
The Casa da Malhoa referencing the former owners: José Victor Branco Malhoa

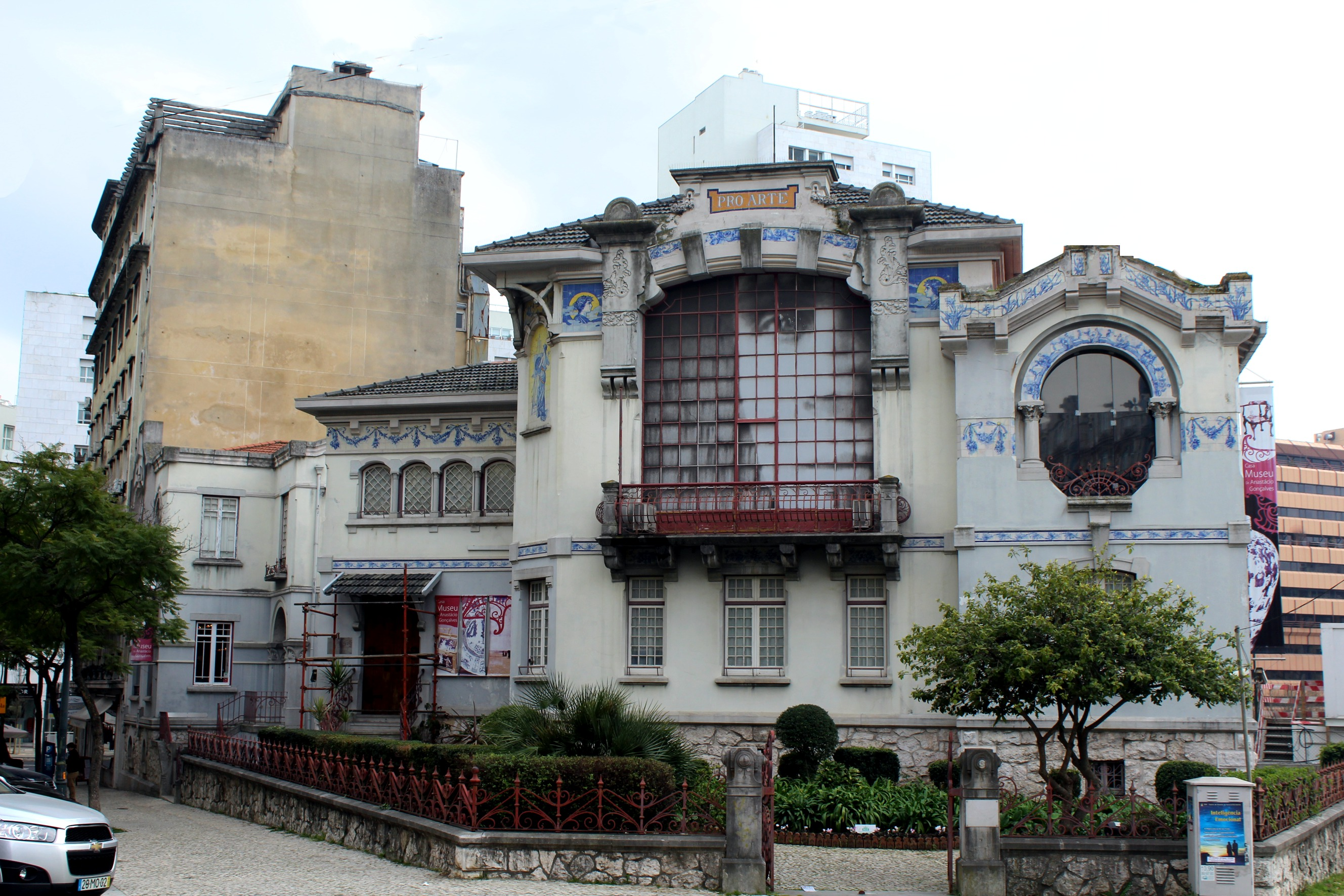
A view of the former house of Dr. Anastácio Gonçalves

In 1904, José Victor Branco Malhoa petitioned the municipal authority of Lisbon to construct a residence and atelier, based on a project by Manuel Joaquim Norte Júnior (1878–1962). The March 1904 project was given to constructor Frederico Augusto Ribeiro, what was then known as the Lar-Oficina Pro-Arte. As part of the late-18th century eclecticism, the design crossed many decorative elements of the Art Nouveau, that were brought into the Portuguese residence from the Parisian school. The building suffered various alterations over time, since November 1904, with inclusion of a secondary floor and basement. The serene modernity of the home was appreciated by José Malhoa, who hoped to win the Prémio Valmor, an award that (despite his fears that the opposition, Ventura Terra and Adães Bermudes) would be attributed to him. The final design won a Prémio Valmor in 1905, composed of a jury that included José Luís Monteiro (CML), José Alexandre Soares (ARBA) and Arnaldo Redondo Adães Bermudes (SPA).

The house was sold following the death of Malhoa's wife in 1919; Malhoa moved to a home in Praça da Alegria. Between 1919 and 1932, the house had new two new owners, including merchant Dionísio Vasques, before being acquired by the ophthalmologist Dr. Anastácio Gonçalves, a great collector of artworks. At his death (1965), the house and all its artefacts were left to the State, in order to create a museum (similar to the Soane Museum in London). Title was eventually transferred to the State in 1967. It was only in 1971 when a commission was set up to inventory, analyze and select artworks from the home for redistribution to museums and sale.

After incorporated by the State, in 1969, work on the home was undertaken, until it was classified as a Property of Public Interest (Imóvel de Interesse Público) (in 1982). In 1980, the home was reopened to the public as museum. In 1987, with plans to expand the MAG, work began on remodelling the old Casa António Pinto da Fonseca Mota (along the Rua Pinheiro Chagas) with objective of merging it with the Casa Malhoa. It was later (9 August 1991) transferred to the Instituto Português de Museus (Decree 278/91; Diário da Repúblic, Série-1A).

The contiguous building (also designed by Norte Junior) was annexed in 1996 to museum, undertaken by Frederico and Pedro George, in order to expand the surface area and establish a shop, cafeteria and spaces for temporary expositions.

On 29 March 2007, the property was transferred to the Instituto dos Museus e Conservação, I.P. (Decree 97/2007; Diário da República, Série 1, 63).

== Architecture ==
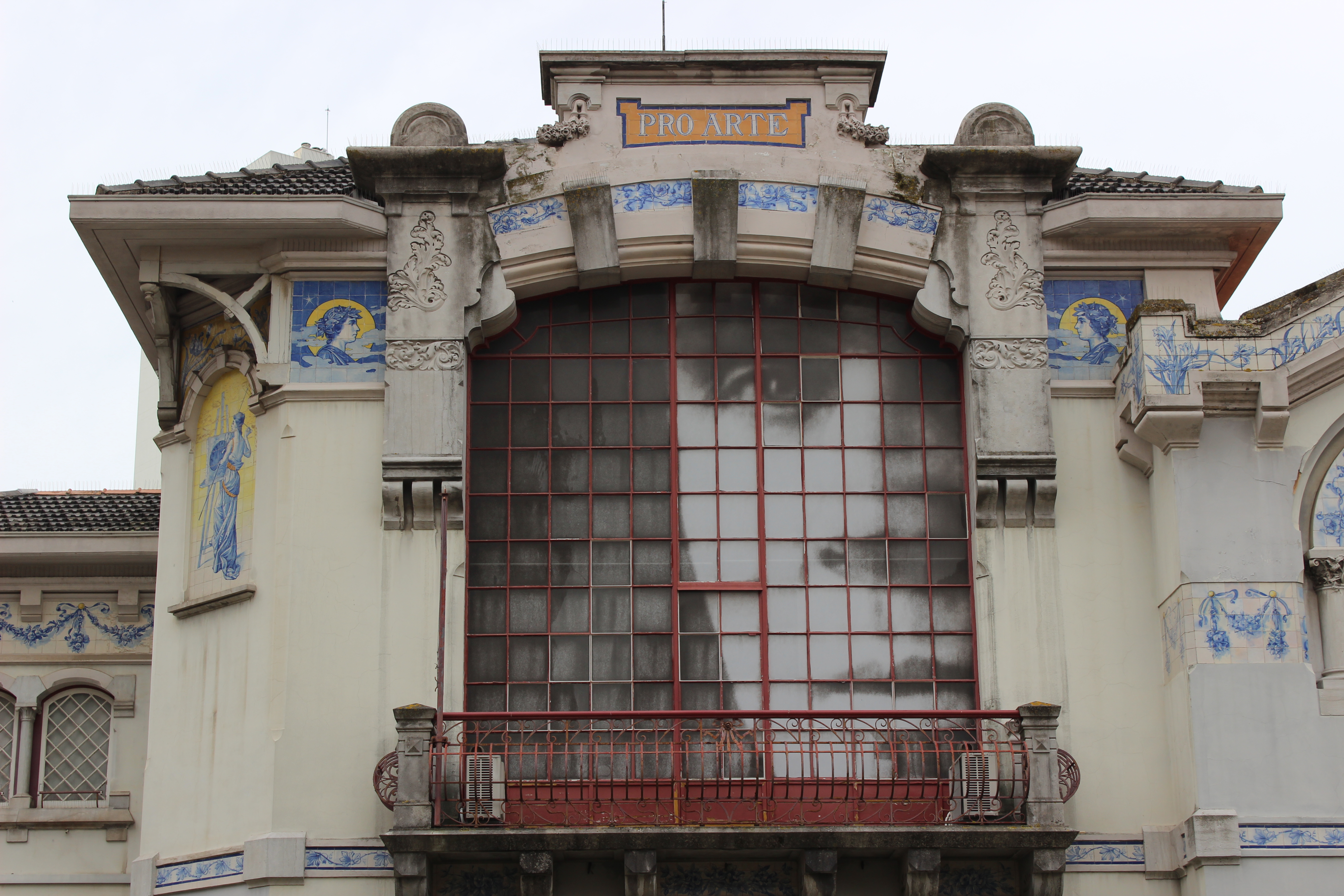
The main window on the front facade with inscription PROARTE

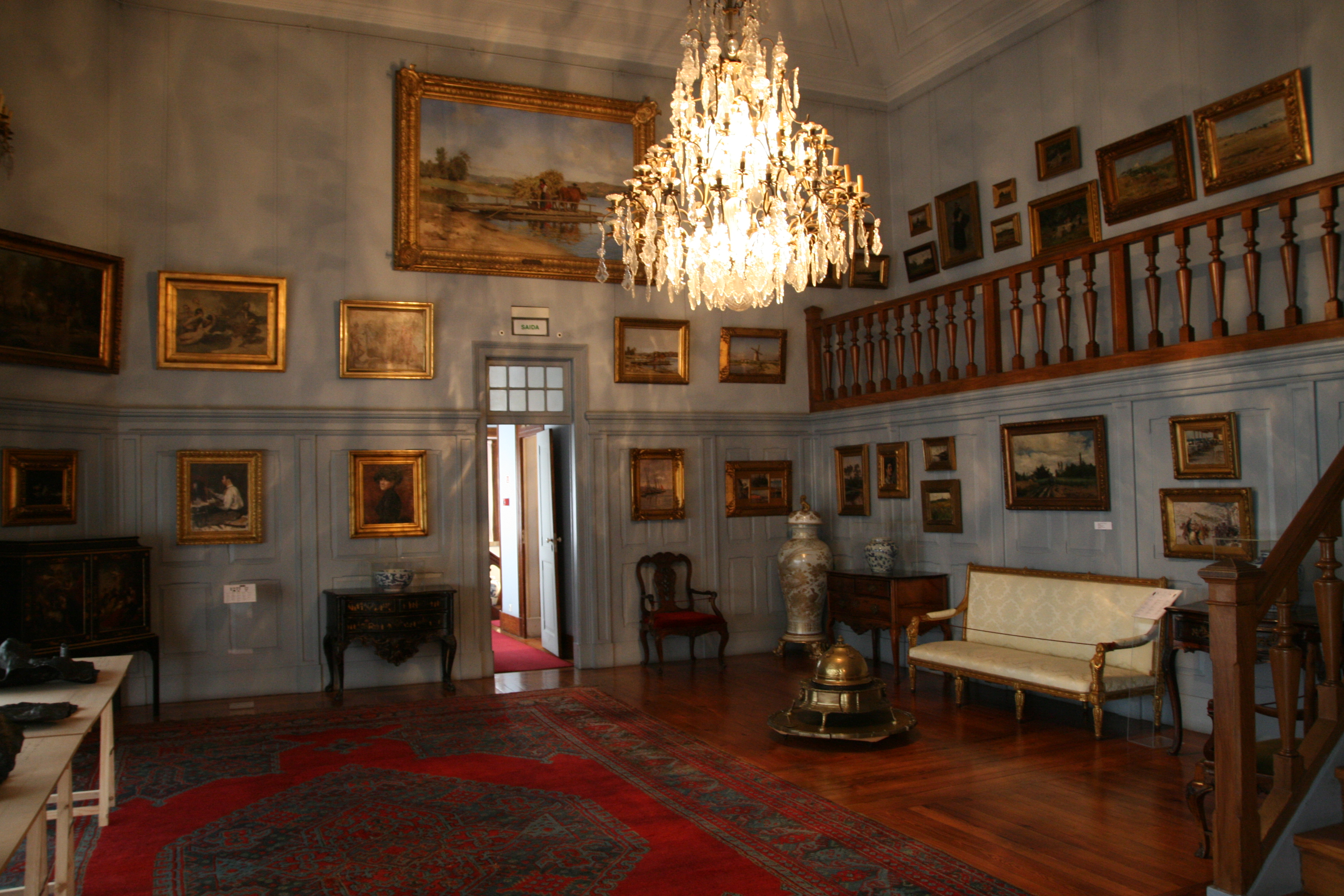
The interior of the vintage 16th-17th century residence

The building is situated a corner of a residential block (at the corner of Rua 5 de Outubro and Rua Pinheiro Chagas in the Bairro de Picoas), with walled garden near the Maternidade Dr. Alfredo da Costa.

The plan is an irregular 2-story design with three wings and a tiled roof. Its exterior design includes various irregular fenestrations on differentiated facades that are duplicated in the lateral and rear faces.

On the first floor of the central block are four rectangular windows, while the second floor includes one large window on corbels with iron grating. Above the curved window, with three accented voussoirs crowned by a rectangular block and tabulature. Below the window is a platform on six corbels with ironwork. The lateral left wing, which is recessed from the main facade, includes a staircase access to the principal rectangular door. On the second floor of this wing are small windows with stone bows. Corbels support the cornices and protruding eaves. The lateral right wing, which is light protruding, includes a rounded corner window with accented voussoir, supporting the a corbel for the upper window. This second floor includes a curved arched with inset curvilinear window flanked by two columns. This wing is crowned by gable roof with robust frame and accented voussoir. A frieze of azulejo marks the division between the first and second floors on various registers of the facades, consisting of blue and white figures and floral patterns. In the rear some in yellow. The central body is crowned by azulejo frieze with yellow and white PROARTE plaque. On the lateral right facade is a 45 azulejo tiles with the following inscription lined with artistic border: CASA MALHOA / PREMIO VALMOR / 1905 / ARCHITECTO NORTE JUNIOR. This is the unique azulejo plaque or reference that highlights the Prémio Valmor award. Sculptures on the facade are by António Augusto Costa Mota, while all the ironworks were forged by Norte Júnior and executed by the carpenter Vicente Joaquim Esteves, with several masonic elements.

Inside the building, the furniture and decorative pieces are arrange as a residential home. All the furniture and artefacts are consistent with the 17th-18th century style, punctuated by Portuguese natural wall art and collection of Chinese porcelain. Also, on the second floor, in the area used as the former-atelier, is a window with fabulous window with vegetal decoration in the Arte Nova (consisting of orchids and hummingbirds). Similar to the external decorative elements that unify the house the internal structures are defined by azuelejo friezes (authored by José António Jorge Pinto, liberal interpretations of José Victor Branco Malhoa and António Ramalho), transposed to fresco paintings by João Eloy Amaral.
