= São Sebastião da Pedreira =

- Civil parish
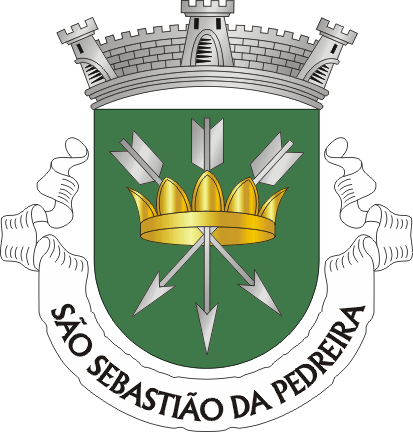
- Coat of arms

- Location in Portugal
- Coordinates: 38.73°N 9.15°W
- Country: Portugal
- Region: Lisbon
- Metropolitan area: Lisbon
- District: Lisbon
- Municipality: Lisbon
- Disbanded: 2012

Area
  - Total: 1.05 km^{2} (0.41 sq mi)

Population (2001)
  - Total: 5,871
  - Density: 5,590/km^{2} (14,500/sq mi)
- Time zone: UTC+00:00 (WET)
  - Summer (DST): UTC+01:00 (WEST)
- Website: http://www.jf-sspedreira.pt/

São Sebastião da Pedreira (English: Saint Sebastian of the Quarry) was a Portuguese Catholic parish (freguesia) in the municipality of Lisbon dedicated to the early Christian martyr Saint Sebastian and named "of the Quarry" due to nearby stone quarries.

With the 2012 Administrative Reform, the former São Sebastião da Pedreira parish merged with the Nossa Senhora de Fátima parish into a new parish named Avenidas Novas.

The Parish Church of São Sebastião da Pedreira is one of Lisbon's most remarkable churches, built in the 17th century and inaugurated in 1652. The building is a striking example of baroque religious architecture.

== Main sites ==
- Alfredo da Costa Hospital
- Malhoa Museum
- São Sebastião da Pedreira Church
