= Sotto Mayor Palace =

- Palácio Sotto Mayor (Portuguese)
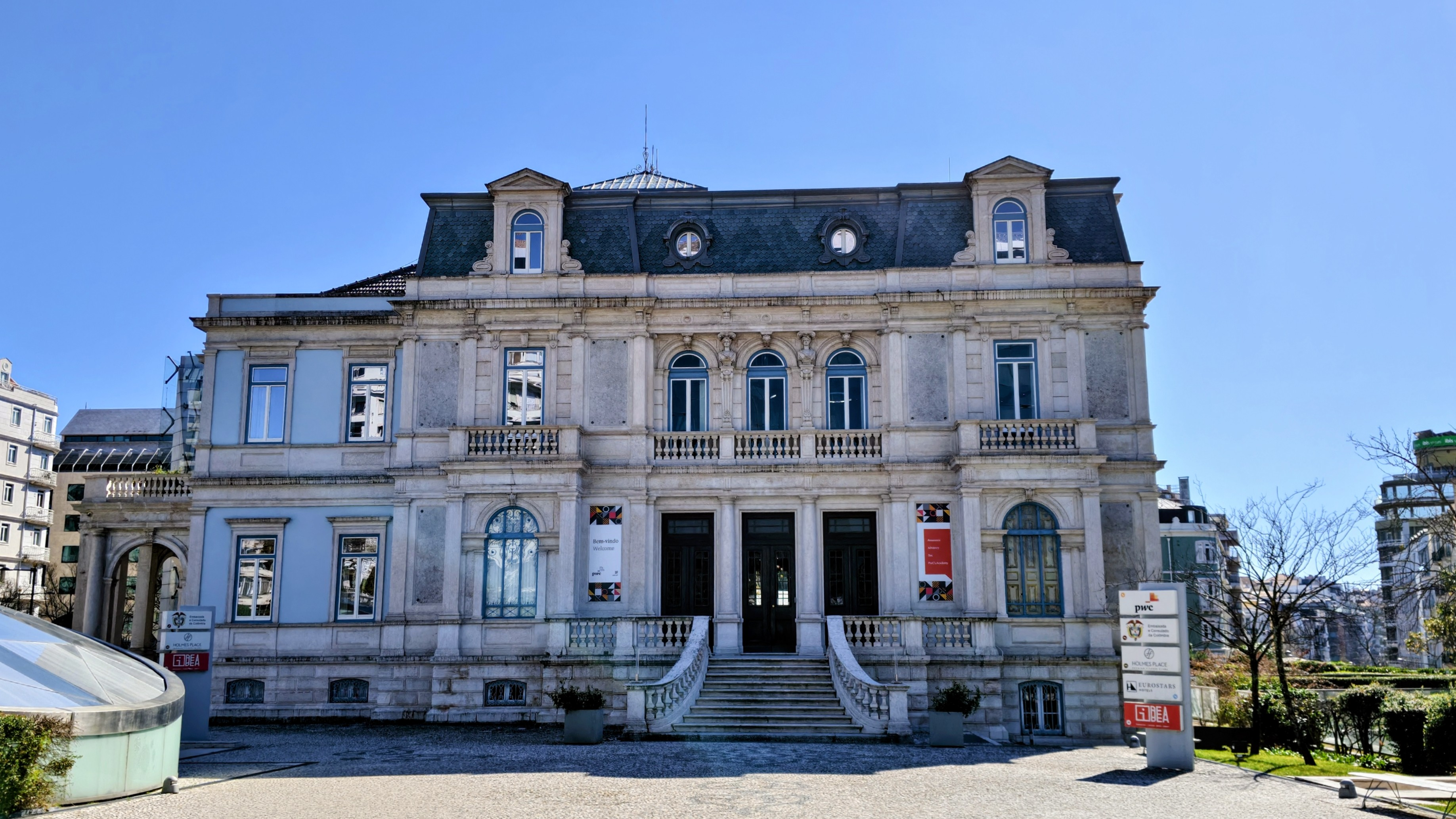
- Sotto Mayor Palace
- Interactive map of Sotto Mayor Palace
- 38°43′42.68″N 9°8′50.05″W
- Location: Lisbon, Portugal

Portuguese National Monument
- Official name: Palácio Sotto Mayor, Anexos e Logradouro
- Type: Property of Interest

The Sotto Mayor Palace (Portuguese: Palácio Sotto Mayor) is a Portuguese palace located in Lisbon.

== History ==
The Sotto Mayor Palace was built for Cândido Sotto Mayor, a Portuguese aristocrat, industrialist, founder of Banco Sotto Mayor and the richest man in Portugal at the time, to serve as his residence in the new avenues being built in late 19th century Lisbon.

In 1988, Sotto Mayor Palace was made a property of public interest by IPPAR.

After a fire in the palace, the Lisbon Municipal Chamber and IPPAR formalized and put into action a plan for re-qualification and remodeling of the palace. These plans called for an annex on the side of the palace, while only minor changes to the palace itself. These re-qualifications prepared the palace for its new function as a commercial center and as location of the Colombian embassy in Portugal.

== Sources ==
1. "Palácio Sotto Mayor, seus anexos e logradouro envolvente". Direção-Geral do Património Cultural (in European Portuguese). Archived from the original on 2019-12-13.
2. "RE: Palacio Sotto Mayor". Geneall (in Portuguese).
3. "Palácio Sotto Mayor em Lisboa será ocupado pela Virgin Active". Jornal de Negócios (in European Portuguese). 2010-08-23. Archived from the original on 2010-09-08.
