= Entre Campos Station =

Lisbon metro station

Entre Campos
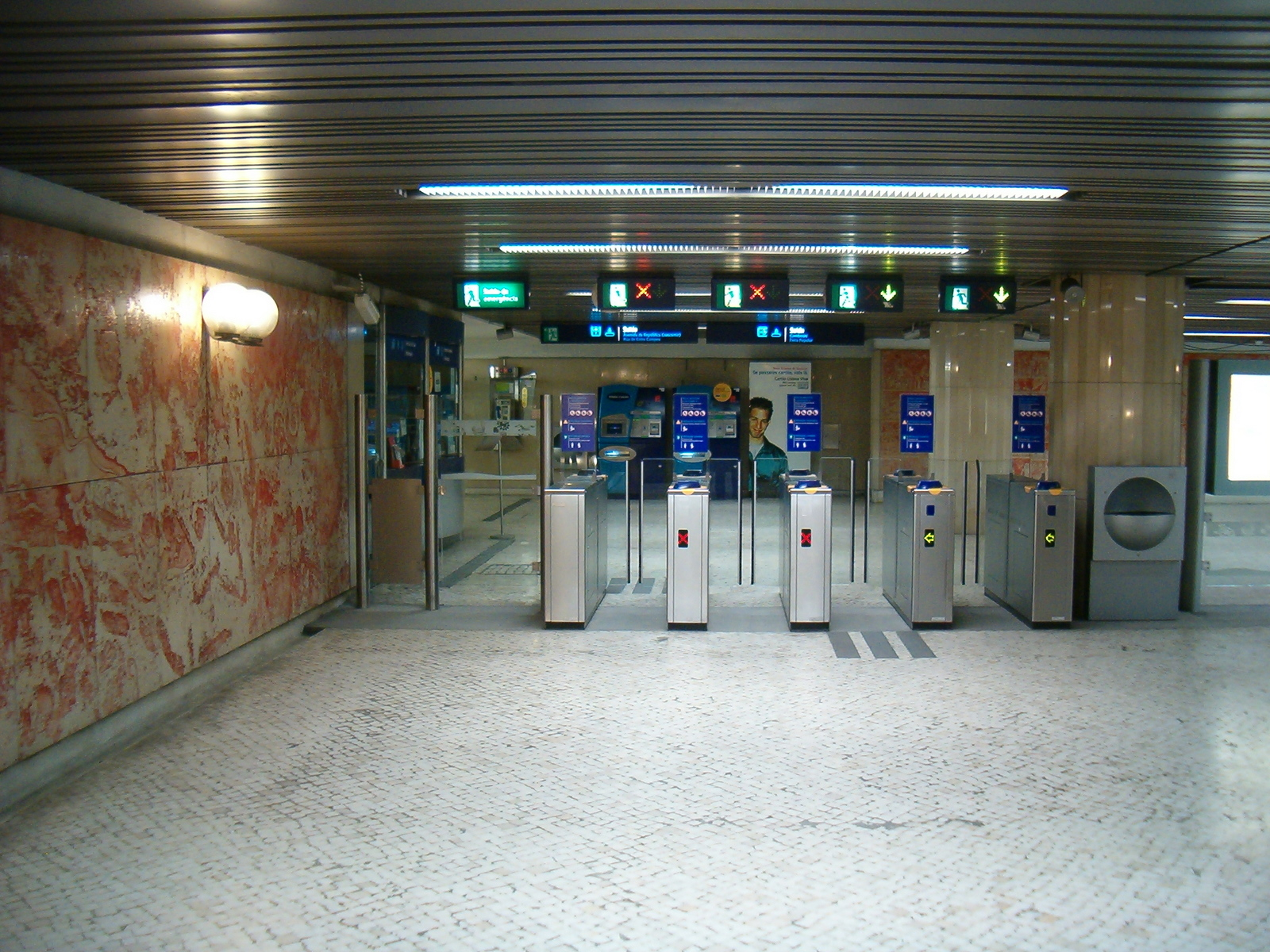

General information
- Location: Avenida da República, Lisbon; Portugal
- Coordinates: 38°44′53″N 9°8′55″W
- Owner: Government-owned corporation
- Operator: Metropolitano de Lisboa, EPE
- Line: Yellow Line
- Platforms: 2 side platforms
- Tracks: 2

Construction
- Structure type: Underground
- Accessible: Yes
- Architect: Falcão e Cunha

Other information
- Station code: EC
- Fare zone: L

History
- Opened: December 29, 1959 (66 years ago)
- Rebuilt: July 15, 1973 (53 years ago); December 11, 1993 (32 years ago)

Services
Preceding station	Lisbon Metro	Following station
Cidade Universitária towards Odivelas	Yellow Line	Campo Pequeno towards Rato
Route map
Location

Entre Campos station is part of the Yellow Line of the Lisbon Metro.

== History ==
It is one of the 11 stations that belong to the original Lisbon Metro network and opened on December 29, 1959. This station is located on Avenida da República. Its name reflects its location, between Campo Grande and Campo Pequeno.

The architectural design of the original station is by Falcão e Cunha. On July 15, 1973, the station was extended, based on the architectural design of Dinies Gomes. On December 11, 1993, the station was refurbished, based on the architectural design of Sanchez Jorge.

== Connections ==
=== Urban buses ===
==== Carris ====
- 207 Cais do Sodré ⇄ Fetais
- 727 Estação Roma-Areeiro ⇄ Restelo - Av. das Descobertas
- 736 Cais do Sodré ⇄ Odivelas (Bairro Dr. Lima Pimentel)
- 738 Quinta dos Barros ⇄ Alto de Santo Amaro
- 744 Marquês de Pombal ⇄ Moscavide (Quinta das Laranjeiras)
- 749 ISEL ⇄ Estação Entrecampos
- 754 Campo Pequeno ⇄ Alfragide
- 783 Amoreiras (Centro Comercial) ⇄ Portela - Rua Mouzinho de Albuquerque

==== Aerobus ====
- Linha 2 Aeroporto ⇄ Sete Rios

=== Rail ===
==== Comboios de Portugal ====
- Sintra ⇄ Lisboa - Oriente
- Sintra ⇄ Alverca
- Alcântara-Terra ⇄ Castanheira do Ribatejo
- Alcântara-Terra ⇄ Azambuja
- Lisboa - Santa Apolónia ⇄ Leiria (Regional)
- Lisboa - Santa Apolónia ⇄ Caldas da Rainha (Regional, InterRegional)
- Lisboa - Santa Apolónia ⇄ Torres Vedras (Regional)
- Lisboa - Oriente ⇄ Évora (InterCity)
- Lisboa - Oriente ⇄ Faro (InterCity)
- Porto - Campanhã ⇄ Faro (Alfa Pendular)

==== Fertagus ====
- Setúbal ⇄ Roma-Areeiro
- Coina ⇄ Roma-Areeiro

== See also ==
- List of Lisbon metro stations
