= Praça de Espanha, Lisbon =

Square in Lisbon, Portugal

Coordinates: 38°44′16″N 9°09′27″W

Praça de Espanha is a square in Lisbon, from which vehicles can proceed to the South bank of the river Tejo.

Near Praça de Espanha is situated the famous Fundação Calouste Gulbenkian, an important cultural center of the Portuguese capital, as well as Palácio de Palhavã, the residence of the ambassador of Spain.

The Square was fully reconstructed in 1998.

The Square also hosts a metro station Praça de Espanha.

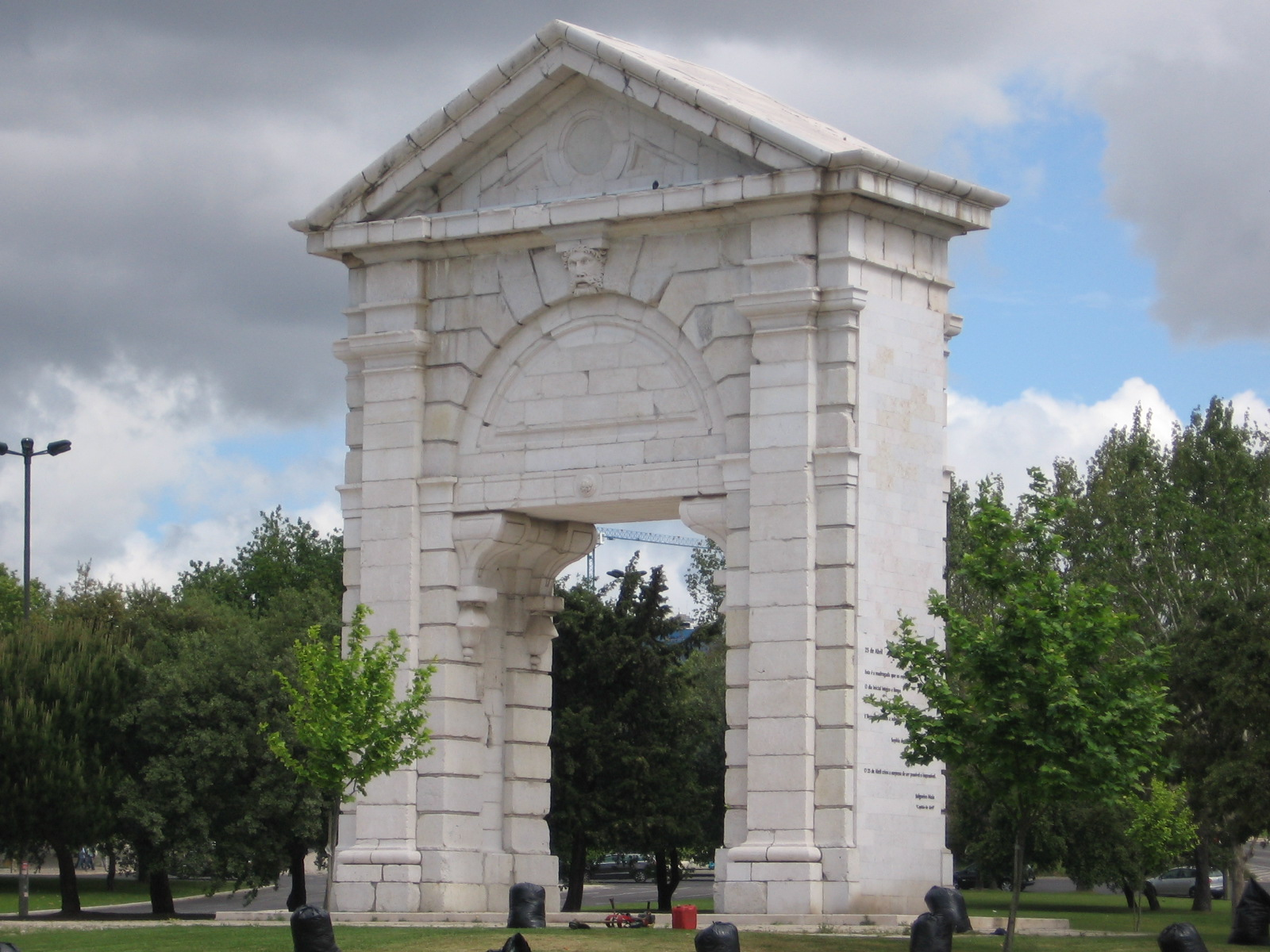
Arco de S. Bento
