= Palacio de Benacazón =

Palace in Toledo, Spain

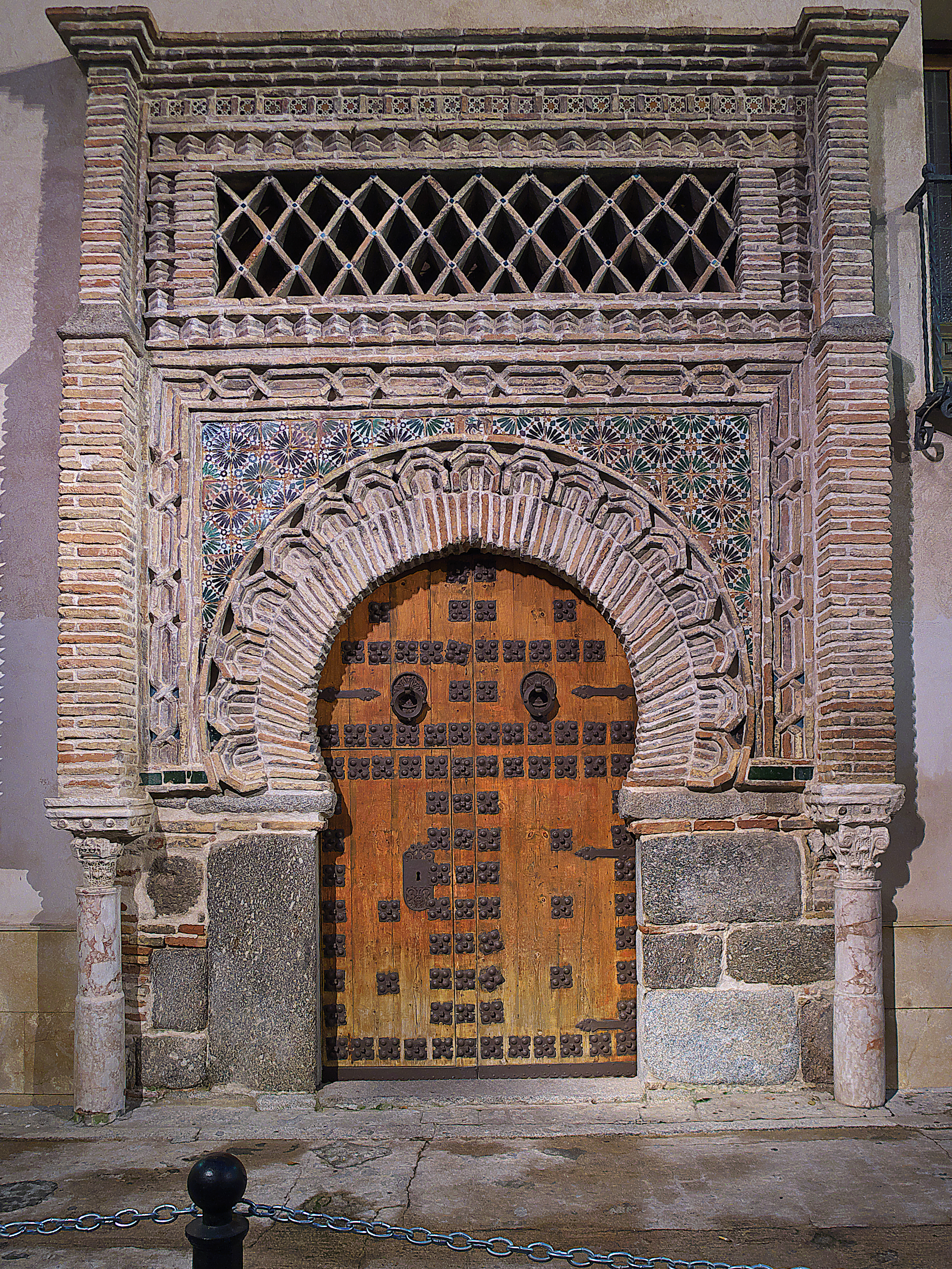
Portal

The Palacio de Benacazón is a palace located in the city of Toledo, in Castile-La Mancha, Spain.

This palace is one of the most representative examples of the typical houses of Toledo. Its courtyard is of Mudéjar style, together with its decoration, based on plasterwork and azulejos, are its main attractions. Over time it has undergone numerous restorations.

The palace that currently bears the name of Palacio de Benacazón in Toledo is, probably from the time of Peter of Castile the Cruel, was also the seat of the Holy Office (the Inquisition). Former property of Fernán Pérez de Pantoja, it was manor house of the Pantoja and the Gaytán families, being called from the 16th century like Palacio de los Pantoja. It is between 1920 and 1940. Anastasio Páramo Barranco, who was the only descendant, gave himself before he died the name of Anastasio Páramo y Pantoja Cepeda, as well as the titles of Count of Benacazón, Lord of Mocejón and Benacazón. In the sixties it was Medical Consultation Center.

It is currently the headquarters of the Caja Castilla-La Mancha Foundation, a cultural center where stage arts are performed.
