= Convento de los Carmelitas Descalzos, Toledo =

Convent in Castile-La Mancha, Spain

Coordinates: 39.8604°N 4.0249°W

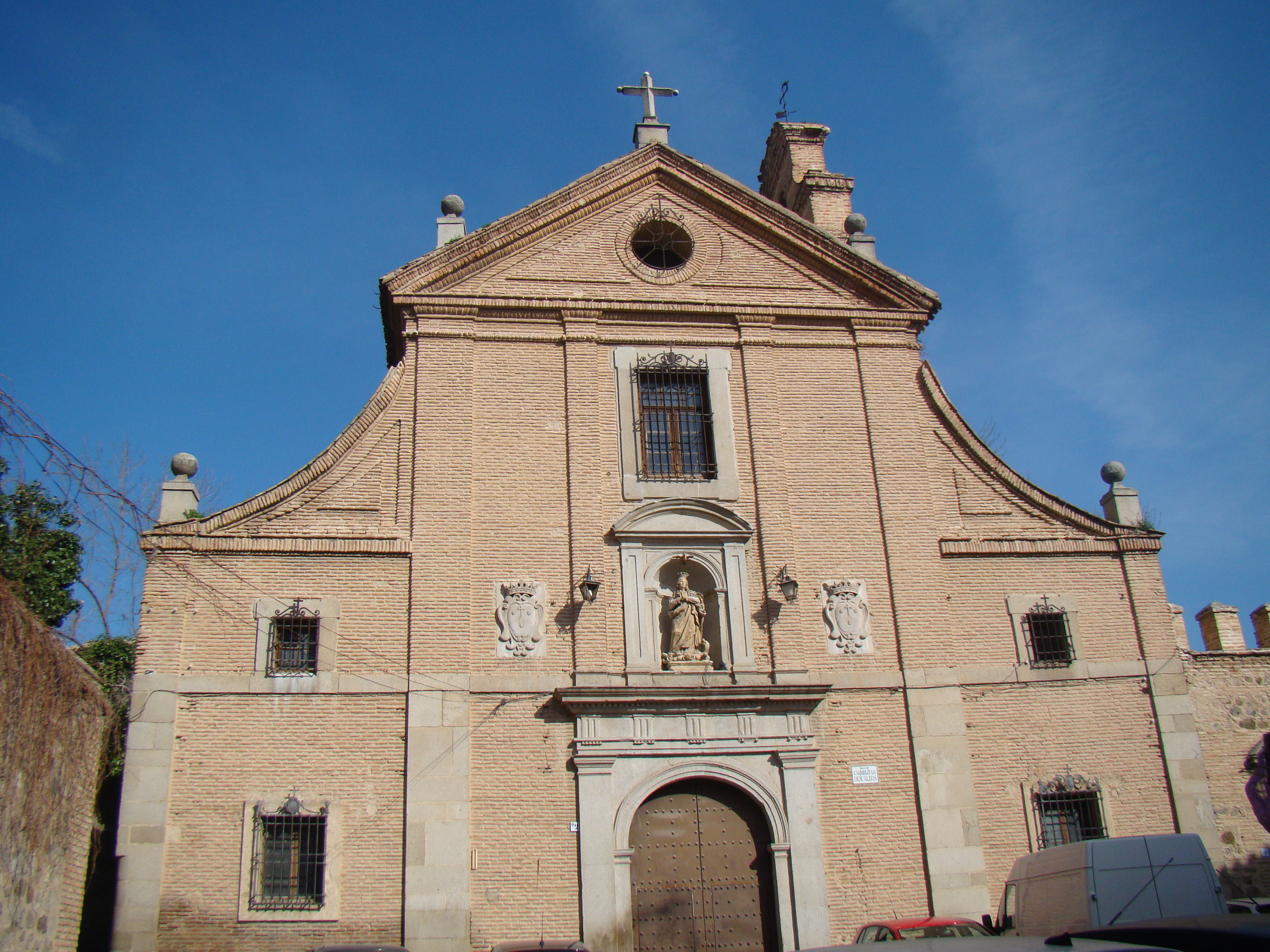
Facade

The Convento de los Carmelitas Descalzos is a Discalced Carmelite convent dating to 1643 located in the city of Toledo (Castile-La Mancha, Spain). Azulejos panels from the 18th century covers the central nave and the chapels. The altarpieces was introduced from other buildings.
